= List of educational institutions in Palai =

Colleges in Pala are affiliated to the Mahatma Gandhi University, Kottayam. Many institutions are run under the management of the Diocese of Pala. The following are the educational institutions in the locality:

== Colleges ==
- Civil Service Institute Pala
- St. Thomas College, Palai
- Alphonsa College, Pala
- Henry Baker College, Melukavu
- Deva Matha College, Kuravilangad
- Government Polytechnic College, Pala
- BVM Holy Cross College, Cherpunkal
- Co-operative Engineering College, Kidnangoor
- College of Engineering Poonjar
- St. Joseph's College of Engineering and Technology, Pala
- Mar Sleeva Nursing School, Cherpunkal
- St. Joseph's College of Hotel Management and Catering Technology, Pala
- Mar Augusthinose college, Ramapuram
- St. George College, Aruvithura
- Indian Institute of Information Technology, Valavoor

Proposed: Indian Institute of Hotel Management and Catering Technology, Mar Sleeba Medical College

== Schools ==
- St. Joseph G.H.S, Mutholy (Kerala Board)
- St. Josph's HS Kudakkachira (Kerala Board)
- St. Augustine's HSS, Ramapuram (Kerala Board)
- Chavara CMI International School, Ramapuram (ICSE & ISC)
- Government HSS, Pala (Kerala Board)
- St. Thomas HSS, Pala (Kerala Board)
- St. Mary's HSS, Pala (Kerala Board)
- St. Thomas HS, Marangattupilly (Kerala Board)
- St. Antonys's HSS, Mutholy (Kerala Board)
- Holy Cross HSS, Cherpunkal (Kerala Board)
- Alphonsa Residential School Bharanganam (ICSE)
- St. Vincent HSS, Pala (ICSE)
- Chavara CMI Public School and Junior College, Palai (CBSE)
- St. J.N. HSS, Kozhuvanal (Kerala Board)
- St. Sebastins Hsaa Kadanad (Kerala Board)
- St. Joseph's HS Manathoor, Pizhaku (Kerala Board)
- Labour India Gurukulam public school (CBSE)
- St. Antony's HSS, Plassanal (Kerala Board)
- St. Mary's HSS, Kidangoor
- NSS HSS Kdangoor
- St. Michael's H.S.S. Pravithanam
- S. V NSS HS Edanad
- S.K.V.U.P.S, Kurinji
- S.K.V. Govt.L.P.S, Kurinji
- St. Josephs UPS Kannadiyurumpu
- N.S.S. AIDED UPS, Kidangoor South
- Govt UP School Anthinad

Infant Jesus Public School Mangalaram (CBSE)

== Training institutes ==
- Brilliant Study Centre, Pala
- Goodwill Institute of Technology, Pala
- St. Thomas Teacher Training College, Pala
- St. Thomas Teacher Training Institute
- Cherian J Kappen Memorial Industrial Training Institute
- P value solution for data science and business analytics

== Coaching centres ==
- Brilliant Study Centre, established in 1984, provides coaching for Medical and Engineering Entrance Examination
- Goodwill Institute of Technology, pioneer skill development institution, located in the heart of Pala
- T.I.M.E. Institute Pala, classroom based medical and engineering coaching institute
- The Civil Service Institute, founded in January, 1998, sponsored by the Archdiocese of Changanacherry and the dioceses of Palai and Kanjirappally as a part of the Inter-diocesan Centre for Human Resources Developmenm
- Mohans Institute of Corporate Studies (MICS), provides Chartered Accountancy (CA) and Company Secretaryship (CS) courses; classes are taught by company secretaries and chartered accountants
- Lumen Study Centre: St. Thomas College Palai, provides a coaching centre for Medical and Engineering Entrance Examination run by St. Thomas College Management
- Talent Academy Pala, provides classes and preparation techniques for AIEEE, JEE-IIT Kerala state medical/engineering examinations
- Thoppans' Swimming Academy, owned and operated by Thoppil brothers
