= Kollappally =

- Town
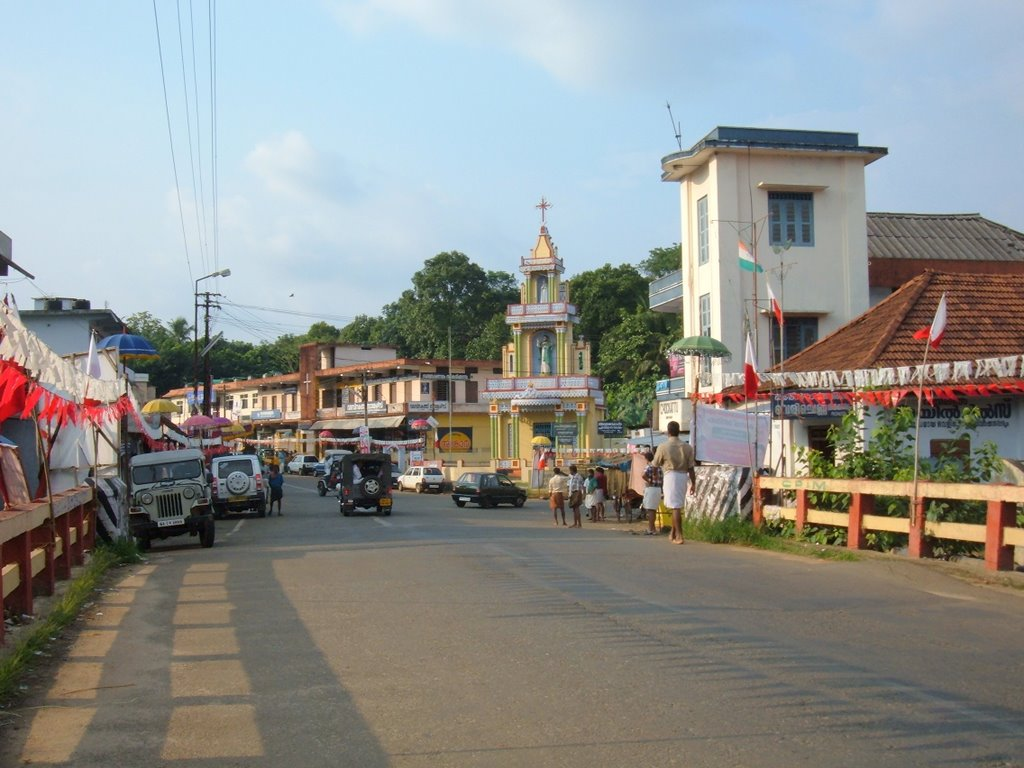

- Location in Kerala, India Kollappally (India)
- Coordinates: 9°45′33″N 76°41′59″E
- Country: India
- State: Kerala
- District: Kottayam

Government
  - Body: Grama Panchayat

Languages
  - Official: Malayalam
- Time zone: UTC+5:30 (IST)
- PIN: 686651
- Vehicle registration: KL- 35
- Nearest city: Pala
- Lok Sabha constituency: Kottayam
- Civic agency: Grama Panchayat
- Climate: cool

Kollappally is a developing town in Kottayam district near Pala, Kerala, India. It is located between two major cities of Kerala, Pala and Thodupuzha, on the Main Eastern Highway (state highway-8). It connects Kottayam to two towns in Idukki district - Pynavu, the headquarters of Idukki district, and Thodupuzha, the business centre of Idukki district. The next nearest village is Ullanadu. Kollappally is 180 km away from the state capital, Trivandrum. The Lalam river flows through the heart of the town.

== Transport ==
- The nearest Railway station is Ettumanoor, 23 KM and Kottayam which is around 35 KM.
- The nearest Airport is Cochin International Airport, about 65 km. Trivandrum International Airport is around 190 KM from Kollappally.
- The Main Eastern Highway (Punalur-Pala-Thodupuzha-Muvattupuzha Road (SH–08)) connects the town to other major towns.
- Kollappally is 7 Kilometres from Pala and 22 Kilometres from Thodupuzha.
- Pala- Kollappally - Neeloor - Muttom - Thodupuzha Road

== Schools ==
- St Sebastian's Higher Secondary School Kadanad
- Government UP school Anthinad
- St Thomas college Pala
- Alphonsa College Pala
- St Thomas HSS Pala
- Govt HSS Pala
- St. Joseph’s College of Engineering and Technology
- Chavara CMI Public School & Junior College
- St. Vincent English Medium Higher Secondary School Pala
- St. Joseph's English Medium High School, Neeloor
- Bappuji Public School, Elivaly
- Ambika Vidyabhavan Aimcompu
- St. Michael's High School, Pravithanam
- Nirmala Public school, Pizhaku
- Sanjos Public School, Choondacherry
- St. John's High School Kurumannu

== Religious places ==
- St Joseph's Church Anthinad
- St. Augustine's Church - Kadanad
- Sree Mahadeva Temple Anthinad
- Parekkavu devi temple Aimcomp
- Sree Dharma Sastha Temple Kadanad
- SNDP Temple Kollappally
- JW (Jesus Workers) Community Kollappally
