= Muttom, Thodupuzha =

Muttom
- Gram Panchayat
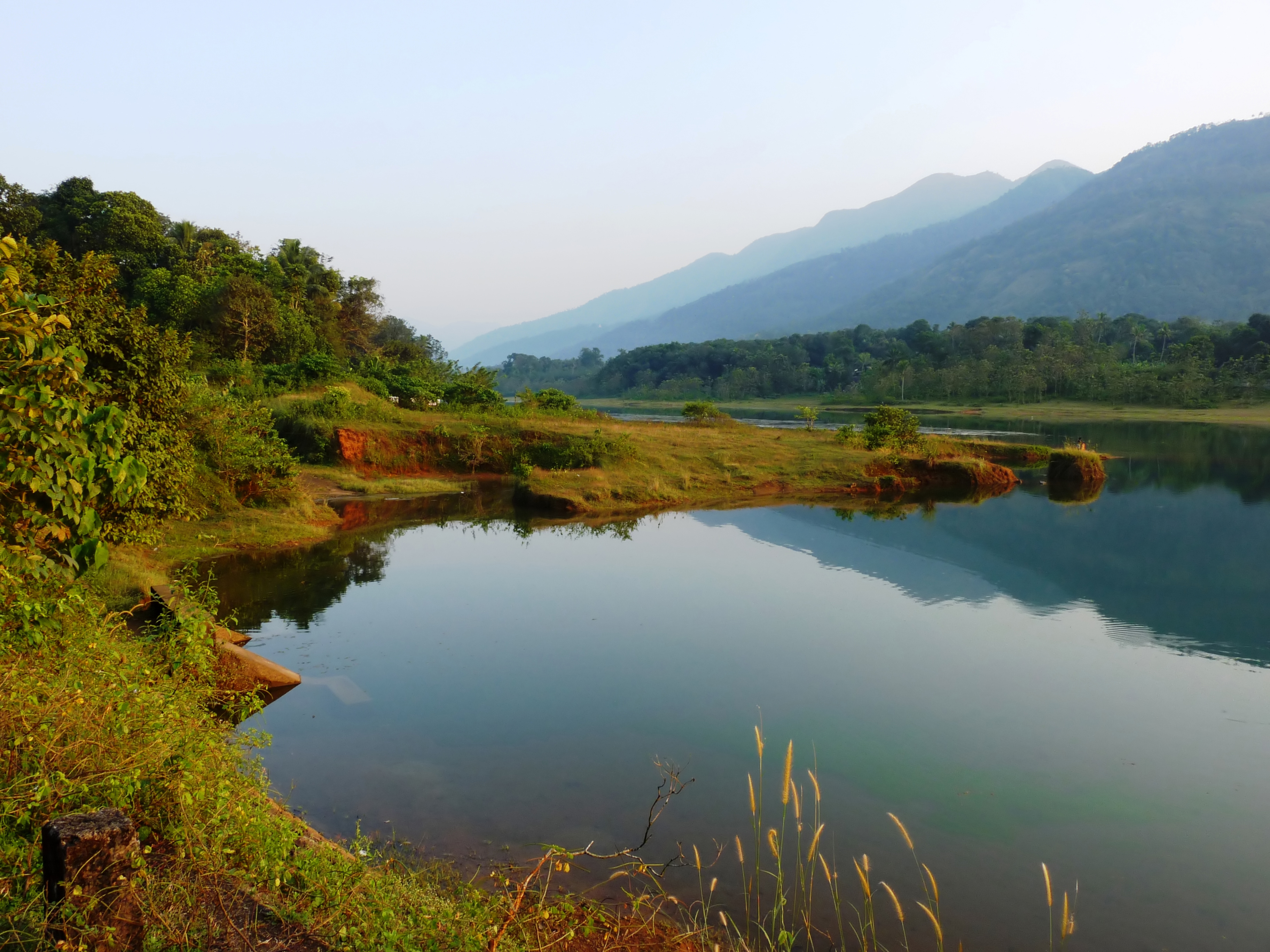
- View of Malankara Dam reservoir from Kudayathoor
- Interactive map of Muttom
- Coordinates: 9.8377755°N 76.7126147°E
- Country: India
- State: Kerala
- District: Idukki

Government
  - Type: Panchayati Raj
  - Body: Panchayat Samithi
- Elevation: 22 m (72 ft)

Population (2001)
  - Total: 10,228

Languages
  - Official: Malayalam, English, Hindi
- Time zone: UTC+5:30 (IST)
- PIN: 685587
- Telephone code: +914862
- Vehicle registration: KL-38

Muttom is a rural area in Idukki district in the Indian state of Kerala. This place is 8.5 km away from Thodupuzha and 66 km away from Kochi. Geographically, this place is part of Midland or Idanad region of Kerala.

== Places with similar name ==
There are ten other places named as "Muttom" in various parts of Kerala and Tamil Nadu :

- Thodupuzha - Muttom
- Kanyakumari-Muttom,
- Haripad-Muttom,
- Cherthala-Muttom,
- Aluva-Muttom,
- Kannur-Muttam, payangadi
- Thodupuzha-Ezhumuttom
- Kasaragod- Muttam (Shiriya Post, Kumbala)
- Coimbatore-Muttam lies in the Kongu region, near the foothills of the famous Vellingiri hills and in the banks of the Kanchi Maanadhi river (Noyyal).
- Cuddalore-Muttam is a village in Kattumannarkoil Taluk, Cuddalore District, Tamil Nadu State.
- Nagapattinam-Muttam is one of the Village in Nagapattinam District in Tamil Nadu State.

== Geography ==
Adjacent areas/panchayaths of Muttom are at east Kudayathoor, at west Karimkunnam (village), at south Kadanad and Melukavu and at north Alacode and Edavetty.

Thodupuzha river is flowing through this village. Another important water body is Parappan thodu.

== Demographics ==
As of 2001 India census, the total population is 10,228. Muttom has an average literacy rate of 96%: male and female literacy is 96%. Population density is 402.

== Economy and infrastructure ==
=== Agriculture ===
Muttom's economy is driven by agriculture. Also there are small scale industries. Major part of the agriculture land is used for natural rubber cultivation. Other crops such as pineapple, coconut, rice, pepper, cocoa, tapioca, banana, ginger, turmeric, etc. are also being cultivated. Krishi Bhavan is the state government agency working to coordinate the agriculture activities.

A related animal husbandry is also existing here. Cattle, goat and chicken are the main livestock raising here. Veterinary hospital and Milma ksheera sahakarana sangham are functioning to provide required guidance to this sector.

=== Industries ===
There are no major or medium industries functioning in this village. A number of small scale industries are working here such as Kakkombu RPS which is based on rubber production and promotion, also provides guidance to farmers. A spices park is also started to function at Thudanganad.

=== Communication ===
Almost every house has a landline phone connection. A BSNL telephone exchange is functioning in this village. In recent years mobile phone usage is dramatically increased in this area. Almost all the major mobile service providers in Kerala have presence in this village. There are two India post offices are also functioning here.

=== Transportation ===
People of this area depend on road network for transportation. Muttom has an excellent network of roads which connects it to the nearby towns and cities. State Highway 33 (Kerala) - Thodupuzha- Puliyanmala road and State Highway 44 (Kerala) - Sabarimala – Neriamangalam Road are passing through this village. There are several private and public bus services through Muttom.

==== Railway ====
There are no railway network passing through this village. Nearby railway stations are Ernakulam South 67 km, Ernakulam North 69 km, Aluva 62 km and Kottayam 51 km.

==== Airport ====
Cochin International Airport is the nearest airport which 60 km away from Muttom

== Government ==
=== Local government ===
This gram panchayat was established in 1953. A gram panchayat Bharanasamithi is functioning as the local government body. Its members are elected by people of each electoral ward. Electoral college is based on the universal suffrage. Panchayat has 13 electoral wards at present. This area also belongs to Thodupuzha block panchayat and Idukki zilla panchayat. This three tier system is functioning under Panchayati raj system. Election to these local governing bodies is conducted in every five years. An administrative wing is functioning with panchayat Bharanasamithi to project execution and tax collection.

Muttom is part of Thodupuzha assembly constituency of Kerala Legislature. This place belongs to Idukki (Lok Sabha constituency)

=== Law and order ===
- Law enforcement agency is Kerala Police. This place belongs to the jurisdiction of Muttom Sub Inspector office.
- Idukki District Court is headquartered in this village.
- Idukki district prison is also working in this village.
- Vigilance and Anti Corruption Bureau, Idukki unit.

== Healthcare ==
People mainly depend on medical science and ayurveda for healthcare needs. A community health centre and a number of private hospitals are functioning here. No major healthcare institutions are functioning here. People need to travel to Thodupuzha for advanced healthcare facilities.

- CHC Muttom (Govt.)
- District Homeo Hospital, near to Idukki district court (Govt.)
- Govt. Ayurveda Dispensary
- Karuna Hospital
- MM Hospital
- Chirackal Athreya Ayurveda hospital

== Education institutions ==
- University College of Engineering, Thodupuzha
- Government Polytechnic College, Muttom
- College of Applied Science, Muttom
- Technical Higher Secondary School, Muttom
- Govt. Higher Secondary School, Muttom. This is one of the early educational institution in this village. Previously it was known as Sree Lakshmivilasam Sanskrita Patashala.
- St. Thomas High School, Thudanganad
- St.Thomas L P School Thudanganad
- Shanthal Jyothi Public School, Muttom
- Panchayat LP School, Illichari
- St. Mary's LP School Kakkombu
- CSI ITC/ITI Challavayal

== Banks ==
- State Bank of India, (Agriculture) Muttom - Thudanganad.
- Federal Bank, Muttom.
- Thodupuzha Urban Bank, Muttom.
- The Muttom Service Co-Operative Bank, Muttom
- The Idukki District Co-Operative Bank, Muttom
- The Thudanganadu Service Co-operative Bank, Thudanganadu
- Kerala Gramin Bank
- South Indian Bank

== Places of interest ==
- Malankara Dam is a gravity dam constructed across Thodupuzha river for irrigation purpose. The tail water from Moolamattom Power house is stored here.
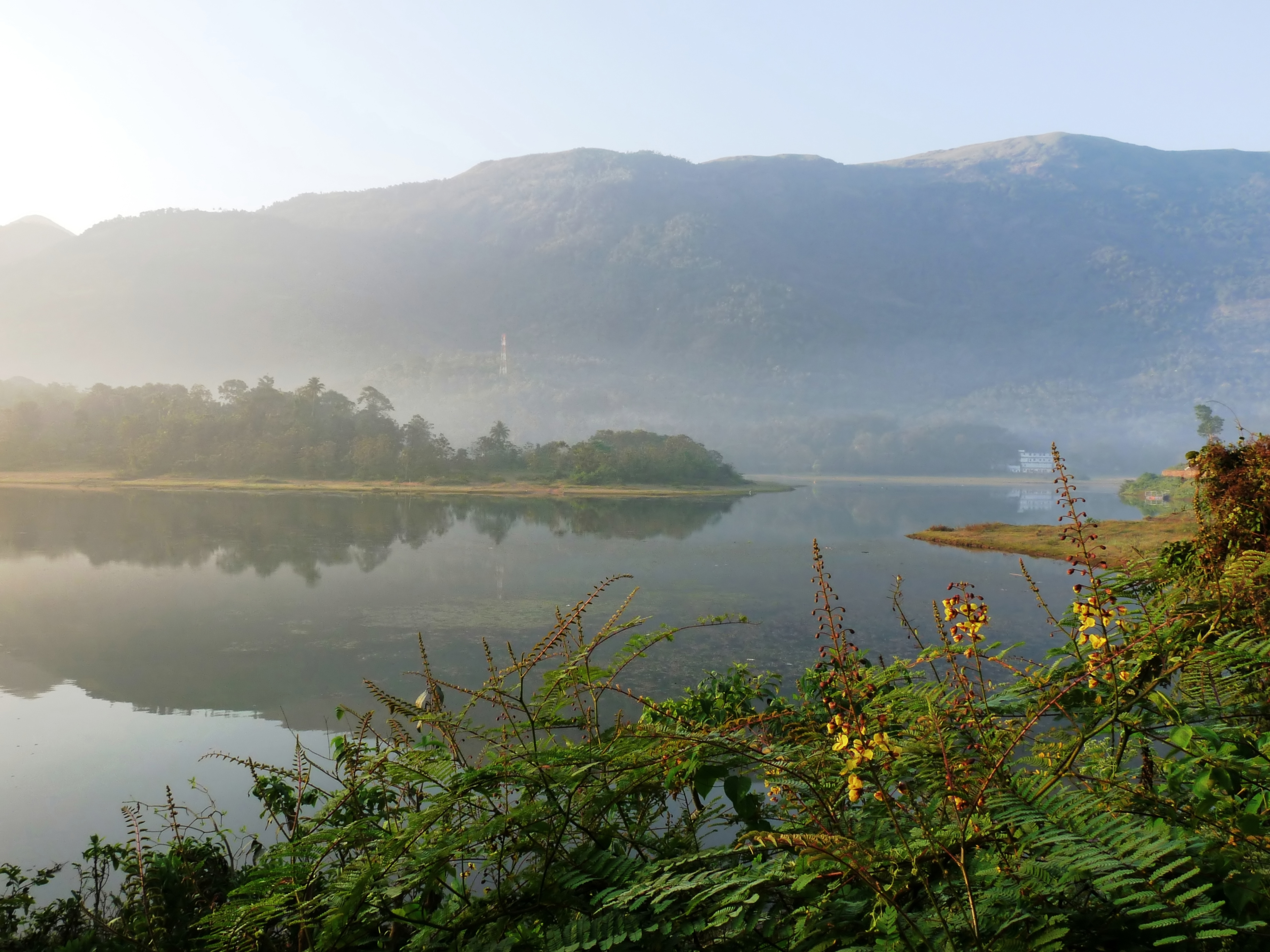
  Morning view of Malankara Dam reservoir from Kudayathoor.

- Malankara Dam Children's Park is part of Malankara tourism project. A walk way and amenity center also started to function here.
- Ilaveezha Poonchira is situated in Kudayathoor Mountain or Vindyan ranges with a green meadows in and around. There is cave in the north east side the hill and the name itself explain that there is no tree in this area. One can reach Ilaveezhapoonchira by road from Muttom via Kanjar or Melukavu around 30 minutes drive.
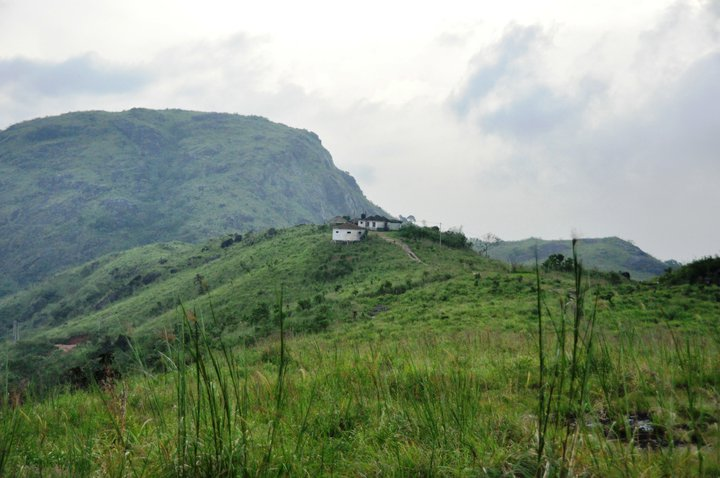
  Ilaveezhapoonchira near Melukavu.
- District Rifle Association Idukki (DRAI) Shooting Range is situated in Muttom nearby Malankara dam.
- Nadukani pavilion is situated near Moolamattom around 22 km from Muttom en route to Idukki.
- Aruvikuth Waterfalls This waterfall is situated near to Hilly Aqua plant on Thodupuzha-Muttom road.
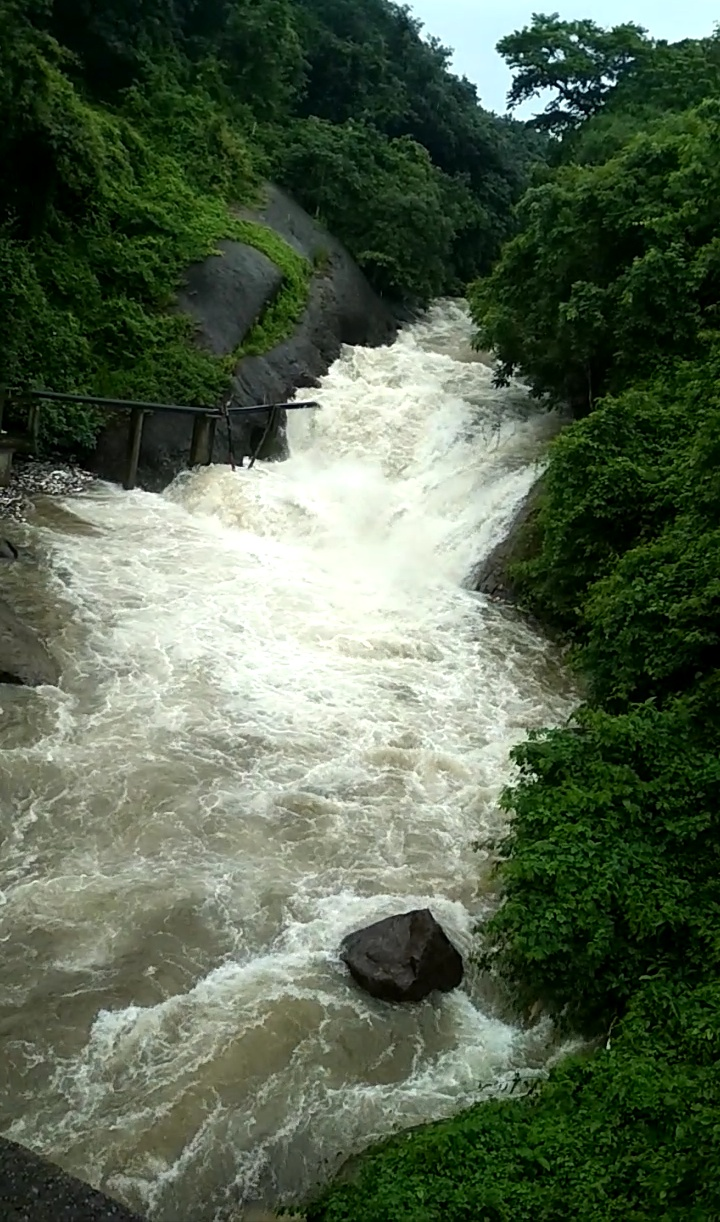
  Aruvikuth Waterfalls near Muttom Thodupuzha.
- Poothakkuzhi Waterfalls This water fall is near to Muttom-Moolamattom road.
- Pachilamkunnu View Point
- Kannadippara View Point

== Places of worship ==
=== Temples ===
- Thayyakavu Bhagvati Temple
- Sree Krishnaswamy Temple, School Junction

=== Churches ===
- St. Mary's Knanaya Catholic Church, Oorakkunnu
- St. Mary's Orthodox Syrian Church (Suriyani Palli), Court Junction
- The Pentecostal Mission
- St. Sebastian Church Sibigiri
- St. Joseph Church Jose Mount
- St. Mathias C.S.I. Church Ellumpuram
- St. Thomas Forane Church Thudanganad
- St. Mary's Church Kakombu
- St. Luke's C.S.I. Church Kuzhiynal
- Born again People's Church (BPC) Pallikavala
- Logos Church

=== Mosques ===
- Muhayiddin Jamaath, Muttom
- Sabaha Masjid, Court Junction
- Malankara Makham Juma Masjid, Perumattom, Muttom

=== Shrine ===
- The Shrine of Sayyed Muhammed Pookunji Seetikoya Tangal is located in the right bank of Todupuza river at Perumattom and the annual Urz will be celebrate in the month of April.
