= Melukavu =

MELUKAVU (Melukavumattom) Melukavu
- village
- Location in Kerala, India MELUKAVU (Melukavumattom) (India)
- Coordinates: 9°47′0″N 76°45′30″E
- Country: India
- State: Kerala
- District: Kottayam

Population (2011)
  - Total: 9,385

Languages
  - Official: Malayalam, English
- Time zone: UTC+5:30 (IST)
- PIN: 686652
- Telephone code: 0482
- Vehicle registration: KL-35
- Nearest city: Thodupuzha, Erattupetta
- Lok Sabha constituency: Kottayam
- Vidhan Sabha constituency: Palai
- Website: lsgkerala.in/melukavupanchayat

Melukavu (Melukavumattom) is a village in the eastern part of Meenachil Taluk in Kottayam district of Kerala state, India.

== Tourism ==
The place is a major tourist attraction for nature lovers with beautiful hills, streams and rubber plantations that form a green blanket over the place. The famous tourist spot is Ilaveezha Poonchira. Illickal Kallu is another major tourist attraction in Kottayam district. Even though it is in Moonnilavu panchayat, it is near to Melukavu.

== Film shooting venue ==
The plot of the famous Malayalam film Katha Parayumpol (Year-2007, Starring:Mammootty, Sreenivasan) was set in kurisinkal – the backdrop of Melukavu village. The movie Parudeesa was shot in Erumapra and the movie Swapnam Kondu Thulabharam was set in the scenic beauty of the Melukavu.

== Geography ==
Melukavu is in the eastern part of Kottayam district and borders with Idukki district on its North-East and North. It shares its borders with Kudayathoor Panchayat in North-East and Muttom Panchayat in North (both are in Idukki district). Bharananganam and Kadanadu Panchayats are in West and Moonnilavu Panchayat is in East. The Southern side borders with Thalappalam Panchayat.

Melukavu is at the fringe of the Western Ghats. The place is situated in an ecologically fragile hill terrain which is prone to landslides during monsoon. Melukavu was the epicentre of the earthquake that recorded 5 in Richter scale on 12 December 2000 at 06:53 AM local time resulting in some damage to properties in Kottayam and Idukki districts. There are many streams and brooks originating from Melukavu hills and flow southwards through Edamaruku to join Meenachil River at Erattupetta.

== Transportation ==
Melukavu is well connected by roads to nearby towns Erattupetta(12 km), Palai(16 km), Thodupuzha(18 km).The state highway SH-44 connecting Pampa(Sabarimala) to Neriyamangalam(Thodupuzha) passes through Melukavu.

There are no railway line passing through Melukavu. The nearest major railway station is in Kottayam (50 km).

The nearest airport is Cochin International Airport at a distance of 70 kilometres.

== Demographics ==
As of 2011 India census, Melukavu had a population of 9385 with 4623 males and 4762 females.

== Educational institutions ==
- Henry Baker College- Government Aided College affiliated to Mahatma Gandhi University, Kottayam
- M.D.C.M.S High School
- CMS Higher Secondary School
- St.Paul’s LPS Vakakkadu
- CMS LPS Ellumpuram
- St.Antony’s UPS Edamaruku
- St.Pius X UPS, Piusmount, Konippadu
- St.Thomas UPS Melukavumattom
- Melukavu Panchayat LPS, Konippadu

== Places of worship ==
- ST.JAMES AND ST.PHILIPOSE CSI CHURCH KOLANI (peerakkadu,പീരക്കാട്)
- Sree Dharma Sastha Temple, Kalluvettam
- Ayyappa temple Kulathikandam
- C S I Christ Cathedral Church, Melukavu
- St.Luke's C S I Church, Caylei land
- St.Peter's C S I Church, Erumapra
- St.Thomas Catholic Church, Melukavumattom
- St.Andrew's C S I Church, Bakerdale, Chalamattom
- St.Pius X Catholic Church, Piusmount
- St.Antony's Catholic Church Edamaruku
- St.Mathiyas C S I Church Ellumpuram
- St.Paul's C S I Church Erumapramattom
- Church of God in India (Full Gospel)Church, Chalamattom, Near Village Office.
- Church of God (Full Gospel) in India, Kolani
- IPC Peniel Church, Erumapra (anchumala)
- IPC Church, Kanjiramkavala
- New India Church Melukavuu
- St.John's C S I Church chemmala

== See also ==
- Neeloor
- Muttom, Thodupuzha
- Kollappally
