= Mattathippara =

Village in India

Mattathipara is a village, part of Kadanad grama panchayathu in Palai Assembly constituency, Kottayam district and Karimkunnam grama panchayathu in Thodupuzha Assembly constituency, Idukki district, Kerala, India.

The flourishing of Mattathippara began in the 1970s with the entry of rubber plants. Agriculturists who cultivate rubber, pepper, coffee, banana, grampoo, coconut and other edible crops

Perumkunnu hills also located in Mattathipara.Starting point of pampanal waterfalls is in perumkunnu hills.

== Institutions ==
- Holy Cross Church, Gagultha
- Sree Dharmasastha Devi Temple (2 km from town) Neeloor Ambala bhagam
- Holy Cross U.P School
- JaiHind Public Library
- Govt.Ayurvedic Hospital
- Kadanad Service Co-Operative Bank
- Mattathipara Post Office (Pin-686651)
- Veterinary Dispensary
- Anganwadi
- Primary Health Center
- Orphanage ( Kunjachan Santhome Village)

== Transportation ==
Mattathippara is connected by roads to the nearby towns Neeloor and Karimkunnam. There is no railway line passing through Mattathippara. The nearest major railway station is in Kottayam (48 km). The nearest airport is Cochin International Airport at a distance of 75 kilometres.

A very interesting fact of Mattathippara is that there is a bus owned by villagers named Jenakiyan. It is the result of a group effort under the guidance of Fr. Thomas Paruthippara in 2008. The drivers and conductors of Janakeeyan are the villagers themselves.

=== Main road routes to reach Mattathippara ===
- Palai - Kollappally - Kurumannu -Neeloor -> Mattathippara
- Pala-Kollappally-Kadanad-Moonnuthekku-Ambalabhagam-> Mattathipara
- Pala-Kollappally-Kadanad-Ambalabhagam->Mattathipara
- Thodupuzha - Karimkunnam -> Mattathippara
- Palai - Kollappally- Karimkunnam -> Mattathippara
- Palai/Thodupuzha- Manathoor -> Mattathippara
- Muttom - Neeloor- Mattathippra

== Politics ==
Mattathipara is part of the Kottayam and part of Idukki Lok Sabha constituency and Palai Assembly Constituency (Mattathipara was one of the parts of Poonjar Assembly Constituency until 2011) and Thodupuzha Assembly Constituency. Kerala Congress (M) member Shri. Jose K. Mani is the present MP from Kottayam and Indian National Congress member Shri. Dean Kuriakose is the present MP from Idukki. Shri. Mani C. Kappan is the MLA of Palai Assembly Constituency and Shri. P.J Joseph is the MLA of Thodupuzha Assembly Constituency.

The main political parties are:

- Indian National Congress
- Kerala Congress (M)
- Kerala Congress (Joseph)
- BJP
- Aam Admi Party
- CPI(M)

== Closest cities, towns and villages ==
- Perumkunnumala is a beautiful place to visit, from which three districts can be seen. People from many places visit Mattathippara to enjoy the beauty. Prumkunnumala is at a higher altitude. One of the cross of Holy Cross Sunday School, Gagultha is also situated there. On every Good Friday a practice of 'KURISHINTE VAZHI' is conducted from the Holy Cross church to Perumkunnumala.
- Palai (23 km)
- Thodupuzha (13 km)
- Neeloor (4 km)
- Karimkunnam (6 km)
- Manathoor (3 km)
