= Pampanal Waterfalls =

Waterfalls in Kerala, India

Coordinates: 9.824°N 76.693°E

Pambanal Waterfalls
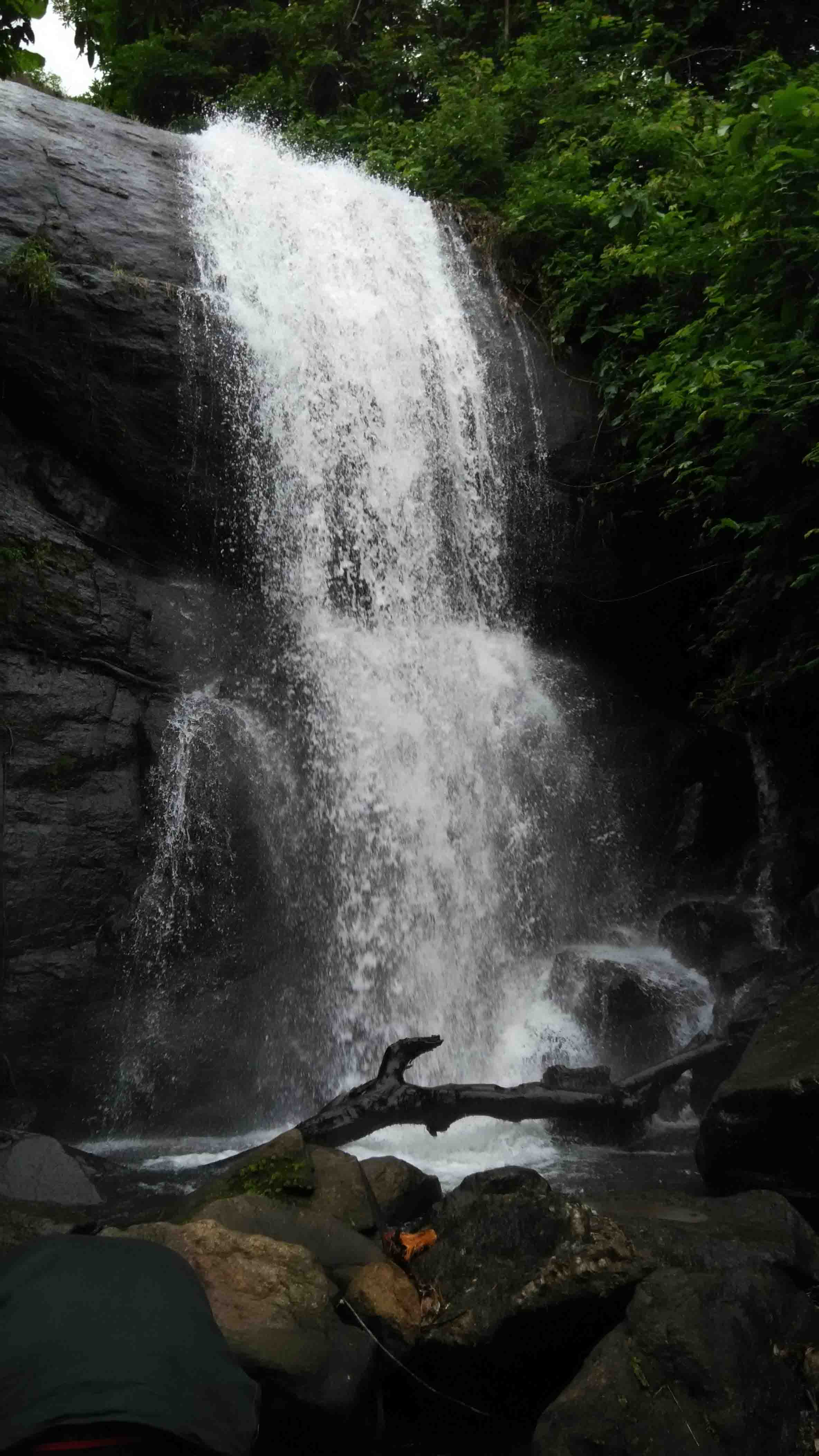
- Interactive map of Pambanal Waterfalls
- Location: Manathoor, Kottayam district, Kerala, India
- Total height: 50 m (160 ft)

Pampanal Waterfalls is located in Kottayam district in Kerala, India. It is located near Manathoor on the Pala-Thodupuzha bypass route, approximately 42 km (26 mi) from Kottayam town and 15 km (9.3 mi) from Thodupuzha. The waterfall has three viewpoints and rushes over the rocks for a long distance, and falls 50 m (160 ft) below.
