= Muttam =

Muttam or Muttom (മുട്ടം) may refer to:

== Places in India ==
- Muttom, Ernakulam, a district in Kerala and location of Muttom metro station
- Muttam, Kannur, a district in Kerala
- Muttom, Kanyakumari, a village in Tamil Nadu
- Muttom, Thodupuzha, a district in Idukki, Kerala
- Muttam, Cherthala, a church's name in Alappuzha district in kerala

== See also ==
- Muttampalam, a village in Kottayam district, Kerala
