= Neeloor =

- Village
- Location within Kerala Location within India
- Country: India
- State: Kerala
- District: Kottayam

Languages
  - Official: Malayalam, English
- Time zone: UTC+5:30 (IST)
- PIN: 686651
- Telephone Code: 04822
- Nearest town: Palai
- Lok Sabha Constituency: Kottayam

Neeloor is an agriculture-oriented rural village in the Taluk of Meenachil, Kottayam district, Kerala. The village is situated on the hill sides of Noorumala, Ellumpuram and Perumkunnu which are hills on the borders of Kottayam district and the neighboring Idukki district. Earlier the place was known as "Kallidapootha".

== History ==
Being a rural village, the entire region is covered by different sorts of farming. The historical backdrop of Neeloor is blurred in the pages of history. At the same time 'Sree Dharma Shasta Temple', Ambalabhagam, 2 km away from Neeloor suggests that the place has hundreds of years old legacy.

The new history begins with the beginning of the 20th century, when people from other areas came to Neeloor and settled here. In 1924 a chapel was established in the name of Saint Joseph and soon a primary school was started here. Later a parish was established here in the name of St. Francis Xavier in 1925. The parish now comes under the catholic diocese of Palai, Kerala. This parish now constitutes over 550 families and 3015 parishners.

In 1959 the primary school was upgraded to Upper Primary School and in 1961 a high school was started. The high school was among the first recognised un-aided schools in Kerala and today it is well known as St. Joseph's English Medium High School and has a long history of 100% pass in SSLC Examinations. Currently a CBSE school is also functioning along with it.

== Economy ==
Neeloor's economy is mainly dependent on agriculture. The major cultivation is natural rubber. Different crops like coconut, pepper, coco, tapioca, banana, ginger, turmeric, etc. are also cultivated here. Cattle, goat and chicken are commonly domesticated here. A unit of Milma milk producers' society is working here to support the milk production in the region.

== Politics ==
Neeloor is part of the Kottayam Lok Sabha constituency and Pala Assembly Constituency (Neeloor was part of Poonjar Assembly Constituency till 2011). Main political parties in Neeloor include Indian National Congress, Kerala Congress, CPIM and BJP.

== Transport ==
People of this area mostly depend on public transport through road. The nearest railway station is Kottayam (43 km). Palai and Thodupuzha are the nearest towns and one can reach Neeloor easily by bus from these towns. The nearest airport is at Kochi (67 km) (Cochin International Airport).

== Timeline ==
- AD 1650 - Neeloor Temple established
- 1925 - Foundation of St.Xaviour's Parish Church
- 1927 - Establishment of St.Joseph Chappel at Neeloor
- 1934 - St.Joseph L.P School established
- 1934 - Construction of St. Benedict Mount Shrine at Ellumpuram
- 1955 - Neeloor Post Office functioned
- 1960 - L.P School upgraded to U.P School and inauguration of Neeloor Service Co-Operative Bank.
- 1962 - Established NSS office at Amabalabhagam
- 1961 - St.Joseph EMHS established
- 1963 - Savio Home-Boy's Hostel founded and Palai-Thodupuzha Bus service started
- 1964 - St.Joseph statue created at Neeloor
- 1966 - Pala to Kattappana Bus Service through Neeloor
- 1972 - Electricity came to Neeloor
- 1984 - Vincent De Paul Society started
- 1987 - Renovation of Parish Cemetery
- 1997 - SNDP Gurumandhiram founded
- 1998 - Inauguration of a 20 shutter building at Neeloor
- 2005 - St. Joseph's Public School started
- 2008 - Akshaya Centre started

== Institutions in the village ==
- St.Joseph English Medium High School, Neeloor
- Neeloor Service Co-Operative Bank
- Neeloor Post Office (Pin-686651)
- St. Joseph's UP School Neeloor
- NSS Karayogam Office
- SNDP Gurumandiram
- Savio Home-Boy's Hostel, Neeloor
- Gorethi Bhavan-Girl's Hostel
- Sacred Heart Convent, Neeloor
- SH Nursery School, Neeloor
- Akshaya e-centre
- Nabard Information Center
- Milma ksheera sahakarana sangham
- St.Joseph Public School Neeloor
- Farmer's Club Neeloor
- Rubber Producers Society

== Religious Institutions ==
- St. Xavier's Church, Neeloor
- St. Joseph Chappel, Neeloor
- Sree Dharma Shasta Temple, Ambalabhagam, Neeloor
- St. Benedict Mount Shrine, Ellumpuram

== Nearest towns and villages ==
- Palai [17 km]
- Thodupuzha [18 km]
- Kollappally [9 km]
- Muttom [9 km]
- Mattathippara [5 km]
- Karimkunnam [11 km]
- Erattupetta [18 km]
- Bharananganam [18 km]
