= Choondacherry =

Village in Kottayam district, Kerala, India

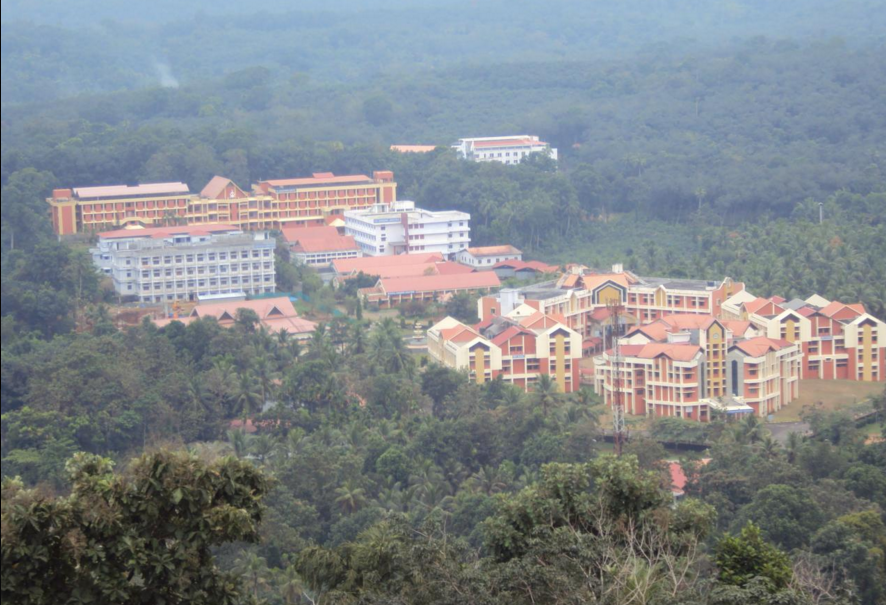
St. Joseph's College of Engineering and Technology, Palai

Choondacherry is an Indian village located in the Kottayam district of Kerala state, India.

== Etymology ==
Choondacherry got its name from "choondal" meaning "place where water is abundant" and "cherry" meaning village. Another possibility of origin of the name Choondacherry is that "choonda" means "fishing rod", which are made from palms which are found in abundance in the place, and "cherry" can also translate as "street".

== Location ==
Choondacherry is located 3 km from Bharananganam and 4 km from Pravithanam. Choondacherry is rich with its culture and heritage. it is just 3 km away from the holy land of St. Alphonsa. The Vezhanganam Mahadeva Temple^{[usurped]} and St. Joseph's Church are the important worship places.

== Schools ==
Choondacherry is served by the three educational institutions, St. Joseph's College of Engineering and Technology, St. Joseph's Institute of Hotel Management and Sanjos Public School.

== Crops and Agriculture ==
Rubber cultivation in the major agricultural activities among people living in Choondacherry. Along with rubber, coconuts, wide varies of bananas, tapioca and other fruits and vegetables.
