= St. Augustine's Higher Secondary School, Karimkunnam =

High school in Kerala, India

Coordinates: 9.852569°N 76.688719°E

Information
- Religious affiliation: Catholic
- Established: 1938; 88 years ago
- Staff: c.50
- Gender: Mixed
- Enrollment: c.800

St. Augustine's Higher Secondary School, Karimkunnam in Idukki district, Kerala is a co-educational institution established in 1938 which is run by the Knanaya Catholic Archdiocese of Kottayam. The school is operated by the corporate educational agency of the archdiocese.

St. Augustine's upgraded into a higher secondary school in 1998. The school has 800 students with a staff establishment of 50, and its current local manager is Fr. James Vadakkekandankary.
