= Ullanadu =

- Village
- Nickname: Ulandu
- Location within Kerala Location within India
- Coordinates: 9.7493°N 76.7238°E
- Country: India
- State: Kerala
- District: Kottayam
- Municipality: Pala
- Panchayat: Bharananganam
- PIN: 686651

Ullanadu is a village located in Bharananganam panchayat, Pala, Kottayam district in the Indian state of Kerala. The village houses around 1000 families.

== Amenities ==
Ullanadu supports a primary health center, veterinary hospital, cooperative bank, post office, and library. The main religious institutions are SH Church, Mahadeva Temple, Sree Narayana Temple, Shanthi Bhavan(donated by ottathengumkal family)and SH UP School.

Nadukani view tourist attraction is situated near Ullanadu.Vazheparambil is one of ancient family in ullanadu.

Ullanadu is known for its lush greenery and marks the beginning of the hill region, with steep roads that follow beyond this point. The landscape is dominated by expansive rubber plantations, often intercropped with commercially grown pineapples. The soil here is notably fertile, though much of the terrain is rocky and features sharp slopes, adding to the region’s unique and rugged charm

== Culture ==
The main locations of Prithviraj starred Kangaroo were in and around Ullanadu.
