= Manathoor =

Manathoor Pizhaku
- small village
- Location in Kerala, India Manathoor (India)
- Coordinates: 9°48′45″N 76°38′30″E
- Country: India
- State: Kerala
- District: Kottayam
- Talukas: Meenachil

Area
  - Total: 3 km^{2} (1.2 sq mi)

Population
  - Total: 2,500
  - Density: 833/km^{2} (2,160/sq mi)

Languages
  - Official: Malayalam, English
- Time zone: UTC+5:30 (IST)
- PIN: 686651
- Telephone code: 04822
- Vehicle registration: KL 35
- Nearest city: Pala
- Literacy: 100%
- Lok Sabha constituency: Kottayam
- Vidhan Sabha constituency: Pala
- Climate: 24c 36c (Köppen)

Manathoor is a small village in Kottayam district, aside Pala - Thodupuzha Highway, 12 km from Palai town and 15 km from Thodupuzha town.

It lies aside of Main Eastern Highway (SH-8). It lies In eastern part of Kottayam District and shares its north-eastern border with Idukki District.

It is also known as Pizhaku.

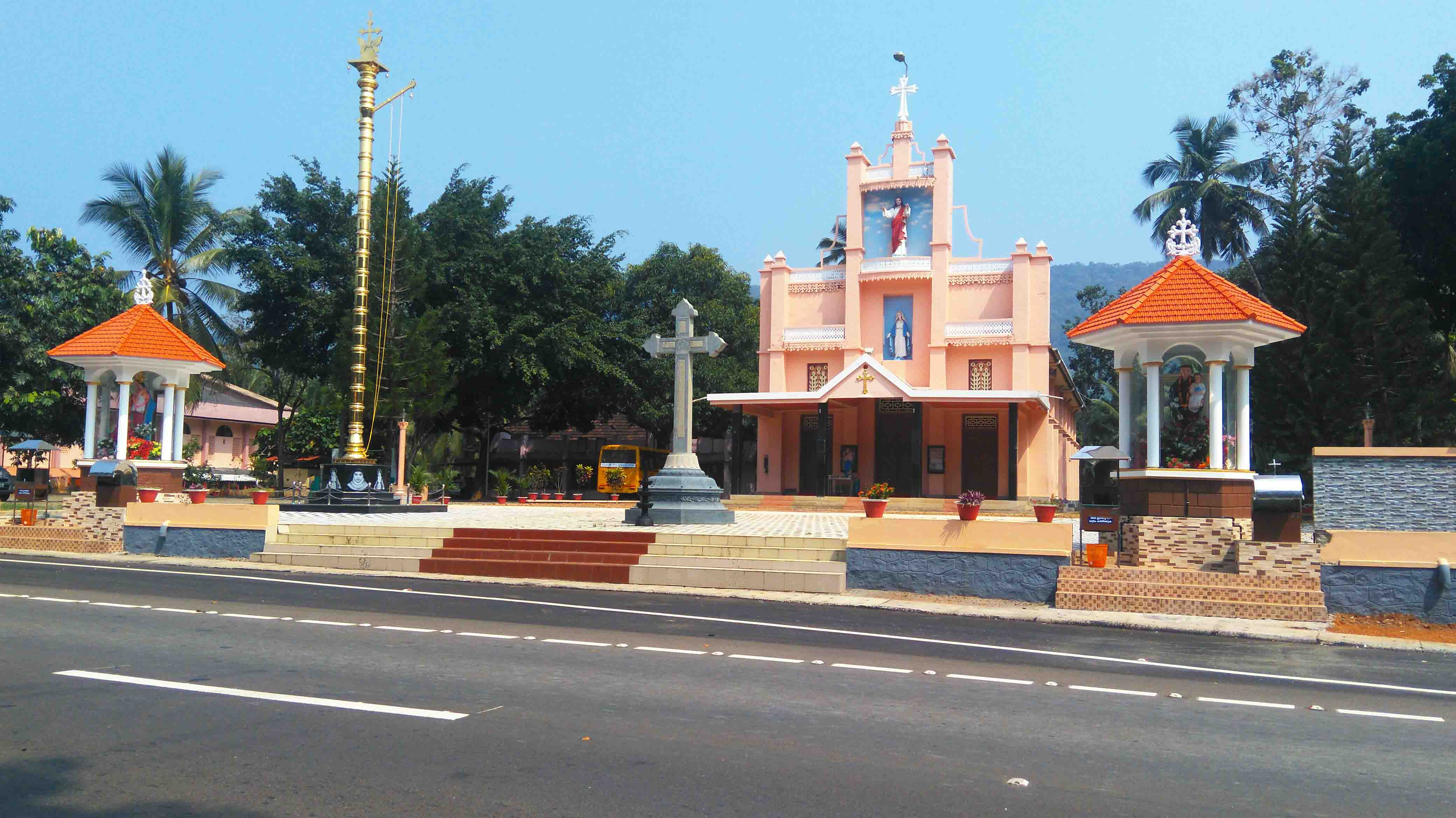
St. Mary's Church Manathoor (Syro Malabar Catholic Church)

== Demography and religion ==
Around 750 families are living here. The majority of the people here are Christians and Hindus. All religions and culture live in religious harmony.

The Christian community belongs to St. Thomas Christians (Marthoma Nazrani) or Catholic Syrian Christians (RCSC). St. Mary's Church Manathoor, Pizhaku is the only church in this village. They follows Syro - Malabar Rite in Qurbana. It is under the Eparchy of Palai. Many ancient families are found here. The community has a shrine dedicated to Saint Joseph near Manathoor School Junction. During the period of Lent, the "Way of the Cross Procession" takes place to the Kurishu Mala in Manathoor - Karimkunnam Road. The birthday of Mother Mary, 7 and 8 September, is celebrated as feast days of the church. The parish has almost 410 families.

The Pizhaku Thrikkayil Sri Krishna Swami temple is very ancient. There was also a Palace associated with the temple. (Pizhakum Kottaram). This is near to Manathoor School junction. SNDP temple was newly constructed and dedicated to Sri Narayana Guru. During Sri Krishna Jayanthi Procession is held. Sapthaha Yajnam is conducted in Month of Nov - Jan. Utsavam falls in the month of January.

=== Name ===
The true name of Manathoor village is Pizhaku. The parish name caused this area to be known as Manathoor in the 1900s. In all records related to land and surveys, the place name is purely Pizhaku (Pizhakum Kara). The location of post office of Pizhaku at Ramapuram Kavala made boosting for the name Manathoor more popular when Ramapuram Kavala came to be known as Pizhaku Junction.

The meaning of Manathoor can be split into two words Maanath (meaning: Sky) and Ooru (meaning: Place).

== Geography ==
This village is almost between Palai and Thodupuzha and post office is Pizhaku at Ramapuram Kavala. The neighbouring villages are Kurinji, Karimkunnam, Nellappara in North, Mattathippara, Kavumkandom in east, Ramapuram in west. The nearest railway station is kottayam. Nearest airport is Cochin.

Manathoor has low-lying areas as well as Mountains. The Pala - Thodupuzha Highway passes through the centre of Manathoor. The road lies in a valley, where both sides are elevated.

There are two main junctions in Manathoor: Church junction and school junction. The main spots in this village are Pampanal waterfall, St.Mary's Church, St.Joseph's High School, and Sri Krishna Temple.

== Climate and agriculture ==
Manathoor's climate is neither too hot nor cold. June to November is the rainy season. The temperature varies from 20 degree Celsius to 36 degree Celsius which is almost constant throughout the year. During the start of monsoon rain, Pampanal waterfall is fuller than in other seasons. The place has mist-covered mountains and valleys.

The area's geographical position is suitable for the cultivation of rubber, pepper, coconut and vanilla. A majority of families have rubber plantations. There are some paddy fields as well. Major cultivation here is rubber and coconut.

== Gallery ==
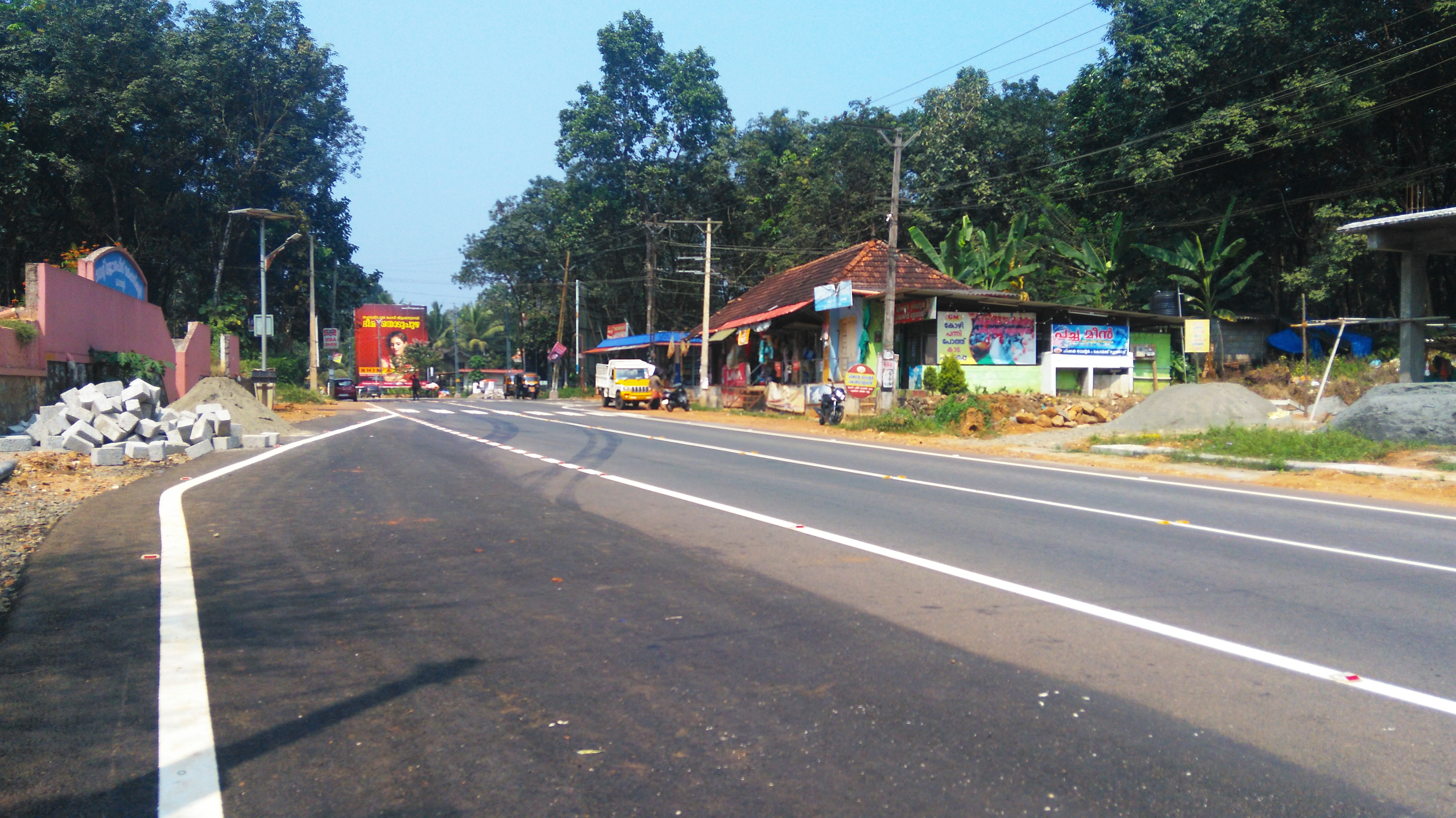
Manathoor School Junction

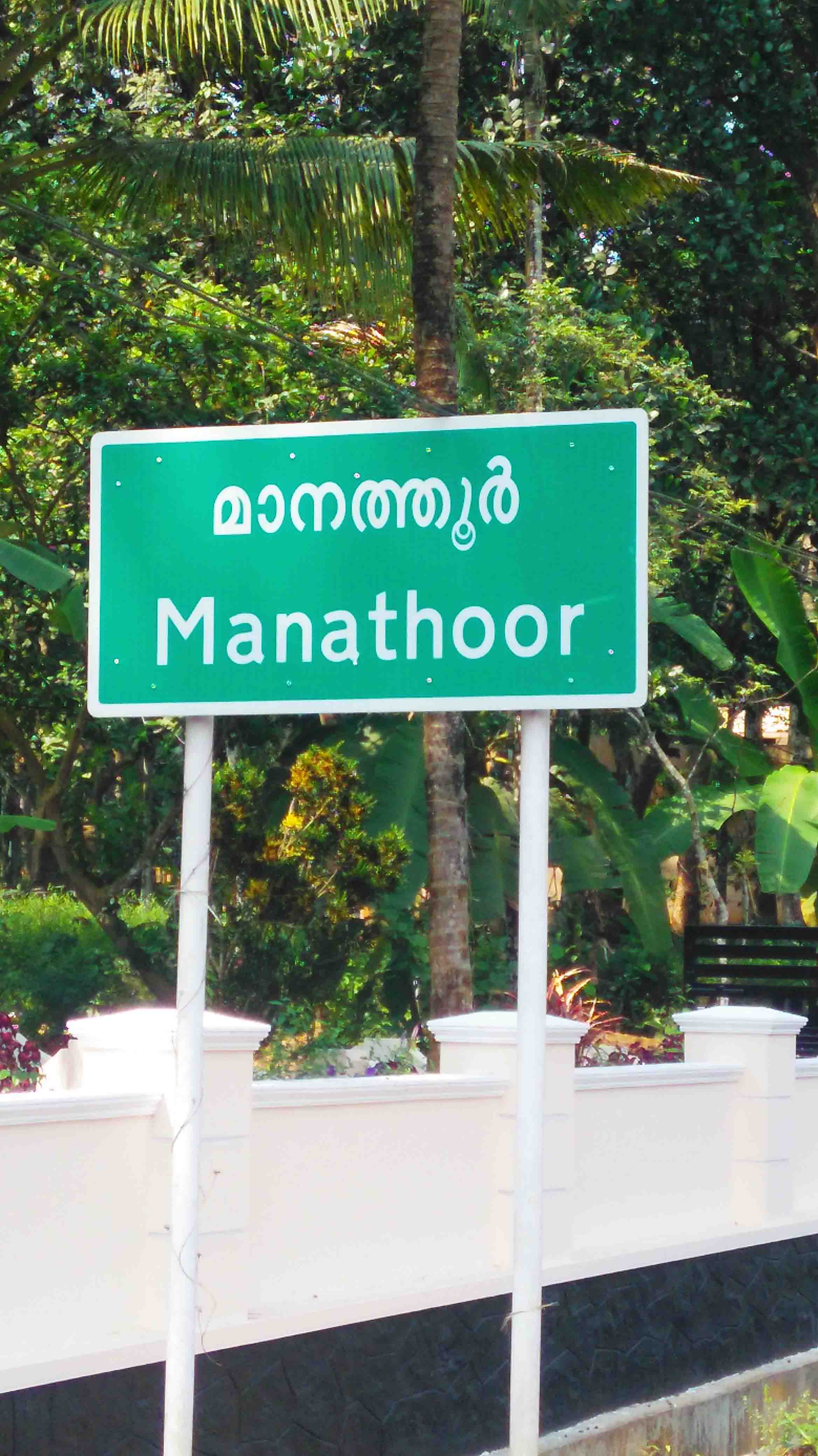
Board On Pala-Thodupuzha Highway Inserted By KSTP

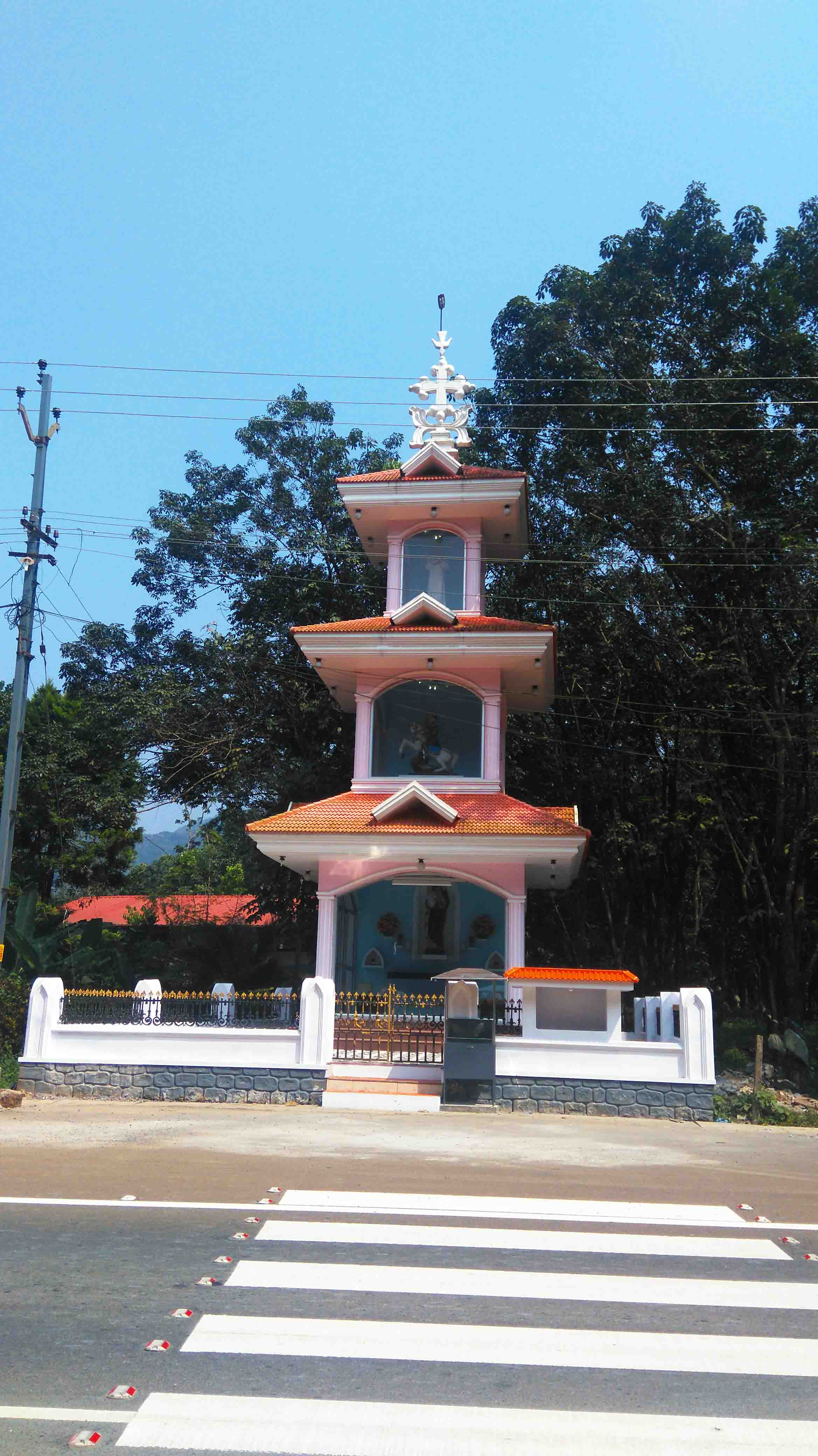
St. Joseph's KurishPally

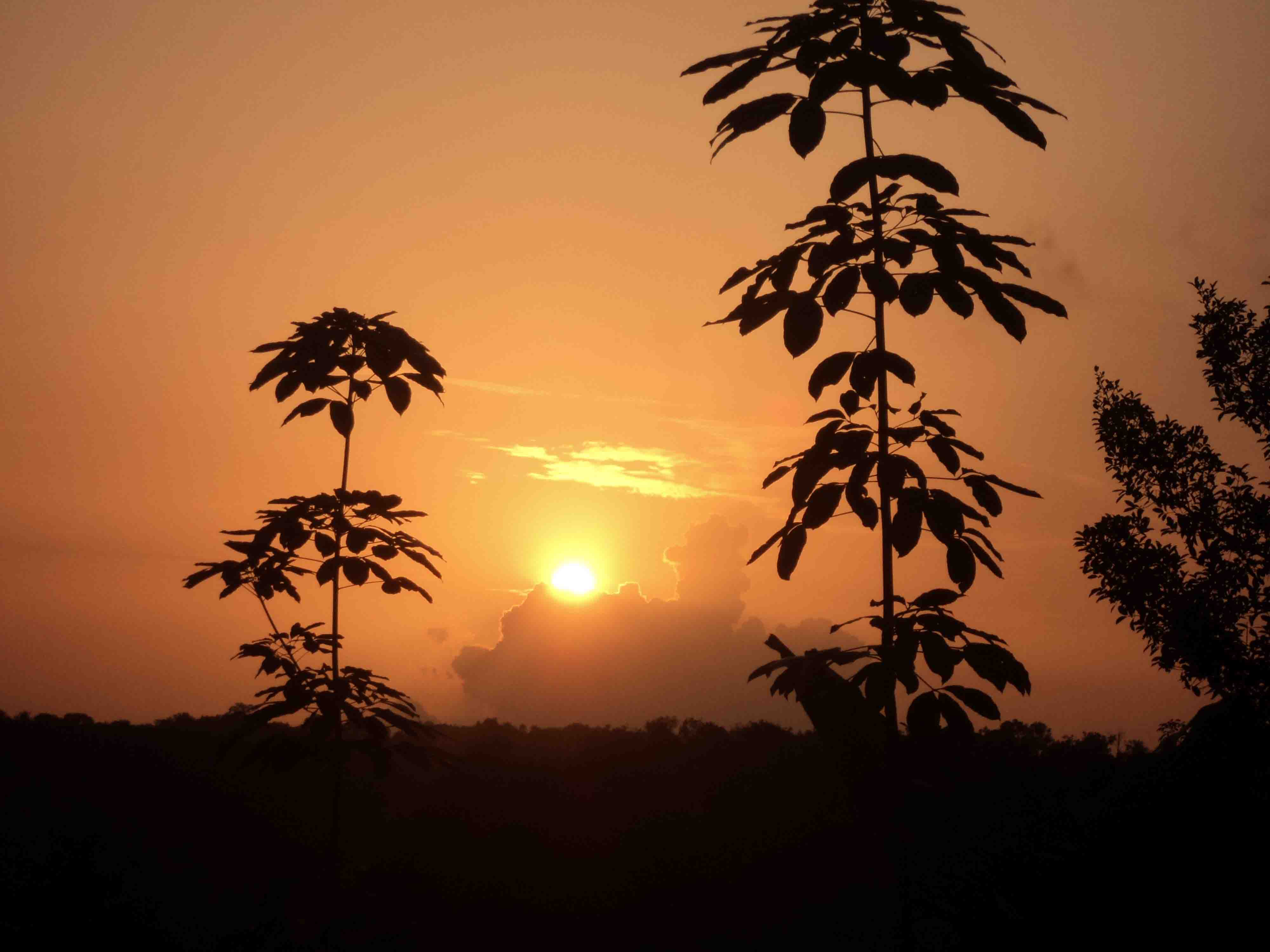
Sunset View among Rubber trees at Manathoor

St. Joseph's High School Manathoor

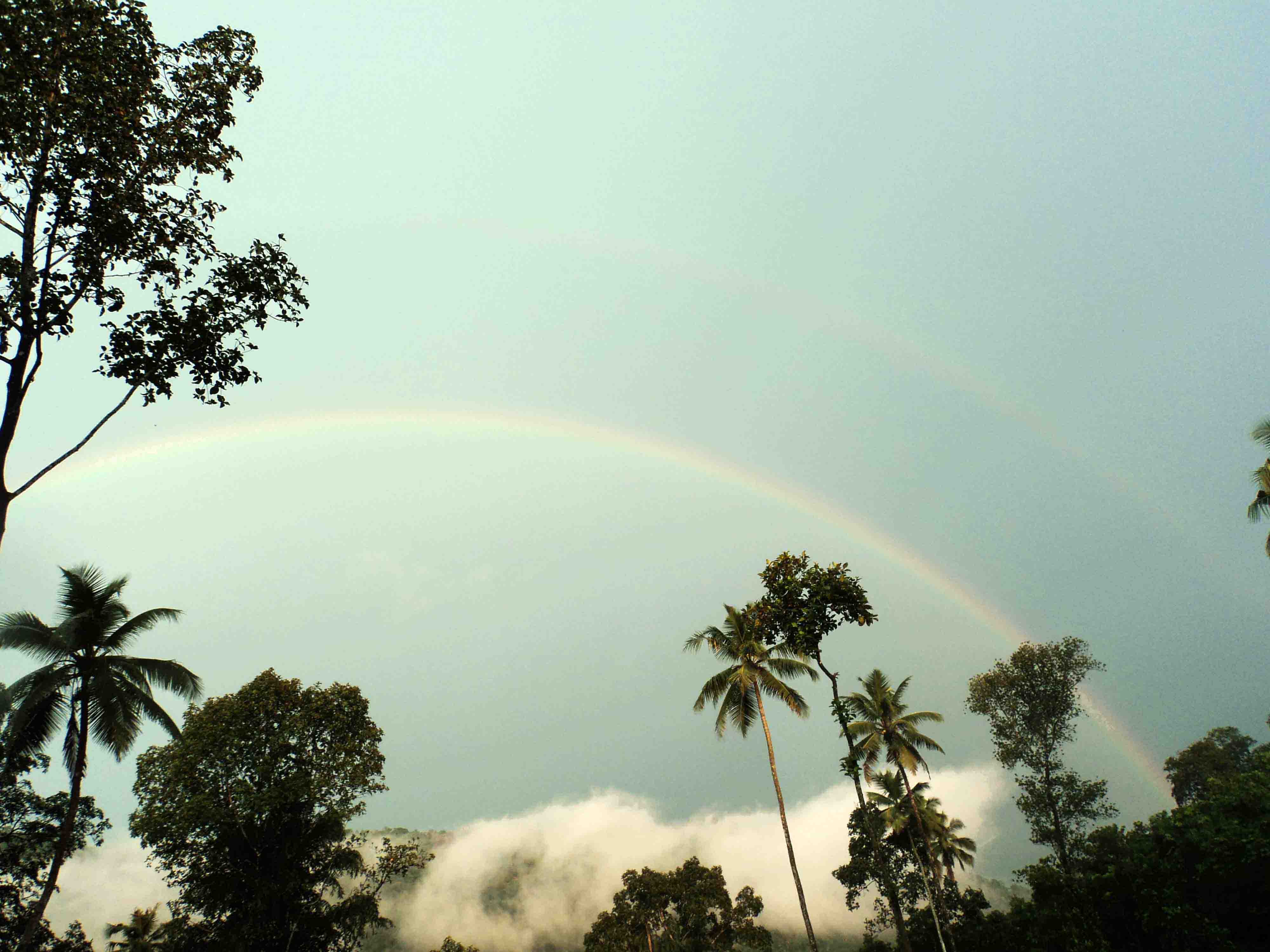
Mist Covered view of Hill from Manathoor

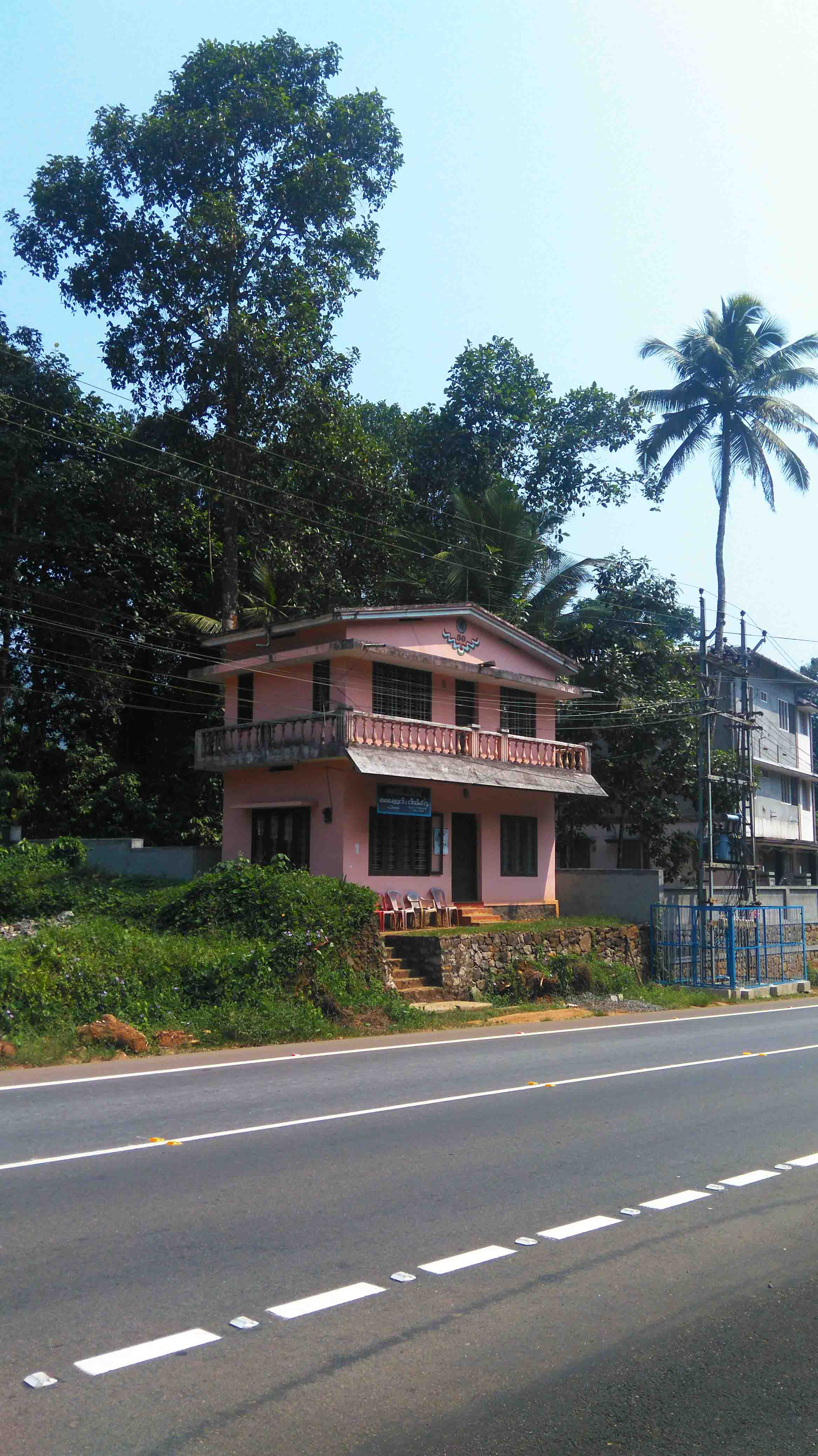
JaiHind Library

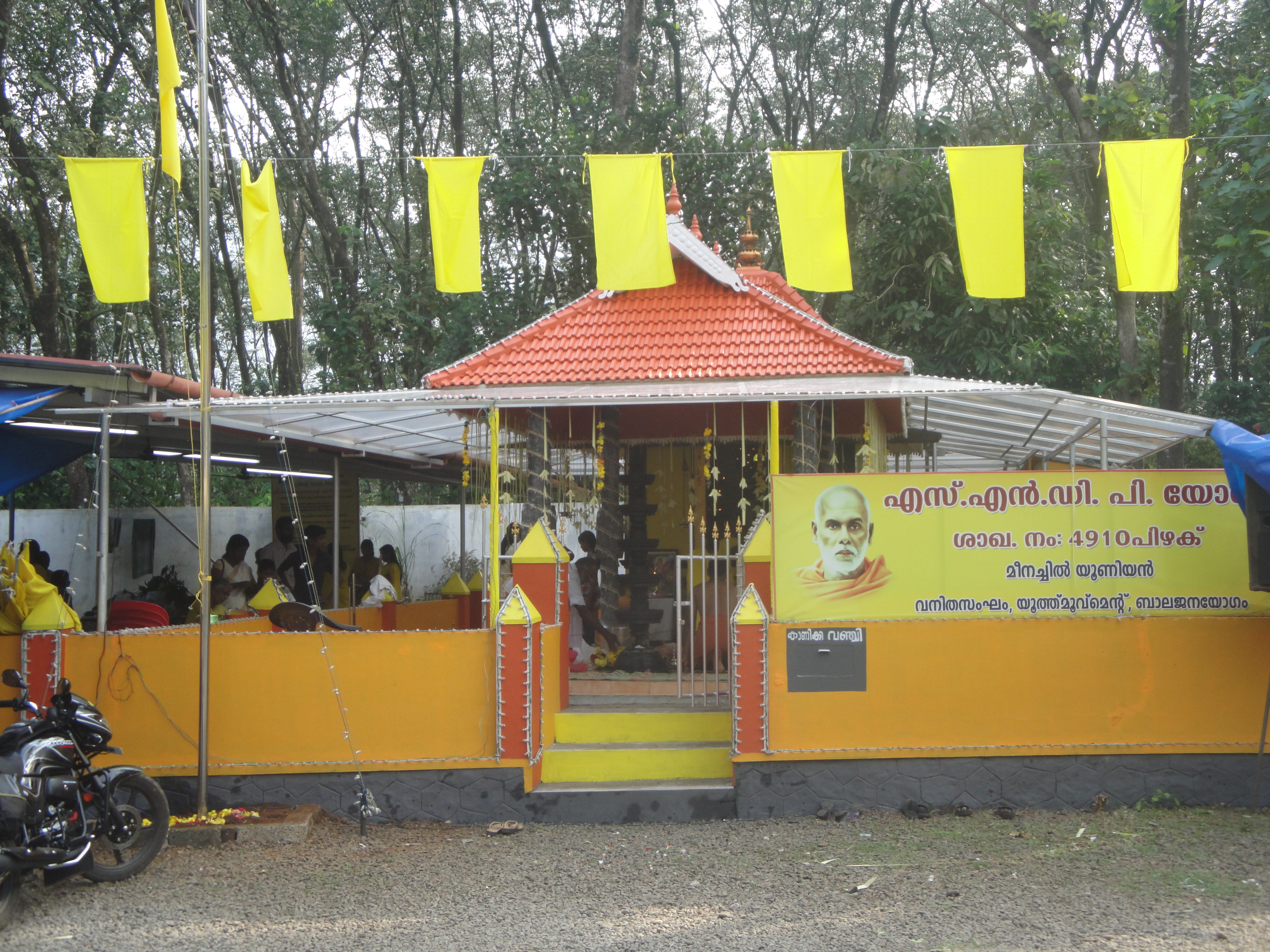
Pizhaku SNDP Temple
