= Plassanal =

- Village
- Location in Kerala, India Plassanal (India)
- Coordinates: 9°42′30.1″N 76°45′41.1″E
- Country: India
- State: Kerala
- District: Kottayam

Government
  - Body: Gram Panchayat

Languages
  - Official: Malayalam, English
- Time zone: UTC+5:30 (IST)
- PIN: 686579
- Telephone code: 04822
- Vehicle registration: KL- 35
- Literacy: 100%
- Lok Sabha constituency: Kottayam
- Vidhan Sabha constituency: Pala

Plassanal is a very small town in Kottayam district, state of Kerala, India. It is 4 km northwest of the town of Erattupetta.

== Places of interest ==
- Discs and Machines - Sunny's Gramophone Museum and Records Archive: a private museum of gramophone players and a large collection of mainly 78 rpm disc records.

== Education ==
- St. Antony's Higher Secondary School
- Government Lower Primary School
- Plassanal Nursery School

== Hospitals ==
- Holy Family Hospital

== Religious places ==
- St. Mary's Church
- Incholikkavu Temple
- Carmelite Convent

== Accessibility: Nearest cities and towns ==
Nearest Airport - Cochin International Airport

Nearest Railway Station- Kottayam railway station

Distance to Cochin - 80 km

Distance to Kottayam - 37 km

Distance to Pala - 9 km

Distance to Bharananganam - 4 km
