= Kudayathoor =

- village
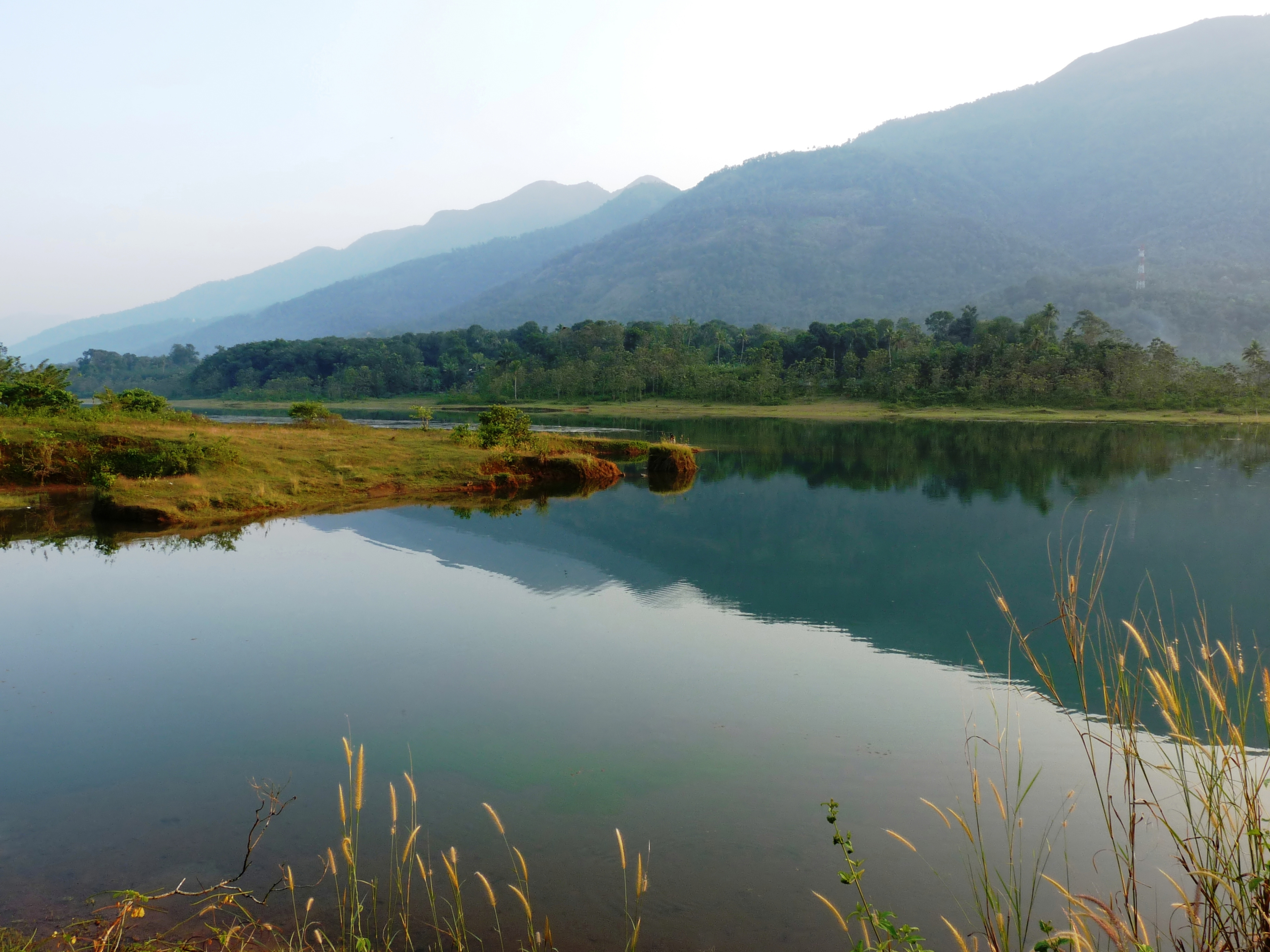
- Malankara Dam reservoir from Kudayathoor
- Interactive map of Kudayathoor
- Coordinates: 9°49′0″N 76°47′0″E
- Country: India
- State: Kerala
- District: Idukki

Population (2011)
  - Total: 10,080

Languages
  - Official: Malayalam, English
- Time zone: UTC+5:30 (IST)
- Vehicle registration: KL-38

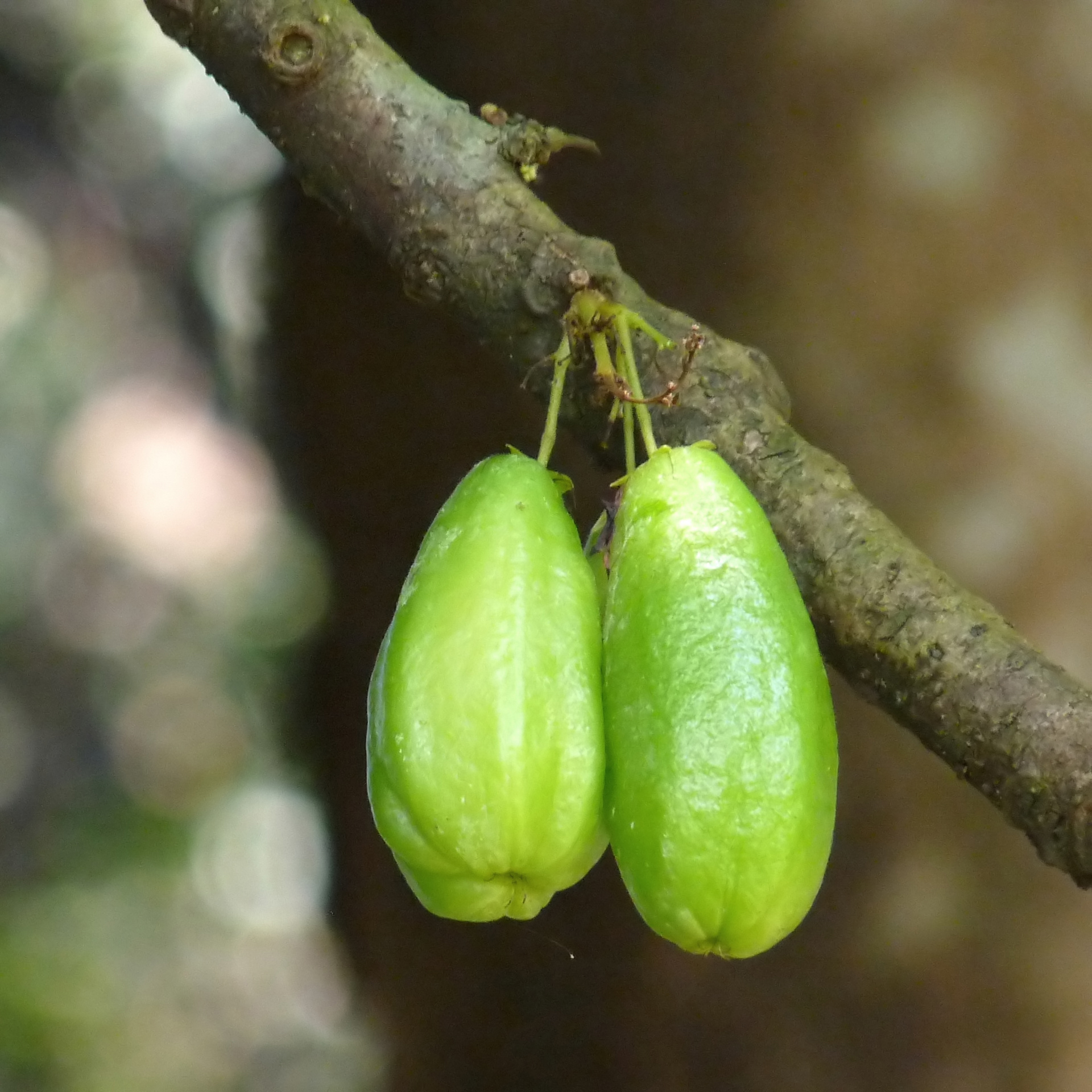
Averrhoa Bilimbi at Kudayathoor

Kudayathoor is a village in Idukki district which is located along the Thodupuzha-Puliyanmala road in the Indian state of Kerala. Kudayathoor is known for its scenery mostly because of the towering presence of Western ghats on one side. A number of Malayalam films have also been shot in this area, including Kunjikoonan, Vasanthiyum Lakshmiyum Pinne Njaanum, Vismayathumbathu, Drishyam, Kadha Parayumbol, Rasathanthram, Aadu, and Vellimoonga. Malankara dam, which is a hydro electric power plant located along Muvattupuzha river, in Muttom, uses this place as its catchment area.

== Demographics ==
As of 2011 India census, Kudayathoor had a population of 10080 with 5005 males and 5075 females.
