= Anthinad =

Anthinad Anthinadu
- Village
- Anthinad (Pala - Thodupuzha Road)
- Interactive map of Anthinad
- Coordinates: 9°45′20″N 76°42′5″E
- Country: India
- State: Kerala
- District: Kottayam

Government
  - Body: Grama Panchayat

Languages
  - Official: Malayalam
- Time zone: UTC+5:30 (IST)
- PIN: 686651
- Vehicle registration: KL- 35
- Nearest city: Pala
- Lok Sabha constituency: Kottayam
- Civic agency: Grama Panchayat
- Climate: cool

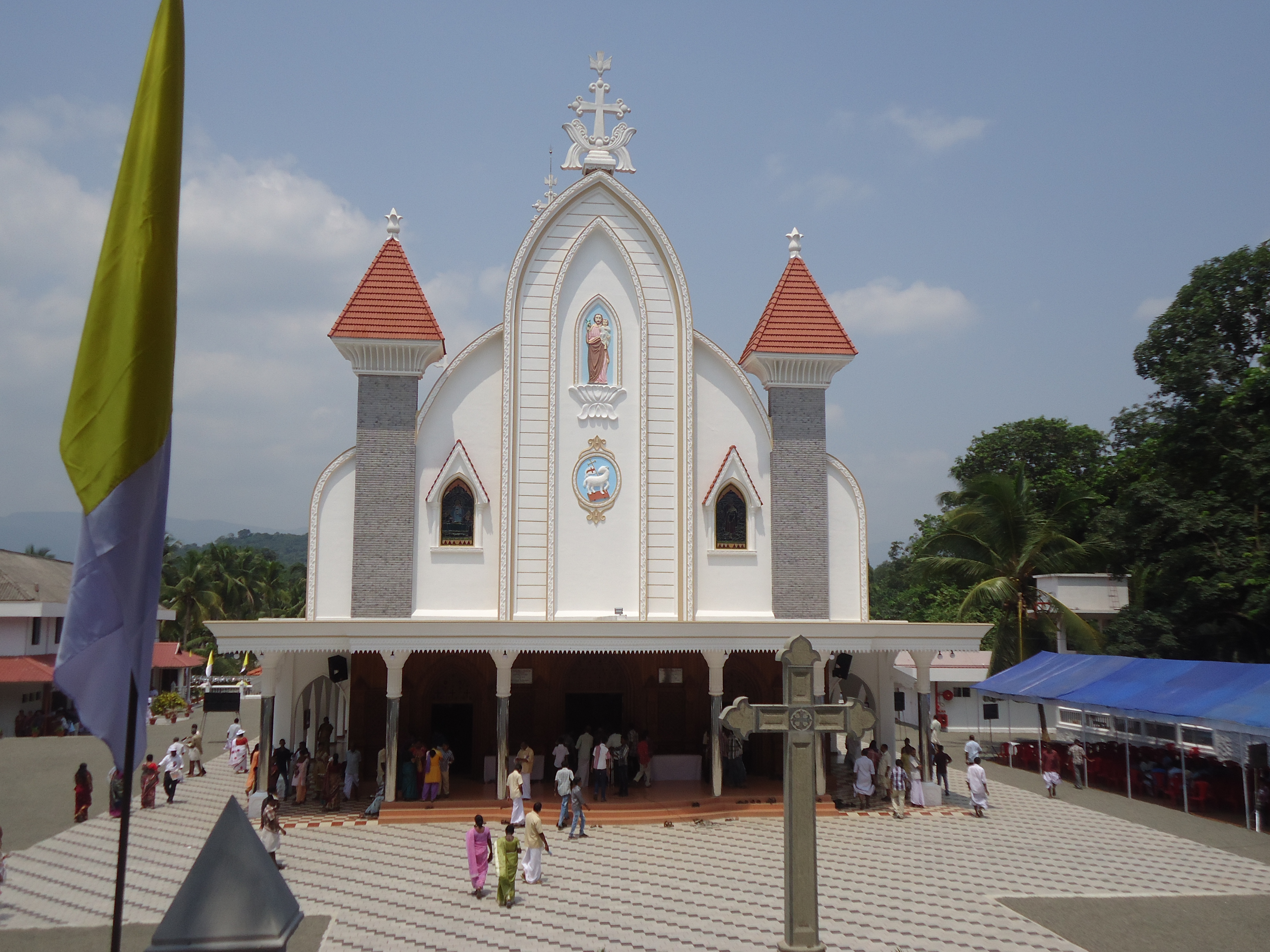
St Joseph's Church Anthinad

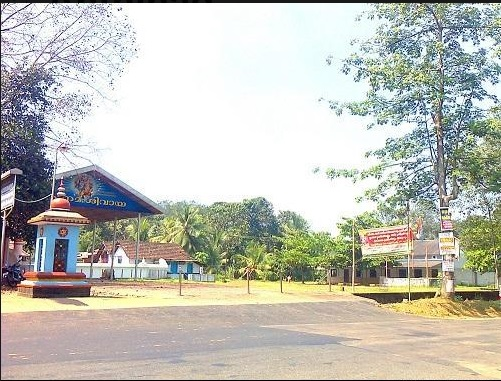
Anthinad Bus stop

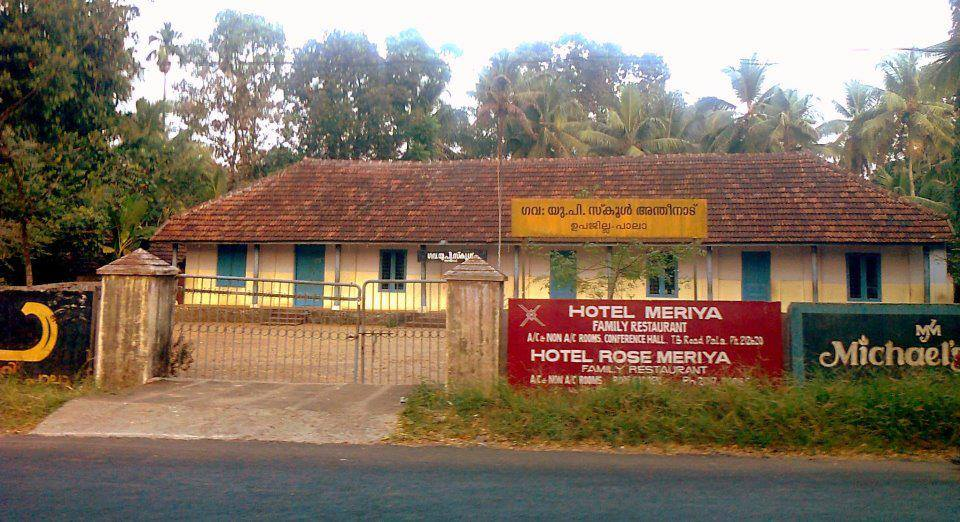
Anthinad School

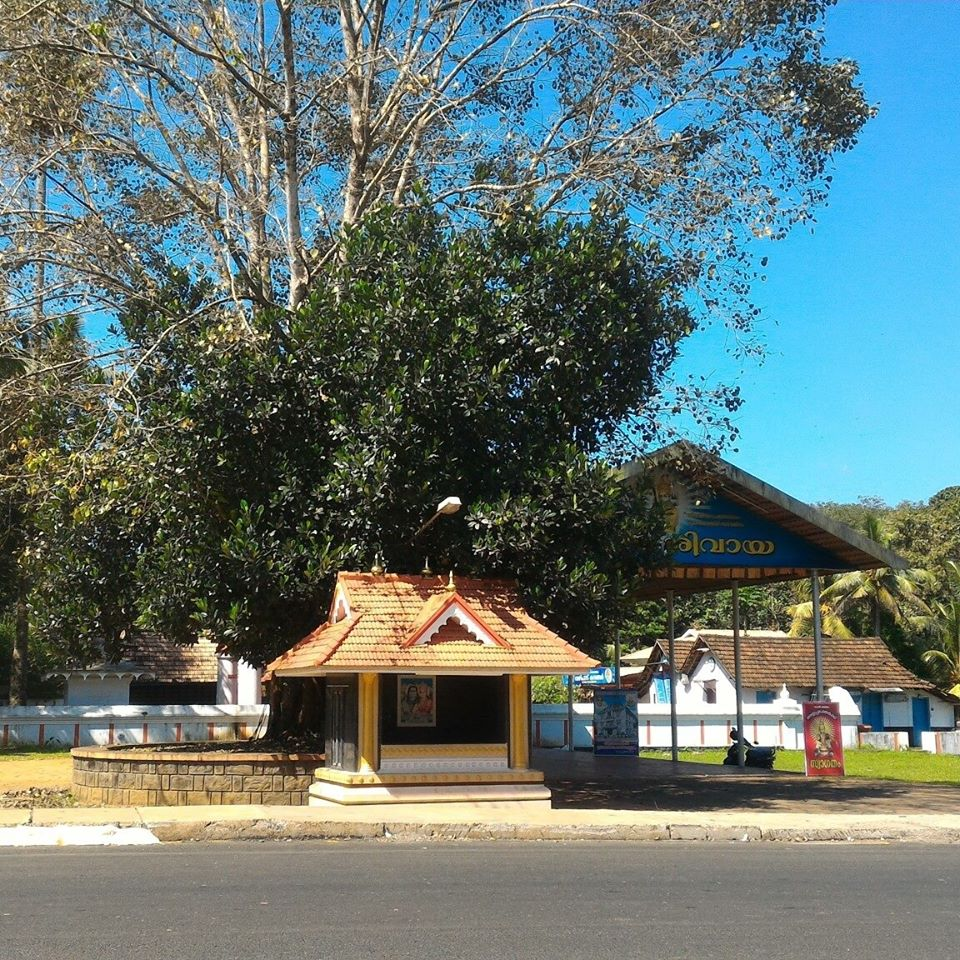
Sree Mahadeva Temple Anthinad

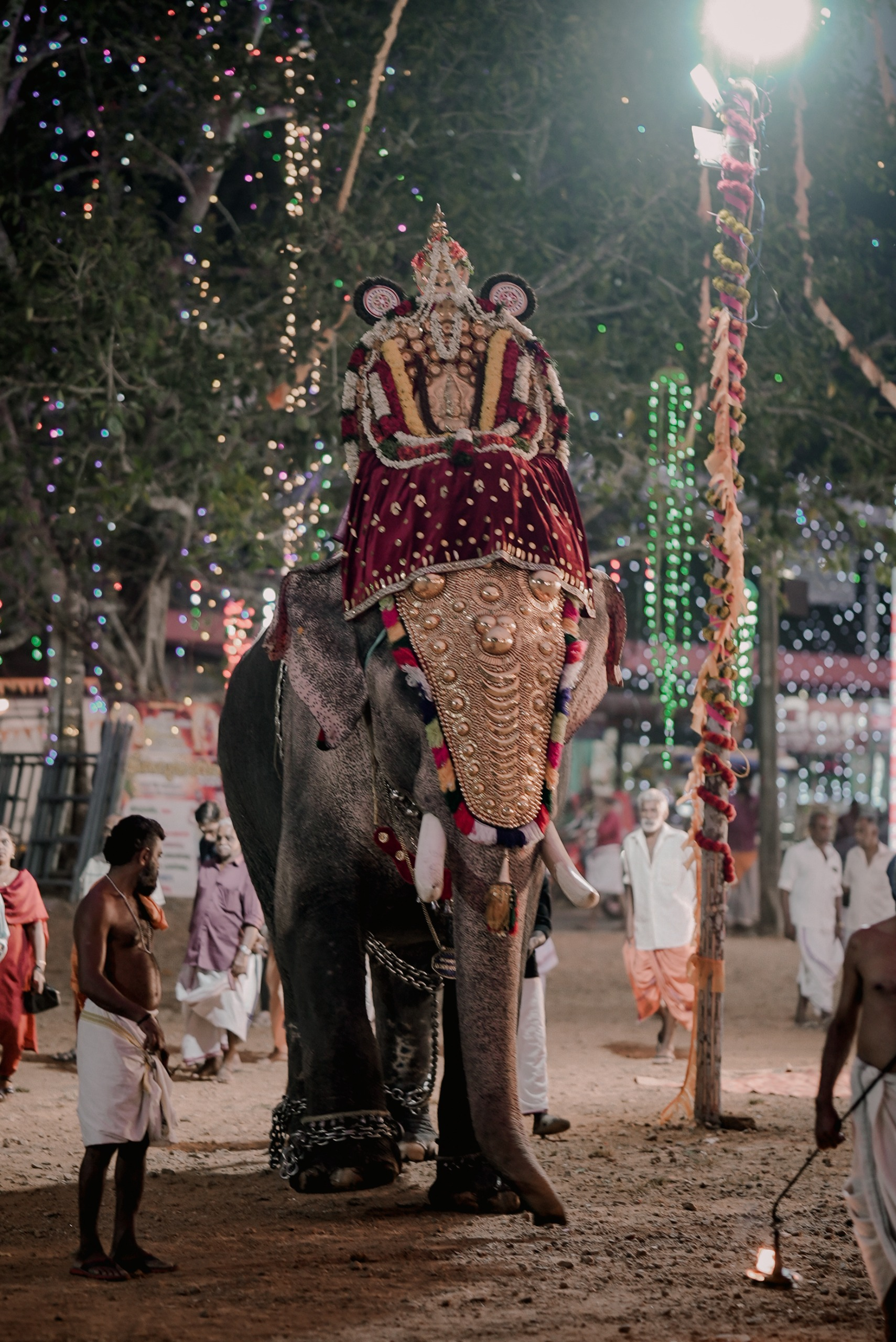
Anthinad Temple Ulsav

Anthinad is a small agricultural village in Kottayam district (Meenachil Taluk) situated about 6 kilometres away from Palai. The Main Eastern Highway (Muvattupuzha - Punalur Road) passes through Anthinad and connects it to two of its neighboring towns, Thodupuzha and Pala.

== Landmarks ==
- Sree Mahadeva Temple Anthinad
- St Joseph's Church, Anthinad

== Hospitals ==
- MKM Hospital, Pravithanam, Anthinad

== Educational institutions ==
- Govt. UPS Anthinad
- Santhinilayam Special school, Anthinad

== Access ==
Anthinad is 35 km away from Kottayam (6 km from Pala) and 22 km from Thodupuzha. Buses ply from Pala and Thodupuzha to Anthinad very frequently. The nearest airport located at Nedumbassery (Cochin International Airport) approximately 65 km away, and the railway station is located at Ettumanoor. Anthinad is situated 180 km north from the state capital Thiruvananthapuram.

== Additional details ==
- Post office: Anthinad
- PIN code: 686651
- Panchayat: Karoor
- Taluk: Meenachil
- Nearest places: Kollappally, Pravithanam
- Telephone code : 04822
- Vehicle registration : KL35
- Lok Sabha constituency : Kottayam
- Legislative Assembly : Pala
