= Pizhaku =

- Village
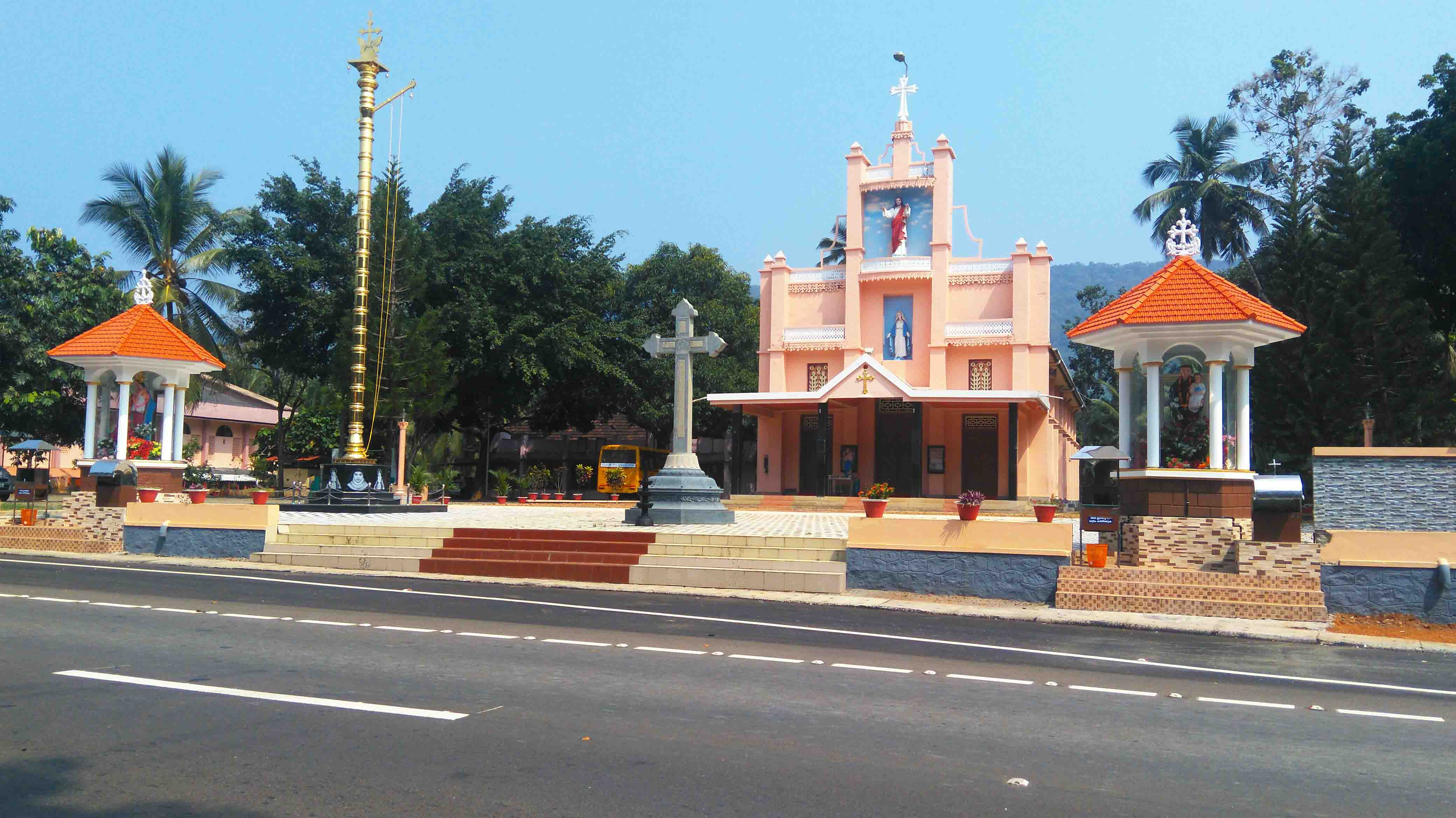
- St. Mary's Church Manathoor Pizhaku
- Interactive map of Pizhaku
- Coordinates: 9.8117182°N 76.6952234°E
- Country: India
- State: Kerala
- District: Kottayam
- Panchayat: Kadanad
- Taluk: Meenachil

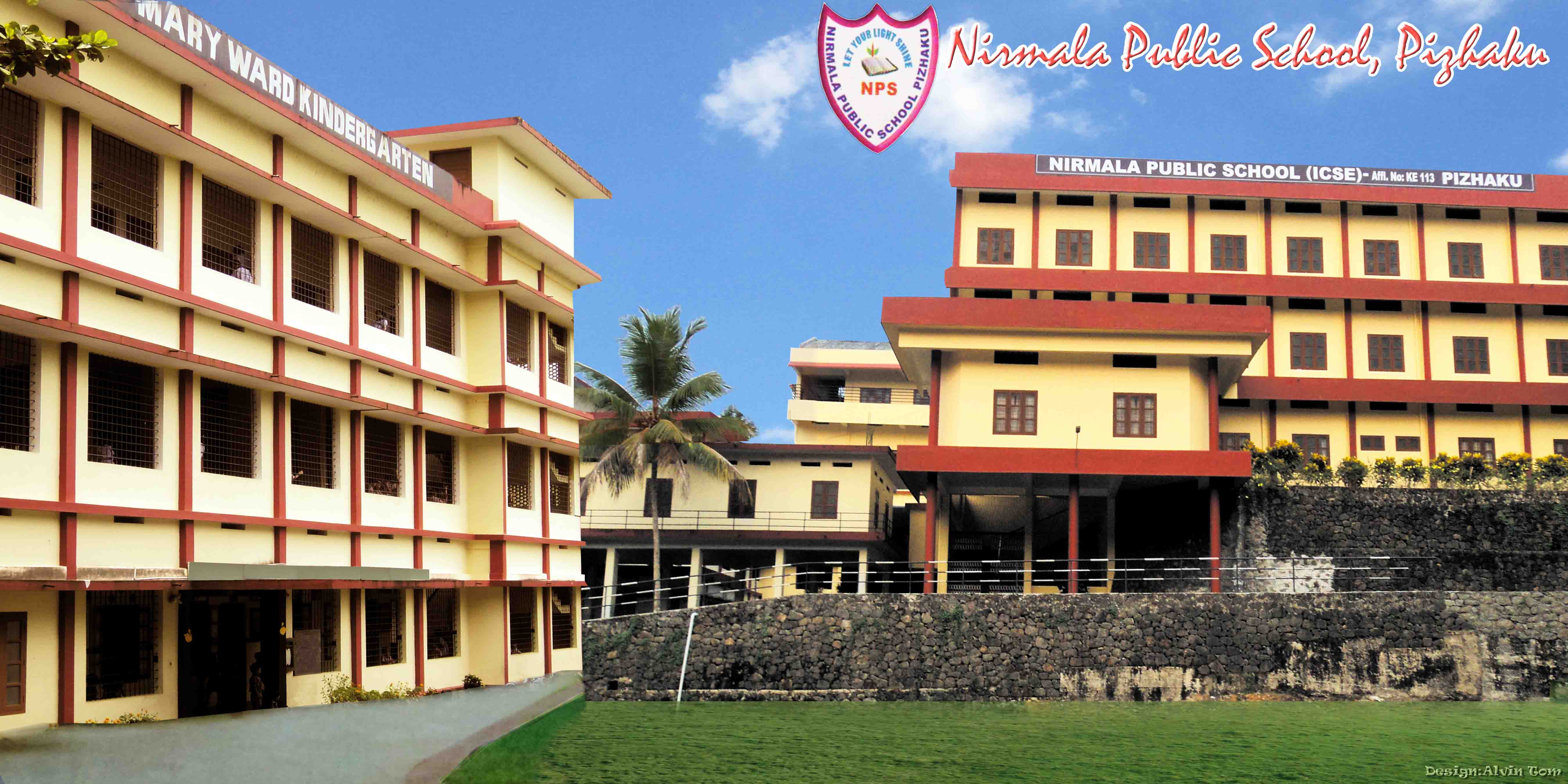
Nirmala Public School, Pizhaku

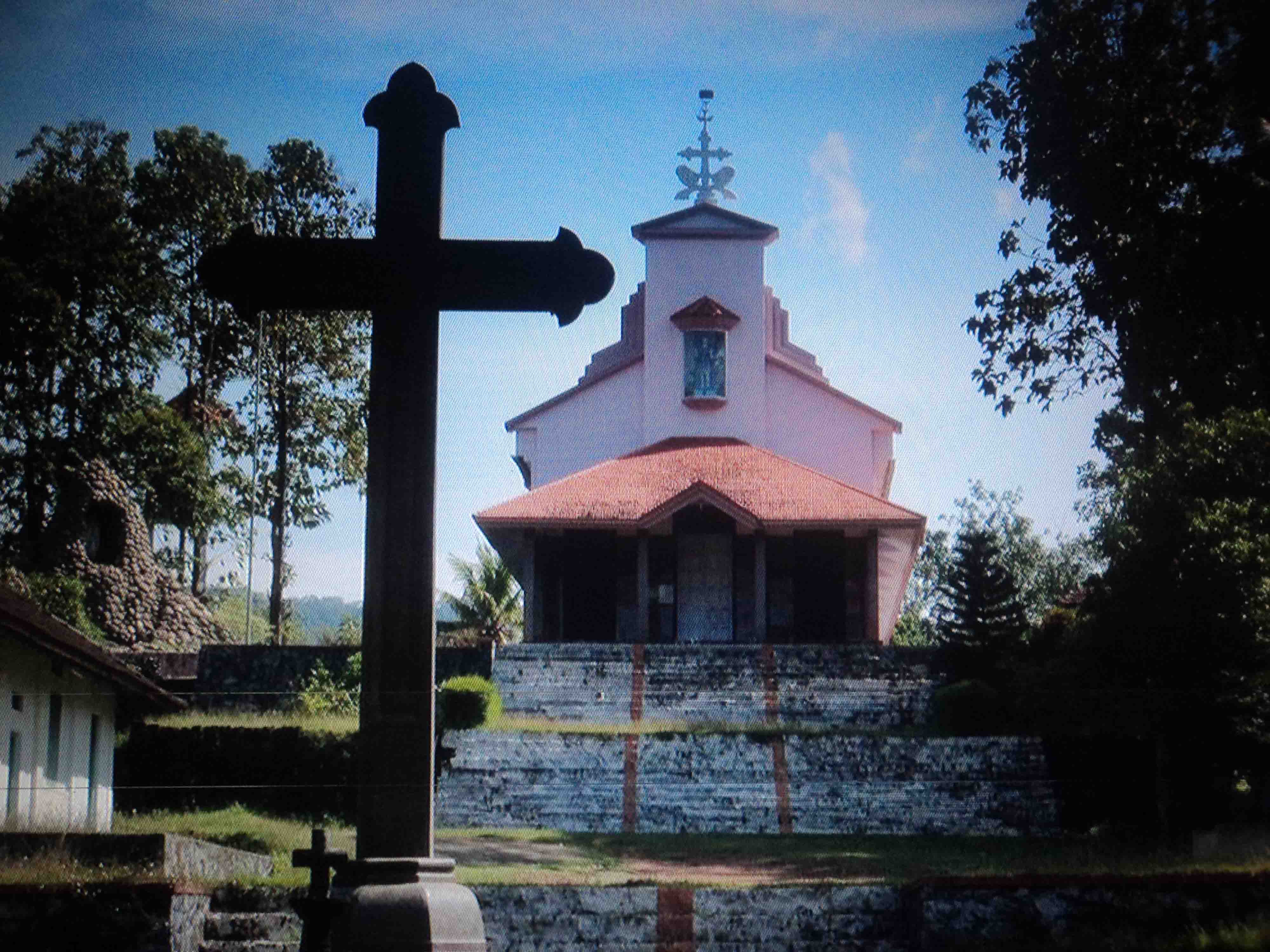
St. John the Baptist Church Urumbukavu Pizhaku

Pizhaku is a village in Kottayam District in the Indian state of Kerala.

== Geography ==
Pizhaku lies 12 km (7.5 mi) from Palai and 16 km (9.9 mi) from Thodupuzha. The area is covered with mountains, plains, and trees.

== Educational institutions ==
There are two schools in Pizhaku:

- Nirmala Public School, Pizhaku
- St. Joseph's High school, Manathoor, Pizhaku

== Attractions ==
The Pampanal Waterfall at Manathoor is the major attraction of Pizhaku. Vyakula Sanketham, churches, and temples are other attractions.

== Post Office ==
The post office of Pizhaku is located at Ramapuram Kavala Junction with Speed Post Facility. Pincode: 686651

== Banks ==
State Bank of Travancore has a branch at Pizhaku located at Ramapuram Kavala Junction.

=== Co-Operative Bank ===
In 1979, KSCB (The Kadanad Service Co-operative Bank Ltd. K2) opened its first branch in Manathoor Church Junction, Pizhaku.

== Demography and religion ==
Pizhaku has a population of 4000. Majority of them are Syro Malabar Catholics.

The Pizhaku Thrikkayil temple is very ancient. There was Palace associated with the temple. This is near to Manathoor School Junction. SNDP temple was newly constructed and dedicated to Sri Narayana Guru.

The Syro Malabar Catholics have two Parishes - Manathoor and Urumbukavu. Both are under Kadanad Forane (earlier Ramapuram forane) in Palai Diocese. They are Syrian Catholics of many ancient families can be found here.

Before 1910 Pizhaku was under the parish of Kadanad. In 1910 St. Mary's Church Manathoor at Pizhaku is established to help the Catholic migrants in Pizhaku area as it was difficult for them to attend church services at Kadanad church, which was 4 km away. It became an independent Parish in October 1928 and Fr. Thomas Parekunnel was appointed as first parish priest. There are around 2000 faithful from 410 families.

St. John the Baptist Church is situated at Ramapuram Kavala. Though this church is commonly known as Makkalpally (Makkal church), the name of this church is mentioned as ‘Urumbukavu pally’ in the records. Urumbukavu church, which remained as the Kurisupally of Ramapuram Forane church, became a parish church since 1 February 1954 as per the circular No. 112, issued on 26 January 1954 by the Bishop of Pala Mar Sebastian Vayalil. There are around 220 families with 1050 faithful.

Main Centres:

- St. Mary's Church Manathoor
- St. John the Baptist Church Urumpukavu
- Pizhaku Thrikkayil SreeKrishna Swami Temple
- SNDP temple
- Nirmala Public School
- St. Joseph's High School
- Kadanad Co-op Bank
- SBT

Convents:

- Congregation of Jesus Convent (Mary Ward Convent)
- Sacred Heart Convent
- Carmillite convent

== Political map ==
The Pizhaku Comes under the Pala Legislative Assembly Constituency and Kottayam Parliamentary Constituency. Kadanad Panchayath has two wards here namely Pizhaku and Manathoor.

Country	India
State	Kerala
District	Kottayam
Talukas	Meenachil (Kadanadu Panchayath)
Area
• Total	6 km^{2}
Population
• Total	3500
• Density	580/ km^{2}
Languages
• Official	Malayalam, English
Time zone	IST (UTC+5:30)
PIN	686651
Telephone code	04822
Vehicle registration	KL 35
Nearest city	Pala
Literacy	100%
Lok Sabha constituency	Kottayam
Vidhan Sabhaconstituency	Pala
Climate	24c 36c (Köppen)
