= Karimkunnam, Idukki =

Karimkunnam
- village
- Location in Kerala, India Karimkunnam (India)
- Coordinates: 9°51′0″N 76°41′0″E
- Country: India
- State: Kerala
- District: Idukki

Government
  - Type: Panchayati raj (India)
  - Body: Gram panchayat

Population (2011)
  - Total: 11,956

Languages
  - Official: Malayalam, English
- Time zone: UTC+5:30 (IST)
- PIN: 685586
- Vehicle registration: KL-38

Karimkunnam is a village in Idukki district in the Indian state of Kerala.

== Demographics ==
As of 2011 India census, Karimkunnam had a population of 11956 with 6024 males and 5932 females.

The Village of Karimkunnam falls in the Idukki District of the state of Kerala in India. The place has its own history which can be traced to 1000 A.D. As of 2001 India census, Karimkunnam had a population of 12188 people. The prosperity of karimkunnam starts in 1970’s with the arrival of high yield rubber plants. The introduction of rubber plants into the fertile land of karimkunnam proved a success. Farmers who were depend on paddy and other food crops turned to rubber cultivation. This revolution gave enough money for the local people which enabled them to provide better education for their children.

== Institutions ==
- Police station Karimkunnam
- State Bank of India Karimkunnam
- SSV Ayurvedic Clinic
- Cedar Hospital
- St.Augustine's Knanaya Catholic Church
- St. Augustine's Higher Secondary School, Karimkunnam
- Karimbanakkavu Devi Temple
- Kaithakkulangara Devi Temple
- Chakkiyallummala Devi Temple
- Little flower church
- Govt.L.P.School Karimkunnam
- SNDP Temple karimkunnam.
