= Muttam, Kannur =

Muttam Muttom
- village
- Interactive map of Muttam
- Coordinates: 12°01′0″N 75°25′0″E
- Country: India
- State: Kerala
- District: Kannur

Government
  - Body: Madayi Panchayath

Languages
  - Official: Malayalam, English
- Time zone: UTC+5:30 (IST)
- Postal code: 670305
- ISO 3166 code: IN-KL
- Nearest city: Payangadi, Kannur
- Lok Sabha constituency: Kasaragod
- Vidhan Sabha constituency: kalyaseri
- Civic agency: Madayi Panchayath

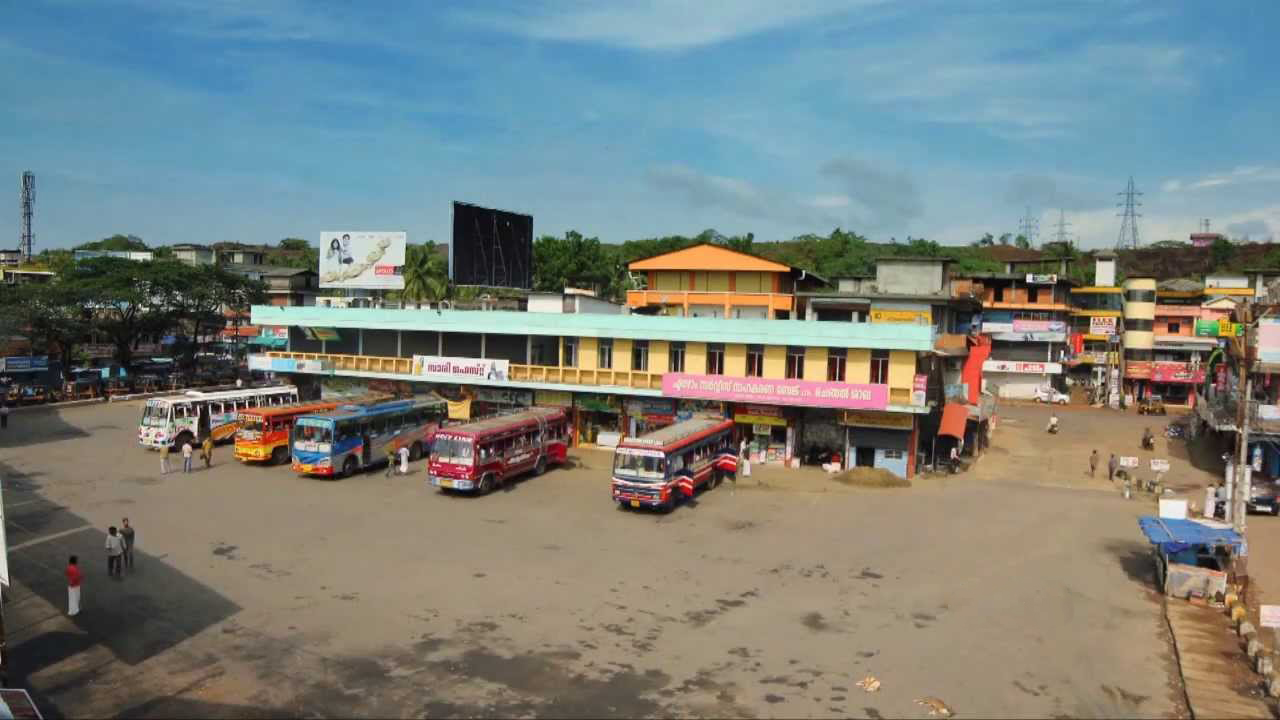
Pazhayangadi Bus Station

Muttam or "Muttom" is a small village located in the Indian Kannur District of Kerala. The Muttom Postal Pin Code is 685587.

== Religion ==
There are nearly 15 Muslim Mosques in Muttam. The prevalent religion in Muttam is Islam.

== Politics ==
Mixed political views. Majority support to Indian Union Muslim League

== Transportation ==
The national highway passes through Taliparamba town. Goa and Mumbai can be accessed on the northern side and Cochin and Thiruvananthapuram can be accessed on the southern side. The road to the east of Iritty connects to Mysore and Bangalore. The nearest railway station is Pazhayangadi on Mangalore-Palakkad line.

Trains are available to almost all parts of India subject to advance booking over the internet. There are three international airports at Mangalore, Kannur and Calicut, all with direct flights to Middle Eastern countries.

== See also ==
- Kannur District
- Payangadi
- Kannur
