= Bharananganam =

- Town
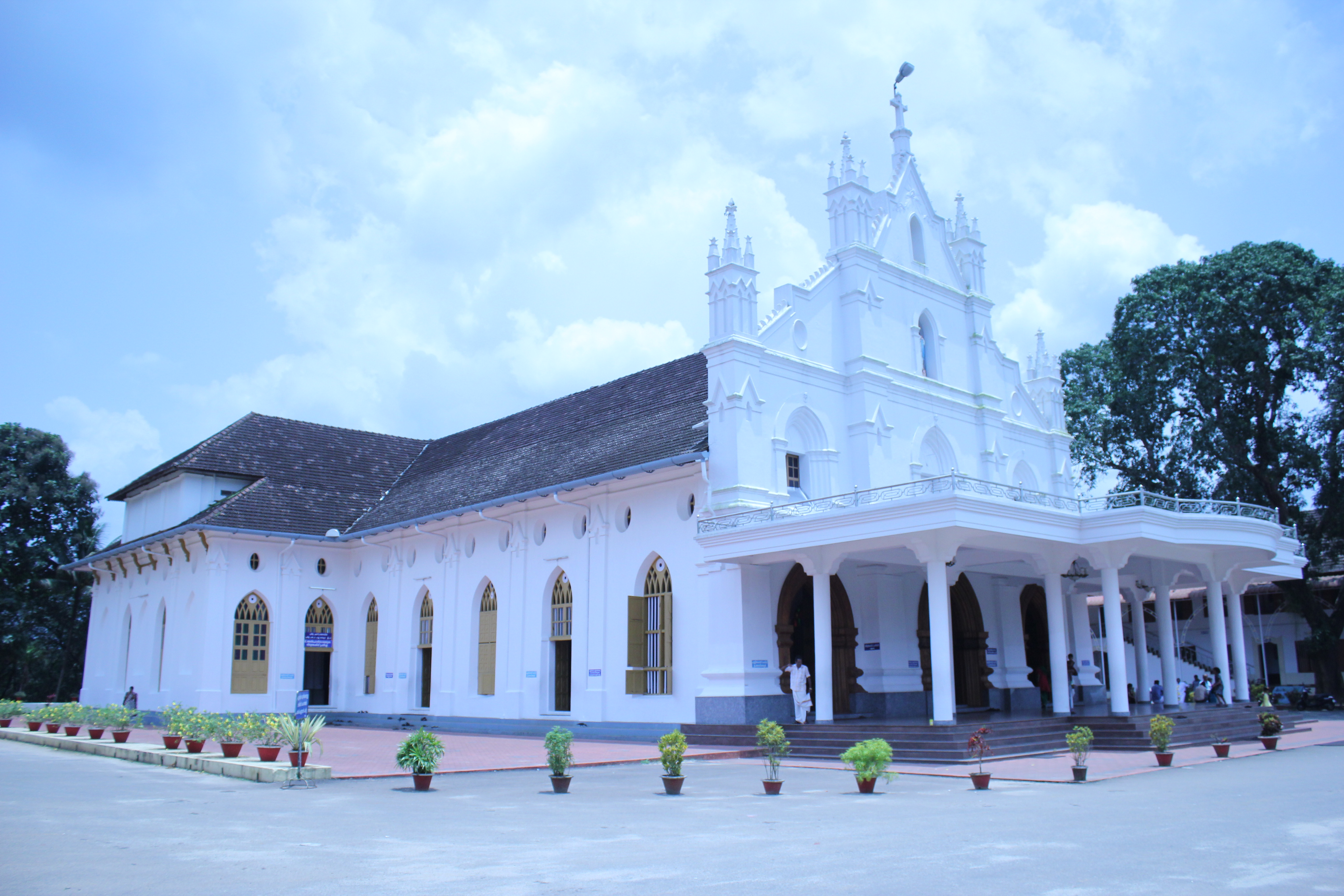
- Bharananganam Syro-Malabar Catholic Church
- Nickname: Lisieux of India
- Interactive map of Bharananganam
- Coordinates: 9°42′00″N 76°43′40″E
- Country: India
- State: Kerala
- District: Kottayam

Government
  - Body: Panchayath

Population
  - Total: 16,000

Languages
  - Official: Malayalam, English
- Time zone: UTC+5:30 (IST)
- PIN: 686578
- Telephone code: 914822
- Vehicle registration: KL- 35
- Literacy: 100%
- Lok Sabha constituency: Kottayam
- Vidhan Sabha constituency: Pala

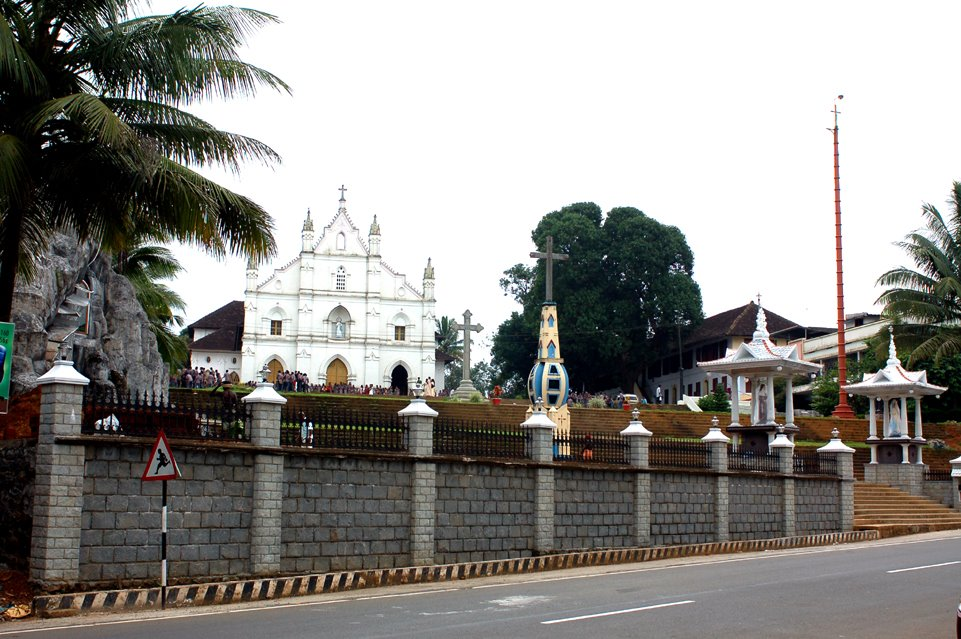
Bharanamganam Church

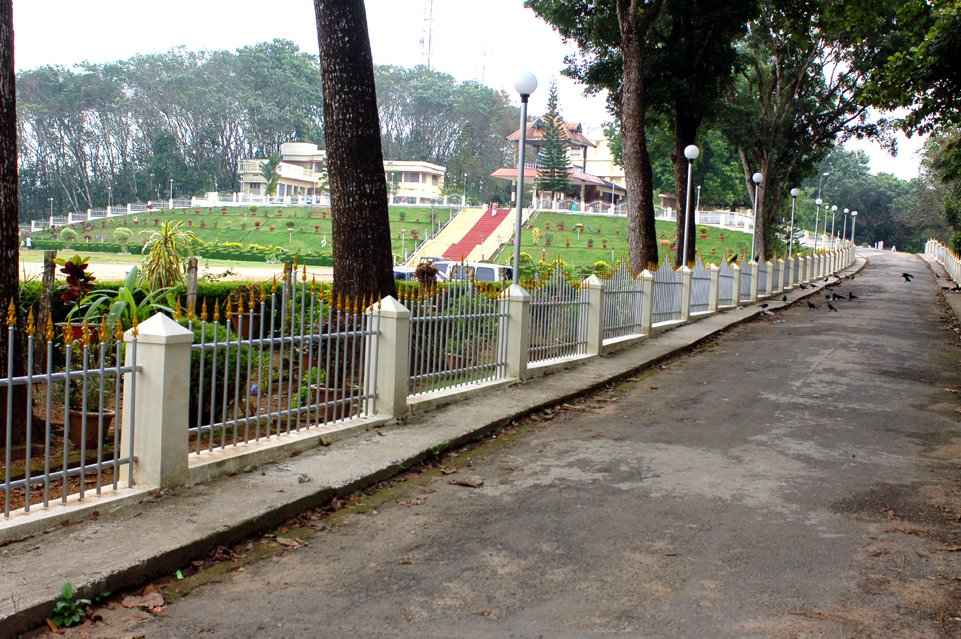
Bharananganam

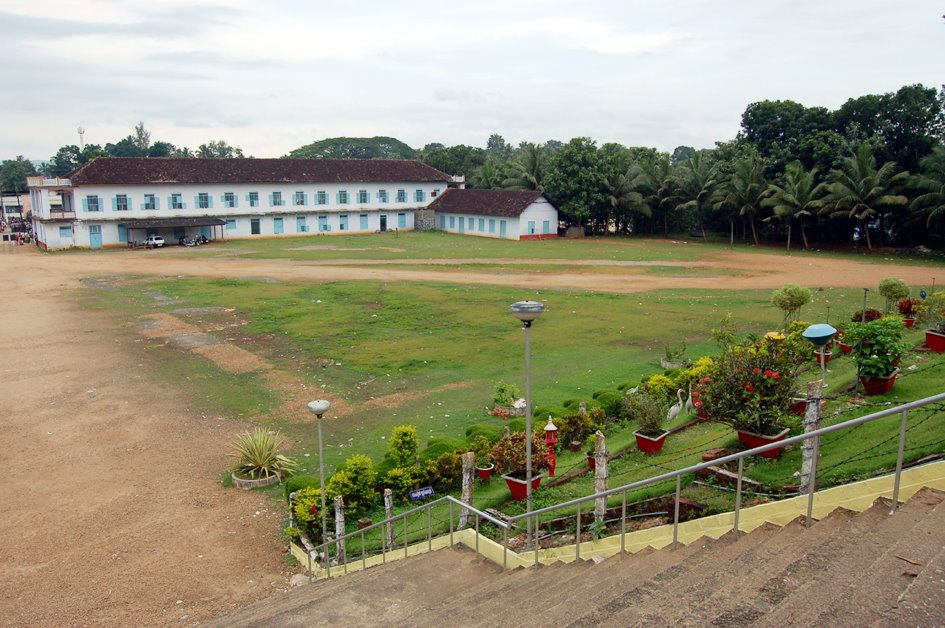
Bharanamganam School

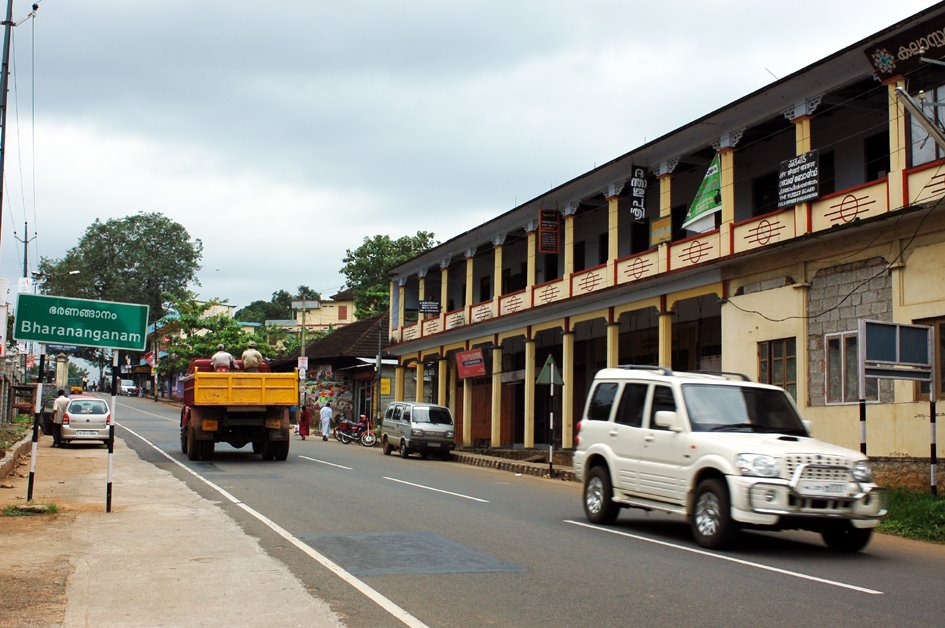
Bharananganam town

Bharananganam, is a Christian pilgrimage centre in South India on the banks of the Meenachil River, four kilometres (2.5 mi) away from Pala and four kilometres (2.5 mi) from Plassanal, in Kottayam district in the Indian state of Kerala. Agriculture is the main occupation of the people, who cultivate cash crops like rubber.

== History ==
The place was believed to be an independent territory under Travancore Kingdom immediately governed by vassal Kingdom of Poonjar. It is believed that the place had the Church of Veluthachan who is believed to be a legendary person. The church was later burnt in the 11th century and a new church was built on the opposite bank of the river Meenachil, which lead to the current church also to be named 'Anakallitt palli as an elephant laid its location due to confusion about construction of the church on the north or south bank of river Meenachil. It is also believed to be the birthplace of Kulapurath Bhima a Brahmin born in Kulapurath family of Bharananganam, who is a legendary figure who built a fort in Poonjar. sh

== Demographics ==
The population of Bharananganam comprises Catholic Syrian Christians and Nair's and Eshava's.Now Increasing Number Of Migrant labours From Nepal&Other North Indian States

== Saint Alphonsa's tomb ==
The thousand-year-old St Mary's Syro-Malabar Catholic Church is a pilgrimage centers of the St Thomas Christians in Kerala. St Alphonsa was the first woman from the Kerala Church to be canonized (declared a saint), and the second Indian after Gonsalo Garcia, a Luso-Indian born in Portuguese Bombay and Bassein.

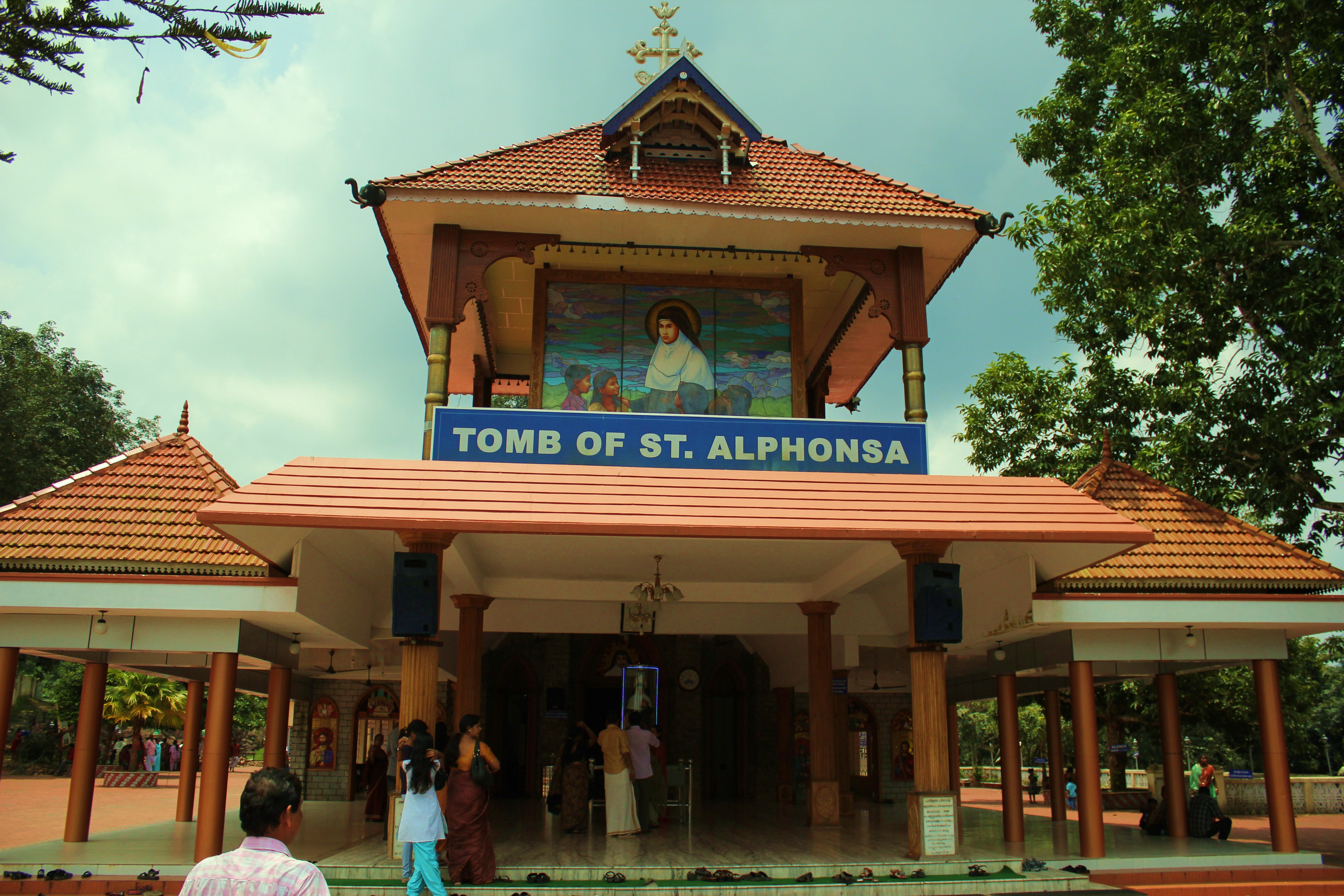
Saint Alphonsa's tomb

Alphonsa was beatified by Pope John Paul II during his visit to India in 1986. There is a two - floored structure in front of the shrine which was originally the Papal podium for the beatification ceremony on 8 February 1986.

She was canonised as Saint Alphonsa by Pope Benedict XVI at a ceremony at St. Peter's Square, Vatican City on 12 October 2008. There is a museum adjacent to the convent chapel, where her personal belongings are preserved.

== Sri Krishna Swamy Temple ==
This temple managed by N.S.S and admired for its architectural beauty. It is situated in the outskirts of Bharananganam.
