= Kadanad =

Kadanad Malayalam: കടനാട്, romanized: Kaḍanāḍŭ
- Panchayath
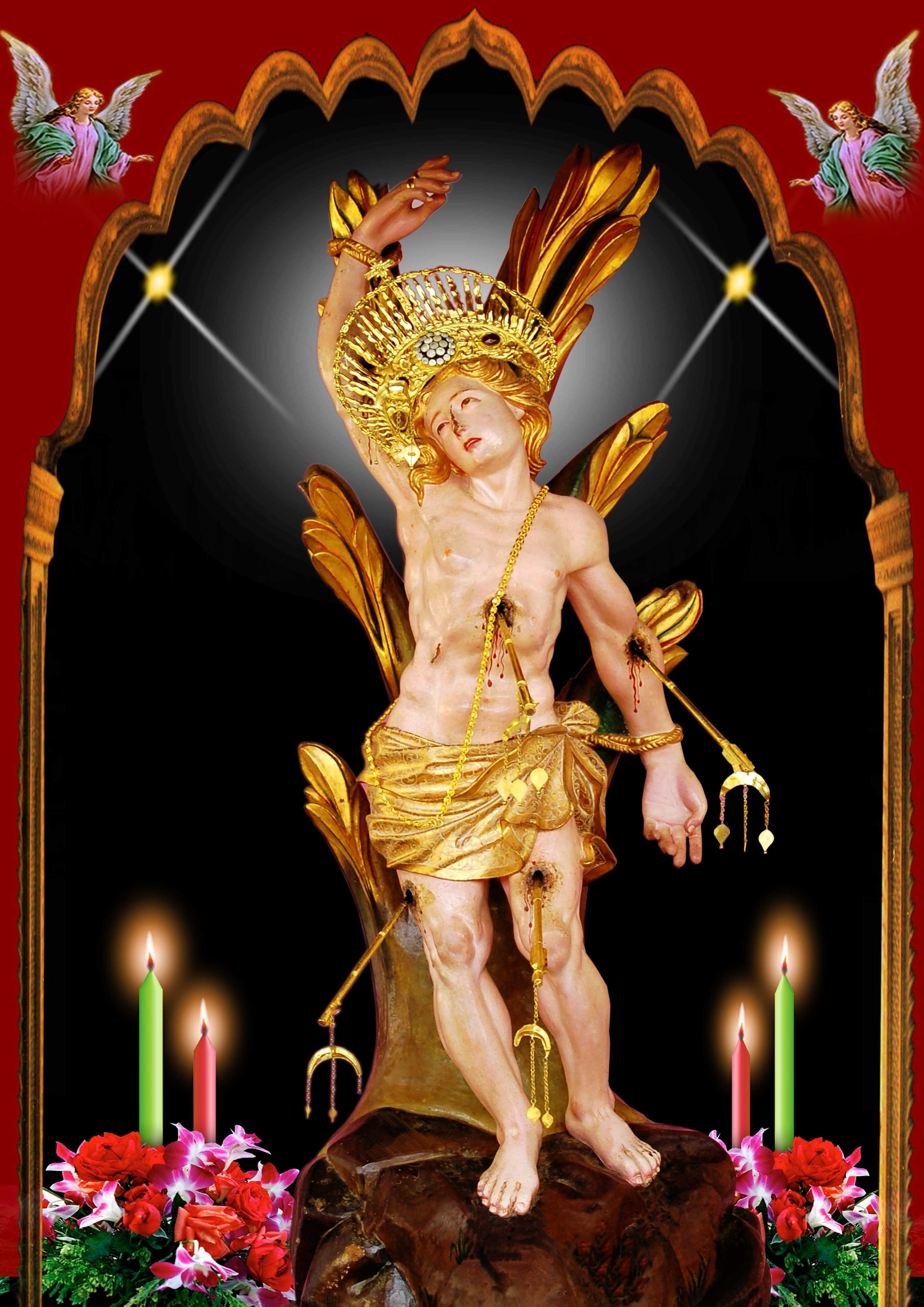
- Interactive map of Kadanad
- Coordinates: 9°46′0″N 76°42′0″E
- Country: India
- State: Kerala
- District: Kottayam

Government
  - Type: Panchayath

Population (2001)
  - Total: 14,787

Languages
  - Official: Malayalam, English
- Time zone: UTC+5:30 (IST)
- Vehicle registration: KL-

Kadanad (Malayalam: കടനാട്, romanized: Kaḍanāḍŭ) is a Panchayat and village in Meenachil, in the Kottayam district in Kerala, India. It is situated to the north of Pala.

The Panchayat belongs to Lalam Block, and Meenachil Taluk in Kottayam District.

== Educational institutions ==
St. Sebastian's Higher Secondary School is the main educational institution in Kadanad, which teaches students from 5th grade through to 12th. The primary school named St. Mathew's LP School, as well as a preschool, are also present in the village.

== Other details ==
Kadanad Post Office code is 686653; telephone code is 04822; Vehicle Registration is KL 35 (Pala).

== Demographics ==
As of 2011 India census, Kadanad had a population of 14,692 with 7,312 males and 7,380 females. The literacy rate for men was 97.62%; female was 96.37%.

== Geography ==
The area consists of mountains and valleys. It's unique geographical position is perfect for the cultivation of coffee, rubber and pepper.

The Kadanad River is the town's main water source, flowing directly through it. It rises from the Melukavu Hills and joins up with the Ezhachery River, then flows onward as Pala Meenachil River. The nearby Valikulam, only 1 kilometre (0.62 mi) away, has a chapel of St. Mary.

== Culture ==
Prime attractions are St. Augustine's Forane Church, the Perumattom Sastha Temple and St. Sebastian's Higher Secondary School.

The village celebrates the festival of St. Sebastian every year on January 15 and 16.

Kadanad was the birthplace of Paremmakkal Thoma Kathanar, the author of Varthamanappusthakam (1790), the first-ever travelogue in an Indian language.

== Transportation ==
Kadanad is on the way to Thodupuzha and can be easily approached from Pala. By road, the town is connected with Ramapuram, Uzhavoor, Meenachil and Erattupetta. The nearest major train station is Kottayam Railway Station.
