= Pinnakkanadu =

- village
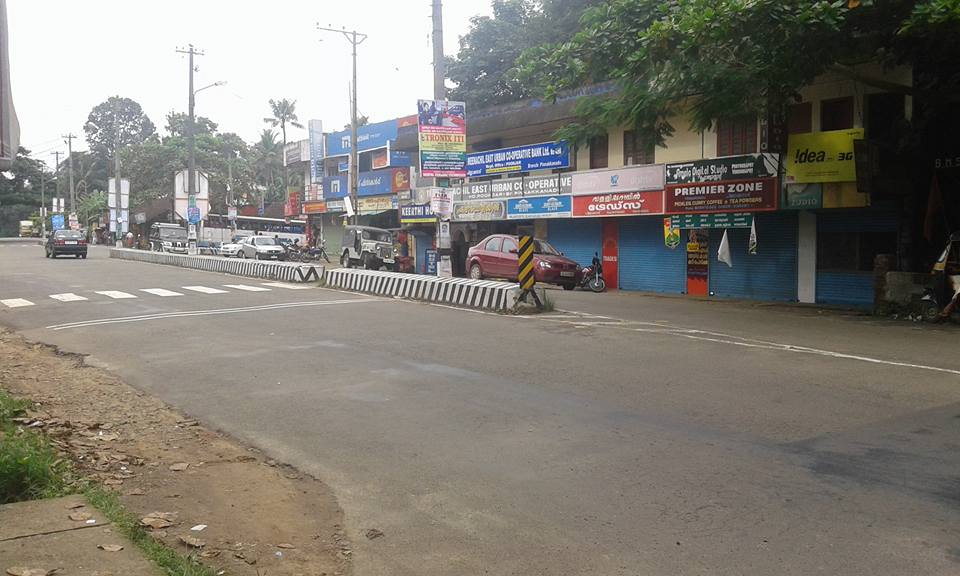
- View of Pinnakkanadu from Kanjirappally
- Interactive map of Pinnakkanadu
- Coordinates: 9°37′41.8″N 76°46′31.4″E
- Country: India
- State: Kerala
- District: Kottayam

Government
  - Type: Local Body
  - Body: Thidanadu Panchayath

Languages
  - Malayalam: Malayalam, English
- Time zone: UTC+5:30 (IST)
- Telephone code: 4828
- Vehicle registration: KL-34 & KL-35
- Nearest city: Kanjirappally, Erattupetta, Paika
- Climate: Tropical monsoon (Köppen)
- Avg. summer temperature: 35 °C (95 °F)
- Avg. winter temperature: 18 °C (64 °F)
- Website: www.facebook.com/pinnakkanad

Pinnakkanadu is a town located about 40 km East of Kottayam on Kanjirappally-Erattupetta Road, in Kottayam district of Kerala, India. It is 8 km North of Kanjirappally towards Erattupetta, 7 km East of Paika and 15 km West of Mundakkayam.

== Administration ==
The taluk (local government) headquarters is located at Meenachil, the village headquarters is at Kondoor, and the district headquarters is at Kottayam. This town is part of the Poonjar Legislative Assembly and the Pathanamthitta Lok Sabha constituency.

Ward Member: Bino Joseph Mulangassery

Taluk : Meenachil; Local Body Type: Panchayath; Name of Local Body: Thidanadu Grama Panchayat , Pinnakkanadu; Village : Kondoor

== Politics ==
Pinnakkanadu falls under the Poonjar Legislative Assembly constituency and the Pathanamthitta Lok Sabha constituency. It is also part of the Thidanadu Grama Panchayat.

The major political parties active in Poonjar include the Indian National Congress, Kerala Congress, Kerala Congress (Mani), Communist Party of India (Marxist), and Communist Party of India.

Notable Local Leaders

Prominent political figures from Pinnakkanadu include members of the Mulangassery family, associated with the Indian National Congress:

- Joseph Mathew (Appachan) Mulangassery: Served as panchayat member for the Pinnakkanadu ward (2000–2005). He was a long-serving president of the Thidanadu Congress Mandalam committee and held several other leadership positions within the Indian National Congress.
- Bino Joseph Mulangassery: Current panchayat member for Ward 11 Pinnakkanadu. He previously served as Vice-President of Thidanadu Grama Panchayat while representing the Kalaketty ward (2015–2020). He is the son of Joseph Mathew (Appachan) Mulangassery.
- Mini Bino Mulangassery: Wife of Bino Joseph Mulangassery. Currently, President of Thidanadu Grama Panchayat. Served as panchayat member for the Pinnakkanadu ward (2020–2025) and Vice-President of Thidanadu Grama Panchayat during that term. She is currently the panchayat member for Ward 12 Cherani.

== Economy ==
Local people mostly work as farmers, cultivating cash crops such as rubber and cocoa, and food crops such as Tapioca and plantain.

== Villages and suburbs ==
Nearby places include Kalaketty, Mailady, Chettuthodu, Malikassery, Varianikadu, Chemmalamattam.

== Transportation ==
Nearest Railway stations: Kottayam (40 km), Changanacherry (43 km) or Ettumanoor (30 km)
The nearest Airport is Cochin Airport (Nedumbasserry)- 70 km

Pinnakkanadu can be reached by road from Kanjirappally, Erattupetta, Paika and Parathodu.

== Public institutions and registered offices ==
Governmental

- Police Station Thidanadu
- Akshaya e Centre Pinnakkanadu

Banks

- Kerala State Co-operative Bank Limited
- The Meenachil East Urban Co-operative Bank
- Thidanad Service Co-operative Bank

Educational Institutions

- CMS LP School Thidanadu
