= Mallikassery =

- Village
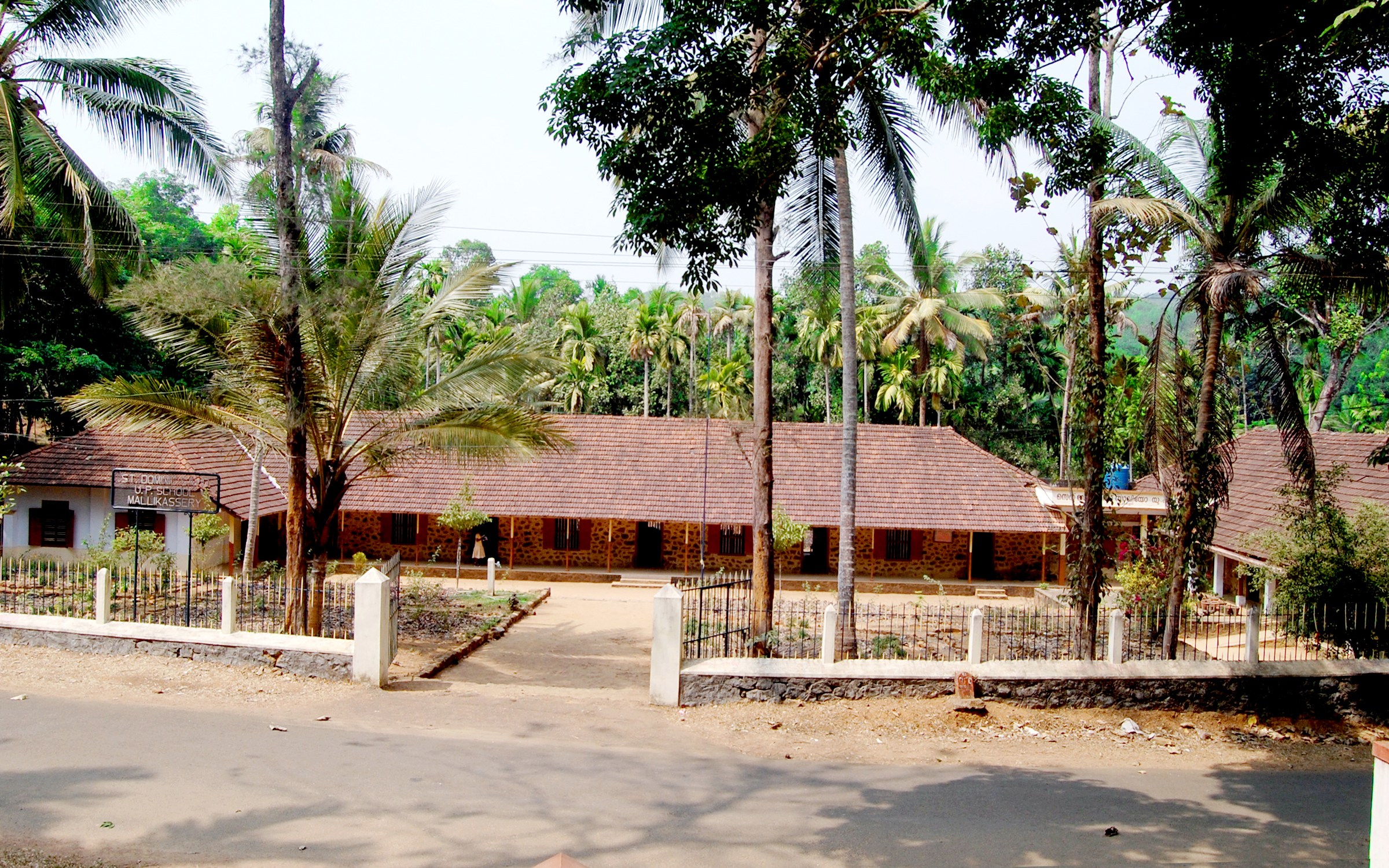
- Dominic School
- Interactive map of Mallikassery
- Coordinates: 9.6°N 76.74°E
- Country: India
- State: Kerala
- District: Kottayam

Government
  - Type: Panchayath
  - Body: Elikulam grama panchayath

Area
  - Total: 6 km^{2} (2.3 sq mi)
- Elevation: 56.7 m (186 ft)

Languages
  - Official: Malayalam, English
- Time zone: UTC+5:30 (IST)
- PIN: 686577
- Telephone code: 04822
- Vehicle registration: KL 35, KL-34
- Nearest cities: Kottayam, Palai, Erattupetta

Mallikassery is a small village near Paika, in Elikulam Panchayat of Kanjirappally Taluk in Kottayam district, in the state of Kerala, India. The village lies between Paika and Pinnakkanad, along the Paika–Pinnakkanad road.

Ponnozhukumthodu, a tributary to the river Meenachil, flows by Mallikassery.

Mallikassery is a major rubber producing region.
