= Thalanadu =

Thalanadu Thalanad
- Rural village
- Location in Kerala, India Thalanadu (India)
- Coordinates: 9°45′0″N 76°46′0″E
- Country: India
- State: Kerala
- District: Kottayam

Government
  - Type: Panchayath

Languages
  - Official: Malayalam, English
- Time zone: UTC+5:30 (IST)
- PIN: 686580
- Telephone code: 04822
- Vehicle registration: KL-35
- Nearest city: Erattupetta
- Literacy: 90%
- Lok Sabha constituency: Kottayam
- Climate: rain season (Köppen)

Thalanadu is a Southern Indian village, situated in the eastern part of Kottayam district in Kerala, between Vagamon, Moonnilavu and Teekoy

== Geography ==
Thalanadu is a typical Kerala village, which is a mixture of the features of both midland countryside and the Malanad hill area, enveloped in greenery with a clean and unpolluted atmosphere. It is a small panchayat in Poonjar Vadakkekara Village, but quite long, stretching about 25 kilometres including Adukkom reaching up to the Vagamon and Munnilavu Panjayahthu area, at about three thousand and five hundred feet above sea level. This place is known for its agriculture and landscape.

== People ==
Large scale settlement in Thalanadu began more than 85 to 90 years ago. It resembles a tropical rain-forest area with a diverse population of trees—including teak and jackfruit— typically found in the Western Ghats region and a profuse number of crops such as coconut, latex rubber and arecanut. Due to its fertile lands, most Thalanadu residents are farmers and spice or rubber cultivators. A considerable variety of medicinal plants also grow here, many of which are used in making traditional home remedies. Spiritually, most of the population are Christian, Muslim or Hindu. The literacy rate in this village is above 90% with categorically "very less" unemployment recorded. There is a voluntary job training institute named TIES established in 90's, an example of the population's dedication towards the development of the village. This institute provided free training for thousands of young people there to get a job in the Government public sector.

== Culture ==
Thalanadu is a rural village with a hilly touch. It has a dominant rural culture, People join together for celebrating the annual festivals, rituals and feasts in church and temples etc. Women are not just housewives. They too join public life especially after the restructured Panchayati raj system was introduced. There is only a moderate level of political activity, hence hardly any social divisions over politics. There are three Temples, one church and two Mosques in this place.

== Climate ==
Thalanadu climate has a heavy rainy season and mild summer. Summer rains are not infrequent. With hills in the backdrop it never gets very hot, and the climate tends towards windy and cool. This weather makes the soil good for all crops.

== Tourism ==
Thalanadu is naturally perched by its location in one of the busiest tourist circuits in Kerala.Ayyampara has a huge rock formation whose top is a flat expanse running into hundreds of acres. It is a place with many cliffs, a cave and panoramic views. People also visit this place in the evening to enjoy the cool breeze and see the sun set. Ayyampara is one of the main tourist destination in this place with big rock mountain three thousand and five hundred feet from the Sea level. Its more than 10 acres (0.040 km^{2}) of rocks with temple and church on the top of it, getting more attention from tourists. Many tourists come to experience the beauty of raining and Greenishness on the way to vagamon. Both the river and the flat land are flanked by hills. Plantations such as Rubber and other cultivations showing the developments of this area. The origin of meenachil river is starts from here.

== Notable people ==
- Jeo Baby
