= Kattikkayam Waterfalls =

Waterfalls in Kerala, India

Coordinates: 9°46′31″N 76°48′33″E

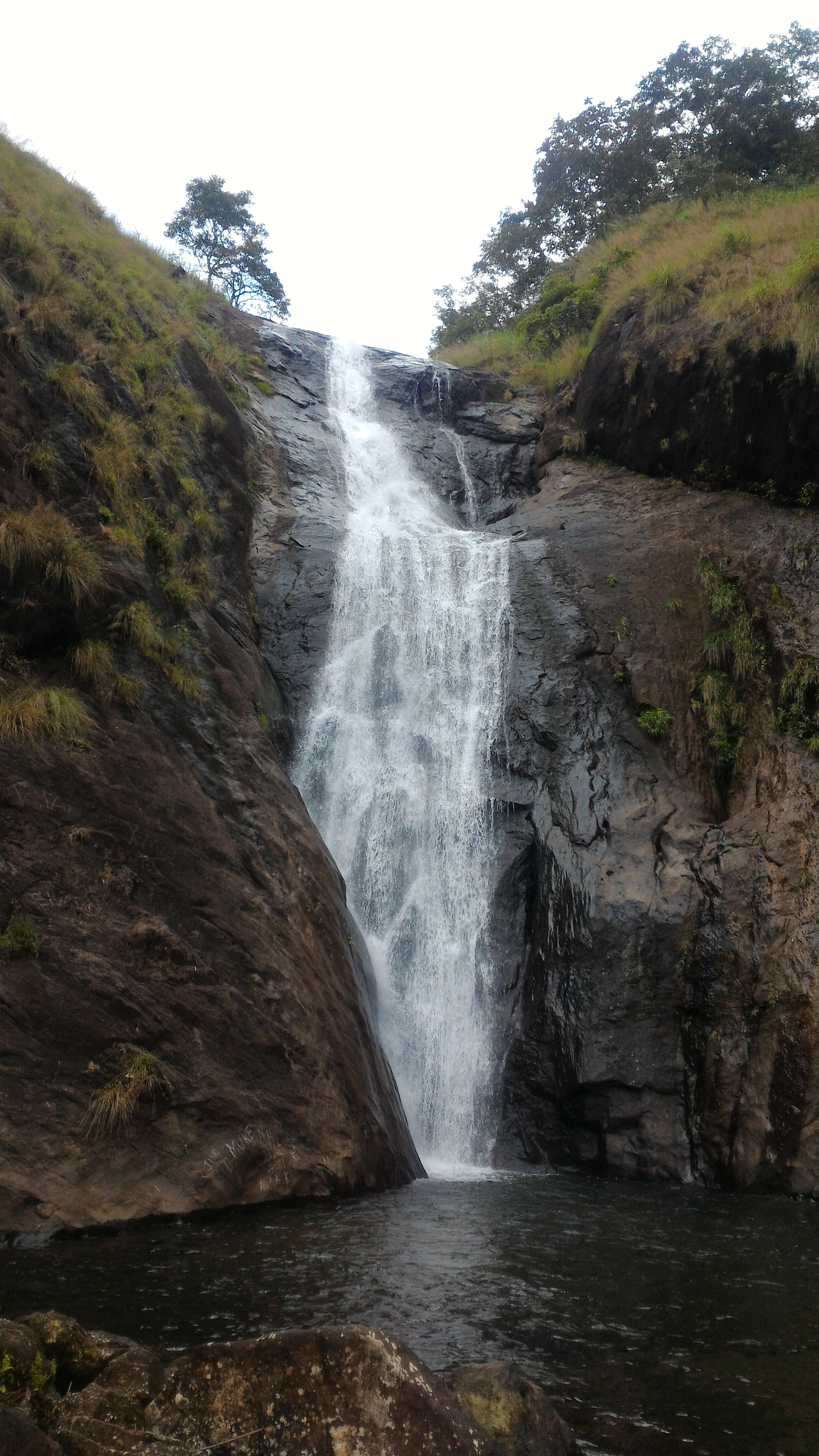
- Interactive map of Kattikkayam Waterfalls
- Location: Kottayam district, Kerala, India
- Total height: 50 ft (15 m)

Kattikkayam Falls is located in the Kottayam district, Kerala, India. It can be reached from Purukkakanam by way of Erratupetta to Illikakkal Kallu via Moonnilavu. The lake under the waterfall is the main attraction at Kattikkayam. It is considered one of the most unsafe waterfalls in Kerala due to the gaps in the rock under the lake can cause danger.
