= St. Joseph's College of Engineering and Technology, Palai =

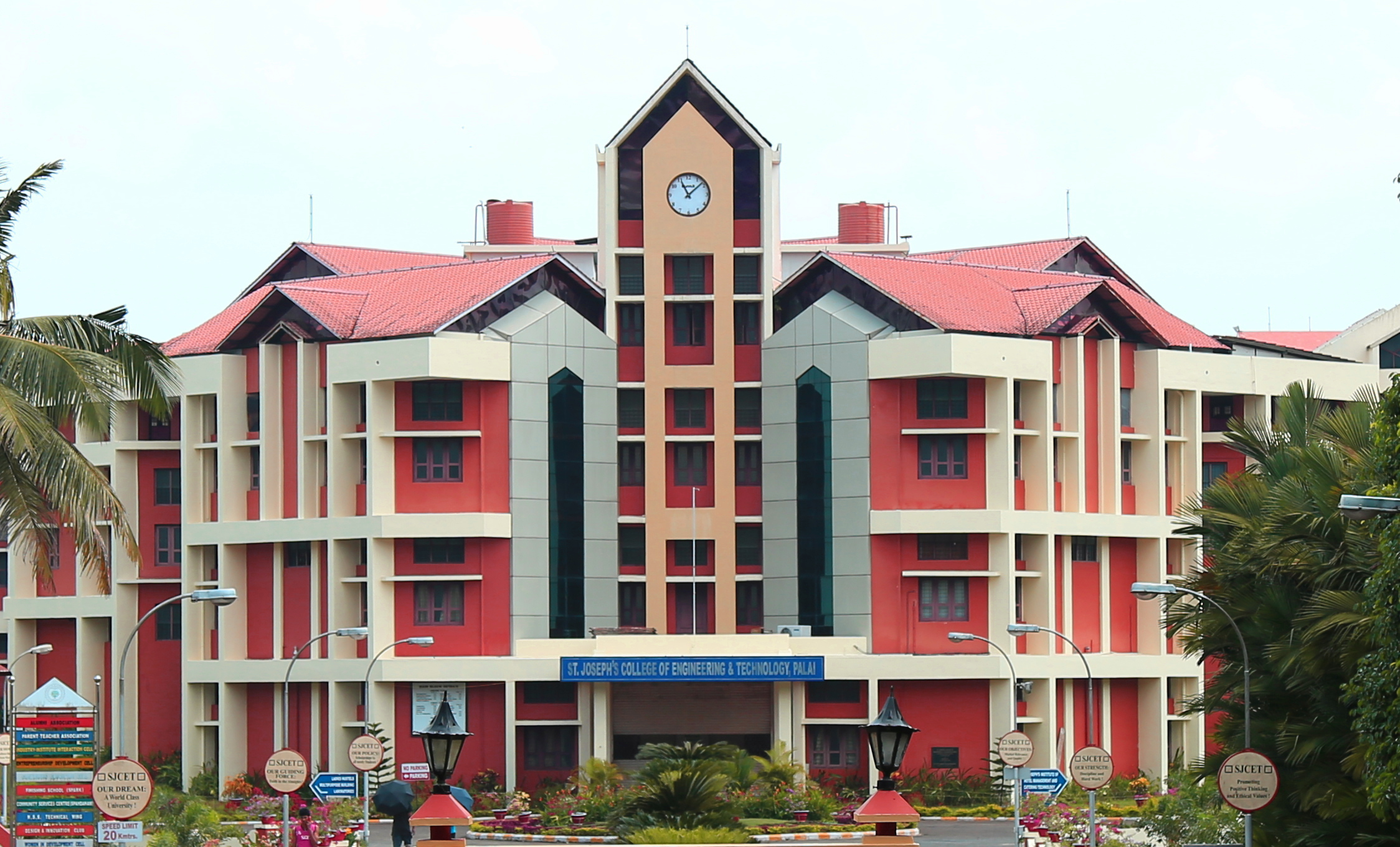
- Motto: A College With A Difference
- Type: Private, Catholic Diocese of Pala
- Established: 2002
- Accreditation: NAAC 'A' Graded with autonomous status, NBA Accredited: CSE & Civil (2025), EEE & MCA (2026/2027), ECE & ME (2025).
- Affiliations: Dr. A P J Abdul Kalam Technological University, MG University Kottayam
- Chairman: Fr. Thadathil Joseph
- Principal: Dr. V. P. Devassia
- Director: Dr. James John Mangalathu
- Academic staff: 212
- Students: 1925
- Postgraduates: 225
- Doctoral students: 15
- Location: Pala, Kerala, 686579, India; 9.7268°N 76.7260°E
- Campus: Rural, 46.55 acres (18.84 ha)
- Language: English, Hindi, Malayalam
- Website: www.sjcetpalai.ac.in

St. Joseph's College of Engineering and Technology (Autonomous), Palai (SJCET Palai) is a private engineering college located in Pala, Kerala, India. Managed by the Syro-Malabar Catholic Diocese of Palai, initially the college was affiliated with Mahatma Gandhi University, Kottayam, and now with A. P. J. Abdul Kalam Technological University. It is approved by the All India Council for Technical Education (AICTE) and offers professional degree programs in engineering and management.

SJCET Palai has received accreditation from the National Board of Accreditation (NBA). In 2012, the NBA accredited four of its undergraduate engineering programs—Electronics and Instrumentation Engineering, Computer Science and Engineering, Electronics and Communication Engineering, and Mechanical Engineering—for a period of three years. In 2019, the NBA re-accredited the Electronics and Communication Engineering and Mechanical Engineering programs, with the accreditation valid until June 30, 2022. Recently, the college received accreditation for its MCA and Electrical and Electronics Engineering programs. The college has been awarded an 'A' grade by NAAC and attained autonomous status in July 2024.

The institution, initially certified under ISO 9001:2008, conducts regular internal and external audits to maintain quality standards. It also holds ISO 9001:2015 and ISO 14001:2015 certifications.

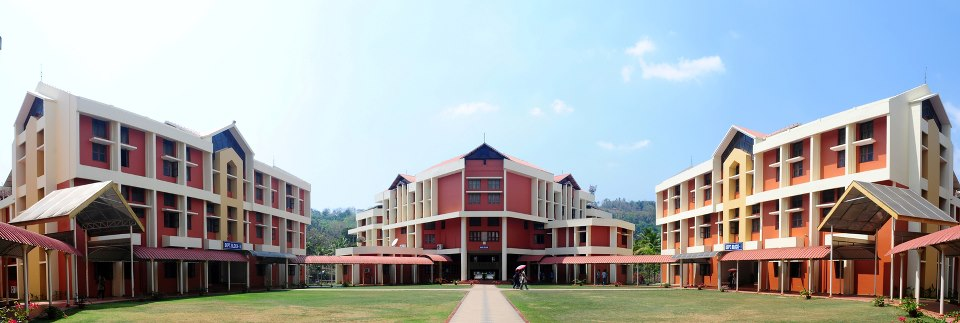
A different view of each department blocks in SJCET Campus

== History ==
St. Joseph's College of Engineering and Technology was established in 2002 by the Diocesan Technical Education Trust of the Catholic Diocese of Palai. It was conferred with the status of the minority community institution by the Government of India in 2008.

== Courses Offered ==
St. Joseph's College of Engineering and Technology, Palai offers the following programs:

=== UG Programs ===
- B.Tech in Artificial Intelligence and Data Science
- B.Tech in Civil Engineering
- B.Tech in Computer Science and Engineering
- B.Tech in Computer Science and Engineering (Cybersecurity)
- Computer Science and Engineering (Artificial Intelligence)
- B.Tech in Electrical and Electronics Engineering
- B.Tech in Electronics and Communications Engineering
- B.Tech in Electronics and Computer Engineering
- B.Tech in Mechanical Engineering

=== PG Programs ===
- M.Tech. in Advanced Manufacturing & Production Management
- M.Tech. in VLSI & Embedded Systems
- M.Tech. in Computer Science and Engineering
- M.Tech. in Advanced Communication & Information Systems
- M.Tech. in Structural Engineering & Construction Management
- Master of Business Administration
- Master of Computer Applications
- Integrated - Master of Computer Applications

== International Conference SINGULARIS ==
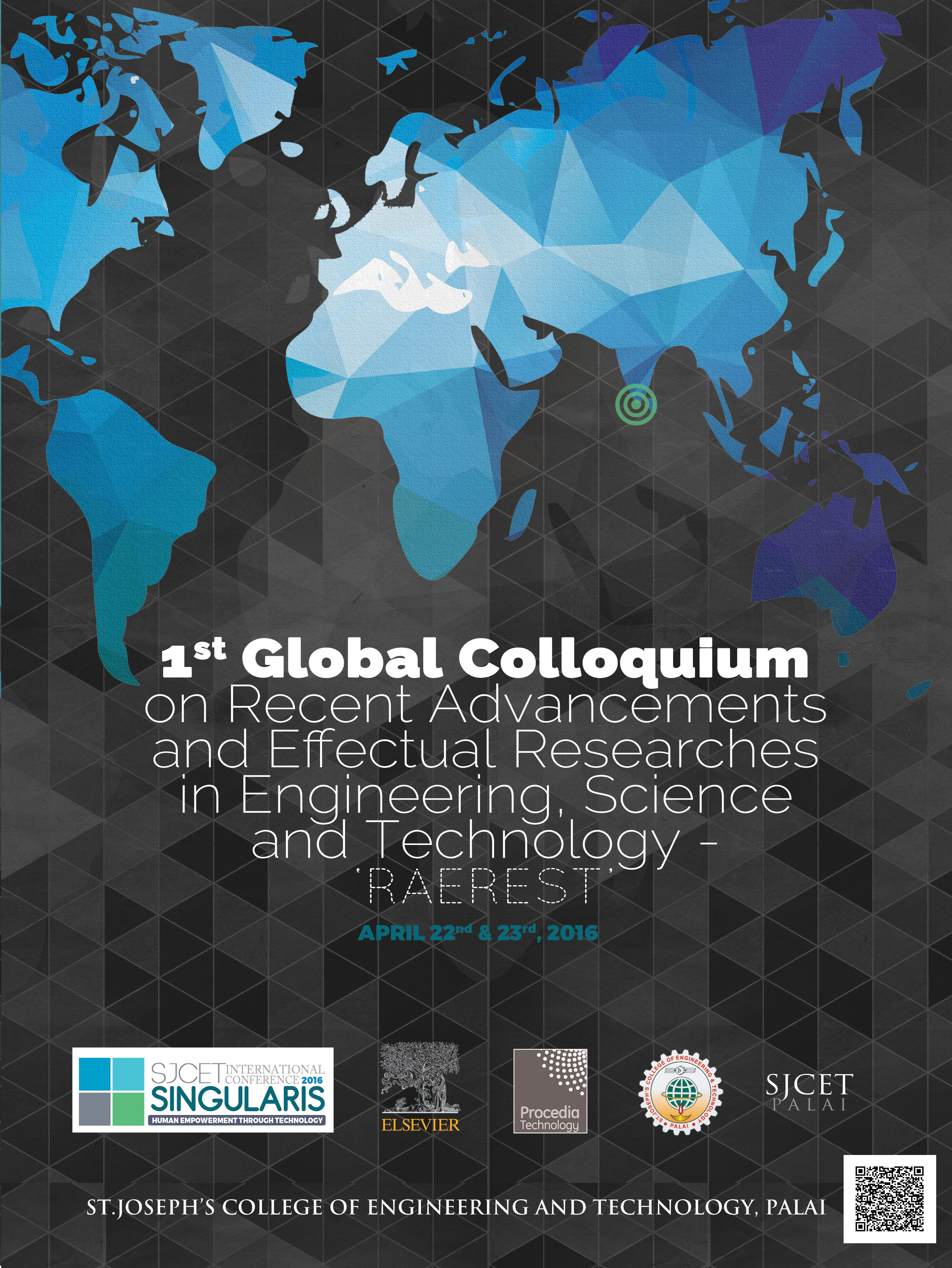
Recent Advancement and Effectual Researches in Engineering Science and Technology (RAEREST)

The international Conference on Global Colloquium in Recent Advancement and Effectual Researches in Engineering Science and Technology (RAEREST) focus on providing an international opportunity for sharing the ideas, knowledge and information of eminent and experienced professionals from industries, research organisations, faculty, research scholars and students from academic institutions among experts and researchers working in their area of interest.

Reviewed and accepted papers will be published as one dedicated issue in Elsevier's Procedia Technology Journal (ISSN 2212-0173) and made available in open-access on Elsevier's Science Direct, which is used by millions of researchers and professionals on a monthly basis guaranteeing maximum visibility of the research paper.

The theme of the conference is Human Empowerment through Technology. The program of the conference constitutes plenary lectures, keynote lectures and invited talks from eminent scientists, technologists, industry professionals working in the area of Mechanical, Civil, Computer Science, Electrical engineering, Electronics Engineering, Applied Electronics Engineering and related applications

== Research and development activities ==
- SJCET has received a financial grant of Rs 2.80 Lakh from NMICET MHRD Govt. of India to set up HD Audio Video streaming Conference through R & D centre of CSE Department. Mr. Deepu Job is the faculty in charge of the R & D centre.
- CSE department has initiated a portable NAS storage solution for moving 10 TB of data from IIT Madras to SJCET Campus.
- Low-cost incubator: A low-cost incubator is developed and is under test as per requirement of a local resident under the guidance of Mr. Mohit John and supervision of Mr. Jomy Joseph of Applied Electronics & Instrumentation Department
- Bus scheduling system: Inspired from district collectors SMART Kottayam initiative, a smart bus schedule system is developed in-house and installed in KSRTC bus terminals of Palai & Erattupetta under the guidance of Mr. Mohit John and supervision of Mrs. Jomy Joseph, Sreekumar K. T. & Justin Tom of Applied Electronics & Instrumentation Department. The smart bus schedule system is also installed at Thiruvalla bus terminal.

== SJCET Journal of Engineering and Management ==
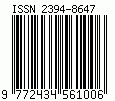
SJCET Journal of Engineering and Management EAN13 9772434561006

SJCET Journal of Engineering and Management is a technical national journal published half yearly by St. Joseph's College of Engineering and Technology, Pala.

== Exposities ==
Cynosure is the quadrennial technical exposition organised by St. Joseph's College of Engineering and Technology, Pala, in its endeavor for social outreach to the local and mofussil residents. The programmes and themes of Cynosure are focused on youth empowerment and inculcation of scientific temper among them. Cynosure 2015 was held during the three days from 17 to 19 September 2015.

== Infrastructure ==
SJCET is a residential campus having residential facilities for both students and faculty. Facilities include canteen, cafeteria, book store, gymnasium, bank (South Indian Bank) and medical care centre.

=== Library & Information Division ===
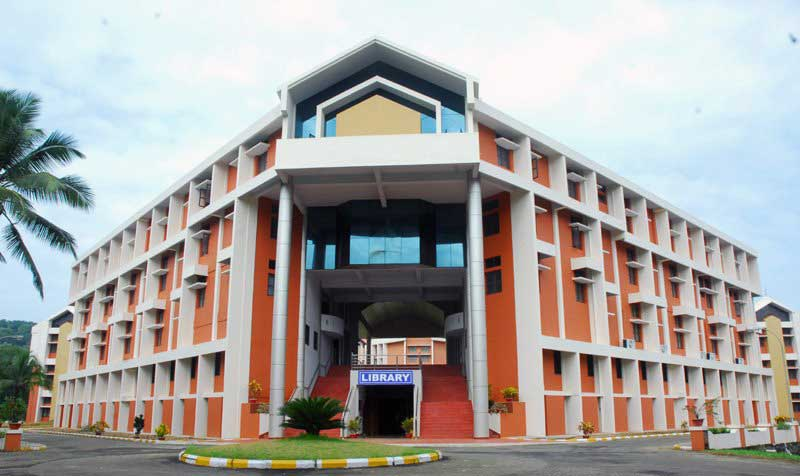
Central College Library

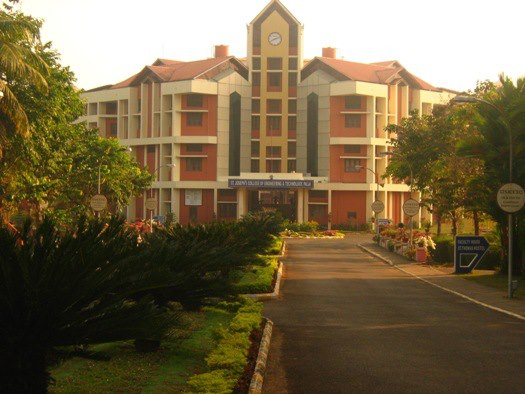
College's Main Block comprising administrative section and office. A seen from college front gate.

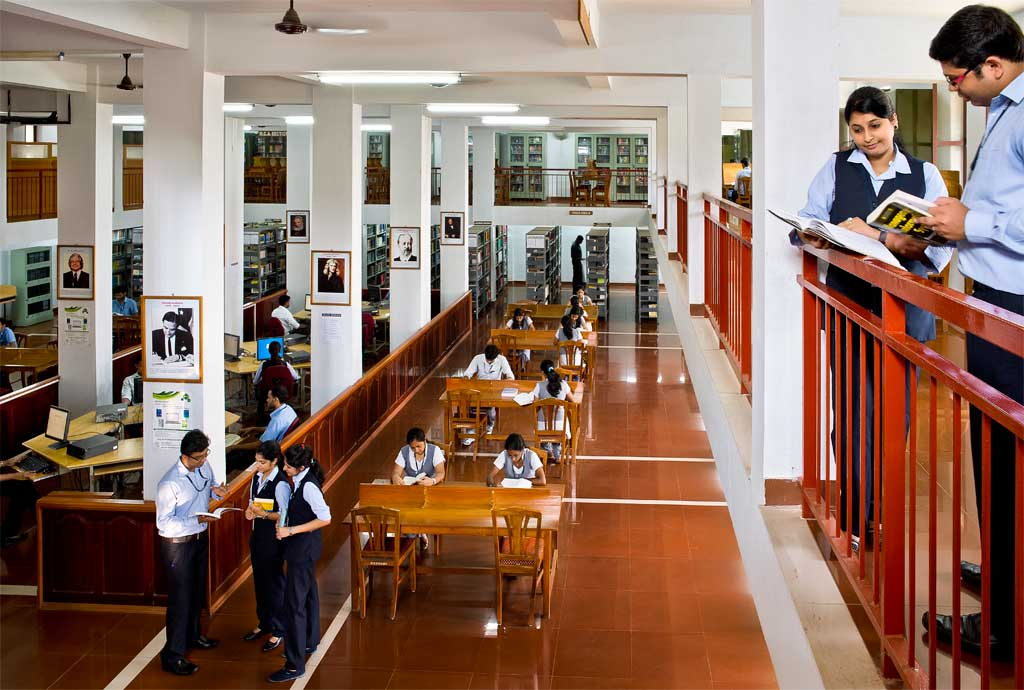
A seen inside the Central Library

Library members can access materials (such as Books, Journals, Magazines, Digital material etc.) available in the library collection. The Library reading space can accommodate nearly 200 members. The SJCET Library is fully computerised with smart ID cards and bar-code technologies. All the Library functions such as Acquisition, Circulation, Cataloguing and Serial control have been automated using integrated software.

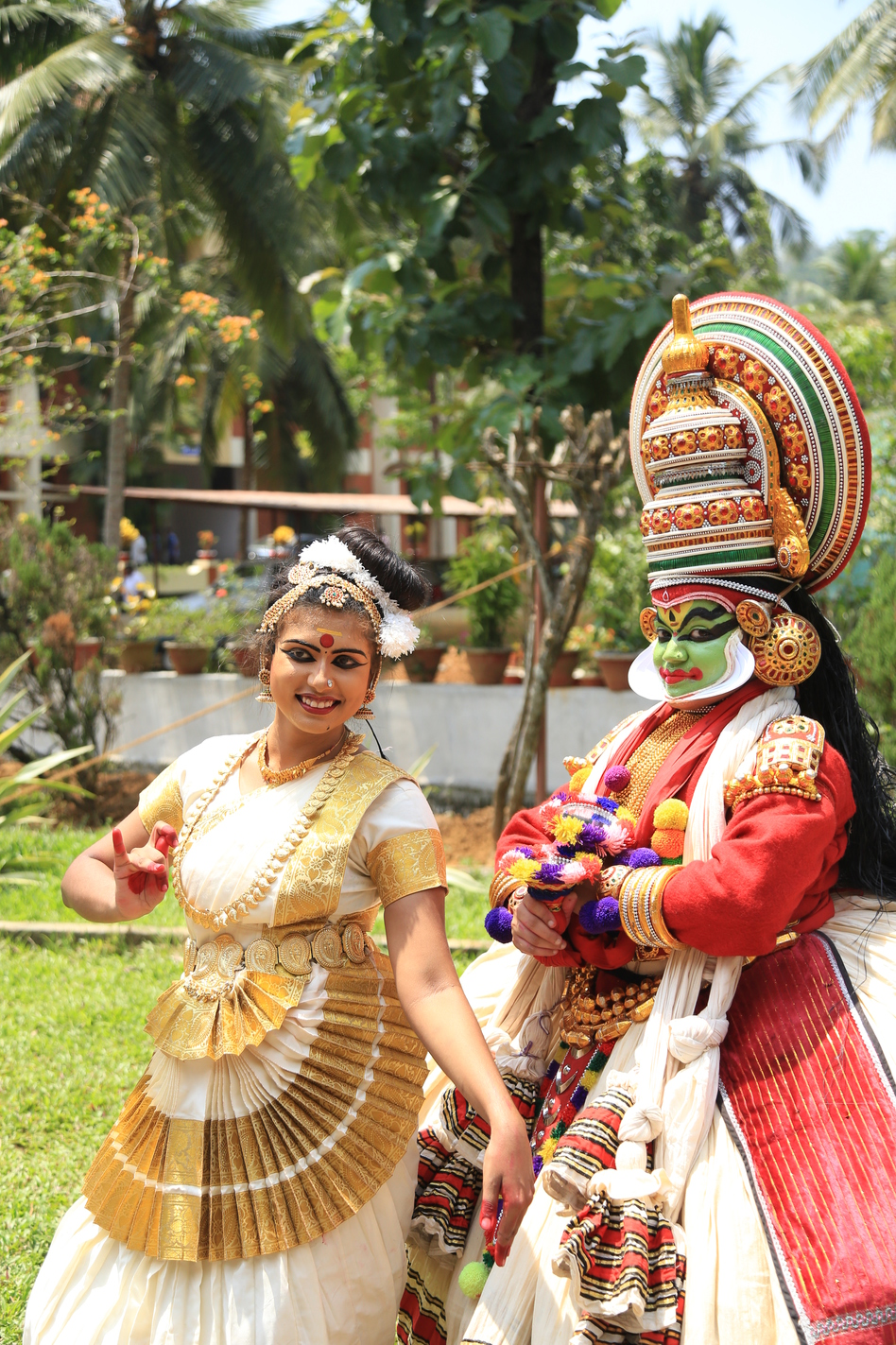
Bharatanatyam and kathakali performer in sargam SJCET's annual Arts Fest

=== Auditorium ===
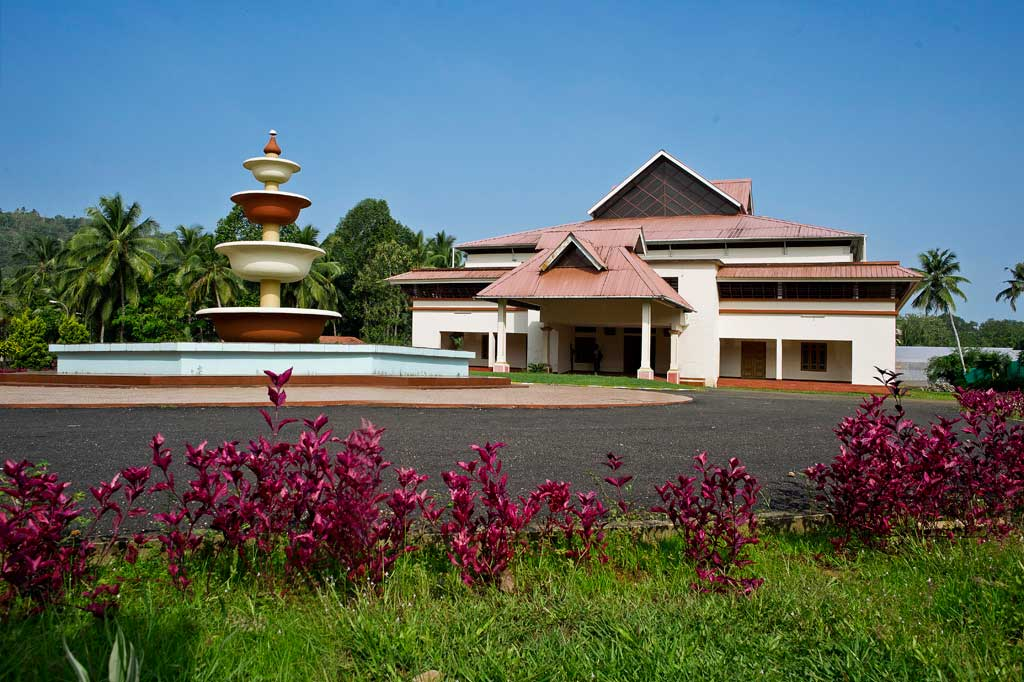
Multipurpose Auditorium situated near New Department Block 4

An auditorium cum multipurpose building with a seating capacity of more than a thousand people was inaugurated in February 2006. The two-storied building, with balcony seating facility can accommodate 1260 people and is the longest college auditorium in Kerala. Apart from hosting all college functions it is used for conducting yoga and meditation sessions, cultural festivals, placement tests, college exams, etc.

=== Gymnasium ===
Gymnasium facilities are available for students in the campus. For making use of this facility, students have to join the gymnasium club. Gymnasium facilities are available for ladies students and staffs at St.Mary's Hostels also.

=== Student hostels ===
The students are provided accommodation within the campus itself. The hostels in the campus are:

- St. Thomas Hostel (for men)
- St. Alphonsa Hostel (for men)
- St. Augustine's Hostel (for women)
- St. Mary's Hostel (for men)

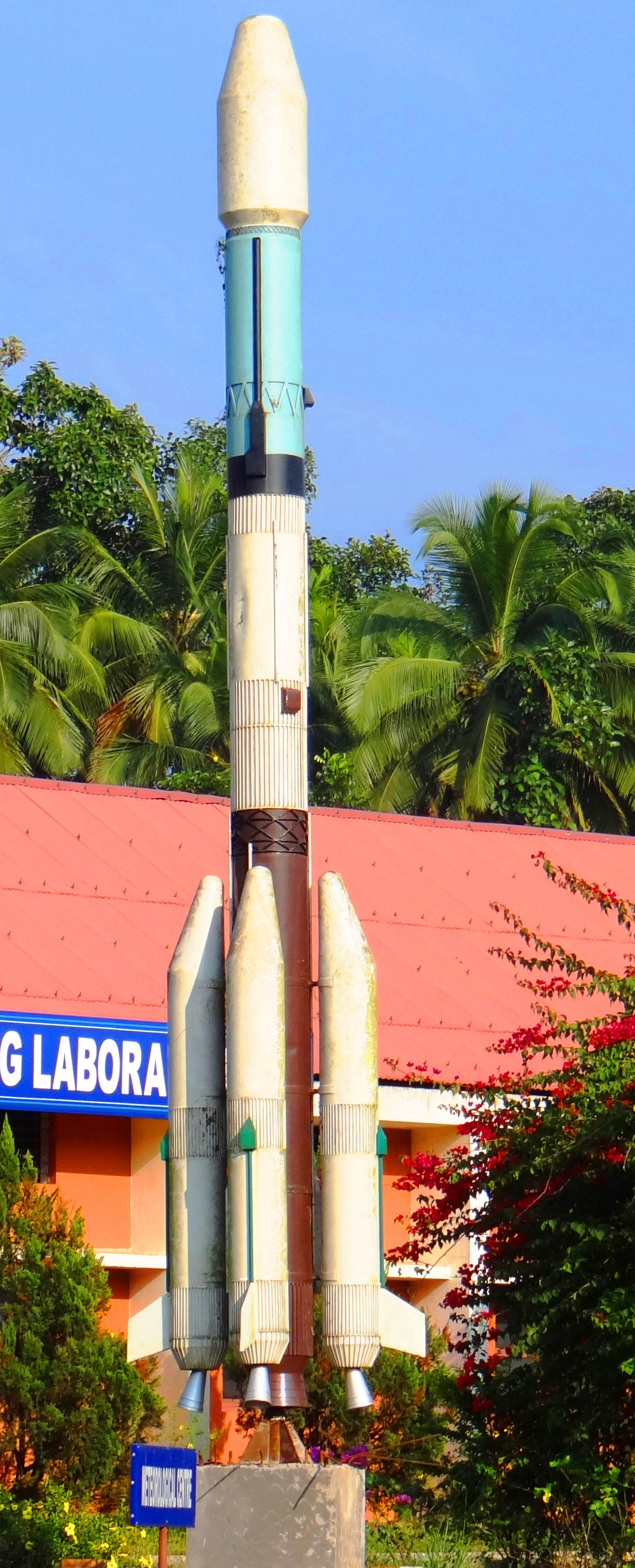
GSLV model situated in the college campus in front of Multipurpose building and near to new Department Block 4.

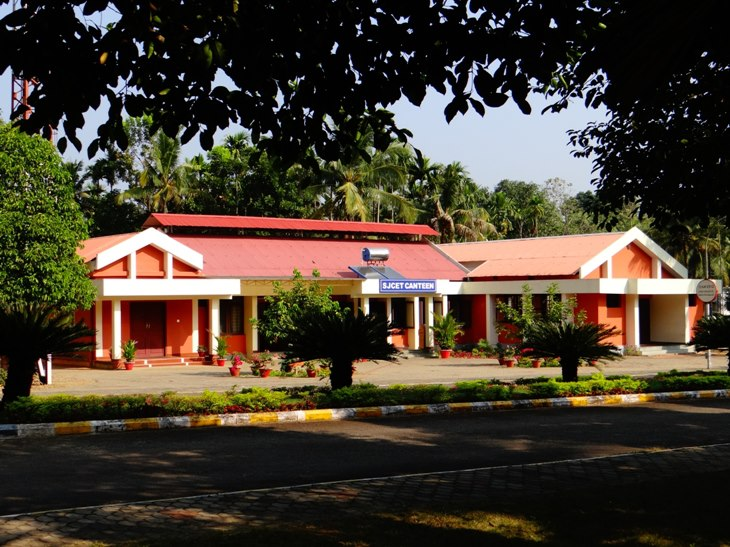
Main Canteen situated at the front gate of college campus near to main block.

=== Faculty houses ===
A faculty house is available in the campus for male faculty members. A separate wing in the Ladies Hostel is available for lady faculty members.

== Student societies ==
=== Spandanam ===
Spandanam is a charity organization in SJCET that works with the aim to improve the community we live in. The organisation regularly conducts visits to old-age homes, jails, orphanages and community health centers. Spandanam co-ordinates many charity related activities within SJCET, the uniform collection drive being the most notable of them all, this encourages the students to donate their old uniforms to those less fortunate.

=== IEEE student branch ===
The Institute of Electrical and Electronics Engineers (IEEE) is a global organisation to support the creation, development, sharing and application of knowledge about technology and science for the benefit of students. The IEEE student Branch of SJCET was inaugurated on 2 March 2005 by Mr. S Gopakumar, head Computer Session VSSC & IEEE students activity chair Kerala Section. He delivered an awareness session on IEEE and its activities. We are proud to have Mr. C Brajesh, project manager NEST as the branch mentor. He is acting as a mediator between the college and industries. The total strength of IEEE student branch was 32 students with Mr. Binu P John as the branch counselor. The branch has conducted many activities like personality development invited talks national-level technical symposium and as well as a project exhibition. The student branch secured the award for the largest student branch in Kerala Section for the year 2011 under the leadership of branch counselor Mr.G Sabarinath. The present branch counselor is Mr.Anoop B.N of the Electronics and Communications Department.

- In connection with IEEE Day celebrations on 6 October, an SB level Quiz contest was conducted. The quiz was held exclusively for the IEEE Members of the college. Hridhya Bibi of S4 EEE, Libin Tomy of S4 ME were the toppers and they qualified for the finals held at GEC Trichur.
- The IEEE P.E.S. Kerala Chapter organized a State Level Quiz Competition for the first year engineering college thstudents of the state. The final was held at SJCET on 9 October 2015. As a part of the World IEEE day and Tenth anniversary Celebration of the IEEE student's branch of SJCET, IEEE SB of SJCET organized its annual mega event Tesseract 2.0 on 10 October 2015.
- The event consisted of various workshops including Catia v5, Raspberry Pi, and Wordpress and technical talks. All classes were handled by experts and professionals. Students from various colleges participated in the events.

IEEE SB of SJCET conducted a project exhibition competition as the part of Cynosure 2k15. Innovative ideas and projects with working models were displayed at the event. Some of the prize winning projects were: Efficient All-Terrain Vehicle (ATV), Smartphone controlled Car, EWaste Bin, Mobile application for Civil Engineers and students etc. In the junior section, the prize winning projects were: Regenerative braking system and Robotic arm. IEEE stall had various exhibits like 3D Printer, Home Automation System, Virtual Reality Headsets, Google Cardboard, Object detection robots etc.

=== CSI student chapter ===
A CSI chapter is functioning in the college as a professional society for computer science students exclusively.

=== ISTE student chapter ===
Since the formation of the ISTE student chapter in July 2003, the chapter has been organizing many activities under the ISTE banner for the benefit of the members. The ISTE students' chapter of SJCET, Palai was inaugurated by Dr. D. Balakrishnan (chairman, ISTE Kerala section) in 2004.

== Transportation ==
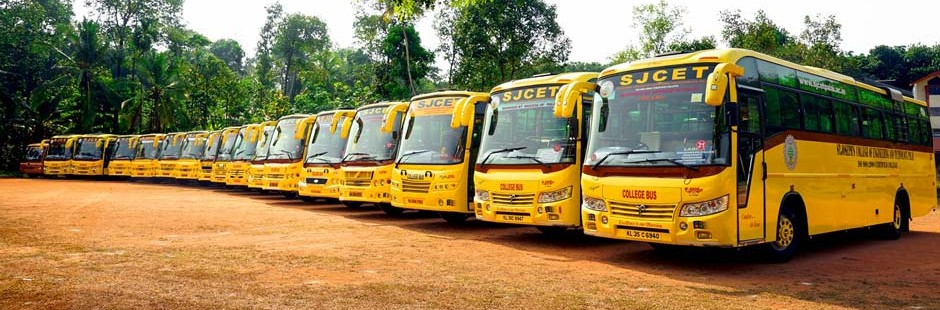
SJCET PALA College Buses in the college ground.

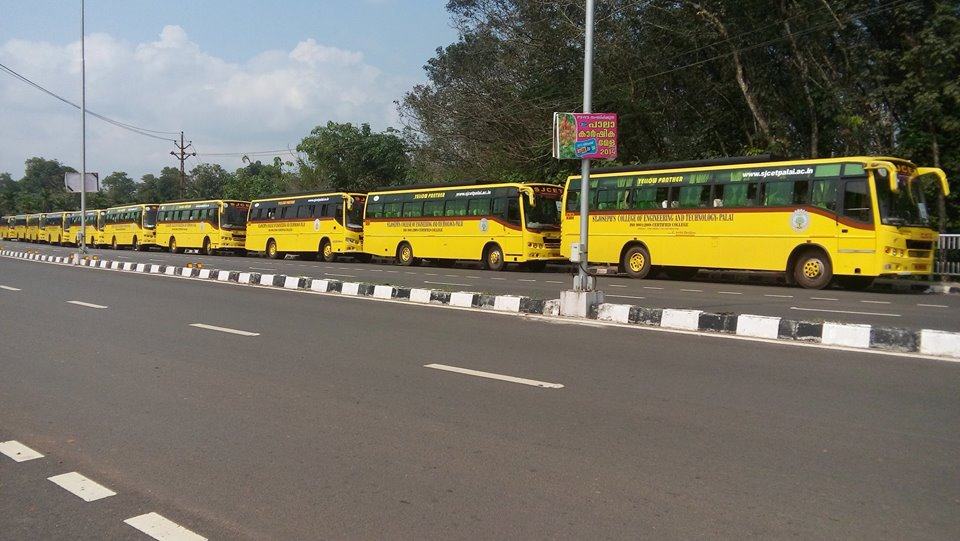
College Buses in line at Outer Ring Road at Pala Town

The college has 24 buses, one van and one car for the use of students and staff.

Buses connects from the college through Bharananganam, Erattupetta, Poonjar, Edamattom, Paika, Pinnakanad, Thidanad, Poovathode, Pala, Ettumanoor, Kuraavilangad, Kuruppanthara, Kaduthuruthy, Muttuchira, Ramapuram, Koothattukulam, Thodupuzha, Pravithanam

== Notable achievements ==
- Mr. Nithin Babu of third year Mechanical Engineering handled a session on Entrepreneurship development for the Boot Camp at SJCET and participated in YES I CAN meet organised by Government of Kerala for promoting entrepreneurship on 12 September 2015.
- Second year Mechanical Engineering students took part in IEEE camp held at Vimal Jyothi College of Engineering, Kannur and College of Engineering, Trivandrum.
- Nine Second year Mechanical Engineering students registered a company titled Infusory Designs in Startup Village. Akash Joseph and Thomson Tom were the student volunteers for Teenovators 2k15 organised by Manipal University in October, 2015.
- Projects of Jebin Joseph and Thomson Tom, Mechanical Engineering students were selected for the final round of the innovative project contest SMART organised by the District Administration.
- Thomson Tom and Akash Joseph, Second year Mechanical Engineering students were the finalists of BPlan Competition held at NIT, Calicut from 27 to 29 November 2015. Mr. Thomson Tom was qualified into the finals of paper presentation contest and Circuit Maze.
- Mr. Thomson Tom of Second year Mechanical Engineering attended a conference on Free and Open Source Software by ICFOSS and Kerala Start-Up Mission at Mascot Hotel, Trivandrum from 20 to 21 December 2015.
- A Technical Presentation on Recent development in the field of Computer Science and Engineering was conducted by students Sharan Sabi, Jerin Sebastian, Jeril Jacob Babu, Geo Baby and Martin K. Vargese for S7 & S8 students in association with CSEA on 21 September 2015. It was coordinated by Mr. Jacob P. Cherian.
- One-week hands on workshop on Android Application Development was organised by members of Startup Boot camp of SJCET from 6 to 12 September 2015.
- Sethu Sathyan of S8 CSE secured student scholarship at Grace Hopper Celebration of women in computing in 2015.
- Five final year CSE students, Jeevan George Antony, Dona Maria Royce, Sethu Sathyan, Jackson M. Joseph and Jimmy Jose of S8 CSE secured the Best Startup idea presentation Award for NASSCOM startup 20-20 jointly organized by Kerala Start Up Mission and NASSCOM in August, 2015.
- Akshay Rejikumar, Mohammed Shaloof N. and Akshay Sivaprasad of EEE department secured second prize in the Soccer Colosseum at Mar Athanasios College, Ramapuram in 2015.
- Sharon Sam Kodunthara of EEE department secured first place in Magnetorace in the National Level Technical Fest at Saintgits College of Engineering, Pathamuttom in 2015.
- Justin Joseph of EEE department secured third place in Men's Kumite in the 9 Shihan Bonnie Robert's Memorial National Karate Championship held at Pala in 2015.
- ENCON Green Club members presented a Seminar on Energy Conservation at the ENCON GREEN Club Engineer's Forum, YMCA Building, Moonnani on 4 October 2015. ENCON Green Club Student Secretary M/s. Pranav Prasannan and Athul V. of EEE department presented the measures to be taken for Environment protection, Energy Conservation and Energy Efficiency.
- Kevin James, Arnold Antony, Jerin James, Linu M., Siddarth and Abhishek Sebastian secured Second prize for Acoustic Band Competition at Nakshatra 2016 held at Saintgits College of Engineering, Pathamuttom.

== Sports ==
=== Yoga and mediation ===
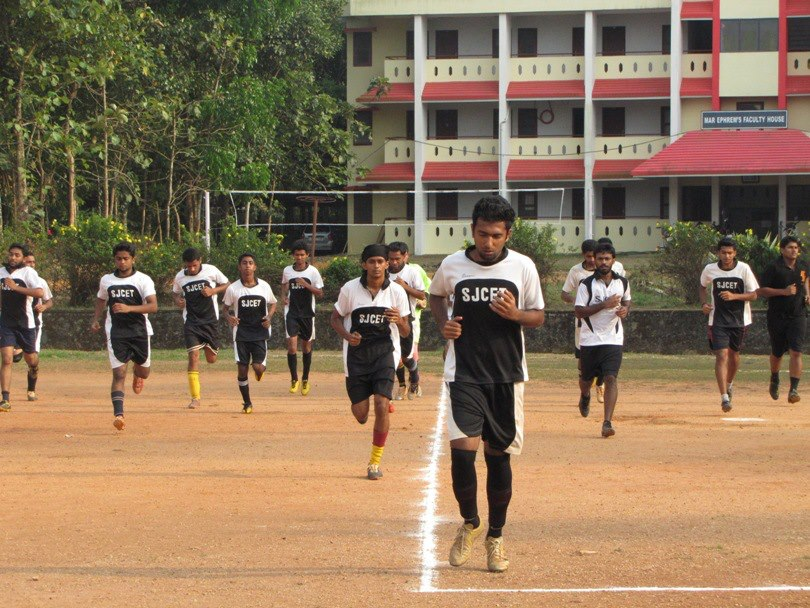
College football team on practice

Yoga and mediation training program was conducted for the first year students. A total of 90 hours training is being conducted for nine batches where each batch has obtained at least 10 hours of training during this period. This has in turn resulted in improving mental as well as physical health of the students.

=== PACE annual inter-college meet ===
College conducts inter-college meet for various sports games annually, which has got wide participation reaching of count 15 from various colleges all over the Kerala state. The meet consists of total five events including volleyball, football, cricket, basketball, and badminton tournament.
