= Kunnumpuram =

Kunnumpuram Town
- Town
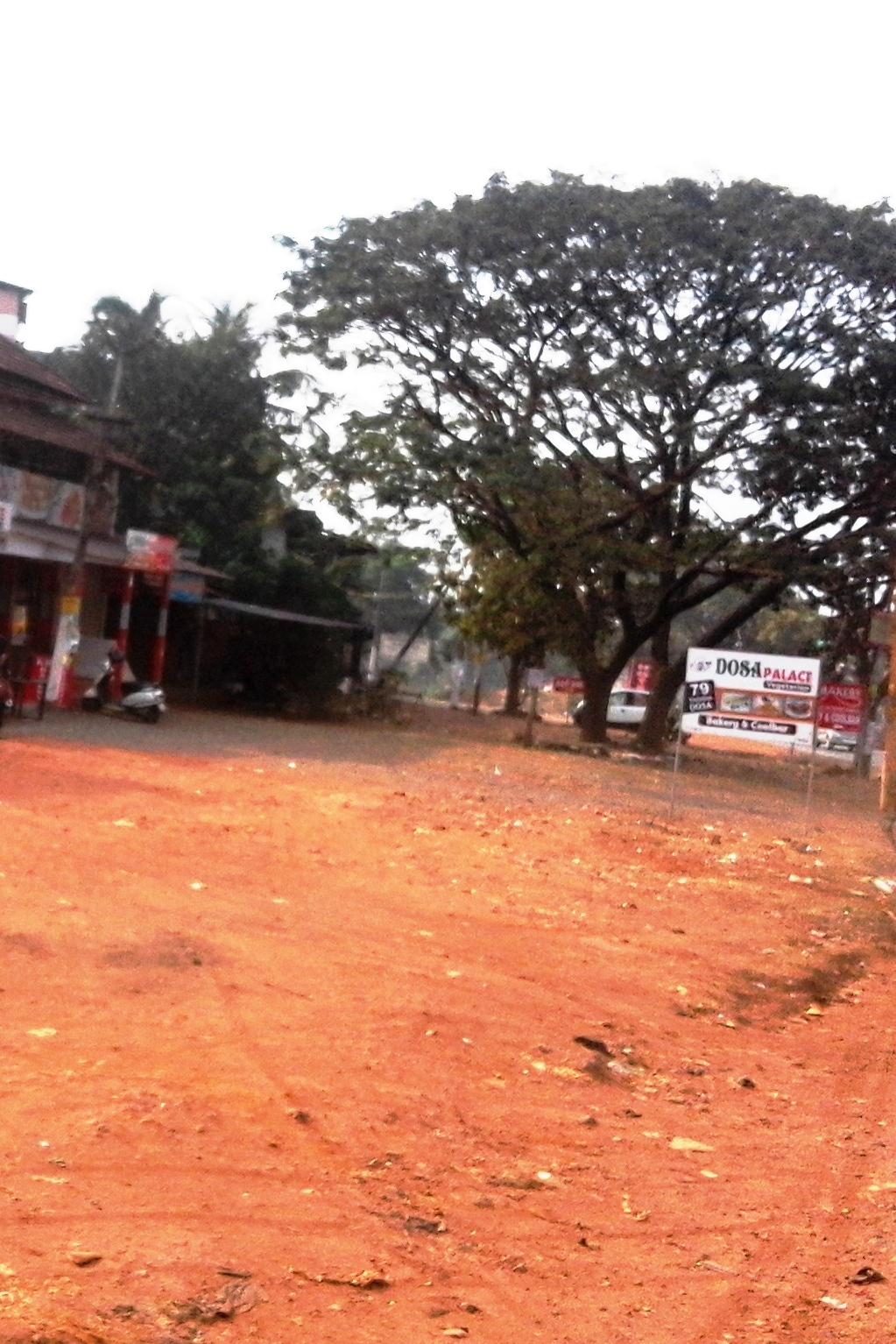
- Kolappuram junction from where the Kunnumpuram road begins
- Nickname: KMP
- Interactive map of Kunnumpuram Town
- Coordinates: 11°5′0″N 75°57′0″E
- Country: India
- State: Kerala
- District: Malappuram

Languages
  - Official: Malayalam, English
- Time zone: UTC+5:30 (IST)
- Postal code: 676305
- Vehicle registration: KL-65

Kunnumpuram is a small town in Malappuram district of Kerala. It is located south to Kondotty, west to Vengara and north to Tirurangadi. Kunnumpuram is famous for its Palliative Care Unit.

== How to reach ==
Nearest Railway Station: Parappanangadi
Nearest Airport: Calicut International Airport
By Road: from Kolappuram #NH 17# 3 km and from Kondotty #NH 213# 12 km. Only 15 km from the Kottakkal Arya Vaidya Sala, 10 km from Calicut International Airport and 13 km from the University of Calicut campus

== Culture And Politics ==
Politically it is an IUML(Indian Union Muslim League) majority area. And IUML won most of the parts of Kunnumpuram in all the recent panchayat elections. Kunnumpuram lies in Vengara (Legislative Assembly constituency) and Malappuram (Lok Sabha constituency).

Current MLA of Vengara is KNA Khadher and MP of Malappuram is PK Kunhalikkutti. Both of them represented IUML in the elections.

== Transportation ==
The nearest airport is at Kozhikode. The nearest major railway station is at Parappanangadi.

== See also ==
Rev. Fr. Kurien Kunnumpuram SJ Rev . Fr. Mohammed ASHRAF PE
