= V. Balakrishnan (author) =

Indian writer (born 1932)

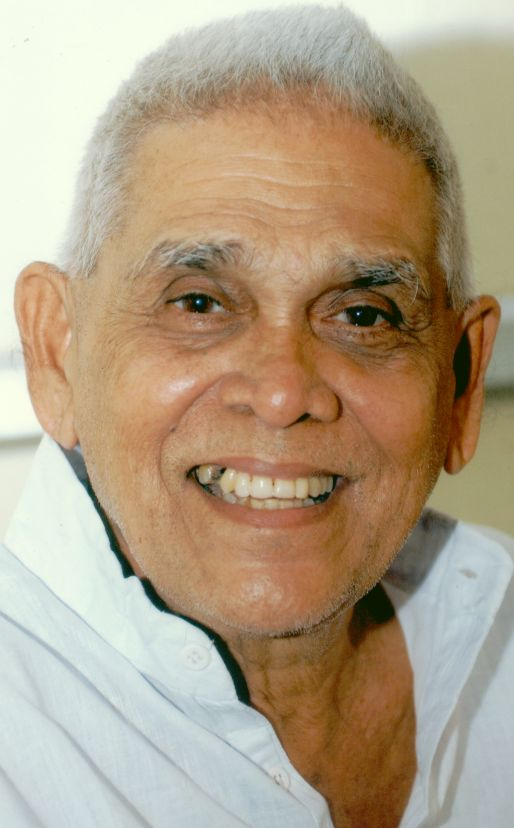
- V. Balakrishnan
- Born: 13 February 1932; Palai, Kerala, India
- Died: 2 August 2004 (aged 72); Palai, Kerala, India

V. Balakrishnan (13 February 1932 in Katappattoor near Pala – 2 August 2004 at Pala) was a prolific Malayalam writer and translator of texts between Malayalam, Sanskrit and English. He participated in the Indian independence movement, which resulted in his expulsion from college.

== Biography ==
In 1960, his short story, entitled Neelakoduveli ('നീലക്കൊടുവേലി'), was awarded first place in a competition conducted by the Kerala Dhwani ('കേരള ധ്വനി') newspaper. The children's book, Ithu Nammute Naatanu ('ഇതു നമ്മുടെ നാടാണ്‌'), came first in the competition held by Sahitya Pravarthaka Sahakarana Sangam ('സാഹിത്യപ്രവര്‍ത്തക സഹകരണ സംഘം'). Later, in 1962, his story about a rogue elephant, Ottayan' ('ഒറ്റയാന്‍'), won first prize in the contest held by Southern Language Book Trust (ദക്ഷിണഭാഷാ ബുക്ക്‌ ട്രസ്റ്റ്‌). It was later translated to all South Indian languages.

After his marriage to Dr. R. Leela Devi, they started their literary career together. As he required more time for his writing endeavours, he resigned his job as a high school teacher. They compiled the first Malayalam Encyclopedia in 1967. Thereafter he continued his activities together with his wife until her death in 1998.

Together they translated most of the Sanskrit Vedic works; including the Vedas, Puranas, Aranyakas, Upanishads, Dharsanas, Mahabharata, Valmiki Ramayana, Devi and Bhagavata Purana to Malayalam. He has 11,394 printed pages (D1/8 size) in 67 books in the genre of children's literature alone. Amir Hamsa ('അമീര്‍ ഹംസ'), a book for children, has 1148 pages with 500 illustrations. Together, he and his wife authored sixteen books related to Islam, including an Encyclopedia on the religion, as well as publications related to Hinduism and Christianity. In total, they have eleven publications in the English language.

== Published works ==
1. 7 Encyclopedias including a Hindu Encyclopedia
2. 21 Novels
3. 24 Dictionaries
4. Various travelogues, short stories, biographies, studies, translations, study guides etc. numbering around 290
5. From Representation to Participation (First book on Panchayatiraj)
6. Sarojini Naidu (Biography)
7. Blue Jasmine (Fantasy novel)
8. Saffron (a novel exploring the myths of Kashmir)
9. Mannatthu Padmanabhan and the Revival of Nairs in Kerala
10. An Epoch in Kerala History
11. History of Malayalam Literature
12. Kerala History
13. Influence of English on Malayalam Literature
14. Indian National Congress - Hundred Years (History of the Indian National Congress published for its centenary)
