= Lalloo Alphonse =

- Born: Lalloo Alphonse; 18 June 1987 (age 38); Kanjirappally, Kerala, India
- Occupations: Singer, assistant professor of english
- Years active: 2015–present
- Website: singingcouple.com

Lalloo Alphonse is a Malayali singer and assistant professor in English literature. She is a popular Singer and band performer with live performances top listed in YouTube and other social Medias. Singing the Indian Semi-Classical Music Hindi film Song "Mere dholna Sun" from Film Bhool Bhulaiya at the wedding eve of her brother is her most recognized performance. She sang Malayalam songs at college functions.

== Early life ==
Lalloo was born on 18 June 1987 in Chemmalamattom, Kanjirapally, Kerala. She began her music training at a young age at home. Her father Alphonse James was a professional guitarist and her mother Valsa Alphonse is a singer, her younger brother Leo Alphonse is running an IT firm at Palai. She did her schooling at St Joseph's E.M.H.S.S Kunnumbhagam and A.M.H.S.S Kalaketty. After completing her graduation in English Literature from Alphonsa College, Pala, she did her post-graduation from Devamatha college, Kuravilangad. Also holds another post-graduation in Linguistics from Annamalai University. Her credentials include successful completion of the Cambridge CELTA Course from the British Council, which has equipped her with the necessary skills and knowledge to teach English to non-native speakers proficiently. Actively participating in various stage shows and church choirs along with education, she managed to succeed both in academics and Music Career. Formal training for Carnatic music was under the Music Teachers Teekoy Radhakrishnan and Ponkunnam Jose, now continuing advanced training in Music at Liquid School of Music, Kochi under the famous Pianist and musician Robin Thomas. She started her teaching career as an Assistant professor of English Literature from 2011 at Alphonsa College, Pala. Later she worked at Mar Augusthinose college Ramapuram and St. Dominic's College, Kanjirappally.In 2015, she married Anup Thomas, who is an IT professional and singer.

== Musical career ==
After the marriage the wedding reception song performed by her and her spouse become most variety song for Netizens, later with her husband, singing couple band was established and they are doing different stage shows in India and abroad. She is Invited to sing on the Upcoming Movie by Malayalam Film Director Bhadran (director) with actor Mohanlal as lead Character. Wedding song made Lalloo Alphons's musical journey special, the duet sung by bride & bride groom become the hot news reports for channels and news papers. Interviews at Malayala Manorama and Reporter TV made Lalloo Alphonse the favorite singing teacher among television and internet audience. Deccan chronicle news paper dated (6 – March – 2017) published a special news article about Lalloo Alphonse Musical Talent and ambitions. Recently released her debut Hindi cover song for 'Bahon Mein Chale Aoo' the popular Lata Mageshkar voice from Anamika Movie on YouTube channel.

== Recognition ==
National media News18 and NDTV published the sensational news report about Kerala singer singing just like Shreya Ghoshal in a live performance. Now the video song crossed more than 2 Million Views on Internet. Many news platforms like Malayala Manorama, Mathrubhumi, Dailyhunt, Deccan Chronicle, mentioned Lalloo Alphonse Hindi song video as most viewed viral video. Her all songs got wide acceptance in other languages too, mainly in Telugu and Hindi. Telangana news channel Namasthe Telangana recently published her new video song in their portal. Another milestone in her musical career is to become the most popular singer in the worldwide online competition, V.J Traven Music Contest conducted by Malayalam Christian Network. She also associated with Grammy Award winner musician Manoj George for a devotional album, singing the Main song. Shishiram pozhiyum is her debut shortfilm song for the movie Nth Heaven. Lalloo Alphonse honoured by Ex-Chief minister of Kerala Shri. Oommen Chandy at the occasion of Deepika best Christian college award ceremony in backwater ripples. Onmanorama recently published an article about her 'Bahon Mein Chale Aao' cover song. Most latest story on the Kerala's first daily Newspaper Deepika about Singing teacher in its Column Sunday Deepika which grabs the attention of many offline, print media audience too.

Lalloo made her debut recording in Telugu for a devotional song 'Naa Yesu Nadha' in March 2020.
