= Illickal Kallu =

Illikkal rock
- Tourist destination
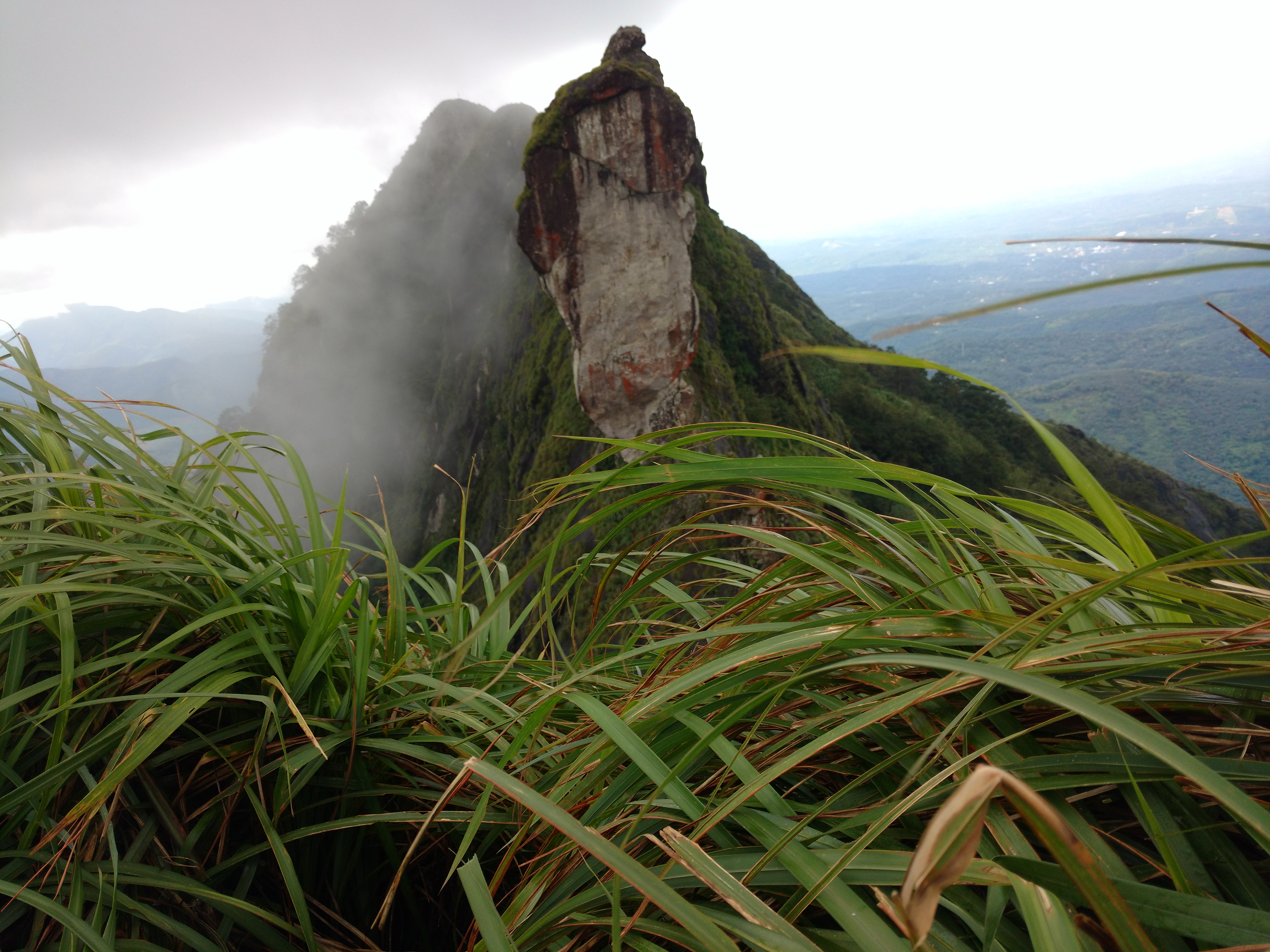
- Illikkal rock

- Location in Kotayam, Kerala, India Illikkal rock (India)
- Coordinates: 9°44′43″N 76°48′42″E
- Country: India
- State: Kerala
- District: Kottayam

Government
  - Type: Panchayat
  - Body: മൂന്നിലവ്, Thalanadu

Area
  - Total: 33.41 km^{2} (12.90 sq mi)
- Elevation: 1,036 m (3,399 ft)

Languages
  - Official: Malayalam, English
- Time zone: UTC+5:30 (IST)
- PIN: 686580
- Vehicle registration: KL-35
- Nearest city: Thodupuzha, Moonnilavu, Erattupetta, Pala
- Mountain Range: Western Ghats

Illikkal Kallu/Illikkankal is a monolith located on top of the Illickal Malaa in the Kottayam district of Kerala, India.Illickal Kallu is a major tourist attraction located in Moonnilavu grama panchayat of Thalanadu village in Meenachil taluk, Kottayam district. Situated at an elevation of around 3,500 feet (1,067 m) above sea level, the site is approximately 57 km from Kottayam railway station. Only one half of the original rock formation remains, as the other half has collapsed. The nearest town is Teekoy. Several mountain streams originate from the peak and flow downward to form the Meenachil River. Visitors need to trek less than 1 km to reach the summit.

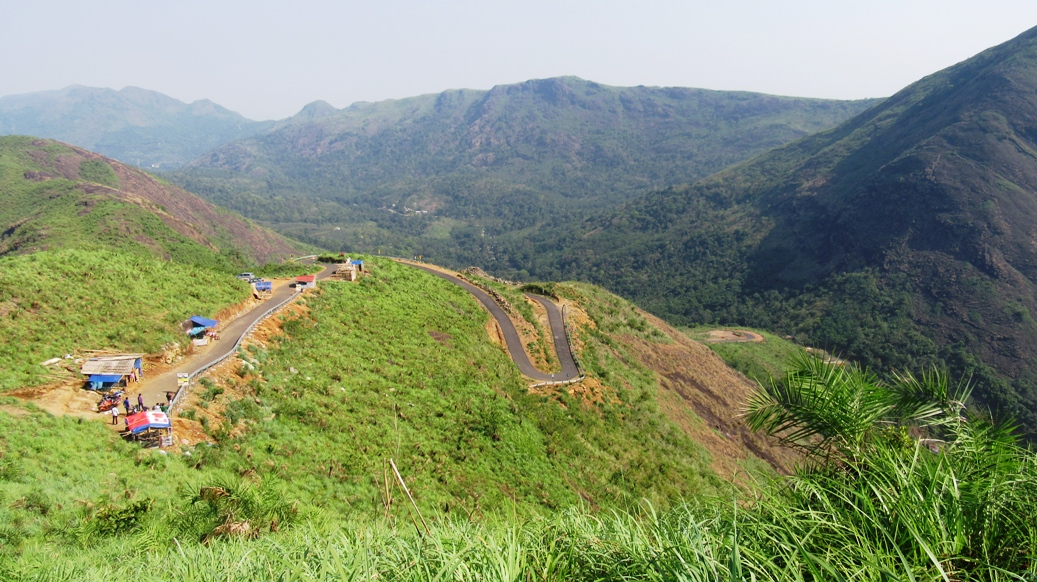
A Road leading to Illikal kallu

Illikkal Mala consists of three hills, each rising to about 4,000 feet (1,220 m) above sea level. The hills have distinctive shapes: one resembles a mushroom and is known as Kuda Kallu (umbrella rock), while another has a slight protrusion and is called Koonu Kallu (hunchback rock). A narrow half-foot-wide natural bridge known as Narakapalam (bridge to hell) connects these two hills. The landscape of Illikkal Kallu is often compared to the pillar rocks of Kodaikanal. Local tradition holds that the mythical medicinal herb known as Neela Koduveli grows in the area. This blue flower is believed in folklore to possess special powers associated with prosperity and a good harvest.

From the hilltops, the Arabian Sea is visible on the distant horizon. On clear evenings, particularly around the full moon, visitors can observe the sunset and the rising moon from the summit.

== Etymology ==
The name Illikkal Kallu (also spelled Illickal Kallu) refers to the prominent rock formation on Illikkal Mala. In Malayalam, kallu means "rock". The individual hills that make up the formation have descriptive names based on their shapes: Kuda Kallu (umbrella rock) and Koonu Kallu (hunchback rock). The main peak is known as Illikkal Kallu, taking its name from the hill itself.

== History and folklore ==
Documented historical records about Illikkal Kallu are limited. The site is primarily known through local oral traditions and folklore.

According to local belief, the mythical medicinal herb known as Neela Koduveli is said to grow in the area, particularly associated with Kuda Kallu. The plant is described in folklore as possessing special powers related to prosperity and well-being.

One popular legend links the region to the Mahabharata. It is said that the Pandavas stayed in the area during their exile, and that Bhima threw his pestle (ulakka) in anger, creating a stream known as Ulakkapara Thodu.

The rock formations themselves are regarded by local communities as natural features of long-standing cultural significance in the Meenachil highlands.

== Geography ==
Illikkal Kallu is a rock formation located on Illikkal Mala in Moonnilavu grama panchayat of Thalanadu village, Meenachil taluk, Kottayam district, Kerala. It lies at an elevation of approximately 3,500 feet (1,067 m) above sea level.

The formation consists of three hills, each rising to about 4,000 feet (1,220 m). The hills are distinguished by their shapes: Kuda Kallu (umbrella-shaped or mushroom-like rock), Koonu Kallu (hunchback rock), and the main peak known as Illikkal Kallu. A narrow natural bridge called Narakapalam connects two of the hills. Only one half of the original rock of the main peak remains, as the other portion has collapsed.

Several mountain streams originate from the peak and flow downward to form the Meenachil River. The landscape is often compared to the pillar rocks of Kodaikanal. On clear days, the Arabian Sea is visible on the distant horizon from the summit.

== Climate ==
Illikkal Kallu experiences a cool and misty highland climate typical of the Western Ghats. The weather remains relatively pleasant for most of the year, with frequent mist and cloud cover, especially in the mornings and evenings.

The region receives heavy rainfall during the southwest monsoon (June to September), when the hills become lush but the rocks and trekking paths can turn slippery. The post-monsoon and winter months (October to February) generally offer clearer skies and more comfortable conditions for visitors. Summers (March to May) are milder than in the lowlands due to the elevation.

== Tourism ==
Illikkal Kallu is a popular trekking and viewpoint destination in Kottayam district. Visitors are drawn to the distinctive rock formations, panoramic views of the surrounding hills and valleys, and the opportunity to see the Arabian Sea on the distant horizon on clear days.

The main attractions include the three uniquely shaped hills — Kuda Kallu, Koonu Kallu, and Illikkal Kallu — along with the narrow natural bridge known as Narakapalam. A short trek of less than 1 km is required to reach the summit from the nearest accessible point.

The site is known for its misty atmosphere and scenic sunsets. Local folklore associated with the mythical herb Neela Koduveli and legends linked to the Mahabharata also add to the cultural interest of the place. Basic facilities are limited, and visitors are advised to take care on the rocky paths, especially during the monsoon when surfaces can become slippery.

== Transportation ==
Illikkal Kallu is accessible by road. The nearest major railway station is Kottayam railway station, approximately 57 km away. The nearest towns are Teekoy and Erattupetta. Cochin International Airport is about 85 km from the site.

Visitors typically travel by road from Kottayam, Pala, or Erattupetta. From the nearest accessible point, a short trek of less than 1 km is required to reach the summit. Local jeep services are sometimes available from nearby towns for the final stretch of the journey.
