= Chemmalamattam =

- village
- Location in Kerala, India Chemmalamattam (India)
- Coordinates: 9.6376°N 76.7771°E
- Country: India
- State: Kerala
- District: Kottayam

Languages
  - Official: Malayalam, English
- Time zone: UTC+5:30 (IST)
- PIN: 686529
- Telephone code: 914828
- Vehicle registration: KL-05/KL-35
- Nearest city: Kanjirappally, Kottayam, Erattupetta, Thodupuzha
- Sex ratio: 1:1 ♂/♀
- Literacy: 100%
- Lok Sabha constituency: Pathanamthitta
- Climate: Tropical monsoon (Köppen)
- Avg. summer temperature: 32 °C (90 °F)
- Avg. winter temperature: 18 °C (64 °F)

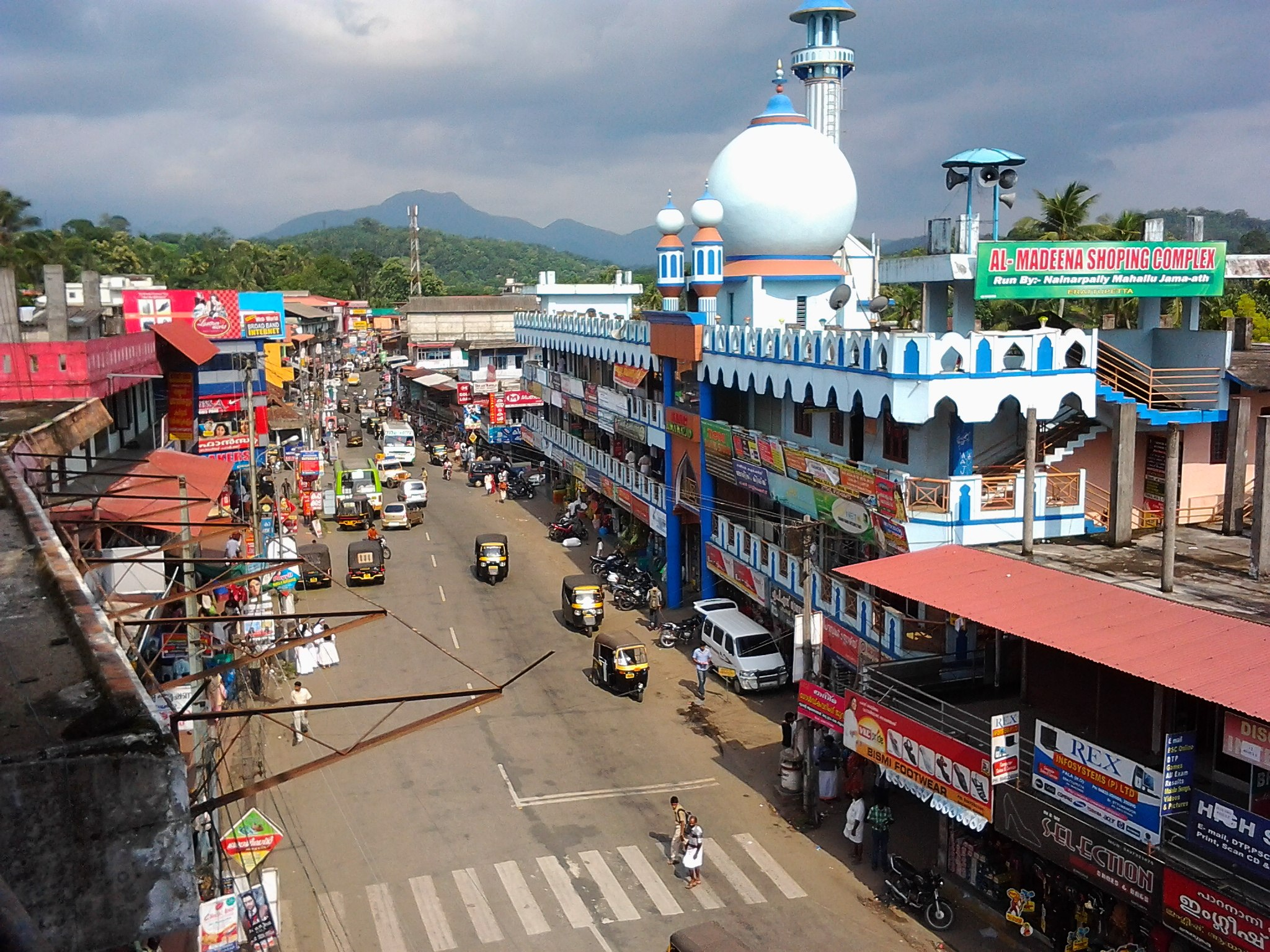
The View of Eratupetta City near the Western Ghats.

Chemmalamattam(otherwise known as Chemmalamattom) is a village in the Thidanadu Panchayat, in the Kottayam district of Kerala, India. It is located about 40 km east of Kottayam and 19 km west of Mundakkayam and is 9.5 km north of Kanjirappally towards Erattupetta.

== Location ==
The village headquarters is at Kondoor, the taluk headquarters is located at Meenachil, and the district headquarters at Kottayam. This village is part of the Poonjar Legislative Assembly and Pathanamthitta LokSabha constituency. Local people mostly work as farmers, cultivating cash crops such as rubber and cocoa, and agricultural crops such as cassava and plantain.

== Transportation ==
The nearest railway stations are at Kottayam (40 km), Changanacherry (43 km) or Ettumanoor (30 km). The nearest airport, Cochin International Airport is 66 km away.

== Landmarks ==
Locally, the XII Apostles' Church is a Roman Catholic, Syro Malabar church.

== How to Reach ==
- Thiruvananthapuram - Kottarakkara - Adoor - Pathanamthitta - Ranni - Erumeli - Kanjirappally - Chemmalamattam
- Kottayam - Ettumanoor - Pala - Erattupetta - Chemmalamattam
- Kochi/Cochin - Trhippunithura - Poothotta - Thalayolapparambu - Ettumanoor - Pala - Erattupetta - Chemmalamattam
