= Jacob Thomas (police officer) =

Retired Indian Police Service officer (born 1960)

Jacob Thomas IPS (Retd.)
- Born: 15 May 1960 (age 66); Kottayam, Kerala, India
- Education: St. George’s College, Aruvithura; Kerala Agricultural University, Thrissur; Indian Agricultural Research Institute, New Delhi; Sardar Vallabhbhai Patel National Police Academy, Hyderabad
- Spouse: Daisy Jacob
- Police career
- Country: India
- Allegiance: Indian Police Service
- Department: Kerala Police
- Service years: 1986–2020
- Status: Director General of Police (Retd.)
- Rank: Director General of Police (Retired)
- Awards: 2016 Police Medal for Meritorious Service; 2015 Manorama News Newsmaker Award
- Other work: Politician; Bharatiya Janata Party (2021–present)

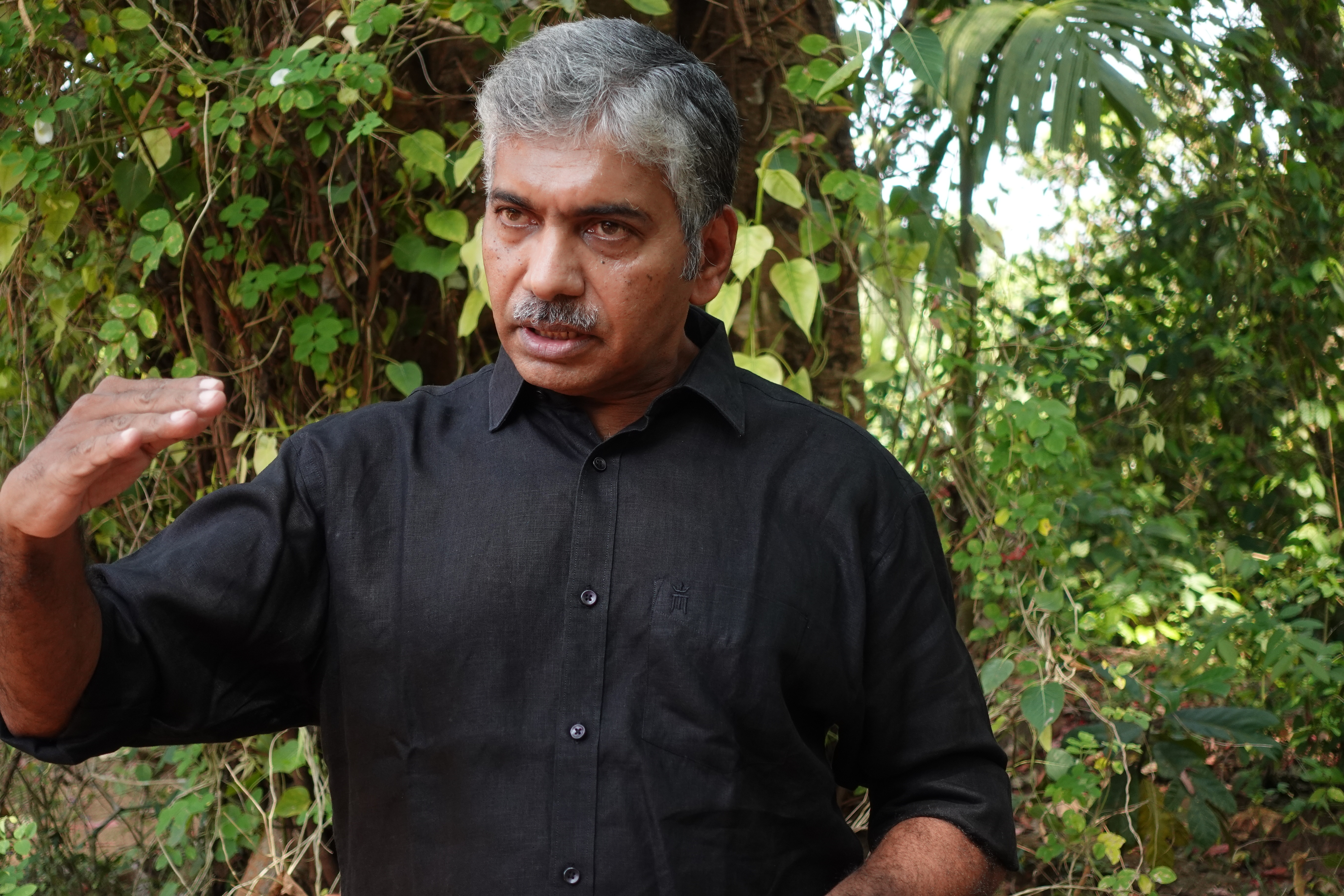
Jacob Thomas in 2021

Jacob Thomas (born 15 May 1960) is a retired Indian Police Service officer, writer, researcher and a politician from Bharatiya Janata Party. He is popularly known as former Director of Vigilance & Anti-Corruption Bureau (VACB), Government of Keralam, and a recipient of the Police Medal for Meritorious Service as well as the Newsmaker of the Year Award of Malayala Manorama. He retired on 31 May 2020, as the head of Shoranur Metal Industries and spent the last day in office by sleeping on the floor. His 34-year police career attracted several controversies such as undisclosed property of over 50 acres in Tamil Nadu, encroached forest land of 151 acres in the name of his wife in Kodagu, Karnataka among many others. He is an active member of Rashtriya Swayamsevak Sangh, a Hindu nationalist volunteer organisation.

== Biography ==
Born on 15 May 1960 at Teekoy, a village in Kottayam district of the south Indian state of Kerala, Jacob Thomas did his schooling at St. Mary's High School in Teekoy after which he completed the pre-degree course at St. George's College Aruvithura before graduating in BSc Agricultural from KAU. Subsequently, he secured PG and PhD degrees from Indian Agricultural Research Institute, New Delhi. Later, obtained a second PhD in human resources development. He also earned a postgraduate diploma in Environment and Sustainable Development. In 1984, he passed the Civil Services Exam to be inducted into the service in 1985.

Jacob Thomas is married to Daisy.

== Career ==
Thomas started his police service in 1987 as an Assistant Superintendent of Police, his initial postings were at Thodupuzha and Kasaragod and in 1989, he was promoted as the Superintendent of Police at the Criminal Investigation Department, a post he held until 1991 when he was appointed as the managing director of the Plantation Corporation of Kerala Limited. His next posting was at the Kerala State Horticulture Products Development Corporation (Horticorp), as its managing director in 1993. He went back to police service in 1997 as the Commissioner of Police of Kochi and returned to the Crime Investigation Department as a Deputy Inspector General of Police (DIG) in 1998 but his tenure there was short as he was moved to the Kerala Women's Commission as its director the next year. He held the post for almost five years before moving to the Motor Vehicles Department of the Government of Keralam in 2003 as the Joint Transport Commissioner.

The next posting of Thomas was as the Chief Investigation Officer of the Kerala State Human Rights Commission in 2003, followed by postings as the senior advisor of administration at the Kerala State Council for Science, Technology and Environment, in 2004 and as the chairman and managing director of the Kerala State Civil Supplies Corporation, the same year. He became the chairman of the board of directors of the Kerala State Film Development Corporation, simultaneously serving as a member of the board of governors of Sree Chitra Thirunal College of Engineering, as a member of the board of directors of the Kerala State Road Transport Corporation and as the managing director of the Kerala Transport Development Finance Corporation during the period until 2010 when he was appointed as the managing director of the Kerala Shipping and Inland Navigation Corporation. He also held the position of the director of ports.

Jacob Thomas was promoted as the Additional Director General of Police in 2014 with a placement at the Lokayukta and later at the Vigilance & Anti-Corruption Bureau as its director, a post he held until 2015. He returned to head the Vigilance & Anti-Corruption Bureau in 2016, in between he served as the Director General of the Fire and Rescue Services, Civil Defense and Home Guards and as the chairman and managing director of the Kerala Police Housing & Construction Corporation.

In 2017, he was appointed as the Director General of the Institute of Management in Government, Apex Training Institute of the Government of Kerala, but was suspended from service in December 2017. Though he was reinstated after the period of suspension, he was served a second suspension notice in April 2018, citing the publication of his autobiography as the reason. In December 2018, his suspension was extended by another six months.

Thomas retired from service as the managing director of The Metal Industries Limited, Shoranur on 31 May 2020.

== Other activities ==
Jacob Thomas has been involved with a number of non-governmental organizations such as Top Centre, Darshan, and ExcelKerala, the last one a platform for open exchange of information on governance. He has also been associated with several international agencies such as UNICEF, UNDP, KAF, Department for International Development and Ford Foundation. He authored two books on management, Strategic Management and Environmental Management, besides two other books, Kaaryavum Kaaranavum, a memoirs on his service life and Sraavukalkoppam Neenthumpol (Swimming With The Sharks), his autobiography.

== Awards and honours ==
Jacob Thomas, who has been the captain of the Athletics team of the Sardar Vallabhbhai Patel National Police Academy, Hyderabad and the recipient of the best probationer of the academy, was selected as the Newsmaker of the Year 2015 by Manorama News. He received the President's Police Medal for Meritorious Service from the President of India in 2016.

== Controversies ==
Jacob Thomas retired as the richest police officer in the history of Kerala Police holding declared assets of over Rs 42 crores in 2021. The biggest allegations against Jacob Thomas was that he holds undisclosed land in multiple states including 50 acres in Sethur village in Rajapalayam taluk of Virudhunagar in Tamil Nadu. His actions over the years have earned him the tag of a rebel cop, has been involved in a number of controversies during his career. In January 2017, a writ petition was filed against him at the Muvattupuzha Vigilance Court alleging corrupt practices while he was heading the Kerala Transport Development Finance Corporation. His actions as the vigilance director against two additional chief secretaries and E. P. Jayarajan. the then minister of industries, are reported to have forced Pinarayi Vijayan, the chief minister of Kerala, to ask him to go on leave and his return to service was as the head of the Institute of Management in Government, an administrative position. Earlier, he had alleged that his actions against political leaders such as R. Balakrishna Pillai, C. Divakaran and K. Babu were the reasons for removing him from the post of the vigilance director in his first stint. His investigation in the bar bribery case involving K. M. Mani, former finance minister, also attracted media attention. At the time of retirement, he was facing a government-level probe for penning an autobiography without obtaining prior sanction had found him of having committed serious breach of discipline and criminal misconduct that should earn him major disciplinary actions. According to the All India Services (Discipline and Appeal) Rules, 1969, major disciplinary actions include demotion to a lower rank, compulsory retirement and termination from service.

He was demoted from DGP to ADGP by the Kerala Government in January 2020.

== Political career ==
Thomas joined Bharatiya Janata Party in 2021 and was nominated to fight 2021 Kerala Legislative Assembly election from Irinjalakuda constituency. He lost to the candidate of the Communist Party of India (Marxist).

== Bibliography ==
- Thomas, Jacob (2014). Environmental Management. Pearson India.
- Thomas, Jacob (2015). Strategic Management. Pearson India. ISBN 978-93-325-3540-4.
- Thōmas, Jacob (2017). Kaaryavum Kaaranavum. Kottayam, Kerala State, India: DC Books. ISBN 9789386680259. OCLC 1027034869.
- Thomas, Jacob (2017). Sraavukalkoppam Neenthumpol. Current Books. ISBN 978-8122613957.

== See also ==
- T. P. Senkumar
- Lokanath Behera
- V. Joseph Thomas
