= Panackapalam =

- small town
- Location in Kerala, India Panackapalam (India)
- Coordinates: 9°42′00.4″N 76°45′29.9″E
- Country: India
- State: Kerala
- District: Kottayam

Government
  - Body: Gram Panchayat

Languages
  - Official: Malayalam, English
- Time zone: UTC+5:30 (IST)
- PIN: 686579
- Telephone code: 914822
- Vehicle registration: KL- 35
- Literacy: 100%
- Lok Sabha constituency: Kottayam
- Vidhan Sabha constituency: Pala

Panackapalam is a small town of meenachil taluk located in the Kottayam district of Kerala state, India.
