= Teekoy =

- Village
- Location in Kerala, India Teekoy (India)
- Coordinates: 9°42′0″N 76°47′0″E
- Country: India
- State: Kerala
- District: Kottayam
- Founder: Thomas Kottukapally

Government
  - Type: Gram panchayat
  - Body: Panchayat samiti
  - Panchayat President: K.C James Kavalamakkal

Area
  - Total: 27.19 km^{2} (10.50 sq mi)

Population (2001)
  - Total: 10,272
  - Density: 377.8/km^{2} (978.5/sq mi)

Languages
  - Official: Malayalam, English
- Time zone: UTC+5:30 (IST)
- PIN: 686580
- Telephone code: 04822
- Vehicle registration: KL-35
- Nearest town(s): Vagamon, Erattupetta, Pala, Kottayam, Kanjirappally, and Thodupuzha
- Lok Sabha constituency: Pathanamthitta
- Literacy: 98.86%

Teekoy is a southern Indian village in the eastern part of Kottayam district in Kerala state. On 1 January 1962, it was established as a third grade gram panchayat.

Teekoy is located 18 km east of the town Pala, and is 44 km north-east of the district capital Kottayam. It is between the towns of Vagamon, Poonjar, Erattupetta, and Thalanadu. The village is situated about 165 km north of the state capital, Thiruvananthapuram.

== Geography ==
Teekoy has features of both midland countryside and the Malanad hill area. Teekoy as a village is medium-sized but as a panchayat is quite long. It covers many areas such as Aniyilappu, Mavadi, Vellikulam, Thalanad and Adukkom, stretching about 20 kilometres and reaching up to Vagamon, at about three thousand feet above sea level, for a total area of 10.5 square miles (27 km^{2}). The place is known for its agriculture and landscape. It is full of hills and valleys in the middle of which flows the Meenachil River.

== Agriculture ==
Agriculture forms the mainstay of Teekoy’s economy. The village is known for its rubber plantations; the first large-scale rubber plantation in India was established here. Most residents are farmers who cultivate rubber along with a variety of spices and other crops suited to the midland and highland terrain, including cardamom, ginger, black pepper, clove, nutmeg, turmeric, cashew, coconut and arecanut. A range of medicinal plants grown in the area have traditionally been used in home remedies.

The hilly landscape, with its valleys and the Meenachil River, supports plantation-style cultivation. Rubber remains the dominant cash crop, while spice cultivation continues as an important secondary activity.

== People ==
Large-scale settlement in Teekoy began more than 100 years ago. It resembles a tropical rainforest, and trees like teak and jackfruit are found in the Western Ghats region, growing alongside coconut, rubber, arecanut, and other crops. The first large-scale rubber plantation in India was established in Teekoy. Most of the people are farmers and they cultivate rubber, elachi, ginger, cardamom, clove, nutmeg, turmeric, pepper, cashew and other spices. A considerable variety of medicinal plants are also grown in Teekoy which have been used in making traditional home remedies.

There are some third- and fourth-generation Tamil people, descendants of workers who came to work in the rubber plantations in Teekoy many decades ago. Before independence in 1947, Teekoy had some English people who had set up rubber plantations in the area. As a legacy of the colonial era, a cantilever bridge still connects the two banks of the Meenachil River two kilometres above Teekoy. Former DGP Jacob Thomas IPS is from Teekoy.

== Demographics ==
As of the 2011 Census of India, Teekoy village had a total population of 9,418, of which 4,792 were males and 4,626 were females. There were 2,181 households. The population of children aged 0–6 years was 856 (9.09% of the total population). The average sex ratio was 965 females per 1,000 males, while the child sex ratio was 986.

The literacy rate of Teekoy village was 96.86%, higher than the state average of 94%. Male literacy stood at 97.62% and female literacy at 96.07%. Scheduled Castes constituted 3.60% (339 persons) and Scheduled Tribes 3.53% (332 persons) of the population.

== Culture ==
Teekoy is a rural yet modern village characterized by predominantly hilly topography. The village maintains a strong cultural identity, actively celebrating annual festivals and church feasts. The Indian National Congress and Kerala Congress (M) are the major political parties in the area. Adv. Justin Jacob, a member of Kerala Congress (M), became the youngest president of the Teekoy Grama Panchayat at the age of 27

People at Teekoy are educated and self-employed or employed either in government, private or abroad. Educational institutions include St. Mary's High School, now more than six decades old.

== Religion ==
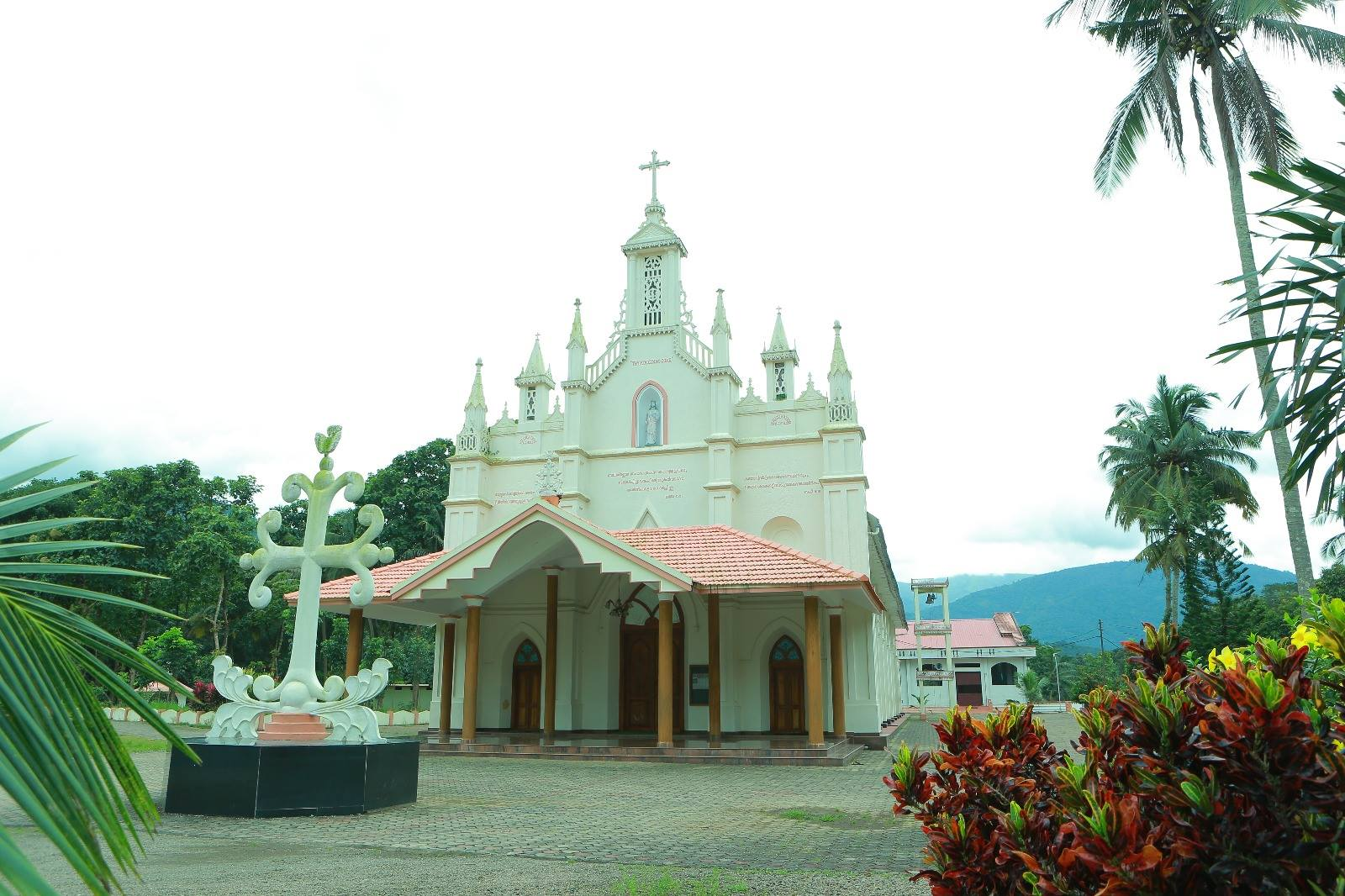
St Mary's Forane Church in Teekoy, Kerala.

A sizable proportion of the population is Syrian Christian (Syro-Malabar Catholic), but there is also a large minority of Muslims and Hindus. There is a small colony of converted Dalit Christians as well.

The noted Roman Catholic theologian Kurien Kunnumpuram (1931–2018) was born in Teekoy.

Places of worship include:

- St Mary's Forane Church, Teekoy - under the Syro-Malabar Diocese of Pala
- Teekoy Jama Masjid Mosque
- Sree Narayana Guru Mandhiram
- Sree Karuvela Muthu Swami Kovil
- St Thomas Syro-Malabar Church Mangalagiri
- St Joseph Church

== Climate ==
Teekoy's climate has a heavy rain season and mild summer. Summer rains are not infrequent. With hills in the backdrop, it never gets very hot, and the climate tends towards windy and cool.
