= Katappattor =

- town
- Location in Kerala, India Katappattor (India)
- Coordinates: 9°42′24″N 76°40′25″E
- Country: India
- State: Kerala
- District: Kottayam

Languages
  - Official: Malayalam, English
- Time zone: UTC+5:30 (IST)
- Vehicle registration: KL-35

Kadappattoor is a small village on the banks of Meenachil river near Pala in Kottayam district of Kerala, 30 km east of Kottayam. The village is the location of the Shiva Kadappattoor Mahadeva Temple (also Kadappatoor Temple or "Katappattur Temple" or "Kadapattur Mahadeva Temple")

Thousands of pilgrims visit the Kadappattoor temple every year, on their way to Sabarimala.
