= Kurien Kunnumpuram =

Indian Jesuit priest and theologian

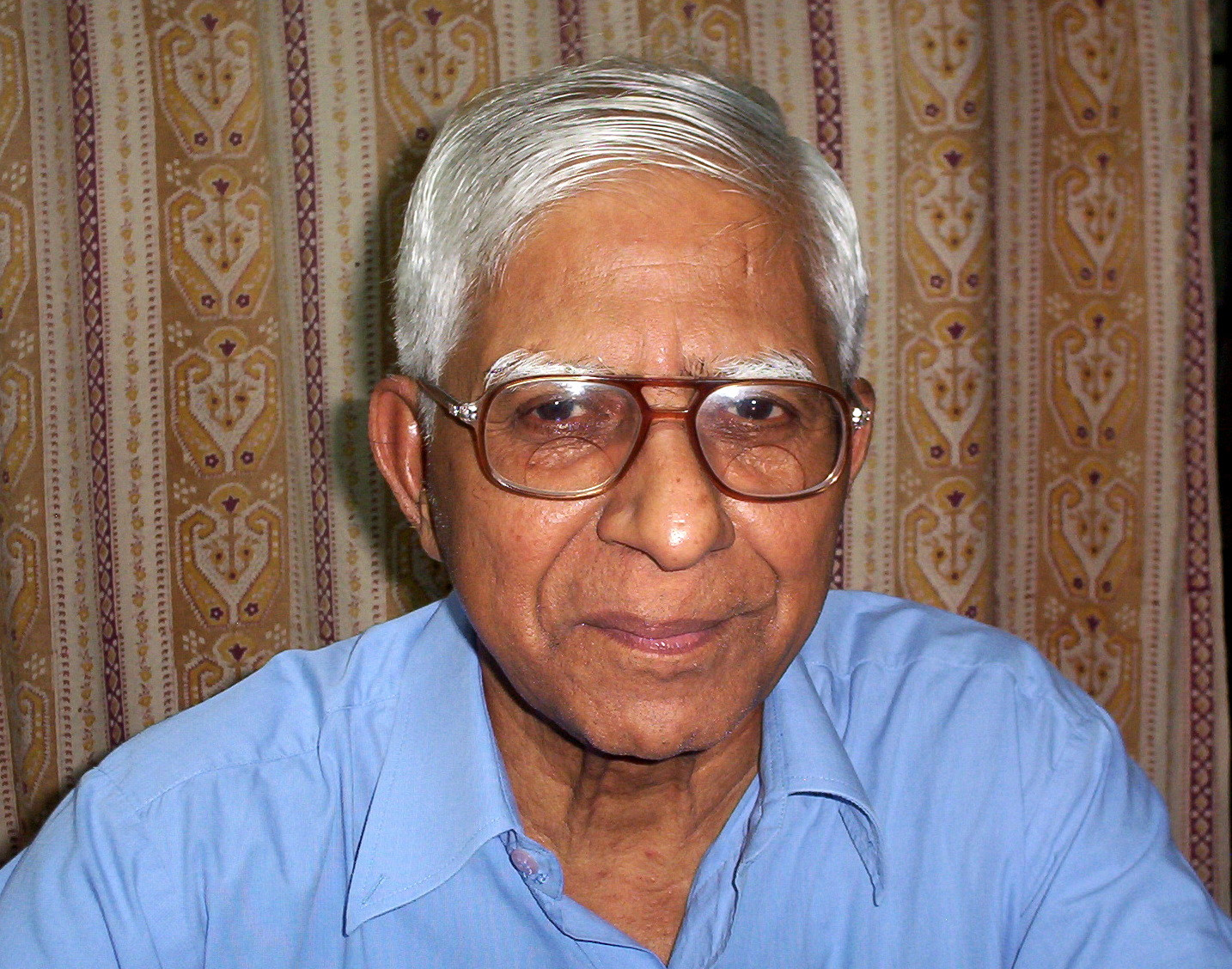
- Kunnumpuram in 2010
- Born: 8 July 1931; Teekoy, Kerala, India
- Died: 23 October 2018 (aged 87); Kozhikode, Kerala, India
- Occupations: Jesuit Priest, Theologian

Rev. Prof. (Dr) Kurien Kunnumpuram S.J. (8 July 1931 – 23 October 2018) was a Roman Catholic, Indian Jesuit priest and well-known Christian theologian. A member of the academic staff of the Faculty of Theology at Jnana Deepa, Institute of Philosophy and Theology, Pune (India) (Emeritus), he contributed in the field of ecclesiology, particularly with regard to Vatican II.

He was the founder-publisher-editor of Jnanadeepa: Pune Journal of Religious Studies, from 1998 to 2010. He was also the founding editor of JDV's Encyclopedia of Indian Christian Theology, till 2009. He was the editor of AUC: Asian Journal of Religious Studies.

== Life and career ==
Kunnumpuram was born on 8 July 1931 in Teekoy, Kerala, India. He entered the Society of Jesus in 1950 and was ordained a priest in March 1963.

He pursued advanced studies at the University of Innsbruck, completing a Doctorate in Systematic Theology in 1968 on “Ways of Salvation.” The following year he began teaching theology at Jnana Deepa, Institute of Philosophy and Theology in Pune, India, became faculty dean in 1974 (serving until 1977), and served as rector from 1987 to 1993.

In January 1998, he founded the Jnanadeepa: Pune Journal of Religious Studies and served as its editor-publisher, and, beginning in 2002, he edited AUC: Asian Journal of Religious Studies for the Papal Seminary, Pune.

Kunnumpuram’s 80th birthday was marked at the Papal Seminary in Pune with a Mass and felicitation hosted by Rt Rev Thomas Dabre, Bishop of Pune. Shortly before his passing, a national seminar was held in his honour, recognising his contribution to Indian Catholic theology.

== Later life and death ==
In 2013, Kunnumpuram returned to the Jesuit Province of Kozhikode in Kerala, where he continued to write and mentor younger scholars; among his late publications was Freedom and Joy (2018).

On 17 November 2017, at the age of 86, he experienced a mild stroke. In October 2018, a national seminar in Pune honoured his theological contributions.

He suffered a blood clot in the brain on 25 September 2018, which left him in a coma, and died on 23 October 2018 at Nirmala Hospital in Kozhikode, Kerala, India.

== Bibliography ==
=== Books authored by Kunnumpuram ===
- Kunnumpuram, K. (2018). Freedom and Joy: Reflections on the Essential Characteristics of Christian Life Today. New Delhi: Christian World Imprints.
- Kunnumpuram, K. (2014). Give More than You Take. Mumbai: St Pauls.
- Kunnumpuram, K. (2012). Called to Serve. Mumbai: St Pauls.
- Kunnumpuram, K. (2010). Life in Abundance. Mumbai: St Pauls.
- Kunnumpuram, K. (2009). Towards the Fullness of Life: Reflections on the Daily Living of the Faith. Mumbai: St Pauls.
- Kunnumpuram, K. (2007). The Indian Church of the Future. Mumbai: St Pauls.
- Kunnumpuram, K. (2005). Towards a New Humanity: Reflections on the Church’s Mission in India Today. Mumbai: St Pauls.
- Kunnumpuram, K.; Fernando, L. (1993). Quest for an Indian Church: An Exploration of the Possibilities Opened Up by Vatican II. Anand: Gujarat Sahitya Prakash.
- Kunnumpuram, K. (1971). Ways of Salvation. Mumbai: Papal Athenaeum. (Note: For later scholarly engagement with this work, see: "Ways of Salvation and the Way of Salvation". Zenodo. 2 June 2019..; "Ways of Salvation and the Way of Salvation". Academia.edu..; "Indian Theologians and the Catholic Ashrams (discussion citing Ways of Salvation)". Scribd..)

=== Books edited by Kunnumpuram ===
- Kunnumpuram, K. (ed.) (2016). The Vision of a New Church and a New Society: A Scholarly Assessment of Dr. Samuel Rayan’s Contribution to Indian Christian Theology. New Delhi: Christian World Imprints.
- Kunnumpuram, K. (ed.) (2013). Mission of the Church: Selected Writings of Samuel Rayan, S.J. Mumbai: St Pauls (Vol. II).(2012). In Spirit and Truth: Selected Writings of Samuel Rayan, S.J. Mumbai: St Pauls (Vol. II).
- Kunnumpuram, K. (ed.) (2012). Blood and Tears: Interdisciplinary Studies on Religion and Violence. Mumbai: St Pauls.
- Kunnumpuram, K. (ed.) (2010). Jesus: The Relevance of His Person and Message for Our Times: Selected Writings of Samuel Rayan, S.J. Mumbai: St Pauls (Vol. I).
- Kunnumpuram, K. (ed.) (2008). Force, Fraud or Free Choice: Interdisciplinary Perspectives on Conversion. Mumbai: St Pauls.
- Kunnumpuram, K. (ed.) (2007). World Peace: An Impossible Dream? Mumbai: St Pauls.
- Kunnumpuram, K.; Chennattu, R. (eds.) (2007). Indian Church of the Future. Mumbai: St Pauls.
- Kunnumpuram, K. (ed.) (2006). The Eucharist and Life: Indian Christian Reflections on the Lord’s Supper. Mumbai: St Pauls.
- Kunnumpuram, K. (ed.) (2006). Shaping Tomorrow’s Church: Formation of Priests and Religious for India. Mumbai: St Pauls.

=== Festschrifts for Kunnumpuram ===
- Pandikattu, K.; Rocha, R. (eds.) (2003). Bend without Fear: Hopes and Possibilities for an Indian Church: Essays in Honour of Professor Kurien Kunnumpuram SJ. New Delhi: ISPCK.
- Rocha, R.; Pandikattu, K. (eds.) (2002). Dreams and Visions: New Horizons for an Indian Church: Essays in Honour of Professor Kurien Kunnumpuram SJ. Pune: Jnana Deepa, Institute of Philosophy and Theology.
