= Meenachil =

- Taluk
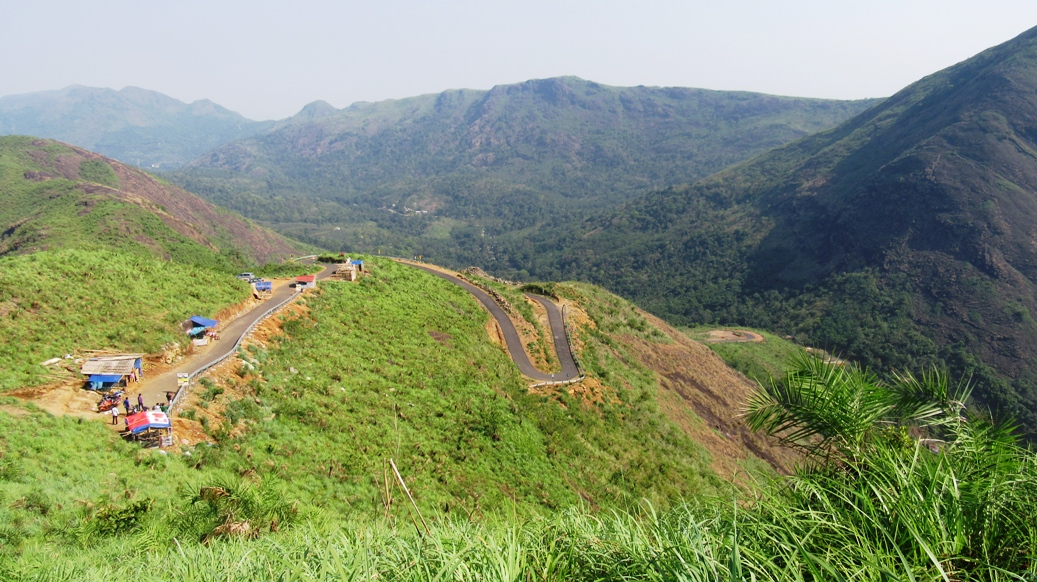
- Illikkal Rock
- Interactive map of Meenachil
- Coordinates: 9.7°N 76.70°E
- Country: India
- State: Kerala
- District: Kottayam

Languages
  - Official: Malayalam, English
- Time zone: UTC+5:30 (IST)
- Vehicle registration: KL-35

Meenachil is the north-eastern region of Kottayam district in Kerala, South India. The name originates from Meenakshi, the Hindu Goddess. Pala is the main city in Meenachil. The arterial river of the district is also named Meenachil.

== Geography ==
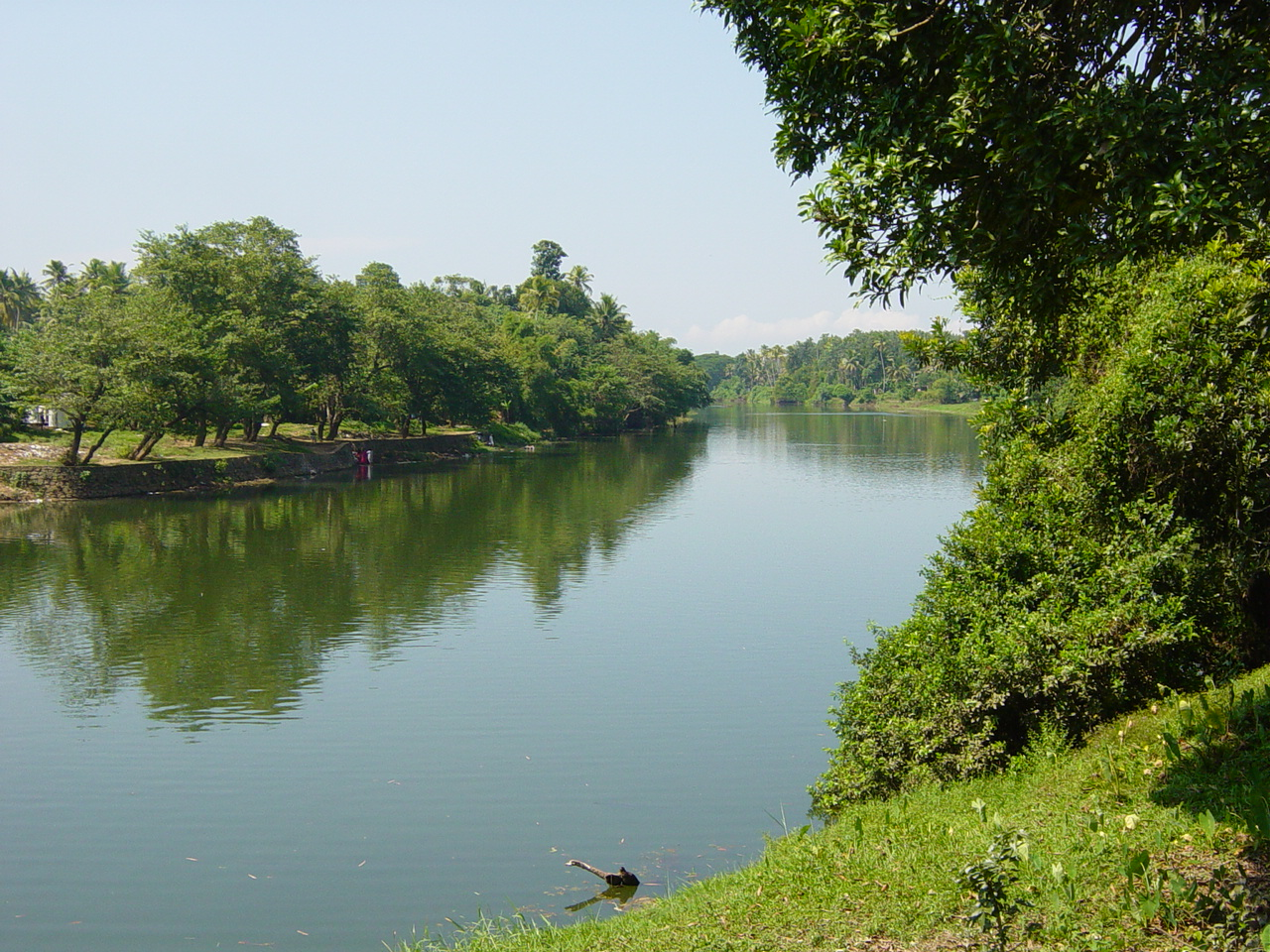
Meenachil River

The Meenachil River, also known as Kavanar, Gauna, Valanjar originates at vagamon in the Western Ghats of Kerala, flows westward through Erattupetta, Palai, Kidangoor, Ettumanoor and Kottayam. Its length is about 87 kilometers. Near Kottayam it splits into a number of distributaries before emptying into the Vembanad Lake. Kumarakom, the bird sanctuary and tourist resort is on one such branch.

== History ==
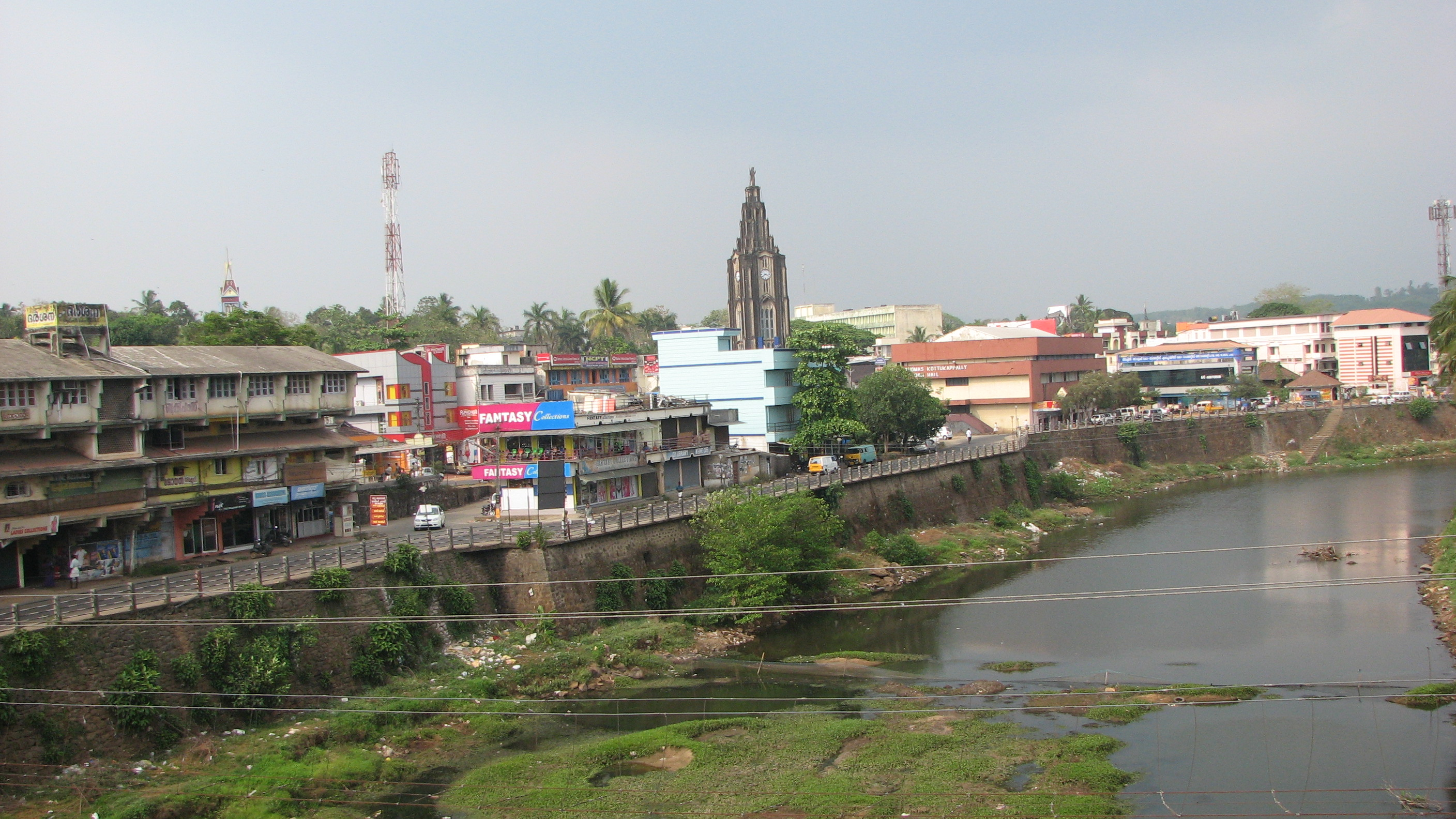
Palai city on the banks of Meenachil river

The current Meenachil taluk was a principality under the rulers of the royal family often referred to as the Meenachil Karthas (also known as Njavakkat Karthas) before Marthanda Varma annexed it to Travancore in 1754. The name of the place comes from Goddess Meenakshi, the deity of the Karthas. Veera Kerala Damodara Simhar was a chieftain belonging to this family. The southern bank of the river was the kingdom of Thekkumkoor, the capital of which was Changanassery, and the northern bank, that of Vadakkumkoor, with its capital at Kaduthuruthy. The Poonjar royal family also held sway over significant areas of the district towards the east.

== Economy ==
Though food crops like paddy and tapioca are cultivated, majority of the population depends on cash crops like rubber and black pepper for income. Turmeric, ginger, cardamom, aracanut, coconut, nutmeg, clove, karuva pattai, jackfruit, tamarind where cultivated here.Recently people had diversified into the cultivation of vanilla on account of the sudden spurt in prices. However, with rubber prices ruling high and vanilla prices nosediving, the original agricultural pattern is seen reemerging. Though there are families with considerable wealth, a large section of the population are farmers with small and medium agricultural holdings.

The Kerala Government has recently (2006) accorded high priority to the implementation of the Meenachil River Valley Project. The project aims at diverting excess water from the Moovattupuzha river into the Meenachil River basin by constructing a tunnel from Arakkulam to Melukavu. Once implemented the project will help in increasing the availability of water in the area.

== Festivals ==
Some of the important festivals celebrated in the region are:
1. Kumaranalloor Thrikarthika
2. The Katappattor temple festival (April)
3. Meenachil Kavu Festival (December)
4. Pala Jubilee thirunal (8 December)
5. The Cherpunkal Church festival(25 December – 2 January)
6. The festival of St. George's Church, Aruvithura
7. The Paika Church festival (19 December)
8. Pala Rakkuly thirunal - Epiphany (7 Jan)
9. Bharanganam Sr Alphonsa's feast (28 July)
10. Bharanganam Sreekrishna Swami temple festival (January–February)
11. Poovarany Mahadeva temple festival (January–February)
12. Ramapuram church feast
13. Kidangoor Temple Festival
14. Edappady Subrahmanya Swamy Temple festival (January–February)
15. Edappady Vazhanekkavu Devi Temple festival (March)
16. Uzhavoor Church feast
17. Vilakkumadom St. Francis Church feast
18. The Arattu at Lalam Sree Mahadeva Temple. (January)
19. Prathista dinam at Puthuppallil Kottaram Bhagavathy Temple at Edamattom (23rd Thulam)
20. Meenachil Nadeethada Hindu Maha sangamam (Jannuvay 12-18)
21. Payappar sree dharama sastha temple (makaravilaku 14 January)
22. Payappar sree dharama sastha temple (makaravilaku 14 January)
23. Edanattukavu Bhagavathy Temple festival (December and March)

== Politics ==
Traditionally, the region is the hotbed of various factions of the Kerala Congress. However mainstream parties like the Indian National Congress, Communist Party of India (Marxist), Communist Party of India, NCP (Nationalist Congress Party) Bharatiya Janata Party also have significant following. The prices of rubber and other agricultural prices determine the agenda of many elections. It is alleged that the church influences the political agenda significantly.

== Notable people ==
- Jose Panachippuram, associate editor, Malayala Manorama daily.

== Transport ==
Meenachil Taluk does not have rail connectivity. The nearest major railway stations are Kottayam, 28 km and Ernakulam junction, 64 km from palai. The nearest airport is the Cochin International Airport at Nedumbassery, 85 km from Palai.

The Ettumanoor - Poonjar State Highway (SH 32) traverses across the Taluk in the easterly direction connecting Kidangoor, Cherpunkal, Palai, Bharananganam, Kondoor, Panackapalam and Erattupetta. In the north- south direction, the Main Eastern Highway (Muvattupuzha - Punalur- SH 8)passes through Kollappally, Palai and Paika. The Erattupetta - Peerumedu State Highway (SH 14) passes through Teekoy and Wagamon. The Sabarimala - Kodaikanal Highway passes through Erattupetta. The Main Central Road (SH 1) from Trivandrum to Angamaly passes through the western boundary of the Taluk.

== Major Colleges ==
- Alphonsa College, Palai (for girls)
- St. George College, Aruvithura
- College of Engineering, Poonjar
- Devamatha College, Kuravilangad
- St Joseph College of Engineering and Technology, Palai (SJCET Palai)
- St. Stephen's College, Uzhavoor
- St. Thomas College, Palai
- BVM Holy Cross College, Cherpunkal
- Government Polytechnic College, Pala
- Henry Baker College, Melukau
- Mar Augusthinose College, Ramapuram (MAC)
- Mar Sleeva College of Nursing, Palai
- MES College Erattupetta, Thidanadu

== See also ==
- Meenachil (village)
- Uzhavoor
