= Moonilavu =

Moonnilavu
- village
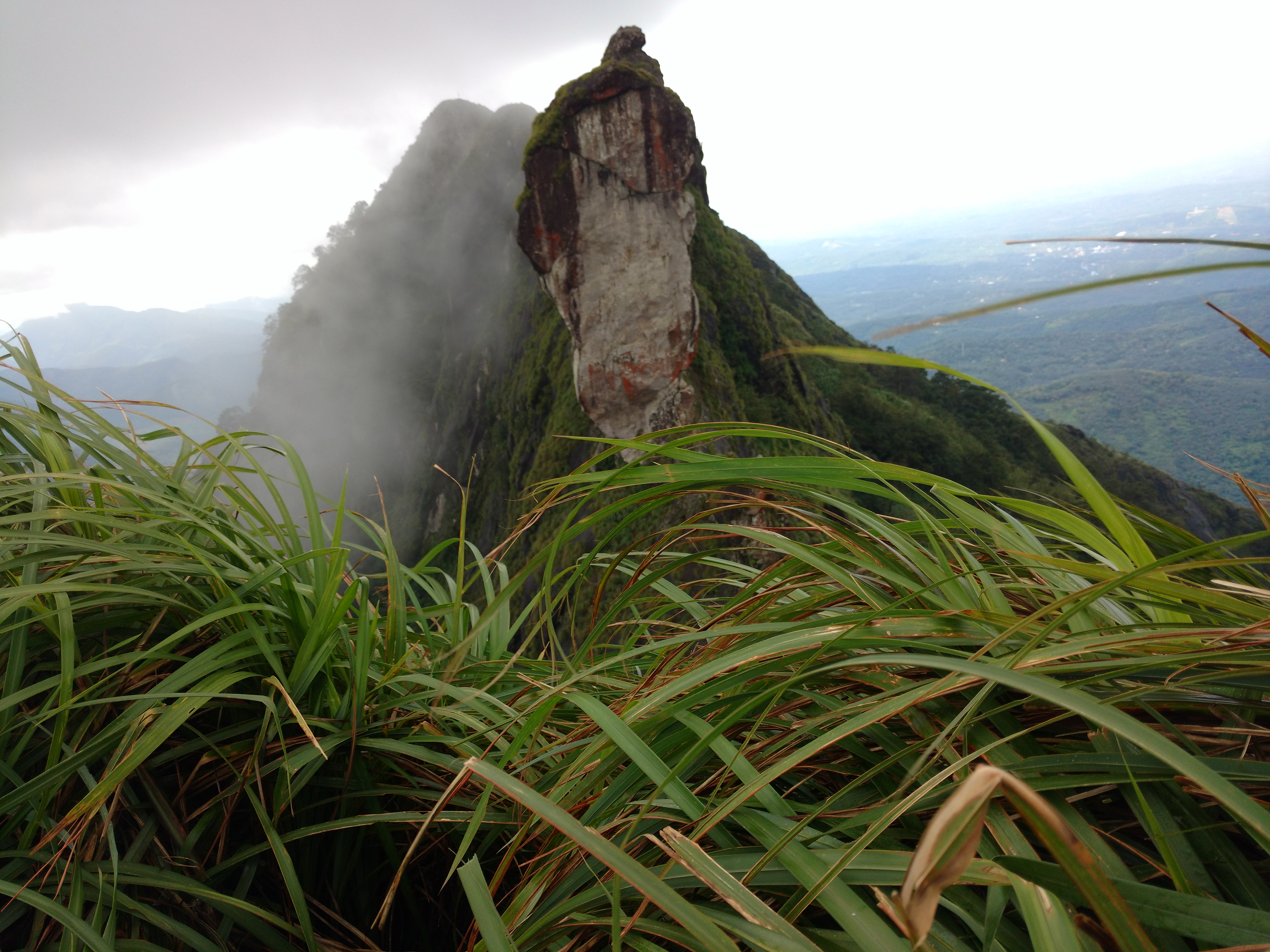
- Illikal rock
- Interactive map of Moonnilavu
- Country: India
- State: Kerala
- District: Kottayam

Government
  - Type: Panchayat
  - Body: Moonilavu grama panchayath

Area
  - Total: 33.41 km^{2} (12.90 sq mi)

Population (2011)
  - Total: 9,213
  - Density: 275.8/km^{2} (714.2/sq mi)

Languages
  - Official: Malayalam, English
- Time zone: UTC+5:30 (IST)
- Postal code: 686586
- Vehicle registration: KL-35
- Literacy: 97%

Moonnilavu is a village in Kottayam district in the state of Kerala, India. As of 2011 India census, Moonnilavu had a population of 9213 with 4654 males and 4559 females.
