= Paika =

- Town
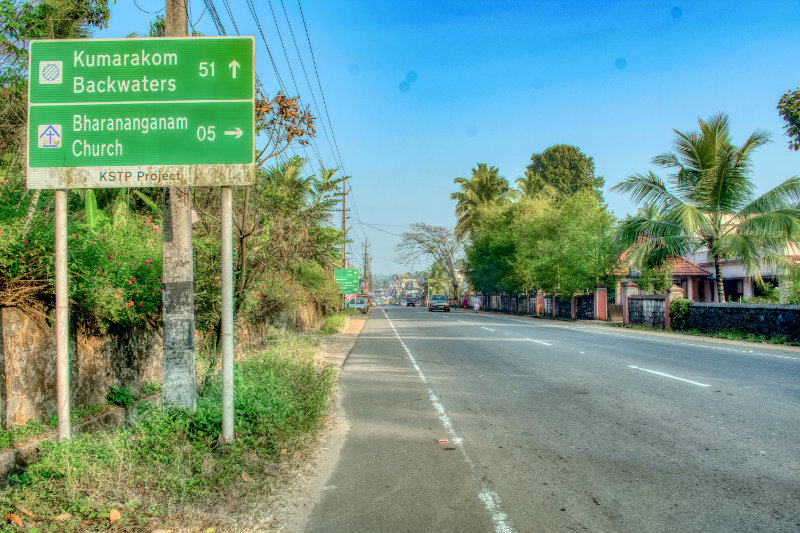
- Interactive map of Paika
- Coordinates: 9°39′0″N 76°43′0″E
- Country: India
- State: Kerala
- District: Kottayam

Population
  - Total: 8,978

Languages
  - Official: Malayalam, English
- Time zone: UTC+5:30 (IST)
- Vehicle registration: KL-35
- Nearest city: Kottayam, Palai, Kanjirappally
- Lok Sabha constituency: Kottayam

Paika is a small town 8 kilometres (5.0 mi) from Palai on the Pala-Ponkunnam road of Muvattupuzha - Punalur SH:08, in Kottayam district, Kerala, India. It is part of Meenachil Taluka, known as one of the most fertile agricultural regions of Travancore. This region is part of the mid-lands (adjacent to the high ranges) of south-eastern Kerala. The main income is from agriculture, mostly rubber plantations.
