= Kondoor =

- village
- Location in Kerala, India Kondoor (India)
- Coordinates: 9.685559°N 76.762183°E
- Country: India
- State: Kerala
- District: Kottayam

Population (2011)
  - Total: 20,510

Languages
  - Official: Malayalam, English
- Time zone: UTC+5:30 (IST)
- Vehicle registration: KL-

Kondoor is a village in Kottayam district in the state of Kerala, India.

Kondoor village is located near to Erattupetta. There is a national library, and some shops in the village.

== Demographics ==
As of 2011 India census, Kondoor had a population of 20510 with 10216 males and 10294 females.
