= Ramapuram =

Ramapuram ("City of Rama") may refer to several places in India:

== Andhra Pradesh ==
- Ramapuram mandal, Annamayya district
  - Ramapuram, Annamayya district, a village in the mandal
- Ramapuram, Kanaganapalli, Anantapur district, a village
- Ramapuram, Krishna district, a village
- Ramapuram, Nellore district, a census village

== Kerala ==
- Ramapuram, Alappuzha, a village
- Ramapuram, Kottayam, a town
  - Saint Augustine's Forane Church, Ramapuram
  - Ramapuram Sree Rama Temple
- Ramapuram, Malappuram, a town

== Tamil Nadu ==
- Ramapuram, Chennai, a neighbourhood
- Ramapuram, Cuddalore, a revenue village
- Ramapuram, Kanyakumari, a census village
- Ramapuram, Thanjavur, a village

== Telangana ==
- Ramapuram, Nalgonda district, a village and Gram panchayat

== Uttar Pradesh ==
- Ayodhya, a city said to have been ruled by Rama

== See also ==
- Rampur (disambiguation), also means "City of Rama"
- Ramapura (disambiguation)
