= Rampur =

Rampur may refer to:

== Places ==
=== India ===
- Ayodhya (Ramayana), a city in India, said to have been ruled by Rama
- Rampur State, a princely state of British India

==== Uttar Pradesh ====
- Rampur, Uttar Pradesh, a city
  - Rampur district
  - Rampur (Assembly constituency)
  - Rampur (Lok Sabha constituency)
  - Rampur Junction railway station
- Rampur, Jaunpur district
- Rampur, Amawan, Raebareli district
- Rampur, Asoha, Unnao district
- Ramapur, Azamgarh district
- Rampur Baghel, Raebareli district
- Rampur Barara, Raebareli district
- Rampur Khurd, Raebareli district
- Rampur Sudauli, Raebareli district

==== Elsewhere in India ====
- Rampur, Kamrup, Assam
- Rampur, Bihar
- Rampur Samastipur, Bihar
- Rampur (Chhattisgarh Vidhan Sabha constituency), Chhattisgarh
- Rampur, Kheda district, Gujarat
- Rampur, Himachal Pradesh
  - Rampur (Himachal Pradesh Assembly constituency)
- Rampur, Jharkhand
- Rampur, Karnataka
- Ramapur, Vijayapur Taluk, Bijapur district, Karnataka
- Rampur, Dahanu (census code 551582), Palghar district, Maharashtra
- Rampur, Dahanu (census code 551636), Palghar district, Maharashtra
- Rampur, Jalandhar, Punjab
- Rampur, Shahkot, Jalandhar, Punjab
- Rampur, SBS Nagar, Punjab
- Rajouri, formerly Rampur, city in Jammu and Kashmir, India

=== Nepal ===
- Rampur, Chitwan, Bagmati Pradesh
- Rampur, Dang, Lumbini Pradesh
- Rampur, Ramechhap, Bagmati Pradesh
- Rampur, Palpa, Lumbini Pradesh

=== Pakistan ===
- Rampur, Lahore, Punjab

=== Bangladesh ===
- Rampur Boalia, Old name for Rajshahi

== People ==
- Gurcharan Rampuri (1929–2018), Indian-born Canadian poet from Rampur, Ludhiana
- Baba Rampuri (born 1950), American ascetic, settled in Rampur, India

== See also ==
- Rampuri, Indian gravity knife from Rampur, Uttar Pradesh
- Rampuri cap, Indian hat from Rampur, Uttar Pradesh
- Rampur Baghelan, a town in Madhya Pradesh, India
  - Rampur-Baghelan (Vidhan Sabha constituency)
- Rampur Birta (disambiguation)
- Rampura (disambiguation)
- Ramapuram (disambiguation)
- Rampurwa (disambiguation)
- Ranpur (disambiguation)
- Ramnagar (disambiguation)
