= Nellikutty =

Village in Kerala, India

Nellikutty is a small hamlet in Kannur district in Kerala, India, resting on the lap of the Western Ghat in India. The modern history of this village starts with the arrival of migrants from Ramapuram, Kottayam District of Kerala during the 1930s. The hard work of the migrants made Nellikutty a town with almost all the facilities to meet the basic needs of its population.

== History ==
The History of Nellikutty began with coming of migrants from Kottayam. From there onwards, many new families came and settled in Nellikutty. Now around 600 families are living here. Nellikutty is a small village area. Most people here in Nellikutty are farmers, who work hard for their daily needs. Rubber is the main agricultural product in here.

== Religion ==
The majority of people are Christians especially Syro Malabar Roman Catholics. St Augustine's Church is the parish of Nellikutty. Zion Retreat Centre is an important retreat center in Nellikutty, run by MSMI congregation of Catholic sisters. near it.

== Economy ==
The economic mainstay of Nelikutty is agriculture. The main crops grown are rubber, coconut, pepper, cashew, tapioca, arecanut, and other plantation crops. Rubber prices' recent increases have improved the economic condition of many local families.

== Education ==
St. Augustine's High School and Gandhi Memorial Upper primary school are the main educational institutions in Nellikutty. It was founded in 1964 by the Parish of Nellikutty as a fulfillment of the wish of the migrant fathers. The school was managed by the parish of Nellikutty. But later, the Diocese started a Corporate Educational Agency and the school became a part of it. As of today, there is a network of government schools, corporate schools and CBSE schools in and around Nellikutty. The school ended up winning most of the prizes from different competitions. The school management has now bought a school bus, and has appointed Saju Thalamplackal as the driver, and the door checker is Googly.

With the setting up of Vimaljyothi Engineering College in Jyothinagar Chemperi (previously known as Chalimparamba) in 2002, the unemployment has increased.

== Transport ==
Nellikutty has roads connecting to Chemperi and Eattupara Chandanakampara. Hill Highway, the prestigious road of Kerala is just 2km from Nellikutty.

The national highway passes through Taliparamba town. Goa and Mumbai can be accessed on the northern side and Cochin and Thiruvananthapuram can be accessed on the southern side. Taliparamba has a good bus station and buses are easily available to all parts of Kannur district. The road to the east of Iritty connects to Mysore and Bangalore. But buses to these cities are available only from Kannur, 22 km to the south. The nearest railway stations are Kannapuram and Kannur on Mangalore-Palakkad line. Trains are available to almost all parts of India subject to advance booking over the internet. There are airports at Kannur, Mangalore and Calicut. All of them are small international airports with direct flights available only to Middle Eastern countries.
