= Nirmala Higher Secondary School =

Nirmala Higher Secondary School may refer to:

- Nirmala Higher Secondary School, Chemperi, Kerala, India
- Nirmala Higher Secondary School, Muvattupuzha, Kerala, India
