= Rampurwa =

Rampurwa may refer to:

India

- Rampurwa, Mehsi or Rampur Jetha, East Champaran district, Bihar
- Rampurva capitals, site of certain pillars of Ashoka in West Champaran district, Bihar

Nepal

- Rampurwa, Lumbini
- Rampurwa, Narayani

== See also ==
- Rampur (disambiguation)
