= Rampur Assembly constituency =

Rampur Assembly constituency may refer to:

- Rampur, Assam Assembly constituency, see 1957 Assam Legislative Assembly election and 1962 Assam Legislative Assembly election
- Rampur, Chhattisgarh Assembly constituency
- Rampur, Himachal Pradesh Assembly constituency
- Rampur, Uttar Pradesh Assembly constituency

== See also ==
- Rampur (disambiguation)
