= List of educational institutions in Taliparamba =

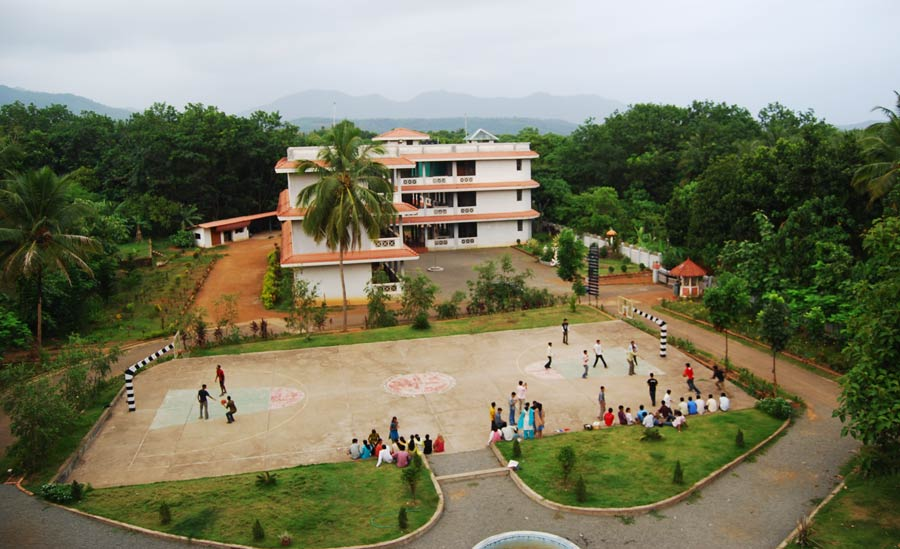
Vimal Jyothi Engineering College, Chemperi

Taliparamba (Perimchellur) is an area that is part of Kannur district of Kerala state, south India.

== Major educational organizations ==
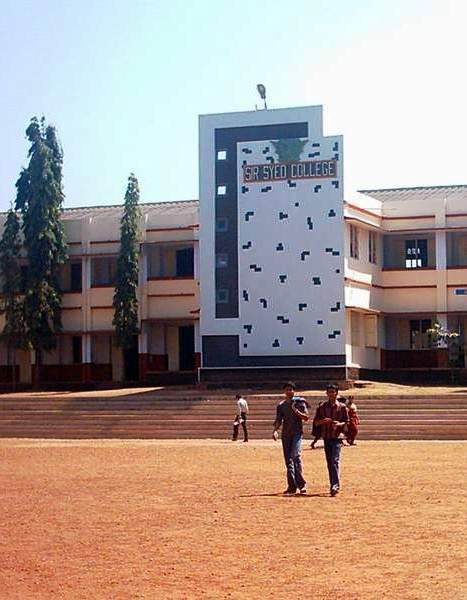
Sir Syed College, Taliparamba

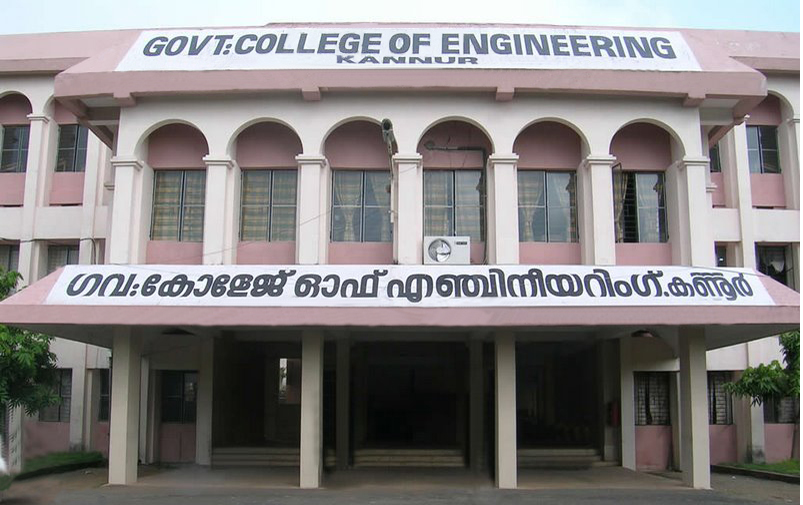
Govt. College of Engineering near Taliparamba

- National Institute of Fashion Technology Kannur
- Government College of Engineering, Kannur
- Pariyaram Medical College
- Vimal Jyothi Engineering College, Chemperi
- Sir Syed College, Taliparamba
- Tagore Vidyaniketan Govt HSS, Taliparamba
- Taliparamba Arts and Science College

=== Other schools and colleges ===
- Bharatiya Vidya Bhavan, Taliparamba
- National College, Taliparamba
- Moothedath High School, Taliparamba
- Chinmaya Vidyalaya, Taliparamba
- Seethi Sahib Higher Secondary School

== See also ==
- Taliparamba
