= K. M. Nair =

An Indian geologist and researcher

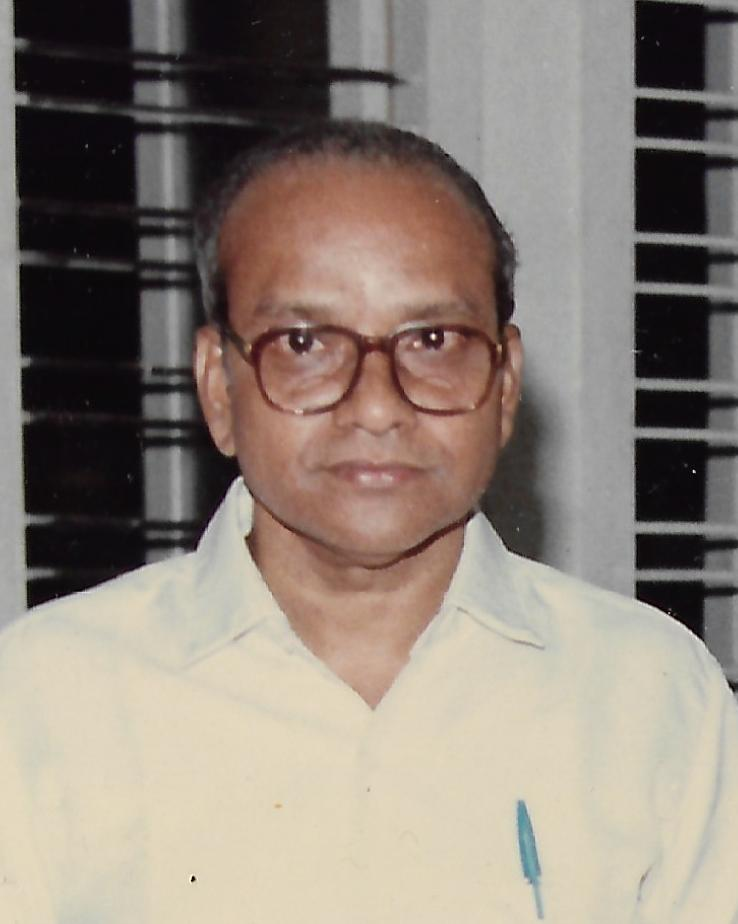
- Born: 13 May 1936; Ramapuram (near Kayamkulam), India
- Died: 2014 (aged 77–78); Kerala, India
- Occupation: Geologist
- Spouse: Saraswathi

K. M. Nair, full name Krishnan Nair Madhavan Nair (13 May 1936 – 2014), was a geoscientist who published over 30 papers. He was passionate about geology and the environment. He spent most of his professional life, as well as his retirement, in conducting research and initiating studies relating to the environment.

== Biography ==
=== Early life ===
He was born in Ramapuram (near Kayamkulam), Kerala, and was the last among his five siblings from the ancestral home of Asanparambil. He received his Master of Science in Geology from Jammu University in 1958 and Ph.D. from Osmania University in 1977. The dissertation topic for his Ph.D. was Sedimentology of Carbonates in Cauvery Basin.

=== Professional life ===
During his early career, he worked as a petroleum exploration geologist in Kerala, Assam, West Bengal, Gujarat, Andhra Pradesh, and Tamil Nadu. In 1980, he moved to Nigeria where he worked as a lecturer in the University of Ilorin and also took part in geoscience research work. He then worked as a United Nations Development Programme (UNDP) Sedimentary Petroghraper advising the government of Belize (Central America) in 1984.

He returned to India in 1988 and joined Oil and Natural Gas Corporation (ONGC) as a Chief Geologist. He was involved in the study of Western Offshore Sedimentary Basins during his term.

In 1992, he became the Director of National Centre for Earth Science Studies (NCESS), Trivandrum. He initiated research programs such as river basin studies with a focus on sand mining, and Environmental Impact Assessment (EIA) of Pampa Irrigation Project. He was also involved in studies of seismology, and landslides and coastal areas.

Between 1998 and 2009, he was a full-time environmental researcher and implemented projects such as:

- Quaternary Sea Level Oscillations, Geological and Geomorphological Evolution of South Kerala Sedimentary Basin, funded by Department of Science and Technology (DST).
- Integrated Hydrogeological Investigations and Multi-Pronged Water Conservation in Selected Watersheds of Achankovil River Basin, Kerala, funded by Rajiv Gandhi National Drinking Water Mission.

He then became the Director, Vakkom Moulavi Foundation Trust, where he initiated research projects such as:

- Effects of Holocene Tectonics, Sea level, and Climate Changes on Landforms and Vegetation in South Kerala Sedimentary Basin, funded by Kerala State Council for Science, Technology and Environment (KSCSTE).
- Tectonic and Hydrologic Control on Late Pleistocene-Holocene Landforms, Paleoforest, and non-forest vegetation; Southern Kerala, funded by Kerala State Council for Science, Technology, and Environment (KSCSTE).
- Late Quaternary Environmental changes in the coastal plains of Southern Kerala, funded by Council of Scientific and Industrial Research (CSIR).

After retirement, he continued his passion for research and implemented projects such as:

- Attempt to save the Midlands of Kerala from drinking water shortage, funded by Kerala State Council for Science, Technology, and Environment (KSCSTE).
- Paleoclimate and Sea level Records in the Late Quaternary Sediments of Coastal Wetlands of Pallikkal and Achankovil River Basins-Its Implications on Coastal Evolution.
