= Rampura =

Rampura may refer to the following places:

- Rampura, Jalaun, a town in Uttar Pradesh, India
- Rampura, Nagaur, a village in Nawa in Nagaur district, Rajasthan, India
- Rampura, Neemuch, a town in Madhya Pradesh, India
- Rampura State, a former princely state in Mahi Kantha, Gujarat, India
- Rampura Dabri, a village and tehsil in Jaipur Rural district, Rajasthan, India
- Rampura Phul, a town in Bathinda district of Indian Punjab
- Rampura Thana, an administrative division of Dhaka, Bangladesh

== See also ==
- Rampur (disambiguation)
