= Ramapura =

Ramapura may refer to places in India:

- Ayodhya, a city in India, said to have been ruled by Rama
- Ramapura, Chamarajanagar, Karnataka
- Ramapura, Gauribidanur, Karnataka

== See also ==
- Ramapuram (disambiguation)
