= Thevarparampil Kunjachan =

Indian Syro-Malabar Catholic priest

Mar Augustine of Ramapuram
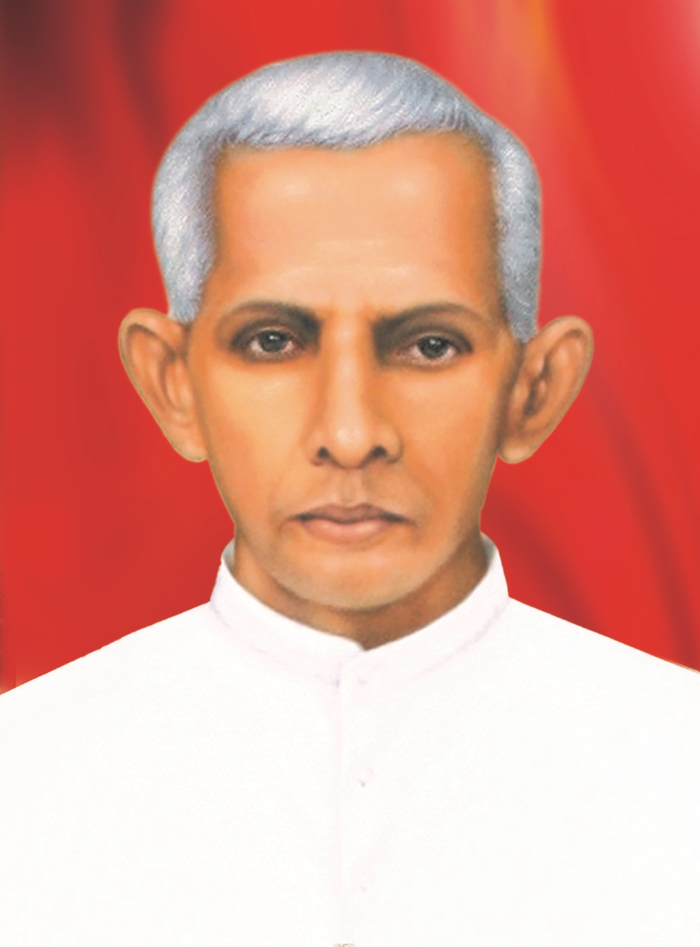

Priest
- Born: 1 April 1891; Ramapuram, Kerala, India
- Died: 16 October 1973 (aged 82); Ramapuram, Kerala, India
- Venerated in: Syro-Malabar Church
- Beatified: 30 April 2006, Ramapuram by Mar Varkey Vithayathil
- Major shrine: Mar Augustine's Forane Church, Ramapuram.
- Feast: 16 October

Thevarparambil Kunjachan (born Augustine Thevarparambil) was an Indian Syro-Malabar Catholic priest who dedicated himself to the spiritual and temporal welfare of marginalized Dalits.

== Early life ==
Augustine was born on 1 April 1891, at Ramapuram in Travancore (present-day Kerala, India). He was the son of Itty Iype and Eliswa of the Thevarparambil clan, a branch of the Kuzhumbil family lineage. He received his primary education at a school sponsored by the government of Travancore and then attended St. Ephrem's School in Mannanam where his religious faith intensified, compelling him to pursue priesthood. After secondary school, he embarked on a journey on foot from Ramapuram to Changanacherry in order to enroll in St. Thomas Minor Seminary. After receiving his major seminary formation at Puthenpally Seminary in Varapuzha, he was ordained as a priest on 16 July 1915.

== Early career ==
After celebrating his first Mass at St. Augustine Church in Ramapuram, his home parish, Augustine resided in his home village for eight years while undergoing practical training. He was known as Kunjachan ("Little Father" in Malayalam) for his short stature. In 1923, Augustine was appointed as assistant vicar to Thomas Kuzhumpil at St. Sebastian Church in Kadanad.

During his vocation in Kadanad, Kunjachan was often approached by the local villagers, who relied on his advice and blessings for their agricultural yield. Kunjachan would sprinkle holy water on crops, ensuring a plentiful harvest. An illness forced Kunjachan to return to Ramapuram.

== Missionary work ==
In Ramapuram, Kunjachan witnessed a group of people deprived of dignity, respect, and the basic necessities of life. He would devote his entire life to the uplifting of the downtrodden. It is the singular achievement of Kunjachan that he had been able to convert by himself no less than 5,000 Dalits (earlier the term 'Harijan' was used). He is to be counted as one of the foremost missionaries among the Dalits in India. In fact, he neither made use of eloquent sermons nor of any human techniques in order to give them the "Christ" of whom he was the herald. He preached with his works, and practising charity.

Kunjachan led a very simple life for the poor and wished to be with them even after death. He spent everything he had for the poor. The Blessed who was a priest for more than 50 years, wrote in his Testament: "I do not possess anything either as landed property or as cash account... After my death, my funeral must be conducted in the most simple way. Ever since 1926, I had been staying with the Harijan (Dalit) Christians. Even after death, I would like to be with them. Therefore my dead body should be buried where the Harijan Christians are buried".

== Death ==
After a brief period of serious illness Kunjachan died on 16 October 1973 at the age of 82. At his death the children and others told that "a saint has passed away". At his funeral the priest who preached the panegyric, spoke well of his holiness in life, apostolic zeal, kindness of heart, love for the poor and other outstanding virtues; towards the end of the speech he said, "we are participating in the funeral of a saint. We have one more mediator in heaven."

Kunjachan had the reputation of a holy man even while he was alive. People irrespective of caste and religion, used to approach him in their manifold needs and they got favors through his prayers and blessings. Within a few days after his death his tomb at Ramapuram became a center of pilgrimage for people from far and wide.

== Beatification and canonization ==
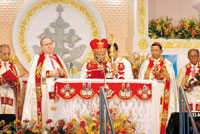
Beatified by Varkey Vithayathil, Major Archbishop of the Syro-Malabar Church on 30 April 2006. Participated by Papal Nuncio to India Archbishop Pedro Lopez Quintana and Cardinal Telesphore Toppo, President of the Catholic Bishops Conference of India (CBCI).

The process of beatification and canonization started on 11 August 1987 at Ramapuram, bestowing upon him the title, 'Servant of God'. The 'Positio super vita et virtutibus' was completed after ten years and was submitted at the Congregation for the Causes of Saints on 12 February 1997. The 'positio' on the heroic practice of virtues of the saintly priest was approved by Pope John Paul II on 22 June 2004 and he was declared 'The Venerable'.

Meanwhile, the process of the miraculous cure of the clubfoot of a boy, Gilson Varghese, was undertaken, and the findings were sent to Rome for consideration. After a thorough investigation of the miraculous nature of the cure, made by personnel in Rome, Pope Benedict XVI approved it, opening the way for beatification. Kunjachan was beatified by Cardinal Varkey Vithayathil, Major Archbishop of the Syro-Malabar Church on 30 April 2006 at the very same village Ramapuram where he was born, worked, died and buried.

The Papal Nuncio to India Archbishop Pedro López Quintana, Cardinal Telesphore Toppo, President of the Catholic Bishops Conference of India (CBCI), and other bishops and priests participated in the ceremony.

The Feast of Blessed Kunjachan is celebrated on 16 October every year.

Kunjachan had his last times at family house Thervarparampil Ramapuram.
