= Paisakari =

Village in Kannur District, Kerala, India

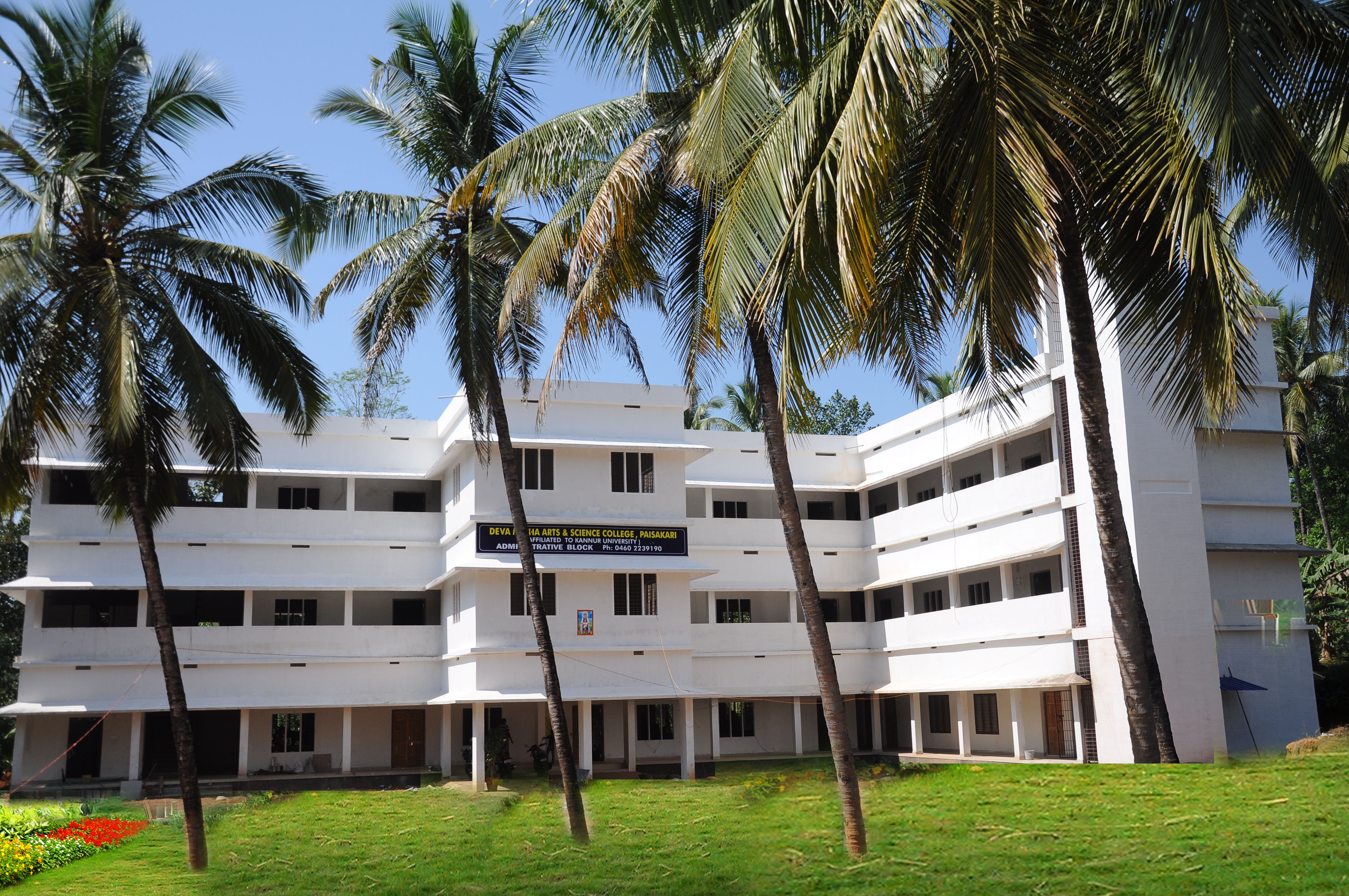
Devamatha College

Paisakari is a village town located in the western ghats bordering Kerala and Karnataka, in Payyavoor Panchayath. Atypical of places share the socio-economic and geographic similarities, Paisakari is home to many educational institutions natured under the Church centric educational board and attracts students from the various parts of Kannur district, where it belongs.

== History and overview ==
The name Paisakkary is thought to have evolved from Pazhassi Kari, a name associated with the Guerrilla freedom fighter, Kerala varma Pazhassi Raja. Before the Independence of India, Paisakari, mostly forest land then, was under the reign of the land lord Nayanar family and had a very small population indigenous to it. Post Second World War, The Malabar migration of Syrian Christians started and Paisakari became one of the early destinations for the Travancore bound migrants.

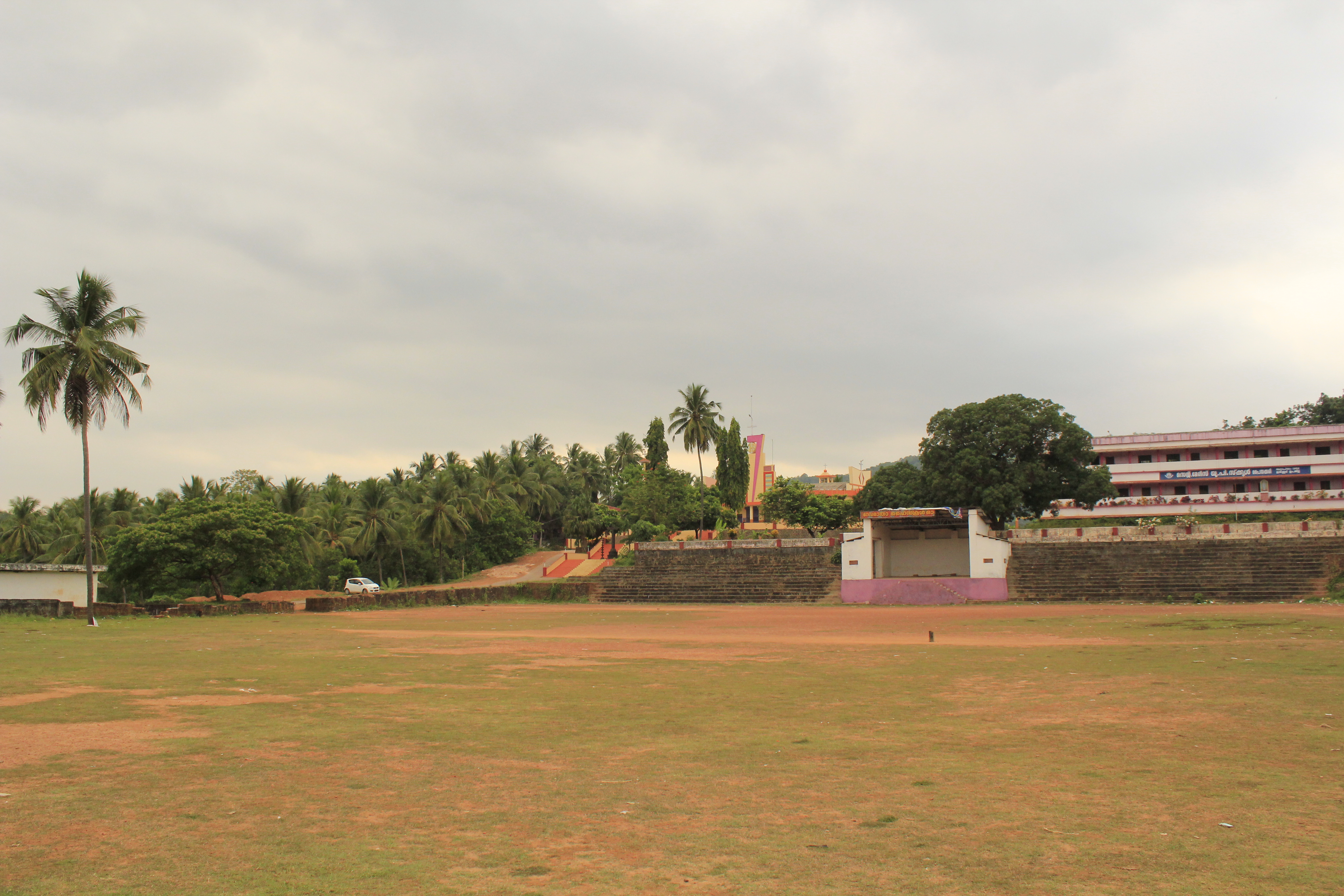
Panoramic view of the Devamatha church and St. Mary's U.P school onlooking the school ground and the stadium.

As the population built up, more and more forest land surrounding the area was converted into fertile agricultural land for cash crops and because of the high density of Christians, Thalasseri diocese decided to set up a parish here in 1949. Since then, the church has been the epicentre of developments and educational establishments in the area. Currently it has elevated to a Forane church and has strength of more than 1000 families and the total population growing to the north of 6000.

Church The main attraction of Paisakary is Devamatha church. People living in this village with peace and harmony.

== Educational Institutions ==
Paisakari has the following institutions/ establishments to its credit:

1. St. Mary's L.P school
2. St. Mary's U.P school
3. Devamatha High school
4. Devamatha Higher secondary school
5. Devamatha Arts and Science College.
6. Bhagavathpatha ITC

== Transportation ==
Paisakari is well connected to the other areas and en route to the famous muthappan pilgrimage centre, Kunnathoor Padi. Buses ply between Chandanakkampara and Talipparamba go through Paisakari and the mass population depend on them largely. It is also accessible from Chemperi via Ettupara, which forms an alternate route. The national highway passes through Taliparamba town. Goa and Mumbai can be accessed on the northern side and Cochin and Thiruvananthapuram can be accessed on the southern side. Taliparamba has a good bus station and buses are easily available to all parts of Kannur district. The road to the east of Iritty connects to Mysore and Bangalore. But buses to these cities are available only from Kannur, 22 km to the south. The nearest railway stations are Kannapuram and Kannur on Mangalore-Palakkad line. Trains are available to almost all parts of India subject to advance booking over the internet. There are airports at Kannur, Mangalore and Calicut. All of them are small international airports with direct flights available only to Middle Eastern countries.
