= Saint Augustine's Forane Church, Ramapuram =

Ramapuram church
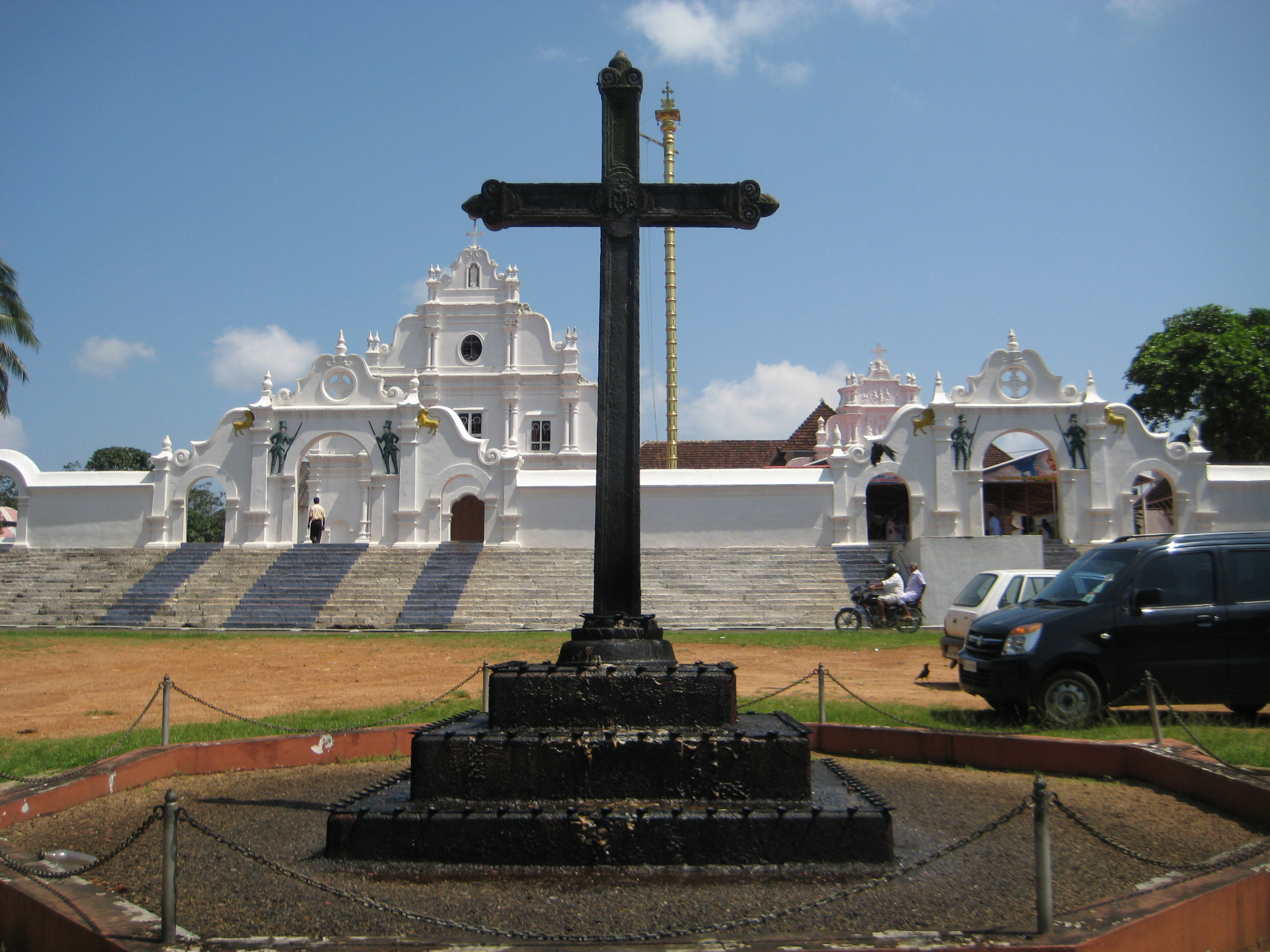

- Location within Kerala
- 9.7963542°N 76.6600227°E
- Location: Ramapuram, Kottayam district, Kerala
- Country: India
- Denomination: Catholic Church
- Sui iuris church: Syro-Malabar Church

History
- Founded: St. Augustine church, 1450; 576 years ago St. Mary church, 1864; 162 years ago
- Dedication: Saint Mary, Saint Augustine

Architecture
- Architectural type: Mixed

Administration
- District: Kottayam
- Archdiocese: Palai

Saint Augustine's Forane Church is a Syro-Malabar church complex located in Ramapuram of Kottayam district, Kerala, India. It is one of the most prominent churches in the Eparchy of Palai and is a notable shrine housing the tomb of Thevarparampil Kunjachan. There are currently three church buildings in the same compound of which the oldest one was built in 1450. A second church in the name of Blessed Mary was built in 1864. The two churches and a two-storey building in which the Paremmakkal Thoma Kathanar is said to have lived, is a protected monument of the Archeology Department of the Government of Kerala. A third church was built, to replace the old Augustine's church as the parish church, in 2019. It is one of the largest churches in Asia.

== History ==
The old twin-church complex at Ramapuram had a smaller church dedicated to Saint Augustine and a larger church dedicated to the Blessed Virgin. Among these, the church dedicated to St. Augustine was built around 1450. Archbishop Alexis de Menezes, Archbishop of Goa, took the lead in rebuilding the first church (originally a smaller one named after St. Mary) in the name of St. Augustine, in 1599. The church dedicated to the Blessed Mary was built around 1864. In 1929 St. Augustine church was raised as a Forane Church.

Paremmakal Thomma Katanar, the governor of then Kodungallur, ruled the Syrian Christian community from here and his mortal remains are buried here. Likewise, blessed Thevarparampil Kunjachan's mortal remains are also preserved here.

== Churches in the complex ==
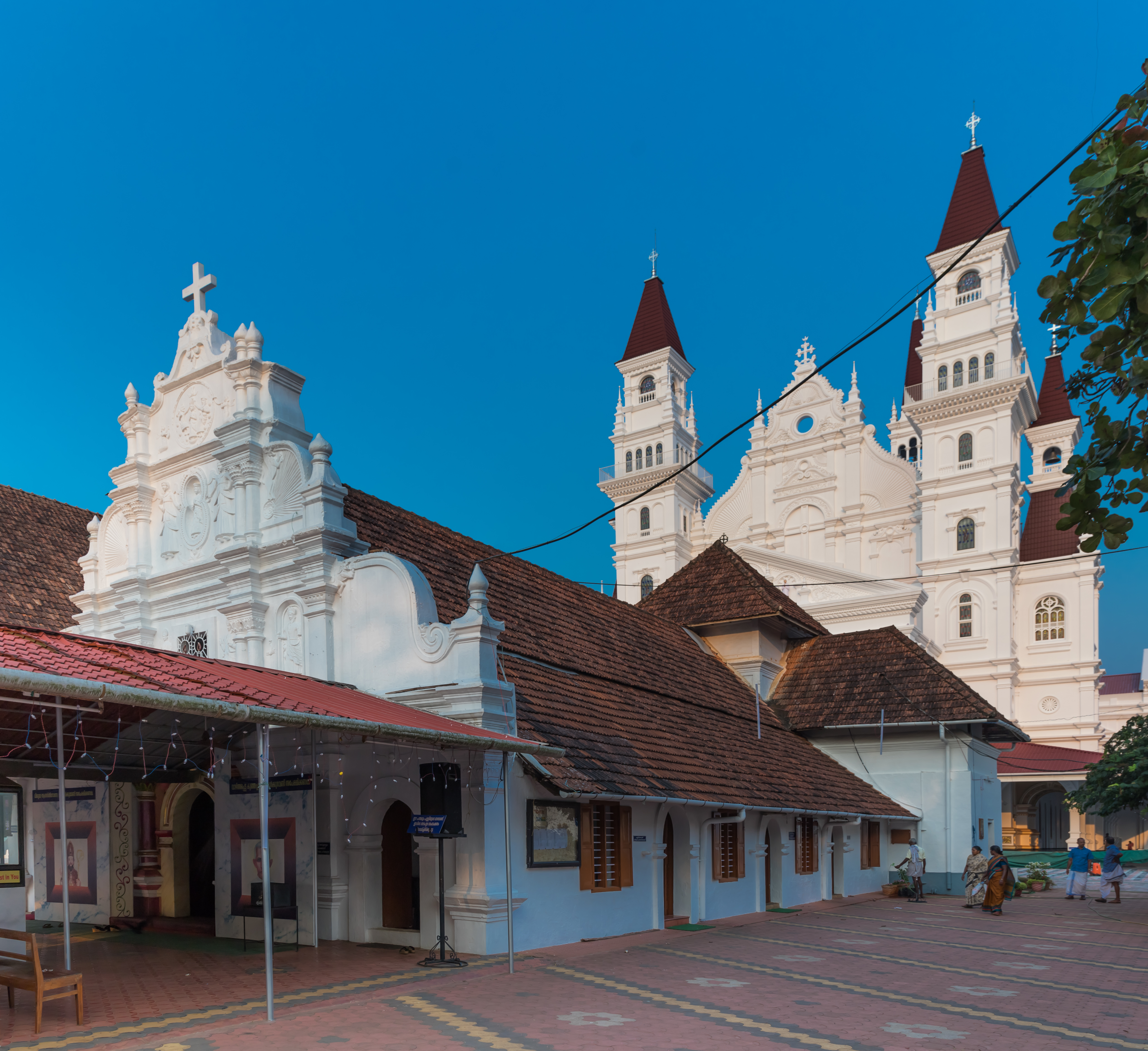
Old St. Augustines Church in front and the newly built church at back

The old twin-church complex had a smaller church dedicated to Saint Augustine and a larger church dedicated to the Blessed Mary. The two churches and a two-storey building in which the Paremmakkal Thoma Kathanar is said to have lived, is a protected monument of the Archeology Department of the Government of Kerala.

The oldest church, St. Augustine's Forane Church was built in 1450 A.D. and the second church in the name of Blessed Mary was built in 1864 A.D. There are more than two thousand families and 13 parishes under St. Augustine's Forane Church.

It is after the government decided to make the two old churches a protected monument and not to demolish them, a new church building is decided to be built in the same compound. The foundation stone was laid in 2009 and work started in 2010. The consecration of the new church took place in January 2019, under the leadership of Cardinals Mar George Alencherry and Climmes Mar Baselius.

The newly built church, is one of the largest churches in Asia. Spread over 70,000 square feet, the three-storey church has a seating capacity of 3,500 people. Of the three floors, the lowest floor houses the museum and rest rooms for pilgrims. On the second floor, there are the offices of all the religious organizations of the church, the media room and the rooms for the priests. It is also where the precious golden cross of the church is kept. On the top floor there is a prayer hall that can accommodate more than 3,500 people. The front of the church is built in Portuguese-Gothic style, and the back is in Byzantine style. The church is 200 feet long and 120 feet wide and has a height of 235 feet.

The gate in front of the church is built in one piece wood. The door is made of 350 year old teak. he construction cost of the church is more than 20 crores.

== Associated rituals ==
There is a ritual of holding a small gold chain with a cross on a plate, and walking around the tall granite cross in front of the church. Similarly, on the feast of Saint George, it is customary to offer chickens and hens in the church, and on the feast of Saint Sebastian, many believers walk around the large cross, carrying a small arrow on a plate, symbolizing the arrows that killed the saint.

Burning candles and oil lamps around the granite cross is another ritual followed even by non-Christians. Some worshipers crawl on their elbows around the tomb of the blessed Thevarparampil Kunjachan.

== Legal status ==
In view of the importance of the two churches and a two-storey building in which the Paremmakkal Thoma Kathanar is said to have lived, the Archeology Department of the Government of Kerala issued a notification in June 2008 declaring them as protected monuments, under the provisions of the Kerala Ancient Monuments and Archaeological Sites and Remains Act, 1969. This notification was upheld by a Single Bench of the Kerala High Court. The Division Bench dismissed the appeal filed by the Parish Vicar against this. In 2009, the final notification of the Kerala government came declaring both the churches as monuments. Subsequently, St. Augustine's Forane Church Vicar George Njarakunnel approached the Supreme Court against the Kerala High Court's decision to protect the churches as protected monuments, but the appeal was directed to maintain the status quo. The case related to this is continuing in the Supreme Court.

A group of people had again approached the Supreme Court seeking permission to demolish the two old churches to provide a better view of the new bigger church building.
