= Eattupara =

Village in Kerala, India

Eattupara is a small village in the eastern hilly region near the Western Ghats in Kannur district of Kerala, India. It is part of Payyavoor Grama Panchayat. The village is located 6 km (3.7 mi) north of Payyavoor and 6 km (3.7 mi) east of Chemperi. It is a pilgrim centre of St. Alphonsa in northern Kerala. The anniversary of Saint Alphonsa's death, which falls on 28 July, is an important day for the devotees. Eattupara and its surrounds are hilly areas and have a lot of vegetation.
