= Vimal Jyothi Engineering College =

Private Engineering college in Kannur

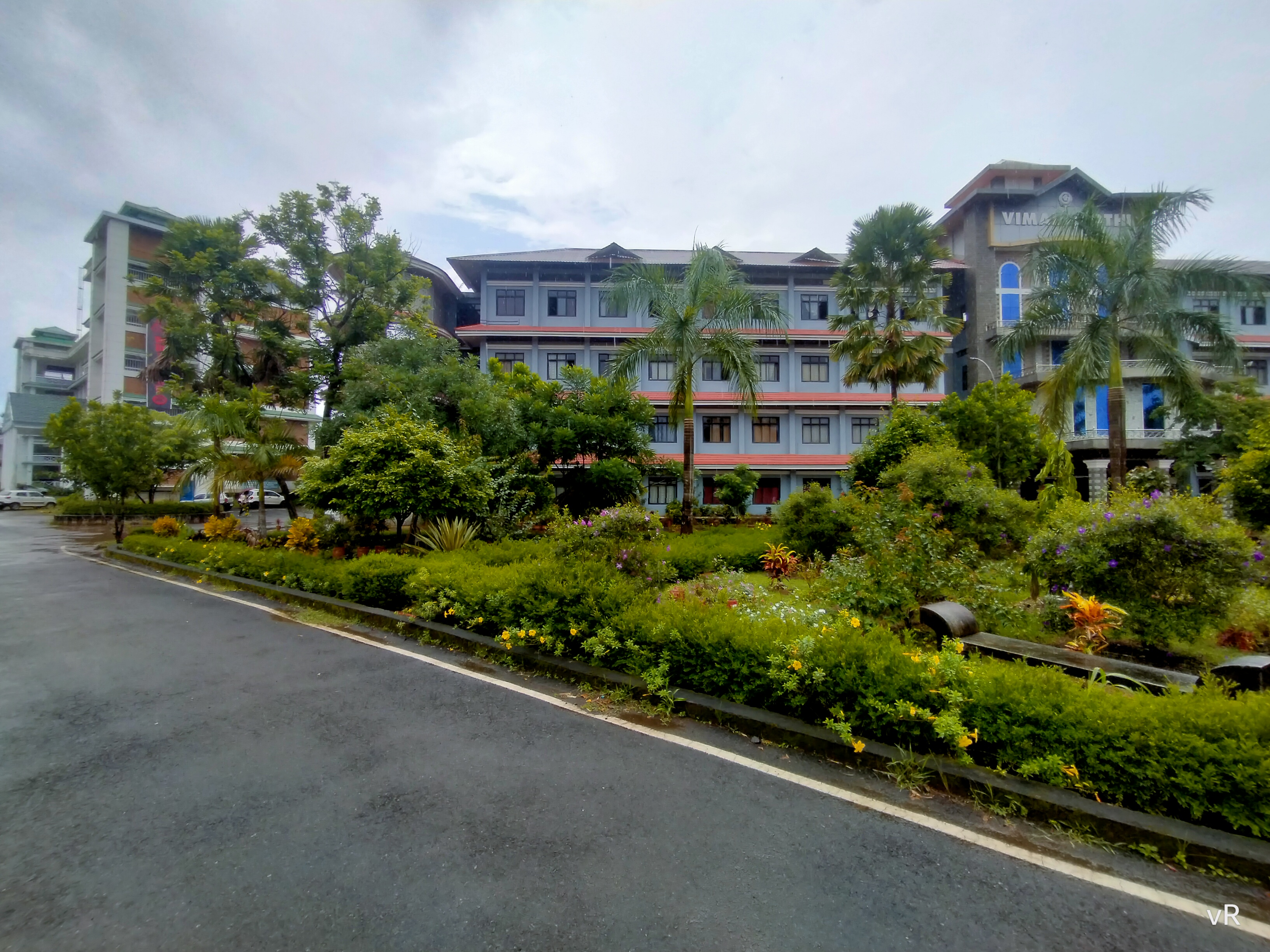
- Vimal Jyothi Engineering College front view
- Motto: योगः कर्मसु कौशलम् (Where Perfection Is The Tradition)
- Type: Private, unaided, Catholic Engineering College
- Established: 2002; 24 years ago
- Affiliations: AICTE, KTU Trivandrum
- Chairperson: Mar. Joseph Pamplany
- President: Mar. George Njaralakattu
- Principal: Dr. Benny Joseph
- Dean: Dr. T D John
- Faculty: 305 (As of July 2017)
- Location: Chemperi, Kannur, Kerala, India
- Website: vjec.ac.in

Vimal Jyothi Engineering College, Chemperi, is a private, unaided, Catholic-minority engineering college in the state of Kerala, India. It was established in 2002 and is run under Catholic supervision with minority rights. This college is managed by The MESHAR Diocesan Educational Trust and the Syro Malabar Archdiocese of Thalassery. It is accredited by the All India Council for Technical Education and affiliated with APJ Abdul Kalam Technological University, Thiruvananthapuram

== Academics ==
The college offers six undergraduate programmes and six postgraduate programmes in engineering.

=== Applied electronics & instrumentation ===
The course B. Tech in Applied Electronics & Instrumentation is under the Department of Electronics & Instrumentation. The department was started in 2005 with an intake of 60 students. The first batch of Applied Electronics and Instrumentation department passed out in 2009. Department won all 3 ranks in the year's 2009, 2010, 2011, 2012 & 2013 from Kannur University. Laboratories under the Department of E&I are Process Control Instrumentation Lab, Industrial Instrumentation Lab, Virtual Instrumentation & Simulation Lab, Applied Electronics Lab & Advanced Digital Lab. For the development of its Students the Department signed an MoU with Yokogawa Industries Ltd. & Technophilia to conduct many training programs. The department publishes a quarterly newsletter, Metron, and has 15 teaching staff members and 3 non-teaching members. In the year 2013, the department began awarding the M.Tech in Control & Instrumentation with an initial cohort of 24 students.

=== Computer science & engineering ===
The first computing programme at Vimal Jyothi Engineering College started in 2002. The department offers an undergraduate programme in computer science & engineering, accredited by AICTE. The center was initially allocated space in the same premises of the administrative blocks.

The first class to graduate in 2005 and Ms.RAHMATH KOMBIL awarded the third rank in university. The center undertook several indigenous efforts to enhance both the software and hardware resources of this college and support the computing needs of the entire college. By 2012 the number of faculty members rose to 14 and the department introduced a postgraduate programme in computer science.

Students of the department are eligible to join the college's Computer Engineering Students Association.

== Admission and fee structure ==
Graduate Level Admission to the college is strictly as per the guidelines given by the Supreme Court of India and High Court of Kerala. Vimal Jyothi Engineering College Chemperi - Kannur belongs the Kerala Catholic Engineering College Management’s Association (KCECMA) and tuition fees, admission policies etc. are same. As per the agreement with government, 50% of the B.Tech. seats in all the member colleges of KCECMA will be allotted by Commissioner for Entrance Examinations (CEE).
