= Rampur, Jharkhand =

Rampur
- village
- Location in Jharkhand, India Rampur (India)
- Coordinates: 23°17′0″N 85°26′0″E
- Country: India
- State: Jharkhand
- District: Ranchi
- Elevation: 614 m (2,014 ft)

Languages
  - Official: Hindi, Santali
- Time zone: UTC+5:30 (IST)
- Coastline: 0 kilometres (0 mi)

Rampur is a town in Ranchi district, Jharkhand, India.

== Geography ==
It is located at 23°17′0″N 85°26′0″E at an elevation of 614 m from MSL.

== Location ==
National Highway 33 passes through Rampur.
