= Rampur, Jalandhar =

Rampur Ram Pura
- Village
- Location in Punjab, India Rampur (India)
- Coordinates: 31°06′55″N 75°33′48″E
- Country: India
- State: Punjab
- District: Jalandhar
- Tehsil: Phillaur

Government
  - Type: Panchayat raj
  - Body: Gram panchayat

Area
  - Total: 141 ha (350 acres)

Population (2011)
  - Total: 443; 221/222 ♂/♀
  - Scheduled Castes: 161; 76/85 ♂/♀
  - Total Households: 95

Languages
  - Official: Punjabi
- Time zone: UTC+5:30 (IST)
- Telephone: 01826
- ISO 3166 code: IN-PB
- Vehicle registration: PB-37
- Website: jalandhar.gov.in

Rampur is a village in Phillaur in Jalandhar district of Punjab State, India. It is located 5 kilometres (3.1 mi) from sub district headquarter and 39 kilometres (24 mi) from district headquarter. The village is administrated by Sarpanch an elected representative of the village.

== Demography ==
As of 2011, the village has a total number of 95 houses and a population of 443 of which 221 are males while 222 are females. According to the report published by Census India in 2011, out of the total population of the village 161 people are from Schedule Caste and the village does not have any Schedule Tribe population so far.

== See also ==
- List of villages in India
