= Ramapuram, Annamayya district =

Village in Andhra Pradesh, India

Ramapuram is a village and headquarters of Ramapuram mandal in Annamayya district, Andhra Pradesh, India.
