= Rampur Barara =

Rampur Barara Rāmpur Barāra
- Village
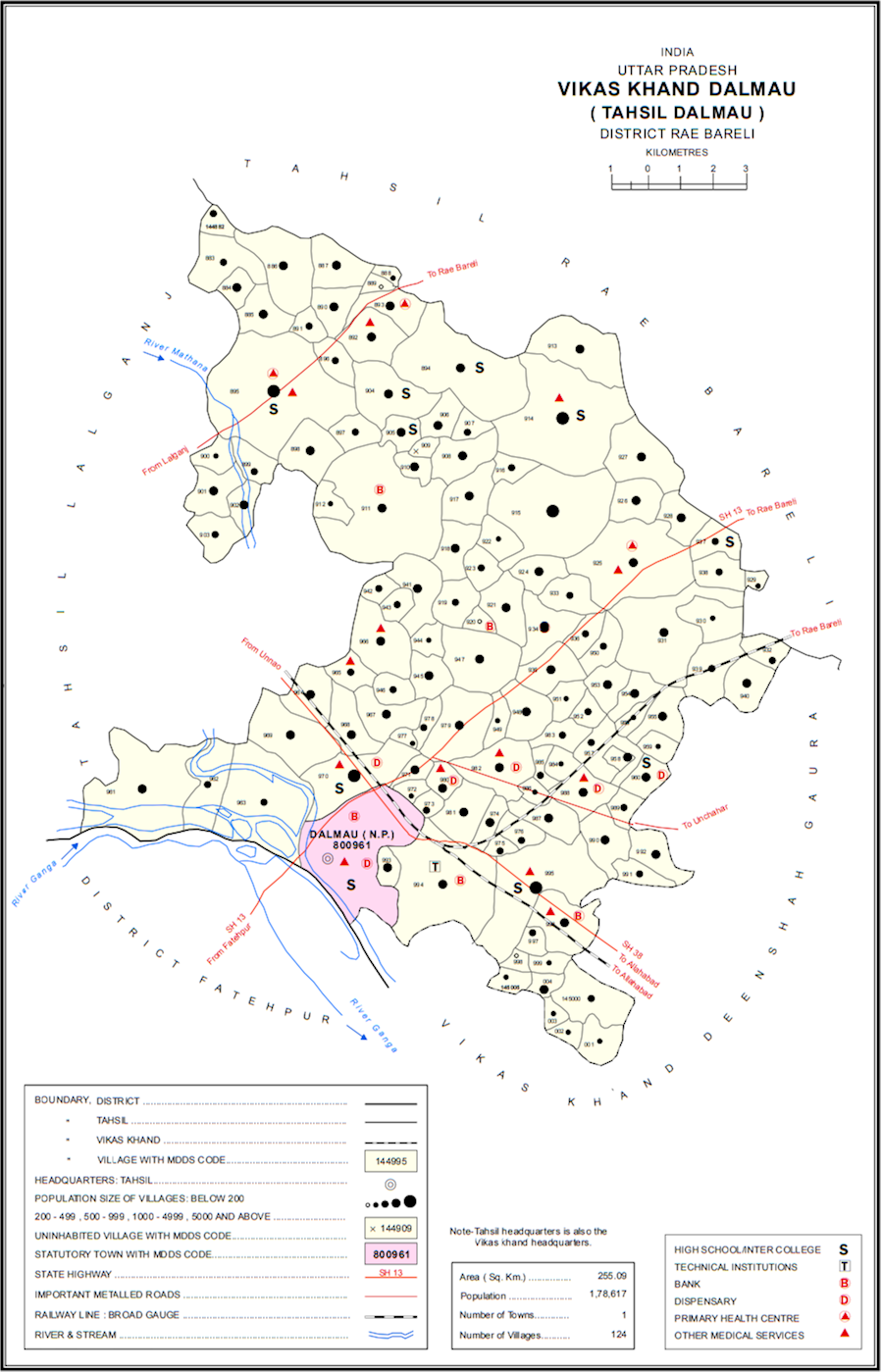
- Map showing Rampur Barara (#997) in Dalmau CD block

- Location in Uttar Pradesh, India
- Coordinates: 26.036418°N 81.093419°E
- Country India: India
- State: Uttar Pradesh
- District: Raebareli

Area
  - Total: 0.609 km^{2} (0.235 sq mi)

Population (2011)
  - Total: 633
  - Density: 1,040/km^{2} (2,690/sq mi)

Languages
  - Official: Hindi
- Time zone: UTC+5:30 (IST)
- Vehicle registration: UP-35

Rampur Barara is a village in Dalmau block of Rae Bareli district, Uttar Pradesh, India. It is located 11 km from Dalmau, the block headquarters. As of 2011, it has a population of 633 people, in 109 households. It has one primary school and no healthcare facilities.

The 1961 census recorded Rampur Barara as comprising 6 hamlets, with a total population of 223 people (108 male and 115 female), in 39 households and 38 physical houses. The area of the village was given as 162 acres.

The 1981 census recorded Rampur Barara as having a population of 370 people, in 61 households, and having an area of 60.70 hectares. The main staple foods were listed as wheat and rice.
