= Ramapuram Sree Rama Temple =

Ramapuram Sree Rama Swami Temple
- രാമപുരം ശ്രീരാമസ്വാമി ക്ഷേത്രം
- Sree Rama Swami Temple, Ramapuram, Kottayam, Kerala

Religion
- Affiliation: Hinduism
- District: Kottayam
- Deity: Rama
- Festival: Thiruvutsavam in Meenam
- Governing body: Ramapuram Devaswom

Location
- Location: Ramapuram
- State: Kerala
- Country: India
- Coordinates: 9°48′05.9″N 76°38′57.8″E

Architecture
- Type: Traditional Kerala style

Specifications
- Temple: One
- Elevation: 63.53 m (208 ft)

Website
- www.nalambalam.org

Sree Rama Swami Temple is an ancient Hindu temple located in Ramapuram village in Meenachil tehsil and near Pala in Kottayam district in the Indian state of Kerala. The temple is classified one among the 108 Abhimana kshetrams of Vaishnavate tradition. The temple has Lord Rama as principal deity, facing the east, who is in a four-armed form, Chathurbahu. It is managed by a trust called Ramapuram Devaswom consisting of three Nambudiri families of Amanakara mana, Kunnoor mana and Karanattu mana.

== Location ==
The temple is located at about 1.5 km (0.93 mi) away from Ramapuram junction on the Pala - Koothattukulam highway. It is at about 35 km from Kottayam, 17 km from Thodupuzha, 12 km from Pala and 10 km from Koothattukulam.

== Temple ==
The structure is believed to be thousand years old. The Sreekovil (sanctum sanctorum) is in a circular shape, covered by copper with a golden finial on the top. Thidappalli and the temple well are placed in the southeast and northeast corners. When crossing the eastern gopuram, a 100 m (330 ft) tall golden flagstaff is placed. In the past, it was made up of copper. The idol of Rama is made up Panchaloha, a composition of five metals. The temple pond is situated to the north, where the aarttu ceremony of Kondadu Dharmasastha temple is performed. The temple is accompanied by 3 other nearby shrines dedicated to Lakshmana, Bharatha and Satrughna, located within a radius of 3 km (1.9 mi). A visit to these four temples during the Karkidaka or Ramayana month is popularly known as Nalambala Darshanam, which brings about achievements and blessings to the devotees.

== Legend ==
The legend says that Lord Rama (incarnation of Lord Vishnu) left his kingdom of Ayodhya and reached the present Ramapuram village through the route which he used to find his spouse Sita during the fourteen years of exile. He found the place as an ideal spot for meditation. His brothers found him missing and they went in search for him towards south. When they found him meditating in a serene place, they too sat beside him and meditated, Lakshmana at Koodapulam, Bharata at Amanakara and Satrughna at Methiri. Over time, separate shrines for them arose in the spots where they meditated and it was famed as Nalambalam.

== Deity ==
Apart from Lord Rama, the temple have other subordinate deities. Shrines of Lord Sastha and Dakshinamurty are placed in the south of Sreekovil. The complex also has the shrines of Goddess Bhardakali, Lord Ganapathi, Hanuman, Brahmarakshas and Yakshiyamma.

== Poojas ==
Five poojas (prayer rituals) and three sheevelis are held every day in the temple.

== Festival ==
The eight day annual festival is hosted in the Malayalam month of Meenam (i.e. March/April) on the chothi star. It is concluded by the aarattu ceremony on the Thiruvonam star, performed in the Amanakara Bharata temple pond. Utsavabali is also an important event during the festival.
