= Ramapuram, Kanyakumari =

Neighbourhood in Kanyakumari district, Tamil Nadu, India

Coordinates: 8°11′48″N 77°28′39″E

Ramapuram is a census village in Kanyakumari District in the Indian State of Tamil Nadu. Its original name (with diacritics) is Rāmāpuram. It has an average elevation of 5 metres. Ramapuram comes under the Agasteeswaram taluk of Kanyakumari District. The Postal Code for Ramapuram is 629303.

== Locale ==
This village is as old as its church, nearly 150 years old. Almost all the residents of this village are from same community, Nanjil Nattu Vellala Pillai. Though they all were orthodox high caste Hindus, families of Ramapuram were converted to Roman Catholic some 220 years ago. There is tomb where the person's year of birth is noted as 1830. People still follow the culture and traditions of their Hindu counterparts.

Near Ramapuram there is a bigger village called Andarkulam. Though Andarkulam is bigger in area and population, Ramapuram remains to be the one that is the center for all important activities.

Every year the village celebrate the feast of Our Lady of Mount Carmel. The sons of the soil come from all over the world to show their gratitude and respect to their beloved Mother Mary. They also meet their friends and relatives.

People of Ramapuram are spread over India and foreign countries. They hold important positions in whichever organization they work.

There is a Village Governing Committee to see the day-to-day affairs.

The church celebrated its 125th year in July 2017.

There is a small hamlet, Kothankulam formerly known as Kothankulachery until 1972. As of 2011 India census, Kothankulam had a population of nearly 300. The 99.2% peoples of this hamlet belongs to Adi Dravidar community (Sambavar). More than 90% peoples believes in Christianity and rest be Hindus (Local Deity Worship). This hamlet is known for their own village culture, most of them do agricultural works. The peoples of this hamlet gives more importance to education, sports, spiritual and self development. They have their own Library(Ayyan Valluvan Library), Dr.B.R.Ambedkar social welfare club, Gymnasium, Play ground, Women self help group and Martial arts training.

In 1893, The Salvation Army an International Christian Protestant organization step into this Kothankulam hamlet, and lead them into educational, economical and spiritual development. Mr. Rackeal Yesuvadian be the first converted Christian of this hamlet. In AD 3rd century, these people's performs spiritual, black magic and worked as priests in Nanjil Perunan's and Nanjil Valluvan's Court and later in Kingdom of Travancore. The local Hindus worship deities such as Sudalaimadan, Esakiamman, Ravanasamban and Santhana Mariamman. These peoples and nearby Theroor Sambavars claim to be Sambu Vanniyars that they migrated to Kanyakumari from Kumbakonam areas of Thanjavur long ago. These people's were best in their martial arts such as Silambam, Vaalveechu, Maankombu, Surulvaal. They celebrates Dr. B.R. Ambedkar's birthday as a biggest festival than their other religious festivals.

== Nearby places ==
- 2.7 km W of Kanyakumari district,
- 9.8 km SE of Suchindram,
- 15.1 km SE of Nagercoil,
- 27.2 km ExSE of Manavalakurichi.
