= Chemperi =

- Town
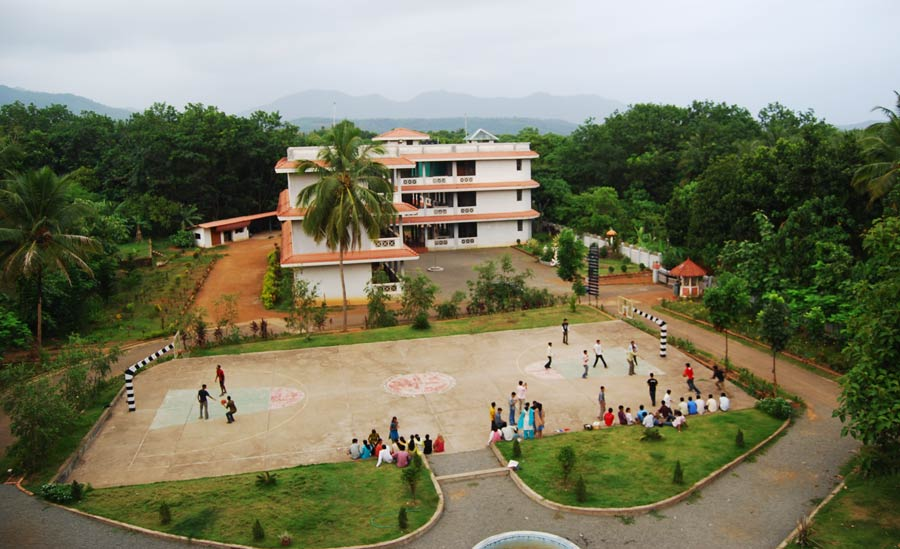
- Vimal Jyothi Engineering College, Chemperi

- Location in Kerala, India Chemperi (India)
- Coordinates: 12.0950°N 75.5451°E
- Country: India
- State: Kerala
- District: Kannur
- Taluk: Taliparamba

Government
  - Body: Eruvessy Grama panchayat

Area
  - Total: 54.06 km^{2} (20.87 sq mi)
- Elevation: 50 m (160 ft)

Population (2011)
  - Total: 19,216
  - Density: 355.5/km^{2} (920.6/sq mi)

Languages
  - Official: Malayalam, English
- Time zone: UTC+5:30 (IST)
- PIN: 670632
- Telephone code: 04602
- ISO 3166 code: IN-KL
- Vehicle registration: KL-59
- Literacy: 100%
- Assembly constituency: Irikkur
- Lok Sabha Constituency: Kannur
- Nearest city: Kannur
- Nearest Railway Station: Kannur Railway Station
- Nearest Airport: Kannur International Airport (CNN)

Chemperi is a town on the bank of the Chemperi River, in the Western Ghat, in the Kannur district of South India. It is characterized by its production and export of rubber and spices, its beautiful hillocks, and its serene streams. Village and Panchayath of Chemperi is Eruvessi. Both Panchayath and Village offices of Eruvessi are located in Chemperi. Also Lourde Matha Basilica, Chemperi is another attraction. Paithalmala and Palakkayam Thattu is also a few kilometres away.

== History ==
Previously, the land served as the epicenter of people migrating from Travancore to the north districts of Kerala. The modern history of Chemperi starts in the 1930s with the arrival of migrants from the Kottayam district of Kerala. These migrants made Chemperi a big town with almost all the facilities needed to serve its population. More recently, the town has become a local business hub.

Eruvessy, which is very near to Chemperi, has a different historical background. It is believed that the inhabitants there descend from 18th century settlers of the Eruvessy region. The culture and belief system of the people of Eruvessy is entirely different from that of the people of Chemperi, though the neighboring communities live harmoniously. Eruvessy is Famous in Hindu religion for Muthappan Temple in the place.

== Economy ==
The economic mainstay of Chemperi is agriculture. Primary crops include rubber, coconut, pepper, cashew, tapioca, areca nut, and other plantation crops. Rubber occupies the largest land area among plantation crops. Recent increases in the price of rubber have improved the economic condition of many local families. Next to rubber, coconut is the most popular crop. Cashew is yet another important plantation and areca nuts are also important. Pepper is generally intercropped with coconut, areca nut and various fruit trees. In the hilly surroundings of Chemperi, such as in Nellikutty and Areekamala, this inter-cultivation is done between rubber and cashew. The employment situation in Chemperi is slowly changing. Many people seek employment in the Middle East and in other cities of India. Also, as Chemperi and neighborhoods are more depended on agriculture for income, many people are engaged with jobs related agriculture such as rubber tapping, farming related jobs, etc. Many other people depend construction field for job in Chemperi and neighborhoods. The establishment of Vimal Jyoti Engineering college has improved both the employment and education outlook in Chemperi.

== Climate ==
Chemperi's climate is humid. The weather is pleasant in December, January and February. An oppressive hot season stretches from March until the end of May, followed by the southwest monsoon, which continues until the end of September. October and November bring the northeast monsoon, Thulamazha.

Average Weather Condition: 22 °C - 34 °C

== Education ==
Nirmala Lower Primary School was the first educational institution in Chemperi. It was founded in 1950 by the parish of Chemperi to fulfill the wish of the migrant fathers. The school was first managed by the parish of Chemperi. Later, the diocese started a corporate educational agency and the school became a part of it. In 1953, Nirmala High School was established and was the first high school in the migrant areas. Students from Alakode, Chandanakkampara, Paisakkari, Nellikutty, Pottamplavu, Kudianmala, Vellad, Vayattuparamba were educated in this school.

In 1998, the high-school was upgraded to a higher secondary school; Nirmala Higher Secondary School was the first higher secondary in the migrant area; catering to the needs of all the people in and around Chemperi. There is a network of government schools, corporate schools and CBSE schools in and around Chemperi.

=== Vimal Jyothi Engineering College ===
Chemperi has become a center of professional education in Kerala. The new Vimal Jyothi Engineering College or Vimaljyothi Engineering College, in Jyothinagar, Chemperi, is affiliated with APJ Abdul Kalam Technological University and is a self-financing engineering college, sanctioned in 2002 by the All India Council For Technical Education. It is one of the premier institutes of technology in Malabar, and recently the college has been ranked among the A grade colleges in Kerala. Later they expanded the institution with management studies with the Vimal Jyothi Institute of Management and Research, It is an educational project of the Archdiocese of Thalassery and is managed by the Meshar Diocesan Educational Trust. Msgr Mathew M Chalil, the Vicar General of the Archdiocese of Tellicherry is the manager of the college. The project includes a management institute, with more rural educational opportunities designed for the future.

=== Schools and colleges ===
- Nirmala LP School
- Nirmala UP School
- Nirmala Higher Secondary School
- St. Thomas Public School
- Vimal Jyothi Engineering College
- Vimal Jyothi Institute of Management and Research

== Tourism ==
Paithal Mala and Palakkayam Thattu are the tourist attraction near Chemperi, which tourists can visit year round. It is a hill station near Kudianmala, on the Kerala-Karnataka border and is 65 km north of Kannur. According to the Kerala Government Department of Tourism, the place is ideal for trekking, and adventure tourism. Paithal Mala is located at around 1,450 metres (4,700 ft) above sea level. There is a base reception centre at Pottamplavu and a watchtower atop the cliff.

== Health ==
Vimala Hospital is the major healthcare provider of modern medicine. All advanced medical treatments, except emergency management, are available. There are also other allopathic, ayurvedic and homeopathic clinics in Chemperi.

== Transportation ==
Chemperi has a wide network of roads. Hill Highway, the prestigious road of Kerala, passes through Chemperi. There are well-maintained roads connecting Taliparamba, Sreekandapuram, Iritty, Alakode, Kudianmala and Paithalmala. The newly established Kannur International Airport is 35 km from Chemperi. The nearest railway station is Kannur; 50 kilometres (31 mi) away. The nearest port is Mangalore. The national highway passes through Taliparamba town. Mangalore, Goa and Mumbai can be accessed on the northern side and Cochin and Thiruvananthapuram can be accessed on the southern side. Taliparamba has a good bus station and buses are easily available to all parts of Kannur district. The road to the east of Iritty connects to Mysore and Bangalore. The nearest railway stations are Kannapuram and Kannur on Shoranur-Mangalore Section. Trains are available to almost all parts of India subject to advance booking over the internet. There are airports at Kannur, Mangalore and Calicut. All of them are international airports though direct flights available only to Middle Eastern countries.
