= Rampur Jetha =

Rampur Jetha Rampurwa village
- village
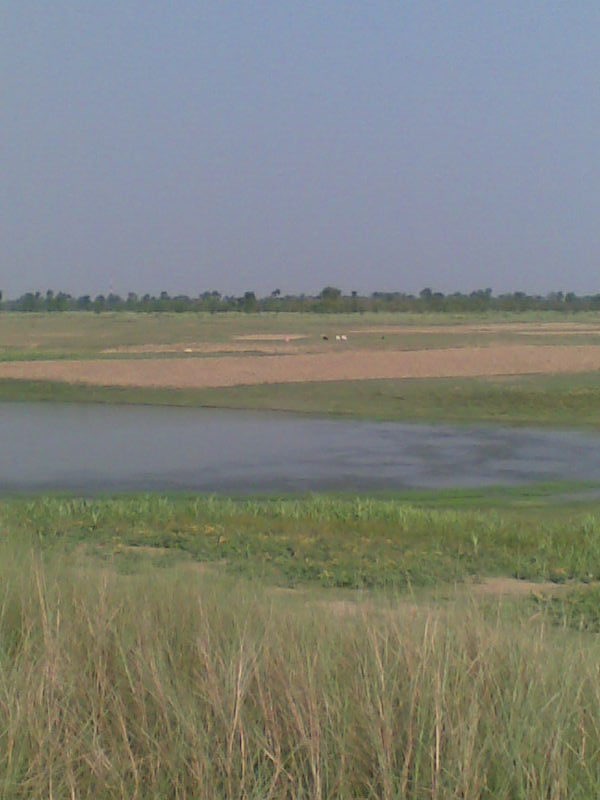
- Budhi Gandak

- Location in Mehsi, Bihar, India Rampur Jetha (India)
- Coordinates: 26°22′08″N 85°06′15″E
- Country: India
- State: Bihar
- Division: Tirhut
- District: East Champaran
- Block: Mehsi
- Founder: Mahesh Rawaut
- Elevation: 51 m (167 ft)

Languages
  - Official: Bhojpuri, Hindi
- Time zone: UTC+5:30 (IST)
- PIN: 845426
- Telephone code: +91-6257
- ISO 3166 code: IN-BR
- Nearest city: Mehsi
- Lok Sabha constituency: Motihari
- Vidhan Sabha constituency: Pipra, Purvi Champaran (Vidhan Sabha constituency)
- Avg. summer temperature: 38 °C (100 °F)
- Avg. winter temperature: 12 °C (54 °F)

Rampur Jetha is a village situated in Mehsi, East Champaran District in the Indian state of Bihar. The village is commonly known as Rampurwa among the localities. It lies in the Mirjapur Panchayat region. It is situated at the bank of river Burhi Gandak River on whose bank the village has flourished. It is well connected by road and railways. The nearest city Kaswa Mehsi in Mehsi, which is 2 km from the village. The nearest railway station is Mehsi railway station, which is around 5 km from the village.

The village is located 2 km east of Mehsi police station. Mehsi is an entry point of East Champaran if travelling from Patna, Muzaffarpur to Raxaul, connected both by railway and roadway. This small community has a number of places of interest at the east side of railway station. These include Mirza Halim Shah mosque, dargah, a very old library 'Nagrik Pustakalaya', an old high school (Tirhut Vidyalaya) of the English period, orchards of lichi and mangoes and other places of interest. There are many button factories, a small scale industry, although most of the people depend upon agriculture and commerce. Mehsi was the birthplace of the writer and intellectual, Rajkamal Chaudhary. The last sentence about the birthplace of Rajkamal Chaudhary is not at Mehsi of District East Champaran, but it is at Saharsa district of Bihar.

== Location ==
The village is located 1 km east of Mehsi Police-station. The nearest highway is NH-28 which is 1.5 km west of village.

== River ==
The village is situated on the bank of a Himalayan foothills Someshwer Range originated, perennial river Budhi Gandak on which bank the village has grown up and flourished.

== Economy ==
The basic lively-hood is agriculture and cottage industry. Rampurwa is one of major producer of lichi in Mehsi. There are many button factories, a small scale industry, although most of the people depend upon agriculture and commerce.

== Demographics ==
As of the 2001 India census the total population of the village is 375. The literacy rate is 65.61%. The female literacy rate is 47.1%. The male literacy rate is 78.71%.

== Climate ==
The summer, April–July is extremely hot and humid (28/40 deg C,90% Max.) and winter is cold, around 06/20 deg C.

== Gallery ==
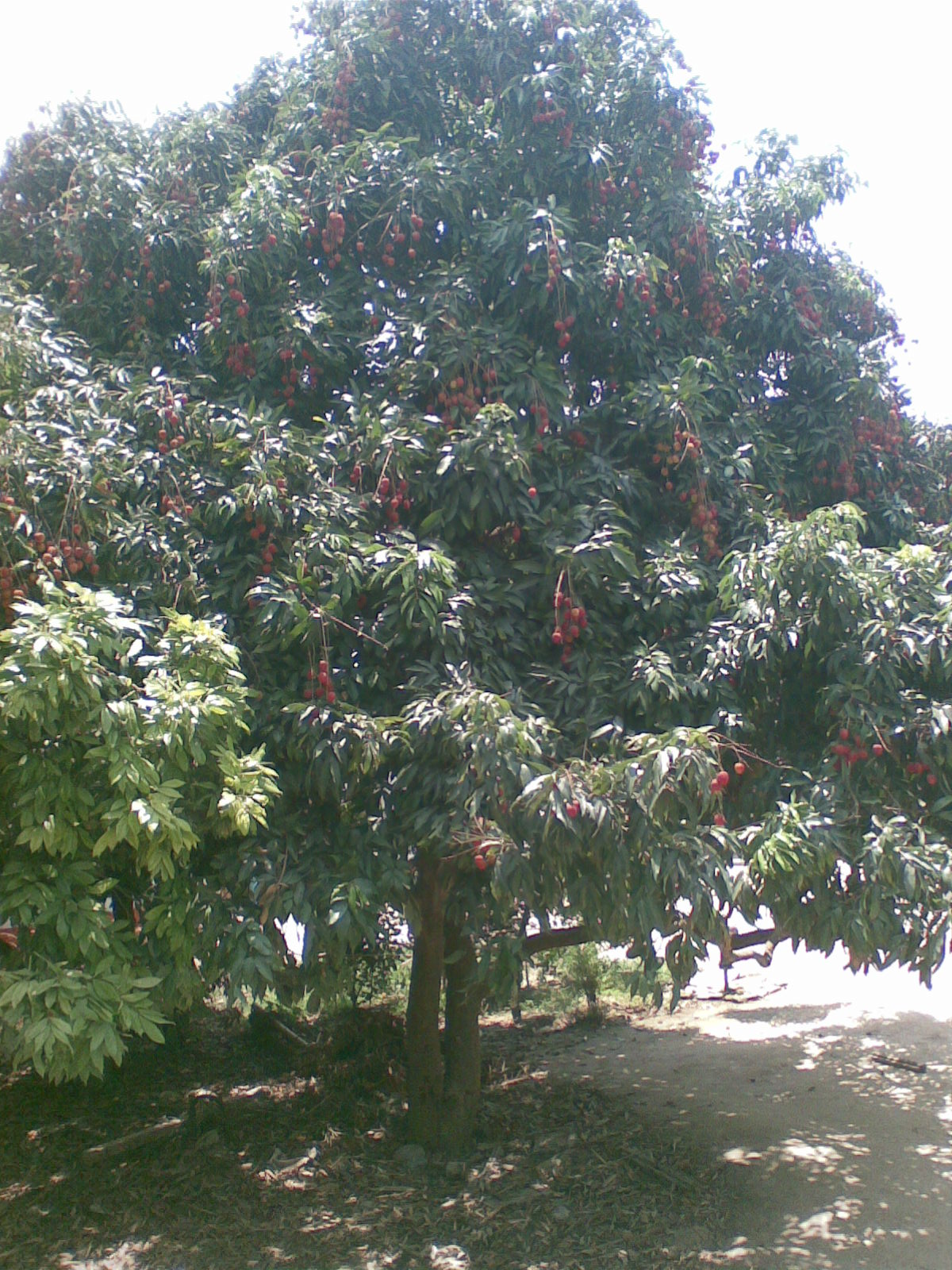
Lichi Orchards Rampurwa Mehsi

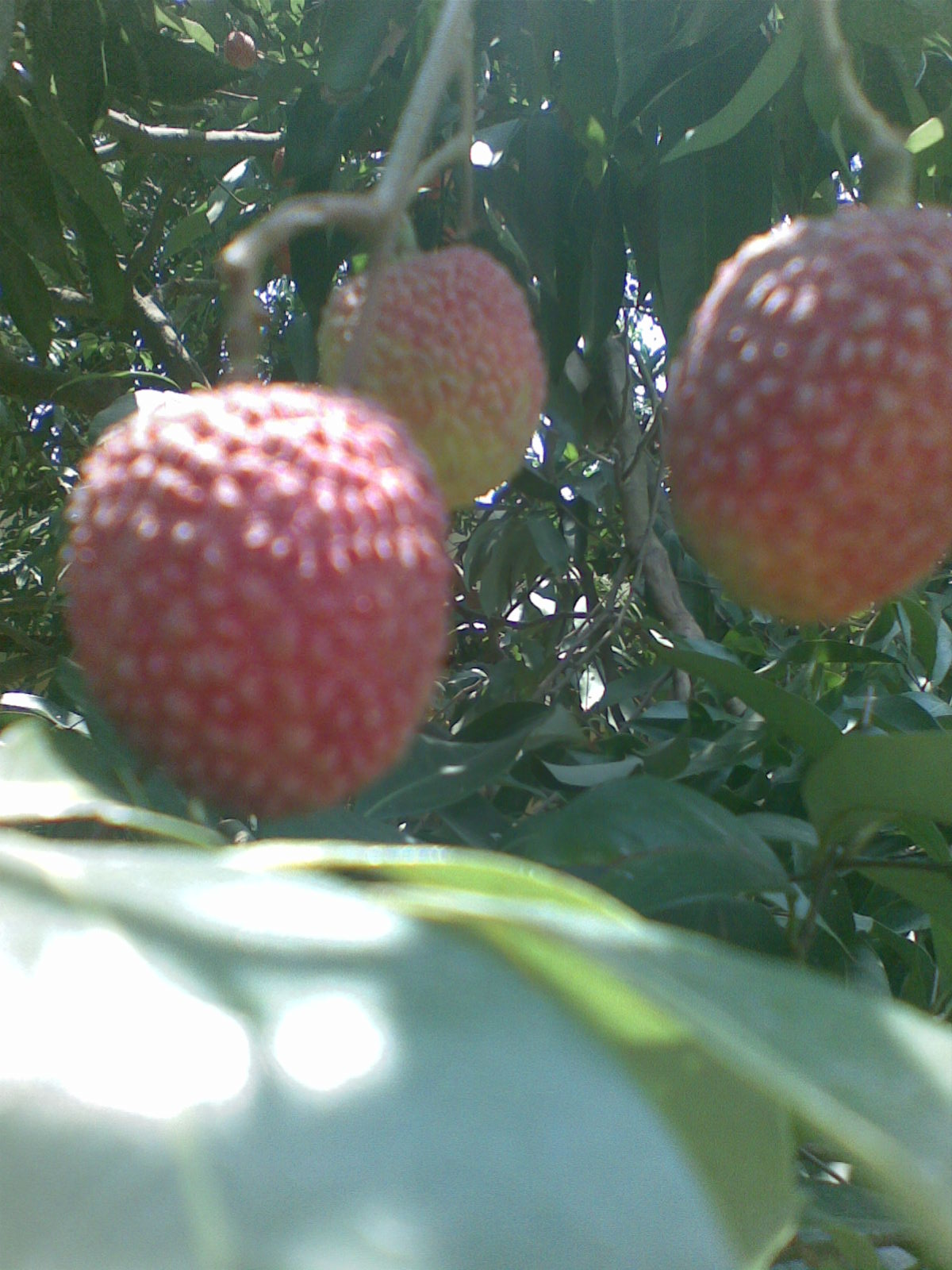
Juicy Rampurwa Lichi

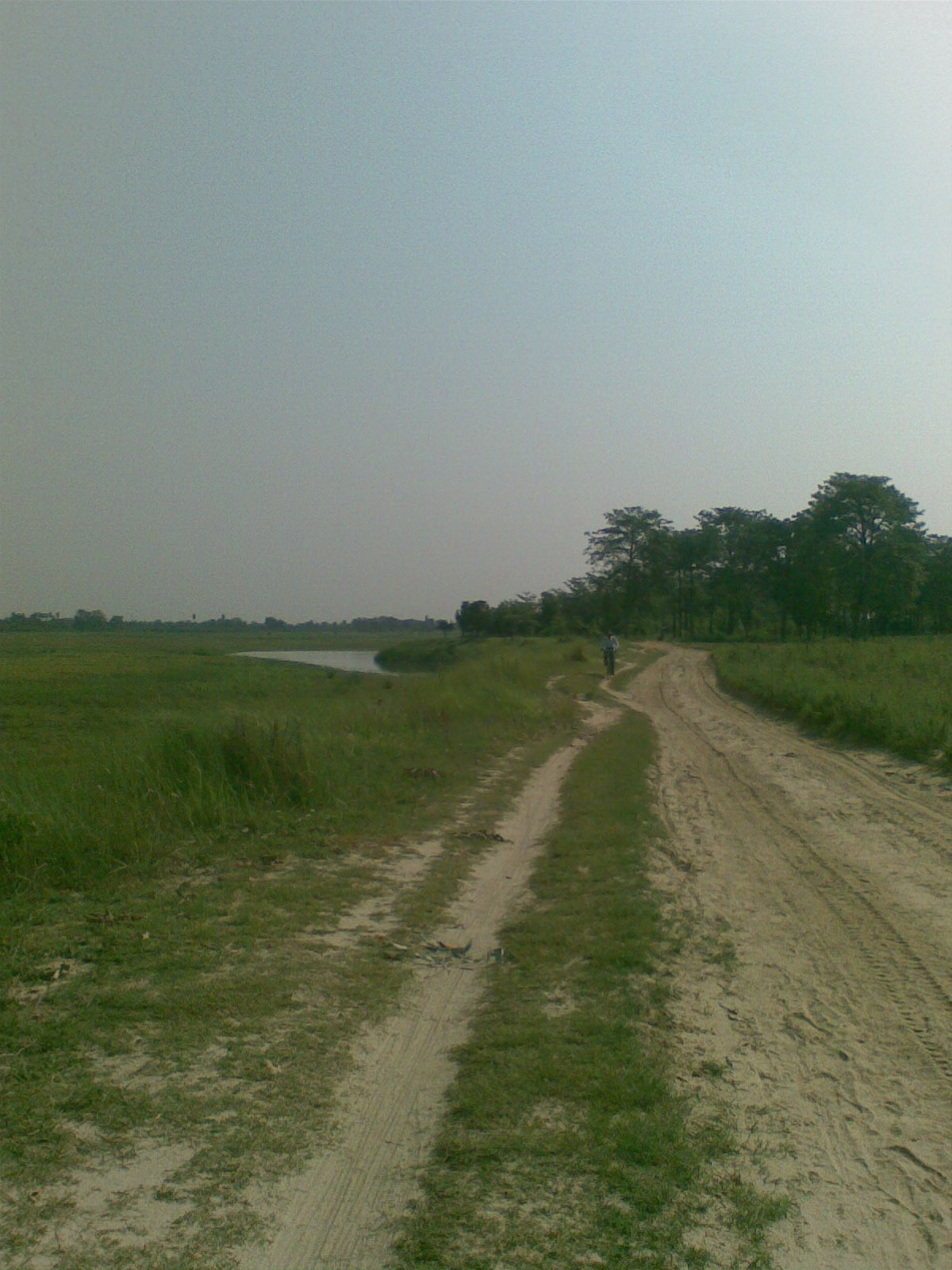
Shore Of Budhi Gandak in Rampurwa Mehsi

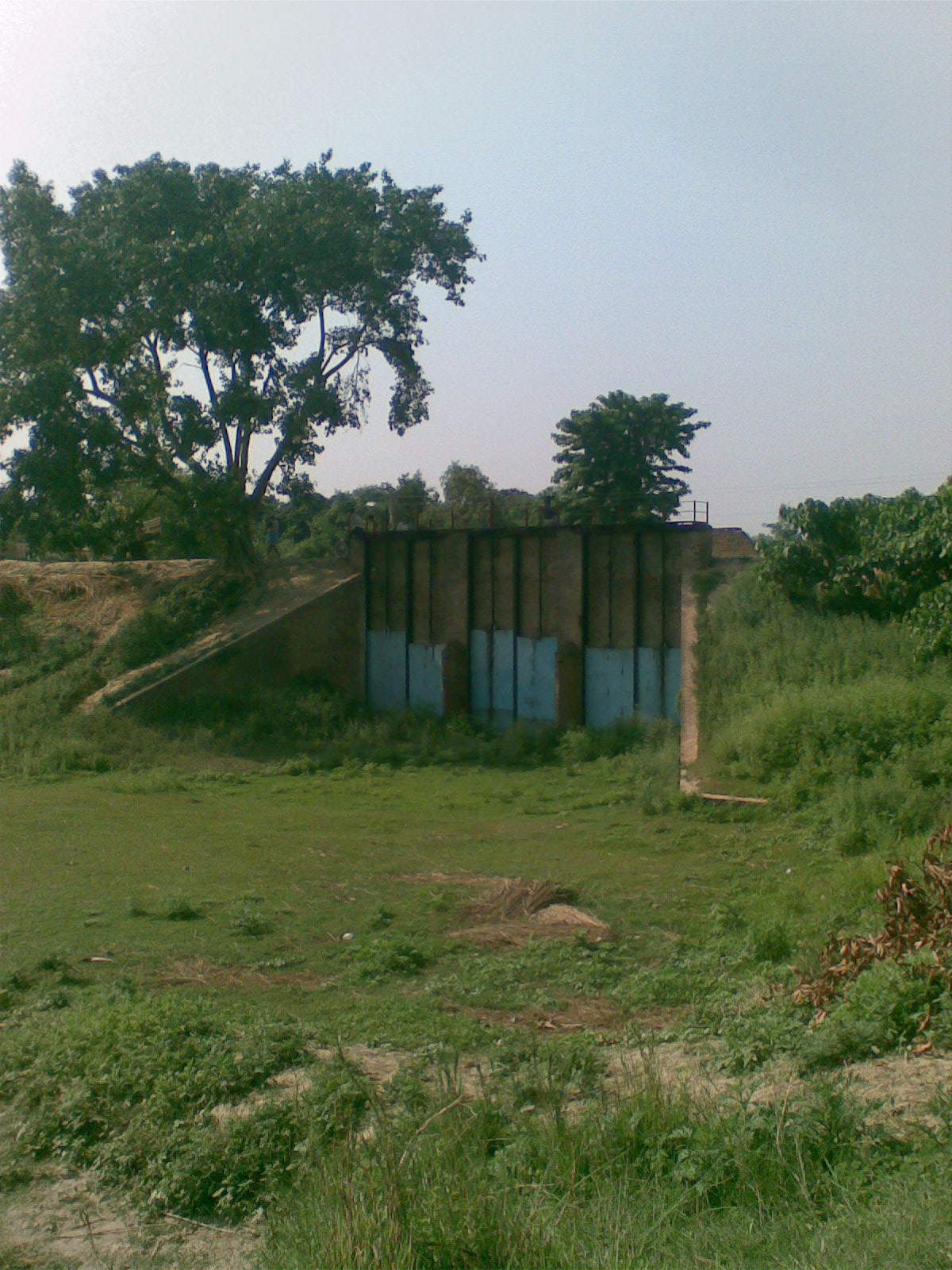
Embankment Gate Of Dam On River Budhi Gandak in Rampurwa, Mehsi

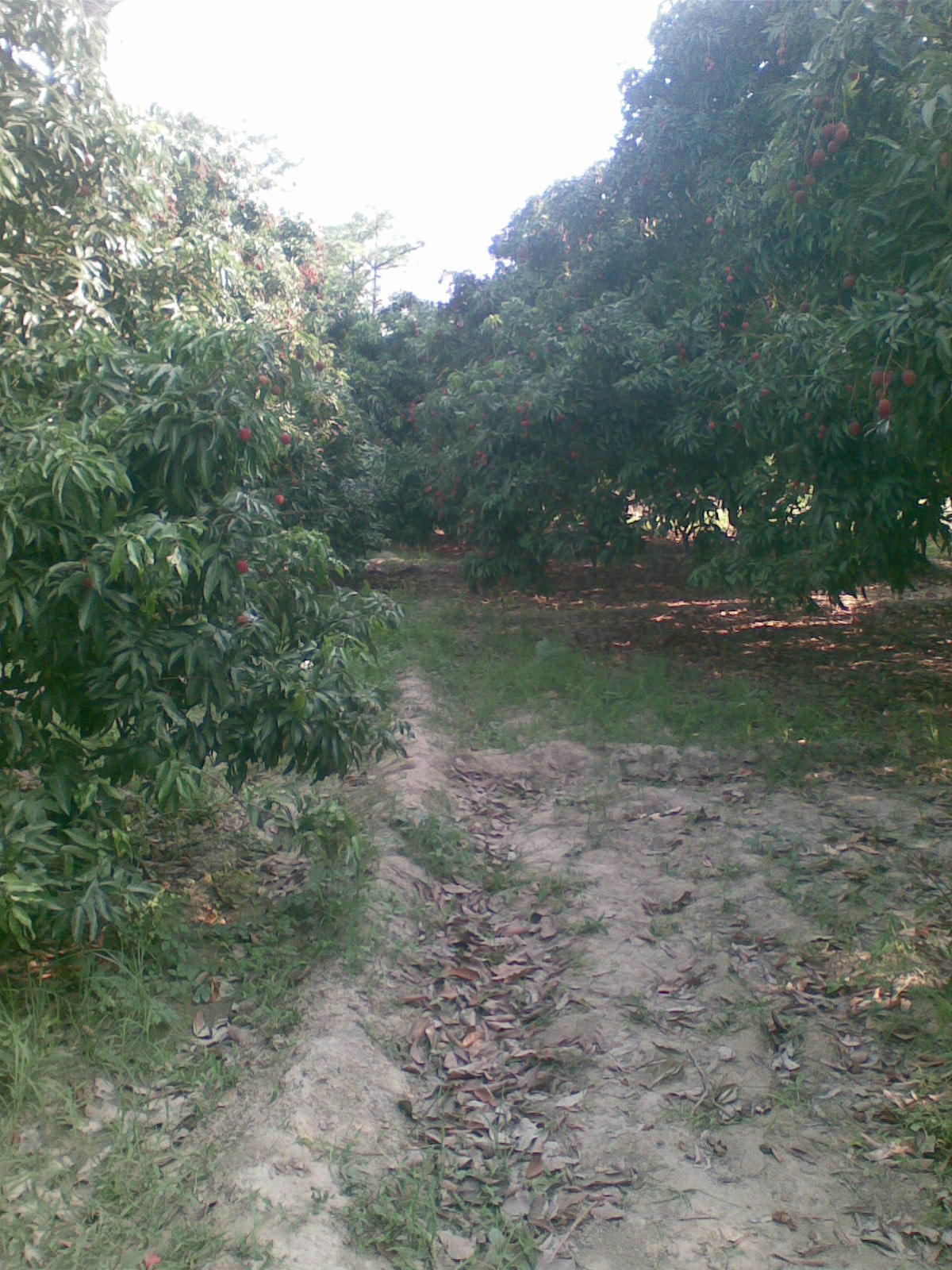
Lichi Orchards of Rampurwa Mehsi

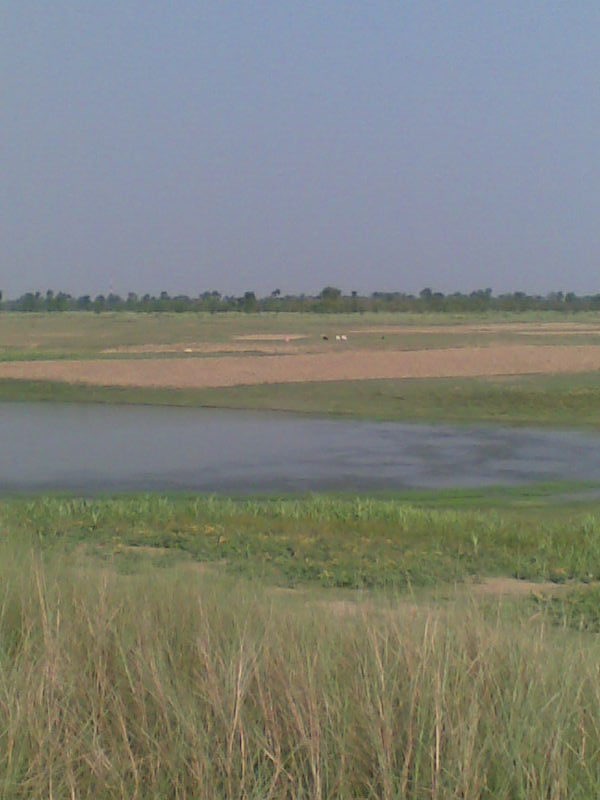
Budhi Gandak river bank in Rampurwa Mehsi

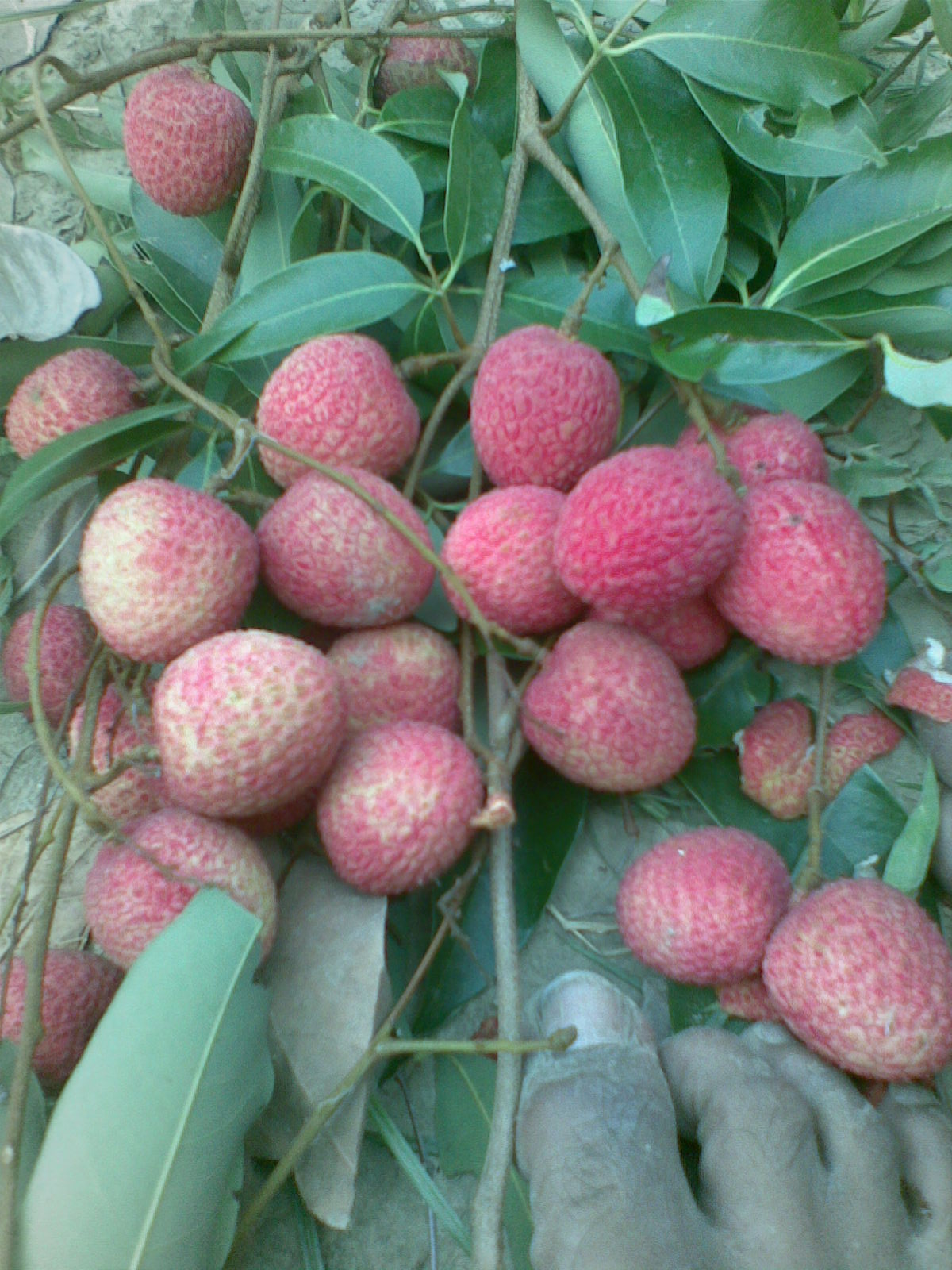
Rampurwa Lichis

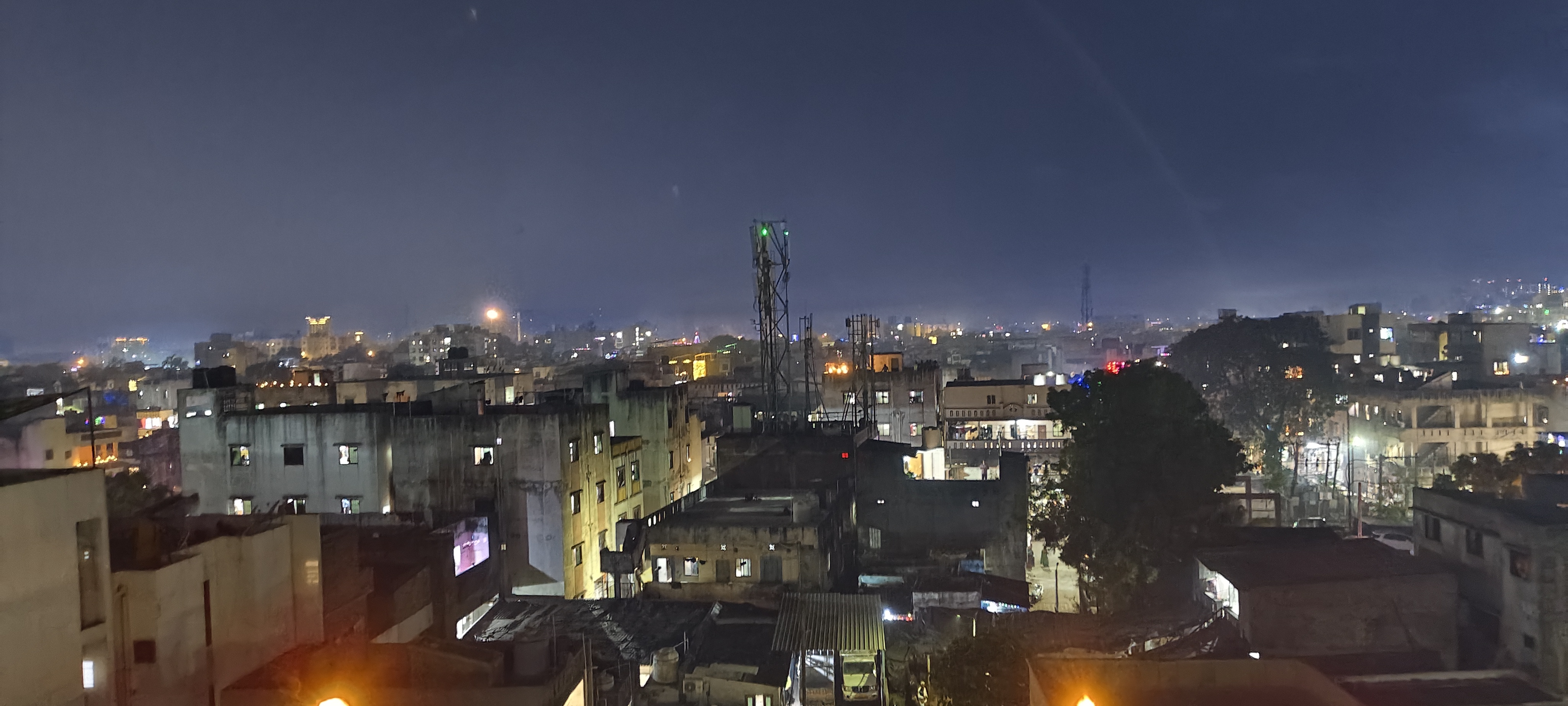
V.I.P Rd, Chowk Bazar in Mehsi

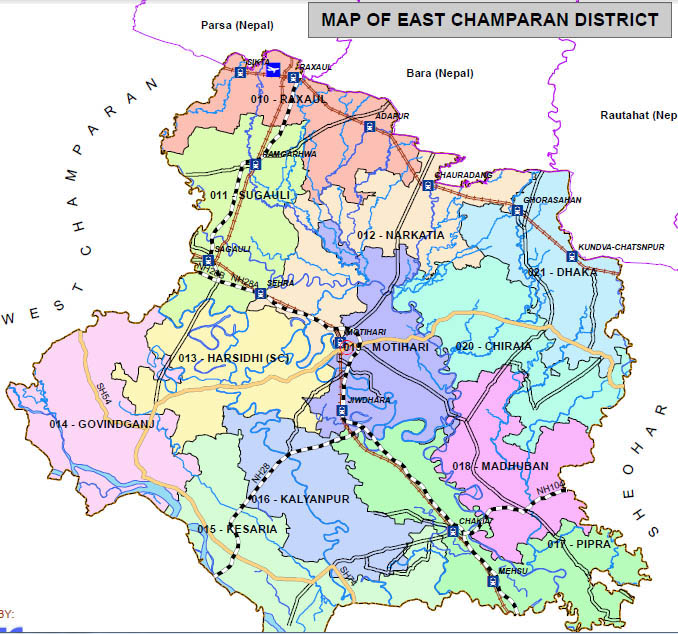
Mehsi Entry point

== Notes ==
- The number of households in Rampurwa is 48. All the households are rural households.
- Female to male ratio of Rampurwa is 91.33% compared to the Bihar's female to male ratio 91.93%.
- The literacy rate of the village is 65.61% compared to the literacy rate of state 47%. The literacy rate of the village is better than state literacy rate.
- The female literacy rate is 47.1% compared to male literacy rate of 82.99%.
- The total working population is 69.47% of the total population. 91.84% of the men are working population . 45.65% of the women are working population.
- The main working population is 44.56% of the total population. 68.71% of the men are main working population . 18.84% of the women are main working population . While the marginal working population is 24.91% of the total population. 23.13% of the men are marginal working population. 26.81% of the women are marginal working population.
- The total non-working population is 30.53% of the total population. 8.16% of the men are non-working population . 54.35% of the women are non-working population.
