= Ramapuram, Thanjavur =

Ramapuram
- village
- Country: India
- State: Tamil Nadu
- District: Thanjavur
- Taluk: Thanjavur

Population (2001)
  - Total: 1,466

Languages
  - Official: Tamil
- Time zone: UTC+5:30 (IST)

Ramapuram is a village in the Thanjavur taluk of Thanjavur district, Tamil Nadu, India.

== Demographics ==
As per the 2001 census, Ramapuram had a total population of 1466 with 729 males and 739 females. The sex ratio was 10:17, and the literacy rate was 78:12.
