= Rampur Birta =

Rampur Birta may refer to:

- Rampur Birta, Janakpur
- Rampur Birta, Sagarmatha
