= Rampur, Dang =

Rampur, Dang Deukhuri रामपुर
- Village Development Committee
- Location in Nepal
- Coordinates: 27.97°N 82.55°E
- Country: Nepal
- Province: Lumbini Province
- District: Dang Deukhuri District

Population (1991)
  - Total: 9,422
- Time zone: UTC+5:45 (Nepal Time)

Rampur is a town and Village Development Committee in Dang Deukhuri District in Lumbini Province of south-western Nepal. At the time of the 1991 Nepal census it had a population of 9,422 persons living in 1576 individual households.
