= Rampur, Dahanu (census code 551636) =

Village in Maharashtra

Rampur
- village
- Location in Maharashtra, India Rampur (India)
- Coordinates: 20.03448335°N 73.02616596°E
- Country: India
- State: Maharashtra
- District: Palghar
- Taluka: Dahanu
- Elevation: 163 m (535 ft)

Population (2011)
  - Total: 975
- Time zone: UTC+5:30 (IST)
- 2011 census code: 551636

Rampur is a village in the Palghar district of Maharashtra, India. It is located in the Dahanu taluka. It lies along the Maharashtra State Highway 73.

== Demographics ==
According to the 2011 census of India, Rampur has 175 households. The effective literacy rate (i.e. the literacy rate of population excluding children aged 6 and below) is 19.43%.

Demographics (2011 Census)
	Total	Male	Female
Population	975	446	529
Children aged below 6 years	234	114	120
Scheduled caste	0	0	0
Scheduled tribe	973	446	527
Literates	144	90	54
Workers (all)	582	265	317
Main workers (total)	548	252	296
Main workers: Cultivators	531	245	286
Main workers: Agricultural labourers	13	5	8
Main workers: Household industry workers	0	0	0
Main workers: Other	4	2	2
Marginal workers (total)	34	13	21
Marginal workers: Cultivators	28	10	18
Marginal workers: Agricultural labourers	6	3	3
Marginal workers: Household industry workers	0	0	0
Marginal workers: Others	0	0	0
Non-workers	393	181	212
