= Rampur, Dahanu (census code 551582) =

Village in Maharashtra

Rampur
- village
- Location in Maharashtra, India Rampur (India)
- Coordinates: 20.06963705°N 72.7537179°E
- Country: India
- State: Maharashtra
- District: Palghar
- Taluka: Dahanu
- Elevation: 27 m (89 ft)

Population (2011)
  - Total: 4,888
- Time zone: UTC+5:30 (IST)
- 2011 census code: 551582

Rampur (better known as "Plot" locally or 'Gholvad East'), is the village situated east side of the Railway Station, Gholvad in the Palghar district of Maharashtra, India. It is located in the Dahanu taluka. Gholvad Gram Panchayat recently got split into two villages to form Rampur as east side of the jurisdiction.

== Demographics ==
According to the 2011 census of India, Rampur has 1090 households. The literacy rate of the village is 50.84%.

Demographics (2011 Census)
	Total	Male	Female
Population	4888	2319	2569
Children aged below 6 years	688	350	338
Scheduled caste	23	10	13
Scheduled tribe	4053	1902	2151
Literates	2485	1380	1105
Workers (all)	2353	1298	1055
Main workers (total)	2224	1256	968
Main workers: Cultivators	44	28	16
Main workers: Agricultural labourers	1498	764	734
Main workers: Household industry workers	33	18	15
Main workers: Other	649	446	203
Marginal workers (total)	129	42	87
Marginal workers: Cultivators	9	2	7
Marginal workers: Agricultural labourers	101	32	69
Marginal workers: Household industry workers	0	0	0
Marginal workers: Others	19	8	11
Non-workers	2535	1021	1514
