= Ramapuram, Alappuzha =

Ramapuram
- Village
- Location in Kerala, India Ramapuram (India)
- Coordinates: 9°13′0″N 76°28′0″E
- Country: India
- State: Kerala
- District: Alappuzha

Languages
  - Official: Malayalam, English
- Time zone: UTC+5:30 (IST)
- PIN: 690508
- Vehicle registration: KL-29(Kayamkulam)

Ramapuram is a small village in Kayamkulam in the Karthikappally Taluk of Alappuzha district in Kerala, India. Famous film actress K. P. A. C. Lalitha was born in Ramapuram.

== Geography ==
Ramapuram is a small village in Central Kerala. It is bordered by the Kanyakumari-Panvel National Highway 66. Nearest villages are Muthukulam, Cheppad, Evoor and Pathiyoor. The nearest major towns are Haripad and Kayamkulam which are well connected by Kayamkulam-Muthukulam-Haripad road and National Highway 66. The nearest railway station are Haripad (HAD) and Kayamkulam (KYJ) and cheppad halt.

== Landmarks ==
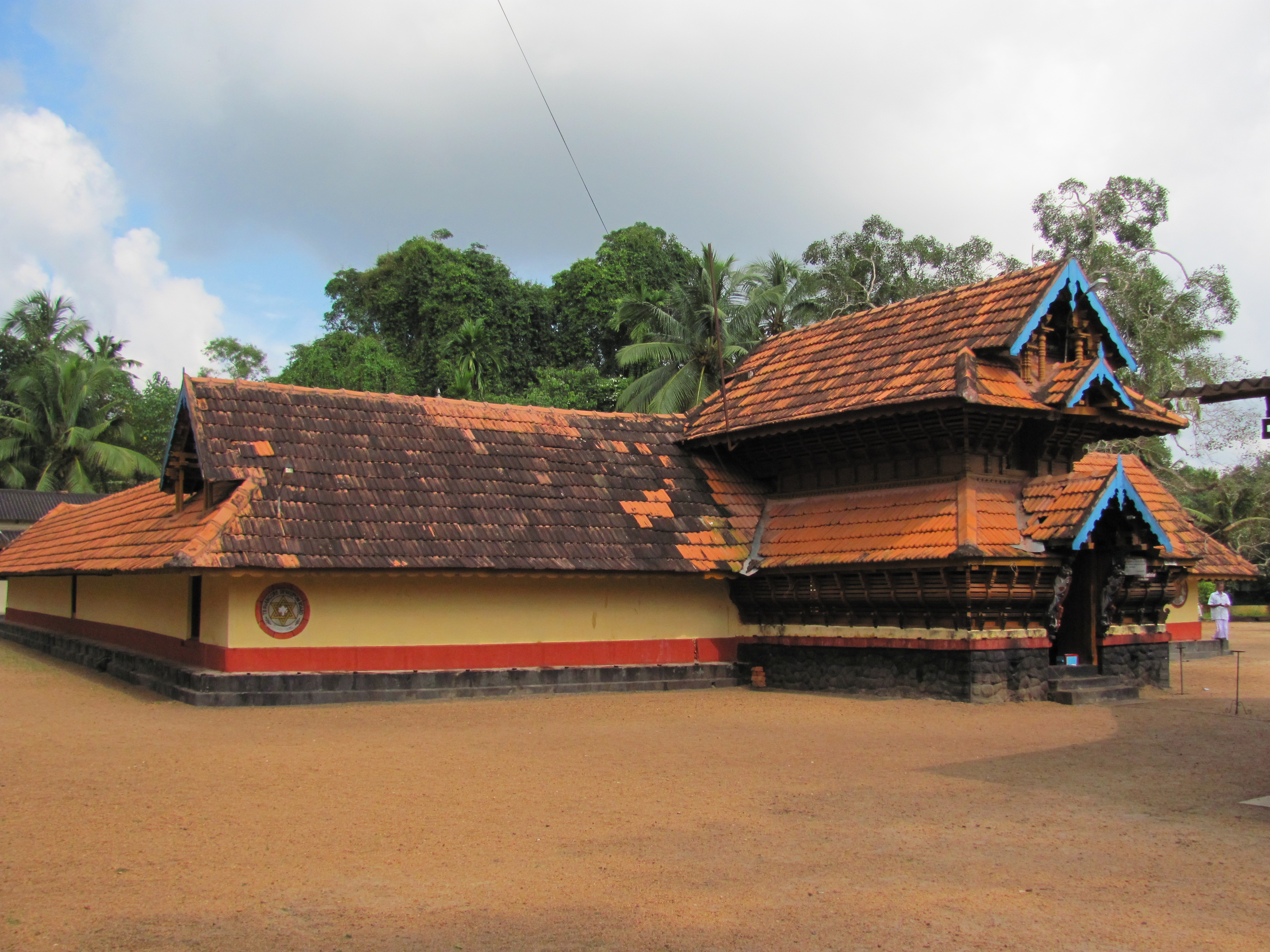
Sree Bhuvaneshwari temple, Ramapuram

Ramapuram Devi Temple, which is one of the oldest and important temples in the Travancore, is the major attraction of Ramapuram. Ramapurathamma is considered as the Kingdom goddess of Odanadu dynasty. Lalithaparameswari seated in sreechakra and Sree Bhadrakali is worshiped in the temple. 'Bhadra' means good and 'Kali' means goddess of time. So, Bhadrakali is worshipped for prosperity and salvation. Devi is considered as the creator, protector, destructor, nature, power and Kundalini shakthi and bhuvaneshwari. The temple has 3 "Karas", or territories. The temple is at the centre of the three Karas which are Ramapuram South, Ramapuram stanathinakam (centre) and Ramapuram North. Vrishchika bharani, Kumbha bharani & Makara Ashwathi of Malayalam calendar are celebrated here. The temple located at NH 66 besides from haripad 7 km and kayamkulam towrds 8 km from temple.

== Politics ==
Ramapuram is part of Kayamkulam Assembly of Alappuzha Lok sabha Constituency and A. M. Ariff is the current Member of Parliament. Adv U Prathibha is the Current Member of legislative Assembly.
