= Chandanakampara =

- Village
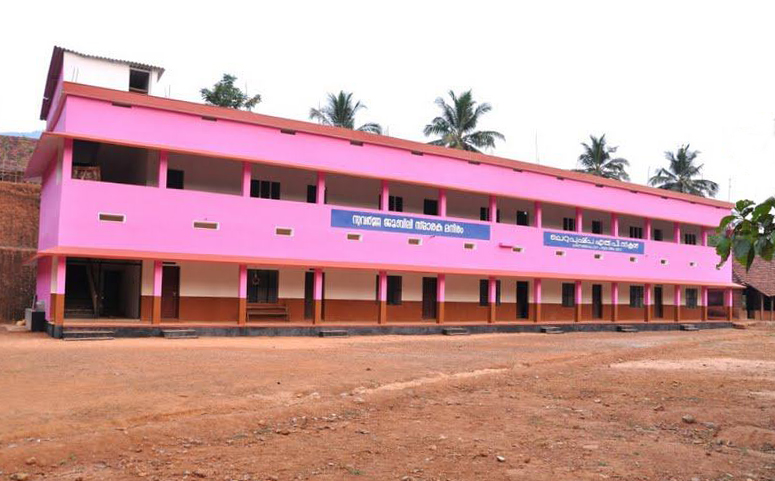
- Little Flower School

- Location in Kerala, India Chandanakampara (India)
- Country: India
- State: Kerala
- District: Kannur

Government
  - Body: Payyavoor Grama Panchayat

Languages
  - Official: Malayalam, English
- Time zone: UTC+5:30 (IST)
- PIN: 670633
- Telephone code: 0460-2214&2215
- ISO 3166 code: IN-KL
- Nearest Town: Payyavoor (8 km)
- Lok Sabha constituency: Kannur
- Vidhan Sabha constituency: Irikkur

Chandanakampara is a village in Kannur district in the Indian state of Kerala. This village is part of Western Ghats.

== Demographics ==
The majority of the people living in this village are descendants of those who migrated from central Kerala in the early second half of the twentieth century.

== Economy ==
People of this village are mainly farmers. Rubber, coconut, cashewnut, arecanut, cocco, pepper and nutmeg are the main crops.

== Transportation ==
The national highway passes through Taliparamba town. Goa and Mumbai can be accessed on the northern side and Cochin and Thiruvananthapuram can be accessed on the southern side. Taliparamba has a good bus station and buses are easily available to all parts of Kannur district. The road to the east of Iritty connects to Mysore and Bangalore. The nearest railway stations are Kannapuram and Kannur on Mangalore-Palakkad line. Trains are available to almost all parts of India subject to advance booking over the internet. The area airport at Kannur, is the closest, at a distance of 42 km; Mangalore and Calicut are other airports closer by distance to Chandanakkampara.

== Image gallery ==
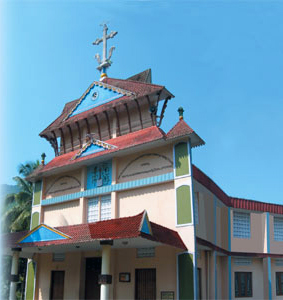
Cherupushpam Church

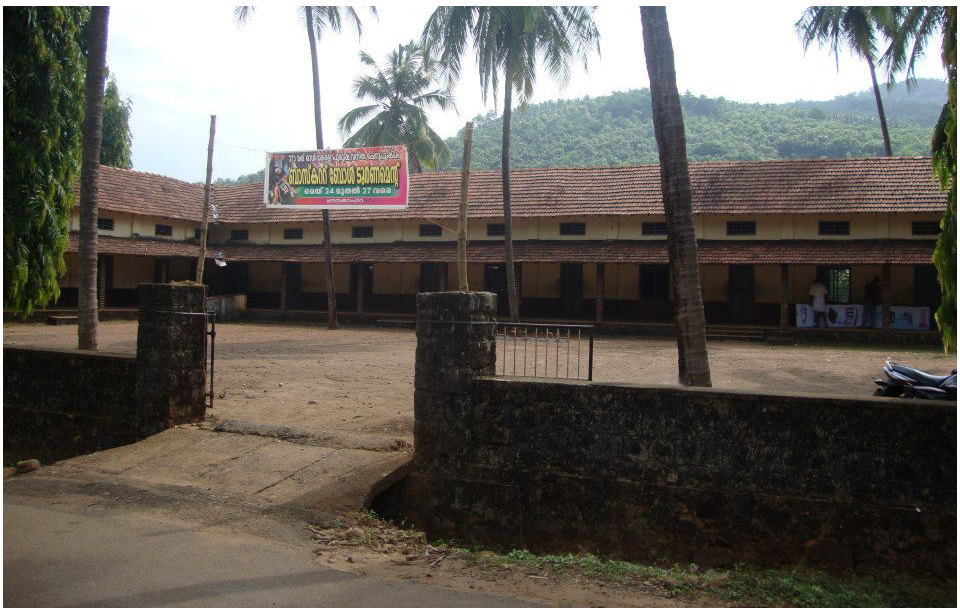
C.H.School

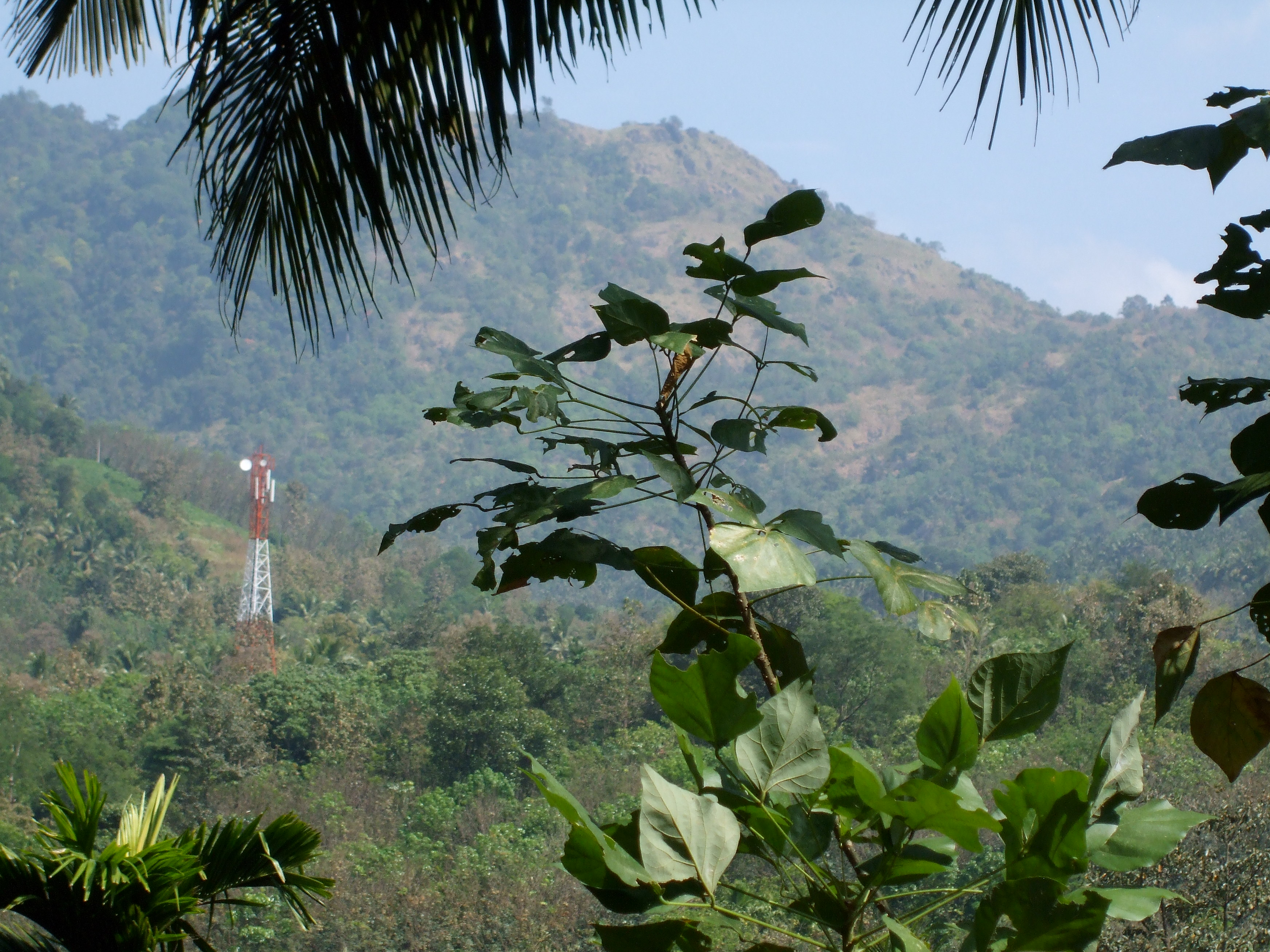
Hill View
