= Ramapuram, Kottayam =

Ramapuram
- Town
- Location in Kerala, India Ramapuram (India)
- Coordinates: 9.7963542°N 76.6600227°E
- Country: India
- State: Kerala
- District: Kottayam

Government
  - Type: Panchayath
  - Body: Ramapuram grama panchayath

Area
  - Total: 54.54 km^{2} (21.06 sq mi)

Population
  - Total: 28,708
  - Density: 526.4/km^{2} (1,363/sq mi)

Languages
  - Official: Malayalam, English
- Time zone: UTC+5:30 (IST)
- PIN: 686576
- Telephone code: 04822
- Vehicle registration: KL-67, KL-35
- Literacy: 95%
- Website: http://lsgkerala.in/ramapurampanchayat/

Ramapuram is a town in the Kottayam district of the Indian state of Kerala.

== Etymology ==
The word "Ramapuram" means "the abode of Lord Rama", the village's chief deity. Ramapuram is unique in the sense that it houses the temple of Rama as well as his three brothers in a radius of just 3.5 km. Lakshmana at Koodappulam, Bharata at Amanakara and Shatrughna at Methiri. Because of this, the village is a Hindu Pilgrimage center too. Devotees mostly visit the temples in Karkadakam, during the month of 'Ramayana'.

== Temples ==
Sree Rama Temple is situated here at Ramapuram in Kottayam district. The nearby village Koodappulam is known for its Sri Lakshmana swami temple. Ancient ten Nair taravads of Kerala-Mutikat, Parakkat, Pariyath, Arakkal, Kappamadathil, Pathirakkattil, Kaanattu Kannampalakkal etc. are in Koodappulam. Also the Ancient Ezhava Taravds of Kerala - (ThazhatheEdappattu - Edappttu - KizhakkeEdappttu), Menamparambil, Kariythumpara, Kuzhivelil, Karathankal, etc. are in Ramapuram.

== Churches ==
The centuries-old twin churches of Ramapuram are two of the oldest churches in Kerala. The complex consists of a smaller church dedicated to St. Augustine and a larger one dedicated to the Blessed Virgin. The church dedicated to St. Augustine dates to 1450 while the one dedicated to the Blessed Virgin was erected in 1864. The structures represent an architectural style from the early colonial period, with the Persian facade influencing the overall Portuguese style. The Roman columns and the veranda are also rare features from the period. The new church building which has three levels is surrounded by 9 steeples. Greek, Portuguese and German architectural styles are used for the facade of the church. It was consecrated by Major Archbishop of Syro Malabar Catholic Church Cardinal Mar George Alencherry on January 13 2019. Now the Ramapuram church, under the Palai Diocese is the Biggest Catholic Church in Asia and India as well as Biggest 'Syro Malabar Catholic' Church in the World.

== Schools ==
The house of the poet Sri Ramapuratthu Varrier has been converted to an Upper Primary School, known as Ramapuratthu Varrier Memorial Upper Primary School. There are also many schools run by the church such as St.Augustine's higher secondary school for boys, Sacred Heart high school for girls and St.Joseph's U.P School for boys and girls in Vellilappilly. Chavara CMI International is an ICSE school at Ramapuram. Alphonsa English Medium school, a lower primary school, is also situated in Ramapuram . The Mar Augusthinose College, an arts, science and business college is also situated in Ramapuram. The college is affiliated with Mahatma Gandhi University, Kottayam.

== Economy ==
Ramapuram is now a well developed growing town. Known for its natural environment, the village has acres of rubber plantations. The Panchayath ground of Ramapuram was one of the locations for the film 'Kabadi Kabadi'(starring Kalabhavan Mani and Rambha).

== Visiting Ramapuram ==
Ramapuram is located 12 km from Pala town on the main road to Koothattukulam and 17 km from Thodupuzha, situated between the hills of the Western Ghats. It can only be reached by road. No other transport is presently available or planned.

== Scenic Sites Near Ramapuram ==
- Kurinji Koomban – Located 5 km from Ramapuram, it is a circular hill with abundant caves. Nearby this hill are the Vellamneekipara waterfalls. There is motorable road to the foothills, where one may hike to the falls.
- Kuruvankunnu – Located 5 km from Ramapuram, it is situated to the east of Kurinji Koomban. Water is available even in summer. Visitors must be wary of avalanches.
- Mayiladimpara – Located in Nedumala, there are two huge rocks on this 4–5-acre site.
- Parunthanmala – It has the highest point in the region (called Koozhamala) located 4 km west of Ramapuram through several rubber plantations.
- Fathimagiri – This is lower in height
- Pampanal Waterfalls – It's a waterfall situated at Manathoor, Pizhaku. It's a three stepped waterfall. It is 8km east of Ramapuram. Ramapuram – Manathoor (Pizhaku) – Karimkunnam Shortcut Road – Pampanal waterfalls.

== Cultural Information ==
Ramapurathu Warrier, (1703–1753) the author of Kuchela Vritham Vanchippattu, adorned the courts of Maharaja Marthanda Varma, the maker of the former State of Travancore and his successor Kartika Tirunal Rama Varmawa. Kuchela Vritham Vanchippattu is the most famous boat-song in the language. Composed entirely in the Dravidian meter 'natonnata,' it is a popular classic which retells the story of Kuchela, an old classmate of Sri Krishna, going to Dwaraka to pay homage to him. In the poem, the poet specifically refers to King Marthanda Varma and also describes the circumstances under which he came to write the poem.

The author, social reformer and political reformer Lalithambika Antharjanam, whose novel 'Agnisakshi'(1980) won the Kerala Sahitya Academy award, lived in Ramapuram.

In Oct. 2005, Malayalam writer Krishnan Parappally was chosen for the annual literary award instituted by the Malayalam magazine Jwala, published in Mumbai. The award was conferred on him for his biography of philosopher and literary critic Sukumar Azhikode. Parappally, born in Ramapuram in 1921, has 19 anthologies of poems to his credit and is based in Mumbai. New generation Malayalam Poet Santhosh Pala hails from Kurinji of Ramapuram village (now resides in United States). His poetry has been well received by poetry lovers, receiving the Ankanam award, FOKANA award and many other awards for his poetry works. His first collection of Poems "Communist Pacha” was published in 2011. He also published a second book, in 2018, called “Kattuveeshunnidam”. His poems are published by mainstream publishers in Kerala.

== Sports ==
Ramapuram has produced many sportsmen who has represented it in various district, state and national events. It is known for volleyball which used to be a passion for the natives. It has a number of public stadiums which are active during evenings and weekends. One of these is Panchayat Stadium which is used for football and cricket by the local people and has been the venue of many local tournaments. It also has a volleyball court and basketball and a bigger stadium in the campus of St. Augustines High School, Ramapauram.

== Notable people ==
- Ramapurathu Warrier(born 1703) Malayalam poet
- M. M. Jacob Indian Politician
