= Perunilam =

Village in Kerala, India

- village
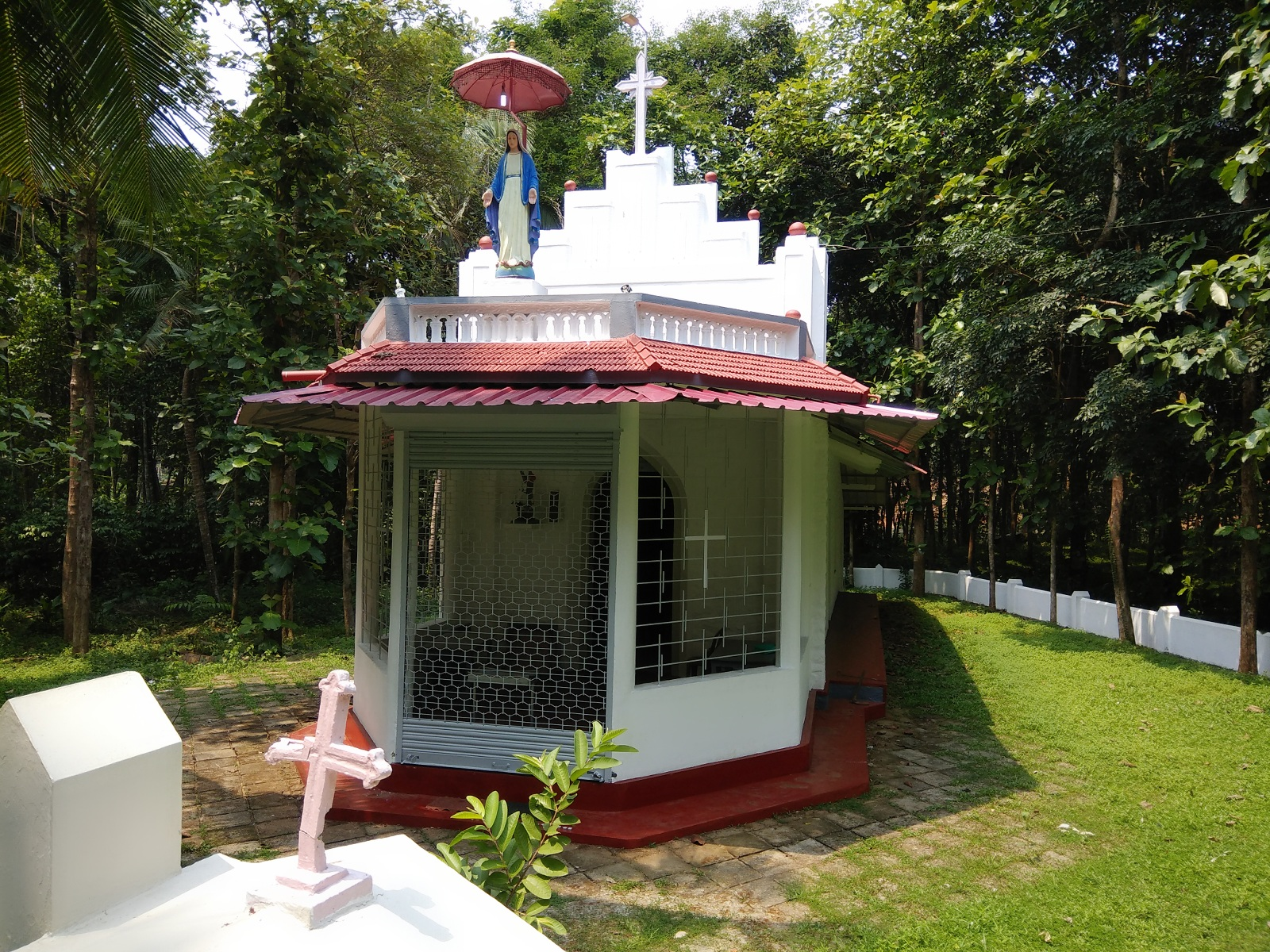
- Perunilam Kurishupally

- Location in Kerala, India Perunilam (India)
- Coordinates: 9°39′57″N 76°47′43″E
- Country: India
- State: Kerala
- District: Kottayam

Government
  - Type: Local Body
  - Body: Poonjar

Languages
  - Official: Malayalam, English
- Time zone: UTC+5:30 (IST)
- PIN: 686581 (Poonjar)
- Telephone code: 04822
- ISO 3166 code: IN-KL
- Vehicle registration: KL-35
- Nearest city: Poonjar, Aruvithura
- Kerala Legislature Constituency: Poonjar
- Lok Sabha Constituency: Pathanamthitta
- Climate: Typical Kerala Climate

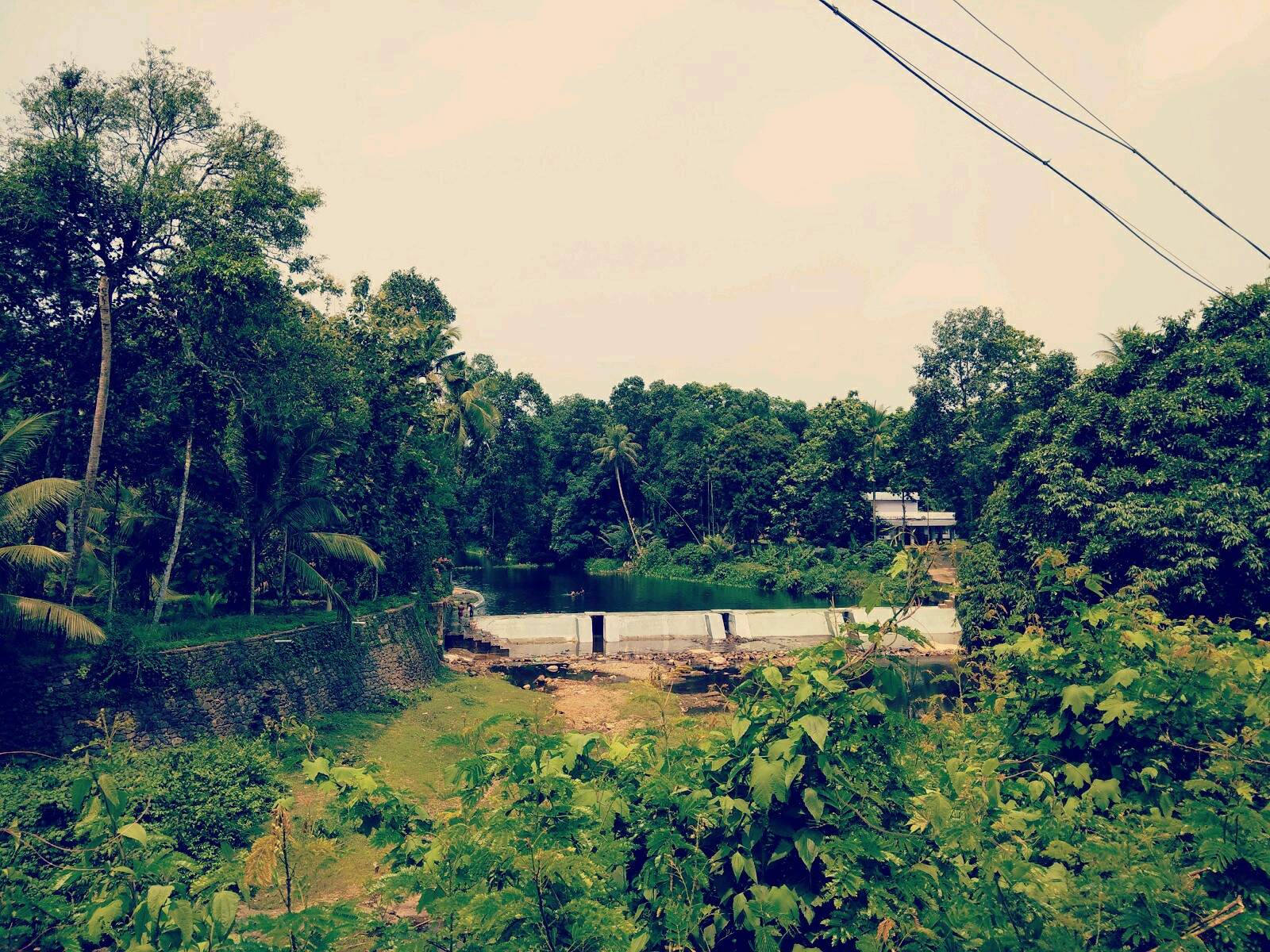
Perunilam Check Dam

Perunilam is a small village/hamlet in Meenachil Taluk in the Kottayam district of the Indian state of Kerala. It comes under Poonjar Panchayath. It belongs to South Kerala Division.

== Geography ==
It is located 44 km East from District headquarters Kottayam. 2.5 km from Erattupetta and 149 km from State capital Thiruvananthapuram. Nearby cities include Erattupetta, Palai, Kanjirapally, Bharananganam, Aruvithura, and Kottayam.

== Economy ==
The main agricultural crop is rubber.

== Culture ==
The popular Christian Pilgrim Centre Bharananganam (St Alphonsa Shrine Church and Pilgrim Centre ) and St. George's Syro-Malabar Catholic Forane Church, Aruvithura is near Perunilam. Perunilam Kurishupally is located in Perunilam. Malayalam is the local language. Kottayam Rail Way Station is a major railway station 40 km near to Perunilam.

== Amenities ==
Attractions include Poonjar dynasty (Poonjar Palace), Aruvithura Vallyachan Mala, Vengathanam Aruvi (Chennad Malika), and Wagamon.
