= Cherpunkal =

Cherpunkal ചേർപ്പുങ്കൽ
- Town
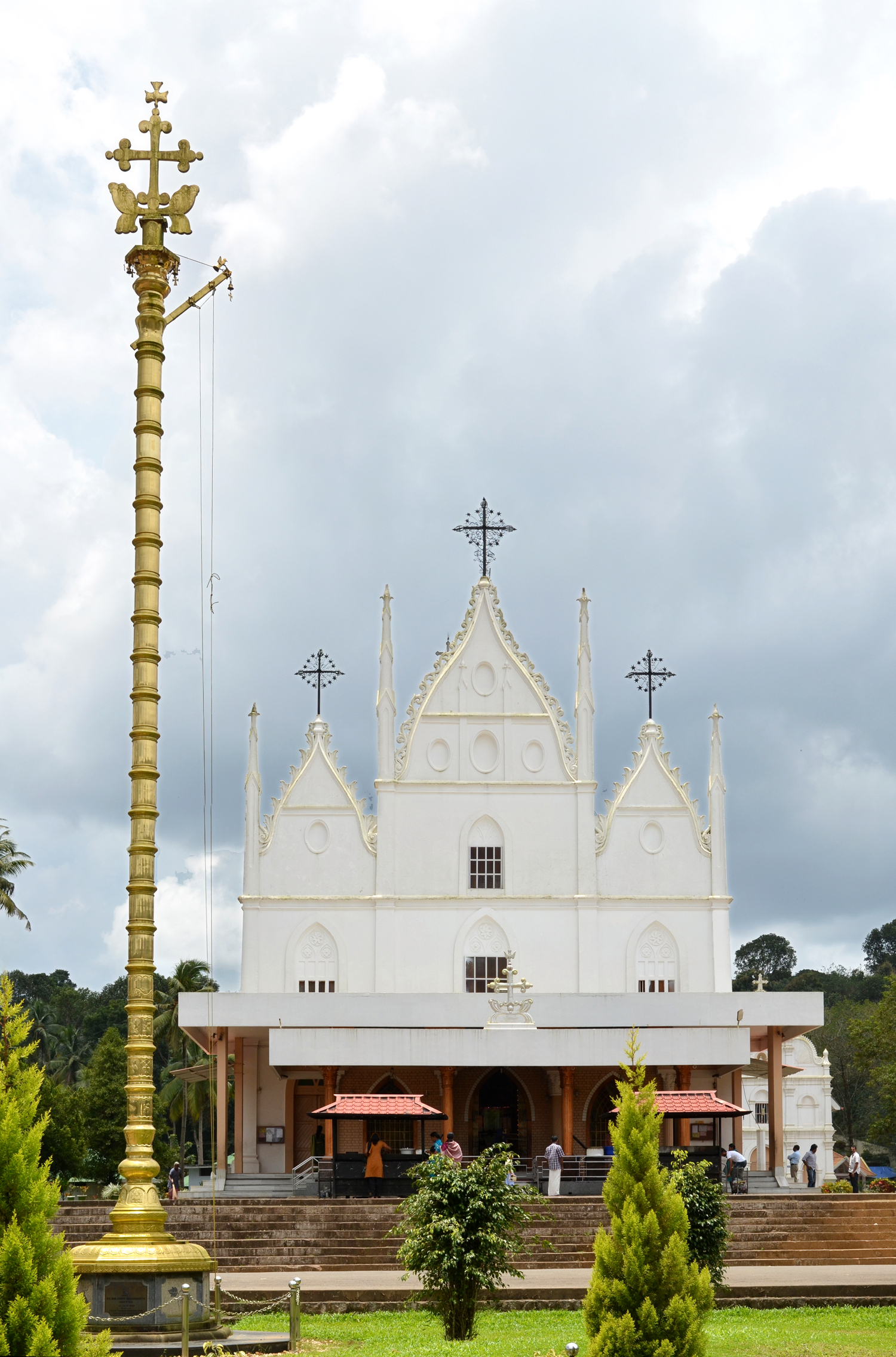
- Cherpunkal Holy Cross Church

- Location in Kerala, India Cherpunkal (India)
- Coordinates: 9°41′23″N 76°38′6″E
- Country: India
- State: Kerala
- District: Kottayam

Languages
  - Official: Malayalam, English
- Time zone: UTC+5:30 (IST)
- PIN: 686 584
- Vehicle registration: KL- 35
- Nearest city: pala
- Lok Sabha constituency: kottayam
- Climate: Tropical (Köppen)
- Website: Holy Cross Church Mutholath Auditorium A/c

Cherpunkal is a small town in the Kottayam district of Kerala State in India on the Kottayam-Palai Road, seven kilometers from Pala city.

Cherpunkal is famous for Mar Sleeva Forane Catholic Church, believed to have been established by Thomas the Apostle. It is also believed that St.Thomas left his sandals there while taking a bath in a nearby Meenachil River.

== Mar Sleeva Forane Church, Cherpunkal ==
On the southern banks of the Meenachil River is the Holy Cross Forane Church of Cherpunkal is situated. Mar Sleeva is a Syriac word which means the Holy Cross. The church belongs to the Syro Malabar Catholic Church and under the diocese of Palai. The church premises sprawl along the river side and include the old and new churches, the presbytery, the old and new parish halls and the swanky buildings housing the High School, the Higher Secondary School and the Bishop Vayalil Memorial Holy Cross College with the terraced church cemetery in the background right across the Kezhuvamkulam road. The open yard in front of the church can accommodate thousands of people during festivals. The church is visited by thousands of people from far and wide during festivals and on first Fridays.

=== Relics ===
The relics of St. Sebastian, St. George, St. Alphonsa, Blessed Thevarparampil Kunjachan and of the Holy Cross are kept in the church and are taken out in a procession on feast days. The Holy Cross Church has four chapels at Cherpunkal town, the western junction of the town, Kezhuvamkulam and Neyyoor in addition to a Grotto of the Blessed Virgin Mary at Chempilavu and St Thomas Monument on the bank of Meenachil river

=== Parishes ===
The Mar sleeva Forane Church Cherpunkal is under the Syro-Malabar Eparchy of Palai It is a forane church and it has 7 parishes under its jurisdiction. It has become a pilgrim centre because of its association with St.Thomas.

=== History ===
Tradition has it that the stone laid by St.Thomas ultimately led to the founding of the Mar sleeva Forane Church at Cherpunkal. In the course of his gospel preaching he landed at the Moonnupeedikayil ferry and interacted with the people there. As a result of this contact, members of five families were converted to Christianity and baptized. A cross was believed to have been set up at a place chosen by the apostle. The place where the cross stood, with the passage of time, came to be called Cherpunkal. It is believed that this cross was instrumental in working numerous miracles. In response to several requests sent abroad, a crucifix embossed on a single piece of wood arrived. In accordance with an order issued by the meenachil karthavu, the church built on the northern bank of the Meenachil River was shifted to the southern bank. The foundation stone for the new church was laid on 14 September 1096. The land for the construction of the church was donated by Kallampally Namboothiri, a landlord. The old church, which is still preserved, was built in the 15th century to accommodate the increasing number of believers. The routine of offering the Holy Mass on the main altar for the Kallampally family on 14 September every year still continues. The old church and the presbytery were constructed under the supervision of Rev. Philipose Vattamattathil. The new church was blessed in 1911 by the vicar general Msgr. Cyriac Kannamkary during the tenure of the Vicar Apostolic Mar Thomas Kurialacherry.

=== Relevance of the Church ===
Cherpunkal Holy Cross Forane Church is one of the big churches in the Palai Diocese. The church was built in the Gothic style. The façade of the church has three arches with a tall belfry behind them; the altar is decorated with gold-coloured patterns; the chancel is decorated with unfading pictures. In 1958 during the vicariate of Fr. Thomas Plakkat the ceiling work for the roof of the church was done. The portico of the church was built during the time of office of Fr. Francis Mailadoor.

=== Festivals ===
Every year there is a celebration in commemoration of the stone-laying of the church on the southern bank of the Meenachil River on 14 September, which happens to be the feast of the glorification of the Holy Cross. The most important celebration of the Holy Cross Church is in commemoration of the circumcision of Jesus. The long celebrations commence with the hoisting of the flag and the subsequent nativity celebrations on 25 December. During the eight days that follow there are devotional services, processions with due ceremonials from all the four corners of the parish, pyrotechnics and numerous artistic performances. The church and its premises are filled to capacity by devotees during the prayers that ring out the old year and ring in the New Year as well as during the ceremonial Holy Mass. A memorial was erected, though after many centuries, in commemoration of the place where the apostle marked the site of the church with a sandal. A plot of land which was in the possession of Mathew Kurian Valepeedikayil was handed over to the church in 1927 on the condition of a yearly High Holy Mass for the members of his family and on this land Rev. Dr. Augustine Kachiramattam built the memorial in 1988. It was blessed by the Bishop of Palai, Mar Joseph Pallickaparampil.

=== Pilgrim Center ===
The Holy Cross Church at Cherpunkal is now a renowned pilgrim centre. The church is said to have been started by St.Thomas by erecting a cross. The devotion to Infant Jesus, the Novena associated with it and the offering of gingelly oil and gold made this church a pilgrim destination. The long tradition of offering oil at the Holy Cross Church is based on a bible-centered Jewish observance.

Special services are held on the first Friday of every month, with the offering of oil for the ever burning lamp. The novena prayers, which give solace and hope to many, were prepared by the assistant vicar Fr. Jose Eanthanal in 1977. It is customary for devotees to offer gold items to Infant Jesus.

=== Various developments ===
Fr.Jacob Mannalal serving as vicar during 1969-70 divided the parish into 30 wards. The representatives from these 30 wards who assemble once every month with the vicar in the chair, take decisions about the administration of the church. In order to overcome the difficulties caused by the bifurcation of the parish into two parts by the Meenachil River a bridge was built under the leadership of Fr. Francis Mailadoor with the help of contributions from the church and the parishioners. A three storied building was constructed in 1988 for the high school that started functioning with the 8th standard in 1982. In 1984 the church was elevated to the status of a Forane church. In 1991 Bishop Mar Joseph Pallickaparampil blessed the chapel built by Fr. Cyriac Kunnel in the Cherpunkal town. When the number of devotees offering oil increased the present portico was built and the statue of Infant Jesus was placed in the portico in front of the main door of the church and a new lamp was erected for devotees to pour oil. The Bishop Vayalil memorial Holy Cross College was started in 1995 with the concurrence of the government and the Mahatma Gandhi University. In 2002 the St. Sebastian church was completed at Kidangoor on a plot of one acre and eight cents of land donated by Fr. Sebastian Chempakassery who belonged to the Cherpunkal parish. A new block was built in 1998 to house the newly introduced higher secondary course. The blessing of the Mar Sleeva Parish Hall took place in 2001. As an extension of the old presbytery, a two-storied block was constructed under the leadership of Fr. Abraham Kaniyampadikal to house the vicar's office on the first floor and the Infant Jesus stall on the ground floor for the sale of religious books and other articles. Though the stall was started in 2005 the administrative block had been completed in 2002. In 2006 the nursery school which had been functioning in the old parish hall was shifted to the new school building. In 2006 a new three-storey building was constructed for the BVM Holy Cross College under the guidance of Fr. Abraham Kaniyampadikal. Its inauguration took place in April 2006. Though the feast of the purification of Our Lady on the first of January is the chief celebration, there are other celebrations also including the feast commemorating the foundation day of the church on 14 September, the feast of St. Alphonsa in July and the feast of St. Joseph in March. In addition to these celebrations the feasts of St. Sebastian, St. George and Our Lady of Sorrows are also observed.

== SS. Peter and Paul Church, Cherpunkal ==
Sanctuary (Madbaha) of SS. Peter and Paul Knanaya Catholic Church at Cherpunkal.

The members of the Saints Peter and Paul Church at Cherpunkal are Knanaya Catholics belonging to the Catholic Archdiocese of Kottayam under Syro Malabar Catholic Church. The parish was established in 1914 at Kalloor property and is relocated on 14 February 1993 at Cherpunkal Junction. The parish now serves 1050 members belonging to 210 families.

=== Feasts ===
The main feast of the parish is of Saint Sebastian that is celebrated on the last Sunday of the season of Denha. Other feasts that the parish celebrates are feast of Saint George on 24 April, Saint Peter and Saint Paul on 29 June, and Nativity of Mary on 8 September. The parish conducts 12-hour adoration on 21 December.

=== Organizations ===
The parish has the following pious associations: Society of Saint Vincent de Paul, Cherupushpa Mission League, Legion of Mary, and Association of the Holy Childhood. Knanaya Catholic Youth League (KCYL) and Knanaya Catholic Women Association (KCWA) are the lay associations of the parish. Parish also has 7 Koodarayogams (ward prayer groups).

=== Shrines ===
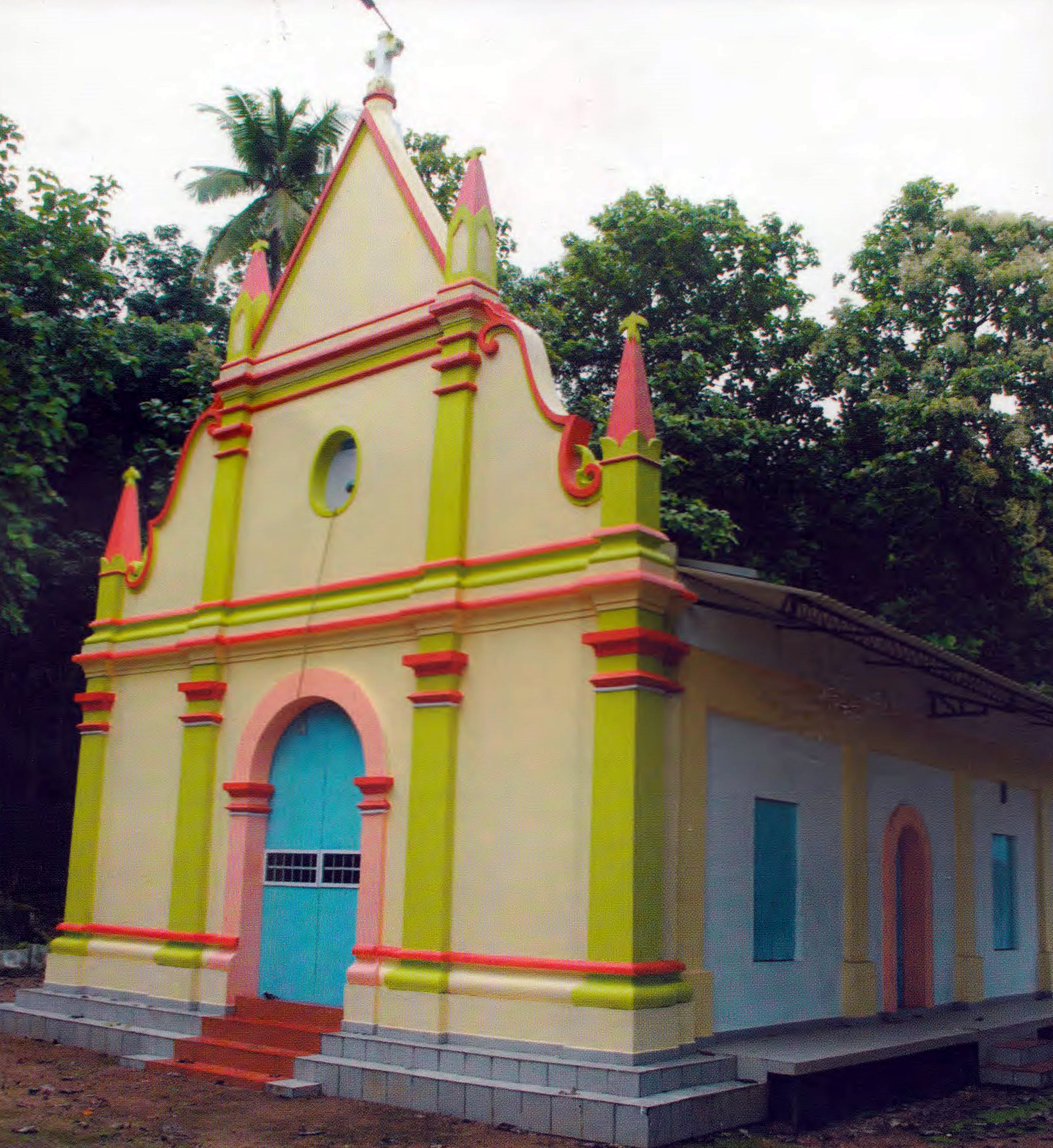
SS. Peter and Paul Old Church now used as a shrine and cemetery church

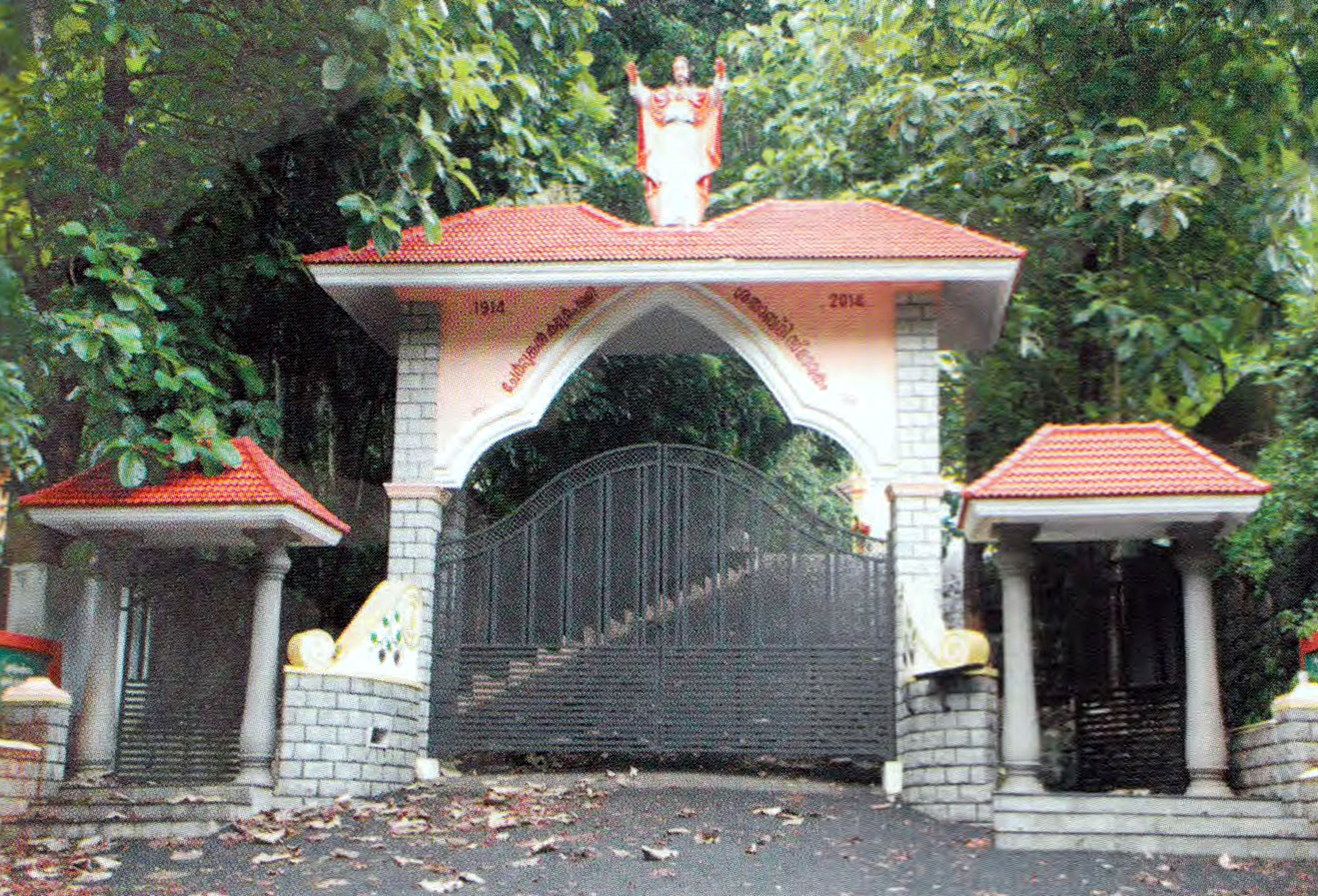
Entrance Gate to the Cemetery and old Church.

The old church at Kalloor property is now a shrine and cemetery church. The cemetery of the parish is close to this shrine. The entrance to this old church is reconstructed at the supervision and expense of Stany Joseph Mulavelippurath.

Parish also has a shrine of St. Sebastian beside Cherpunkal-Palayam Road. The land for this shrine was donated by Ouseph Joseph Mulavelippurath and the renewed shrine was constructed at the expense of his son Stany Mulavelippurath. The Auxiliary bishop of Kottayam Mar Joseph Pandarasseril blessed this shrine on 1 February 2008.

=== Convent ===
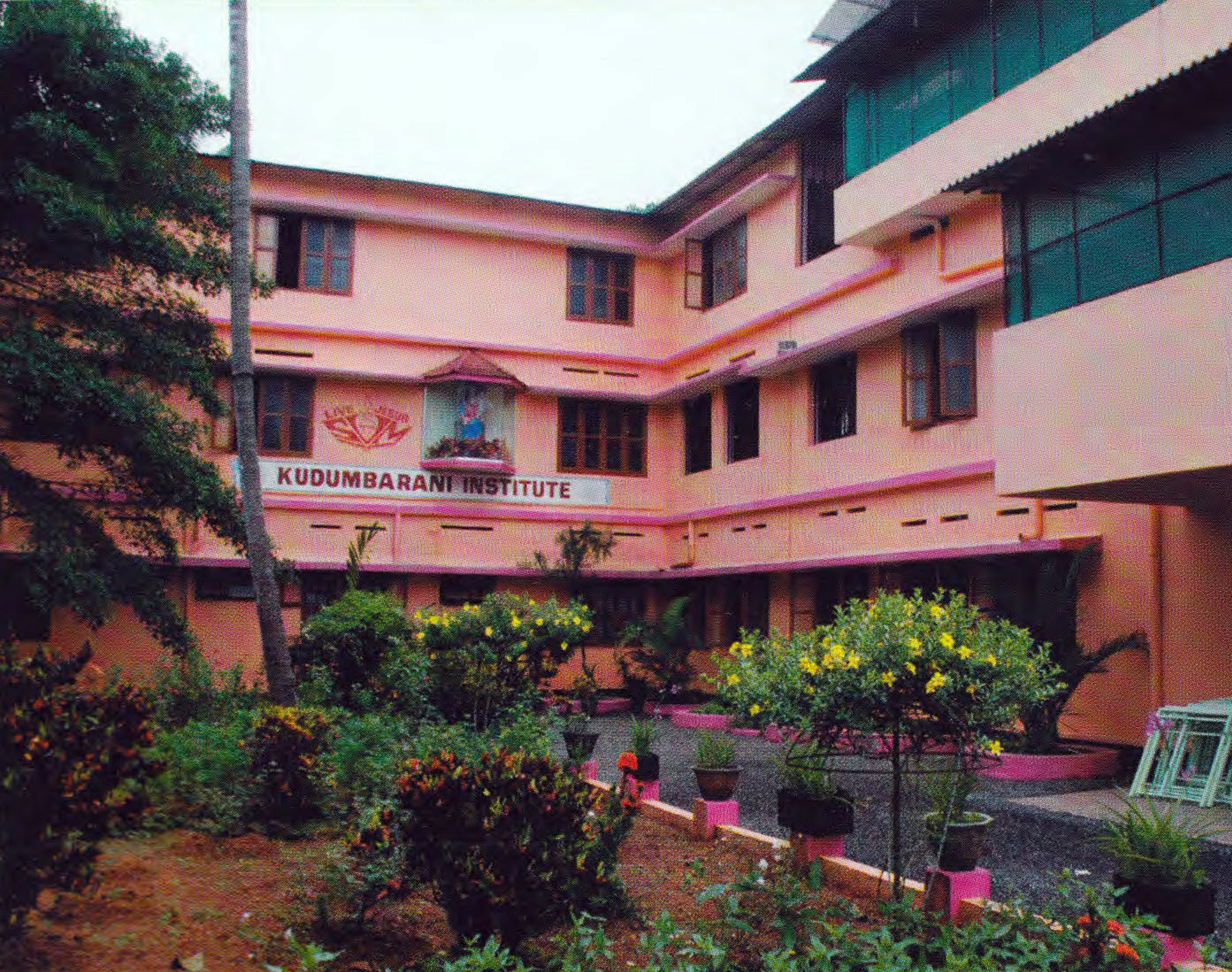
Kudumarani Institute administered by sisters of Visitation Convent at Cherpunkal.

The parish has had a Visitation Convent since 13 July 1995. The convent started a tailoring school and training for ladies on home nursing. Later sisters started a ladies hostel called Kudumba-rani considering the need of the area. They also serve at Agape Bhavan and Good Samaritan Centre at Cherpunkal, Little Lourde Hospital and St. Mary's Higher Secondary School at Kidangoor. Besides social service, sisters serve in all the pastoral and liturgical activities of the parish.

=== History ===
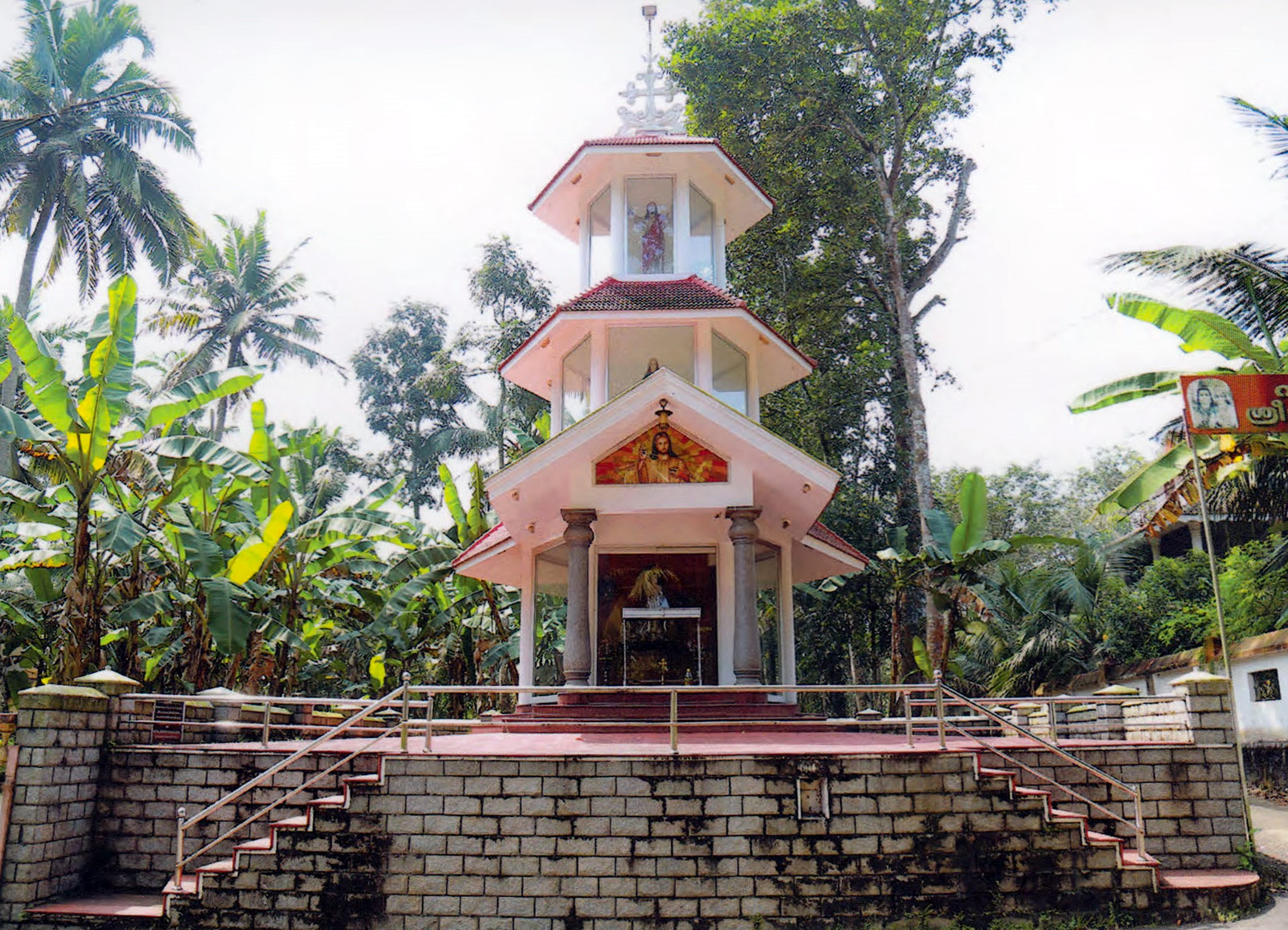
St. Sebastian Shrine at Cherpunkal Palayam roadside.

Centuries ago, a few Knanaya Catholic families migrated to Cheupunkal area. They were members of Paingalam old church established on 8 September 1560 by Knanaya Catholics. After 179 years, the non-Knanaya Catholics who migrated to that area requested to be served by this parish. Their request was granted without any share in the administration of the parish. This situation continued until 1737. While continuing their official membership at Paingalam old church, the Knanaya Catholics at Cherpunkal also used to meet their spiritual needs at Holy Cross Church, Cherpunkal.

The Knanaya Catholics in Cherpunkal area used to have monthly get-together for prayer and social gathering along with food. They also used to collect four chakram (Travancore Rupee) from each family during these meetings. Making use of the fund they raised, they wished to have their own Knanaya Catholic Church at Cherpunkal so that they can avoid difficult journey of six kilometers to Paingalam for services like baptism, wedding, and funeral.

After the establishment of the Diocese of Kottayam on 29 August 1911 exclusively for Knanaya Catholics by Pope Pius X, partition was made between Knanaya and non-Knanaya parishioners of the Paingalam church on 14 November 1912. At that time 1278 members belonged to 225 Knanaya Catholic families and 376 members of 73 families belonged to non-Knanaya families. The estimated value of church building and other properties was Rs. 10,000. The non-Knanaya Catholics got the church and Knanaya Catholics received Rs. 5,000. With that money Knanaya Catholics bought a property at Cherukara hills and constructed a small church, which was blessed by Bishop Mar Matthew Makil on 15 August 1913.Bishop [Makil also laid the foundation stone for a bigger church, which was built under the leadership of Fr. Makil Luke Sr. and consecrated by Bishop Mar Alexander Chulaparambil on 22 February 1922.

During the construction of the Paingalam Cherukara church, the Knanaya Catholics of Cherpunkal approached Bishop Mar Mathew Makil, the then bishop of Kottayam, for permission to construct a separate church for themselves at Cherpunkal; however, this request was not granted. The Knanaya Catholics bought a plot of land with their money collected during their monthly prayer for a Knanaya church at Cherpunkal. Their original intention was to construct the church at Puthettu property. However, because of a government ordinance against constructing any more churches in Kidangoor Village based on an issue arose from the construction of Kindangoor St. Mary's Knanaya Catholic Church, they sold Puthettu property and bought Kalloor property outside the boundary of Kidangoor village across Chakini thodu (ചകിണി തോട്) (Stream leading to Meenachil River).

Since construction of Paingalam Cherukara church was also going on, this church at Cherpunkal did not get any financial support from mother church at that time. There were only 50 Kananaya Catholic families at Cherpunkal. Contributions were collected in cash and labor from the Knanaya Catholics of Cherpunkal. Collections were also received from people of Cherpunkal and nearby villages under the leadership of Varikattu Chandy Chacko. The leaders of this construction were Pandiyamthottil Thomman, Thengumthottathil Ouseph, Mulavelipurath Pothen, Varikattu Chacko, and Mutholath Chacko.

The planning and collection for the church started in 1911, permission for the church construction was received from the bishop in 1913 and the church was blessed as the parish unit of Paingalam Cherukara church in 1914. Vicar of Paingalam Cherukara church, Fr. Makil Luke Senior blessed the church and offered first mass on 29 June 1914 with authorization from Bishop Mar Alexander Chulaparambil.

Fr. Kottoor John Senior was appointed as the first pro-vicar of the church under the Paingalam Cherukara Church. There were discussions on who would be the patron saint of the parish. That was finalized by taking lot as the will of God. Thus, Saint Peter and Saint Paul were selected as patron saints of the parish. This church at Kalloor, Cherpunkal was elevated as a full-fledged parish on 14 March 1919.

There were many unfavorable circumstances for the location of the Kalloor Church that prompted for a relocation of the church to Cherpunkal junction: (1) This church was not at a central location for majority of the parishioners but had to be built there because of the difficulty to get government permission. That restriction was before Indian independence and with democracy that restriction is gone. (2) The church was on a hill with many steps to climb. So it was difficult for the sick and elderly people to reach the church. (3) Later establishment of a rubber processing factory near the church caused bad smell. (4) The parish had a small shrine at Cherpunkal junction.

The parishioners purchased more land adjacent to the shrine on 25 August 1987 and built a new church replacing the shrine. Bishop Mar Kuriakose Kunnacherry laid foundation stone for the construction of the new church at Cherpunkal Junction on 14 January 1990. With great support from the parishioners and generous contribution of others, the church construction was completed under the leadership of Fr. John Kainikkaraparayil. Bishop Mar Kuriakose Kunnacherry consecrated the church 14 February 1993.

The Visitation Congregation of the Archdiocese of Kottayam started their convent at Cherpunkal near SS. Peter and Paul Church Cherpunkal in 1995. A parish hall was also constructed at the back of the church at the initiative of Fr. Abraham Mutholath and leadership of Fr. Mathew Mavelil. A substantial amount was also contributed in memory of Late Chacko Kurian Mutholath by his children.

The first anniversary of the ward meetings (Koodarayogams) was held in a large scale on 19 November 2006. On the same day the vault construction in memory of Late Mr. Mathai and Mrs. Mariamma Valloor donated by their children was blessed by Archbishop Mar Mathew Moolakkatt.

Fr. Abraham Mutholath, a priest from this parish bought 39 cents of land and constructed a building at Agape Junction called Agape Bhavan for social service with special importance to the Community Based Rehabilitation of the physically and mentally disabled or differently abled. This was his contribution to Kottayam Social Service Society as a souvenir of the 25th anniversary of his ordination to priesthood. He later contributed land and building for Good Samaritan Center for the welfare of deaf-blind children. Mutholath Auditorium is also constructed in the same campus under the ownership of Kottayam Social Service Society to support the expenses of Agape Bhavan and Good Samaritan Center. The whole project location is now known as Mutholath Nagar.

== Mutholath Nagar, Cherpunkal ==
Mutholath Nagar is a designated area for social service at Cherpunkal village in Kottayam district between Ettumanoor and Palai. The location is at Cherpunkal on the bypass roadside of Ettumanoor–Palai road.

Main social service institutions at Mutholath Nagar are Good Samaritan Resource Centre, Agape Bhavan and Mutholath Auditorium that are owned and operated by Kottayam Social Service Society (KSSS). KSSS is the official social service department of the Archdiocese of Kottayam.

KSSS is a registered non-profit organization of the Catholic Archdiocese of Kottayam established in 1964 to organize social service activities for all people that are below poverty line. KSSS organizes self-help groups of the marginalized sections such as women, farmers, widows, and disabled. The society aims at empowering the people for development. Kottayam Social Service Society is a pioneer in the Community-based rehabilitation (CBR) for persons with disability in Kerala.

The land for the Mutholath Nagar was donated by M.C. Chacko and Achamma Mutholath and the buildings were sponsored in their memory by Fr. Abraham Mutholath who is from St. Peter and Paul Church, Cherpunkal and is a priest of the Archdiocese of Kottayam. Fr. Abraham Mutholath is the former vicar general of the St. Thomas Syro-Malabar Catholic Diocese of Chicago.

=== Good Samaritan Centre ===
Good Samaritan Resource Centre is located at Mutholath Nagar in Cherpunkal is an Ability Development Centre inaugurated on 21 August 2011 by Minister of Kerala Mr. K.M. Mani and presided by Archbishop Mar Mathew Moolakkatt. This center functions as the State Learning Centre for the Rehabilitation of Deafblind Persons with all types of disabilities. Its services focus on the integral development of persons with disabilities so that they develop their available talents, become self-reliant as much as possible, and generate income for their living if possible. The centre also educate the family of the disabled for a positive attitude towards the disabled member in their family. Good Samaritan Resource Centre is unique in its services, offering holistic care and rehabilitation services for the Persons with Deafblindness and Persons with Multiple Sensory Impairment (MSI).

=== Agape Bhavan ===
Agape Bhavan is situated Agape Junction half kilometer north of Cherpunkal Junction on the side of Cherpunkal-Palayam road. This institution serves the physically and mentally disabled persons and their families. It also has a notebook making unit and paper bag production unit for nearby hospitals that support the disabled and members of the self-help groups in the area. The institution started functioning in a newly constructed classroom on 16 August 2014. The fully constructed building was blessed by Archbishop Mar Kuriakose Kunnacherry in the presence of Mar Mathew Moolakkatt and inaugurated by the then Finance Minister of Kerala Mr. K.M. Mani on 2 January 2006. The land and building were donated by Fr. Abraham Mutholath on the 25th anniversary of his priestly ordination.

=== Mutholath Auditorium ===
Mutholath Auditorium is constructed at Mutholath Nagar for the training and gathering of social workers in the state or local level. This air-conditioned auditorium is also available for service to the public at reasonable facility usage fee. Its revenue is fully used for the maintenance of Good Samaritan Centre and Agape Bhavan at Cherpunkal. This auditorium was blessed and inaugurated by Major Archbishop of the Syro Malabar Church Mar George Cardinal Alencherry 14 February 2017. Mar Mathew Moolakkattu presided over the meeting. On this day Cardinal Alancherry requested Archbishop Mar Mathew Moolakkattu to name the campus, Mutholath Nagar.

=== Impact Centre ===
Impact Centre is an addition at Mutholath Nagar donated by Fr. Abraham Mutholath as part of the Ruby Jubilee celebration of his priestly ordination. This is to provide additional accommodation facility for the training programs at Good Samaritan Centre, It also provides accommodation for visitors from outside for temporary stay for vacation or to make wedding arrangements at the Mutholath Auditorium. Archbishop Mar Mathew Moolakkatt laid foundation stone for Impact Centre on 27 October 2019. After the completion of the building Mar Moolakkatt blessed and inaugurated the Impact Centre on 13 December 2020.

== Gallery ==
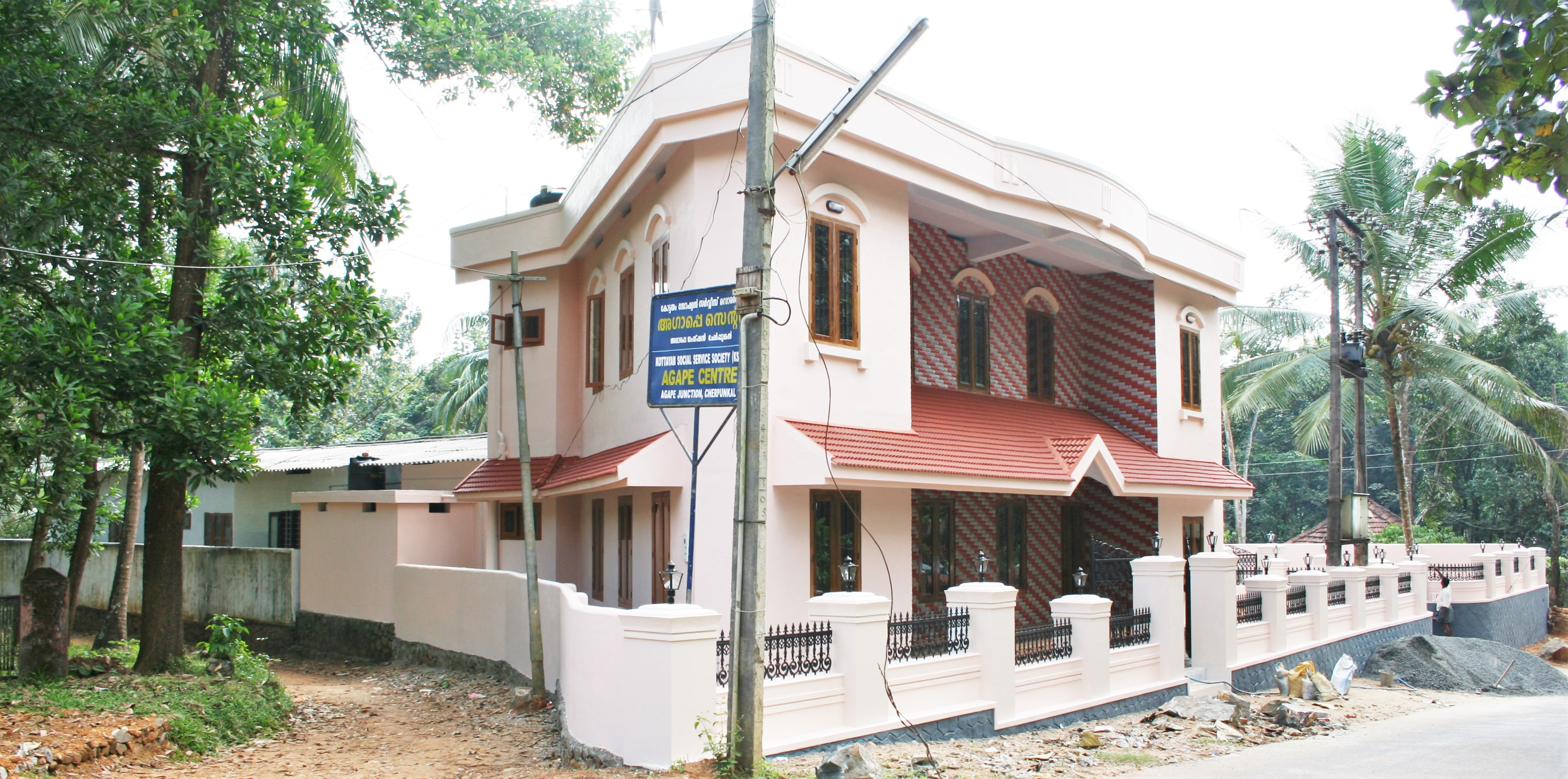
Agape Centre at Cherpunkal for training of Physically and Mentally challenged.

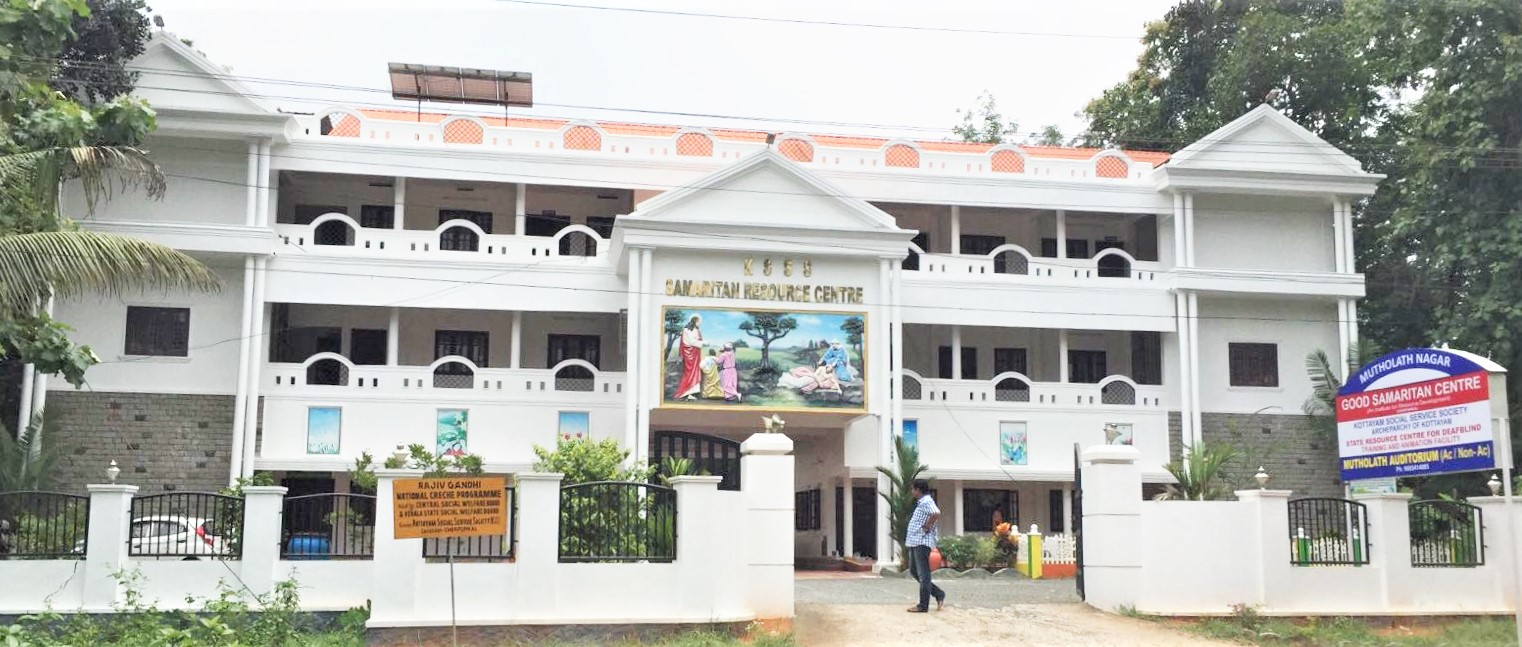
Good Samaritan Centre at Mutholath Nagar, Cherpunkal for the training of blind and deaf and their trainers.

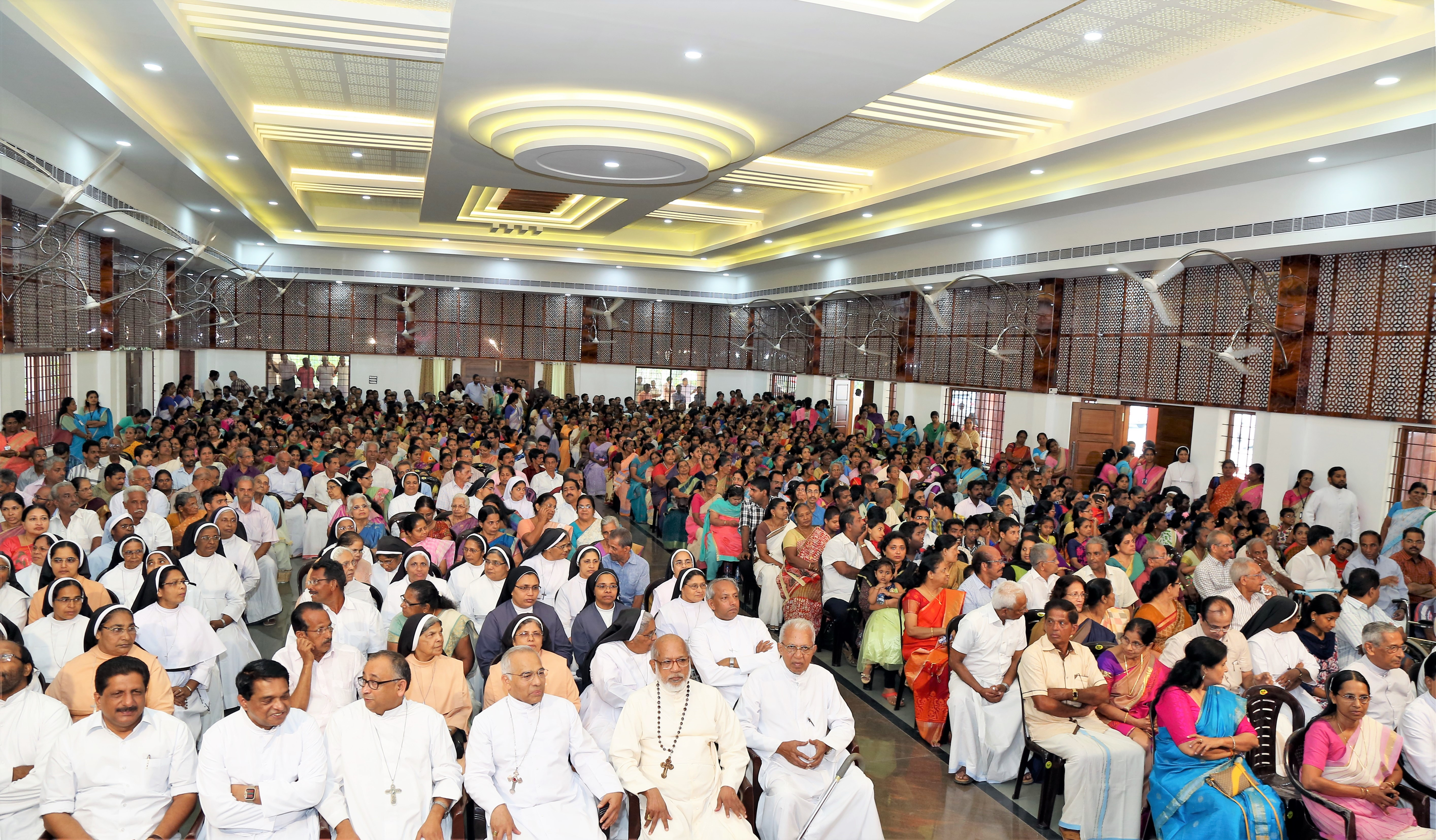
Inaugural meeting of Mutholath Auditorium at Mutholath Nagar, Cherpunkal.

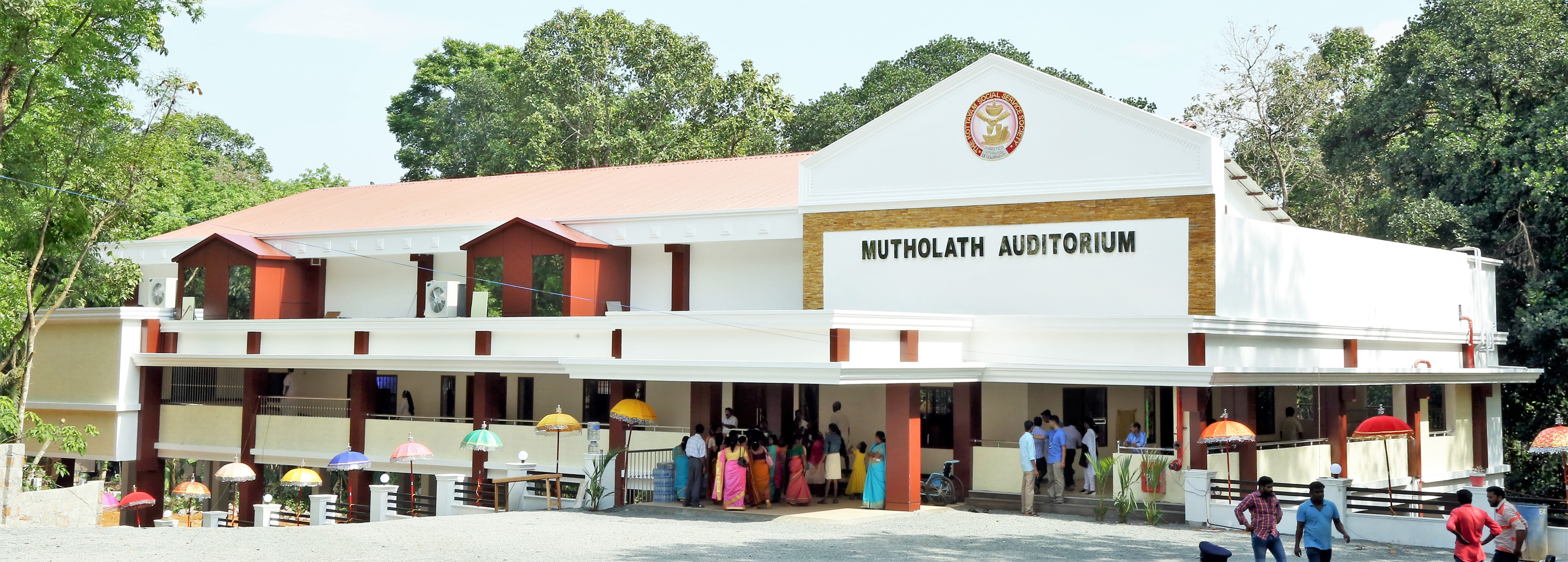
Mutholath Auditorium built to support the blind and deaf programs at Mutholath Nagar, Cherpunkal.

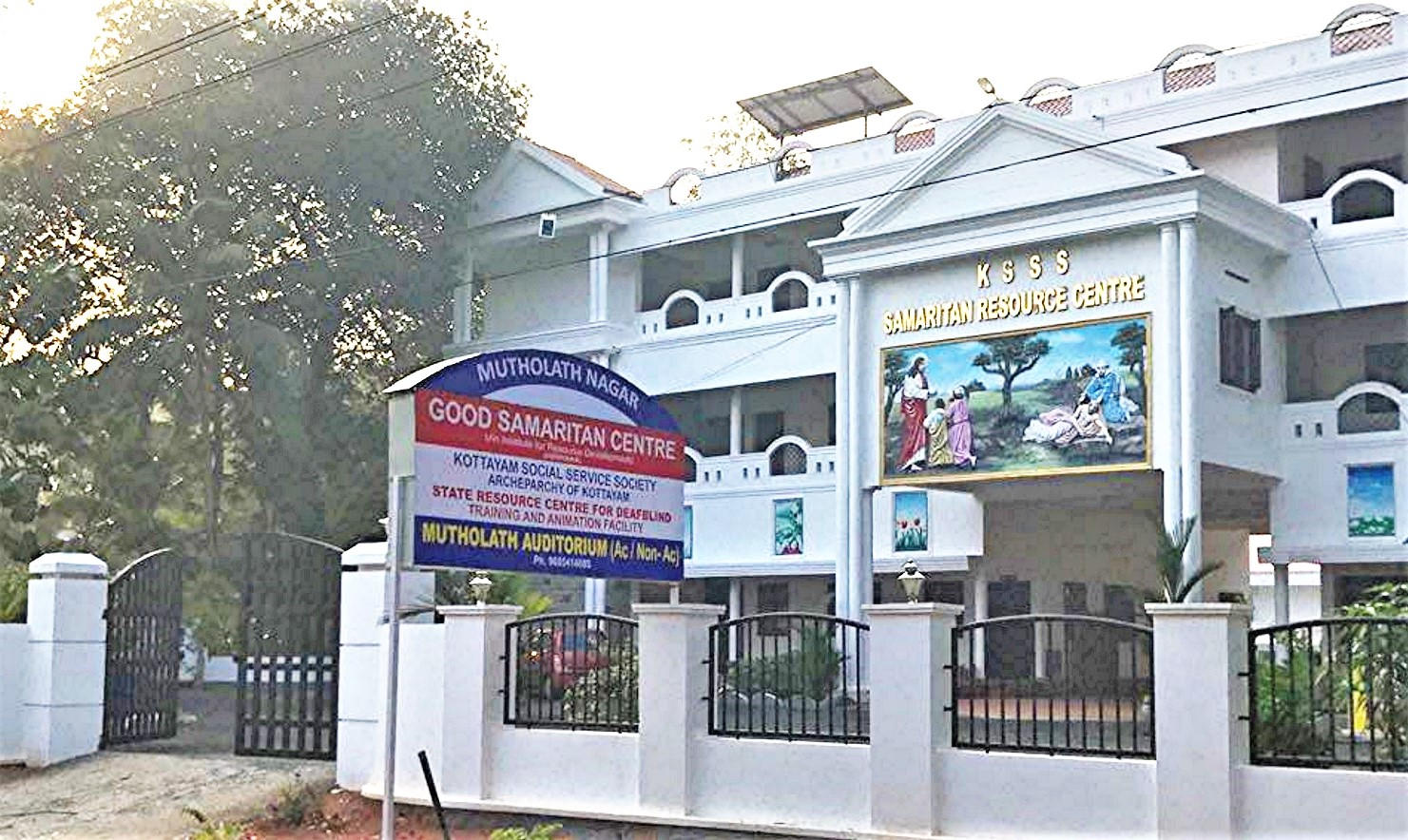
Entrance of Mutholath Nagar that leads to Good Samaritan Centre and Mutholath Auditorium at Cherpunkal.

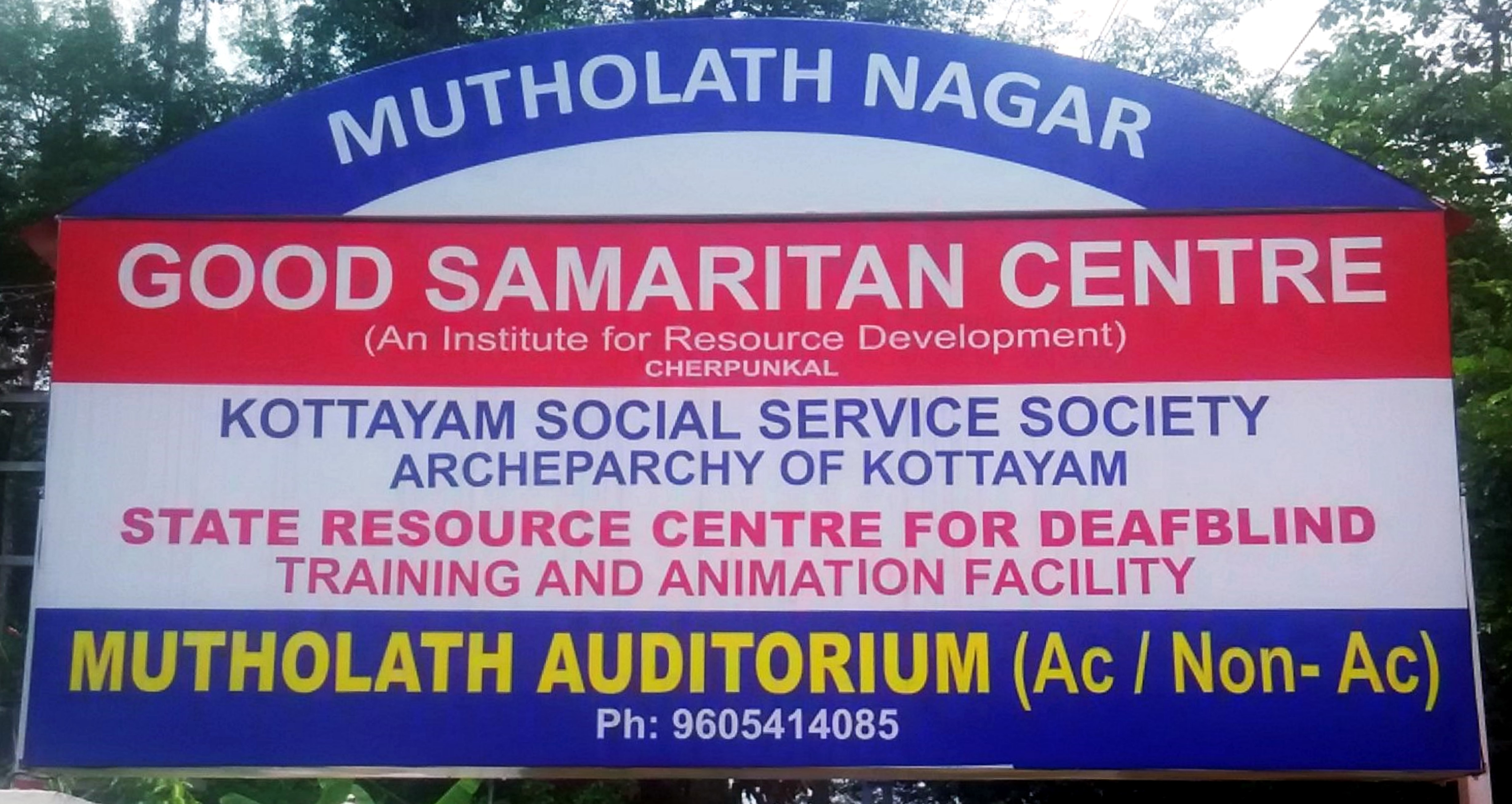
Sign Board of Mutholath Nagar institutions at Cherpunkal.

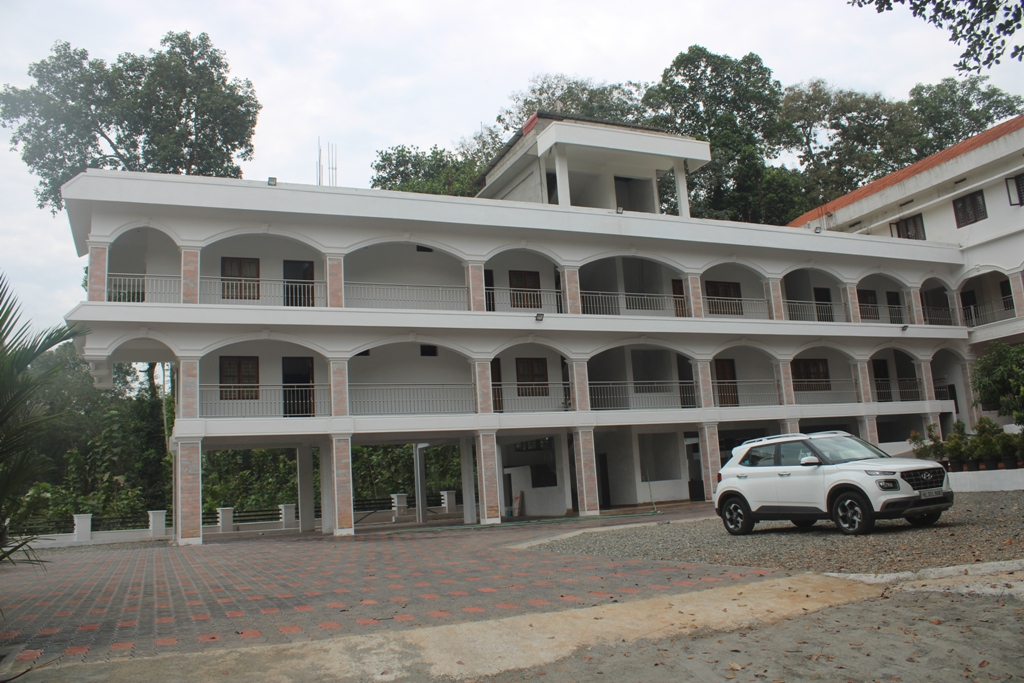
Impact Centre at Mutholath Nagar Cherpunkal inaugurated on 13 December 2020.

== Bibliography ==
- Cherpunkal Unit, KCYL. (2007). Parish Directory – 2007. Cherpunkal: Ss. Peter & Paul Church.
- Mutholath, Fr. Abraham (Ed.) (1993). Consecration Souvenir of Cherpunkal New Church.
- Vicar, Rev. Fr. (2014). Sathabdhi Smaranika 1914-2014. Cherpunkal: SS. Peter & Paul Church.
