= Kunnonny =

- town
- Location in Kerala, India Kunnonny (India)
- Coordinates: 9°39′0″N 76°50′0″E
- Country: India
- State: Kerala
- District: Kottayam

Languages
  - Official: Malayalam, English
- Time zone: UTC+5:30 (IST)
- Postal code: 686582
- Vehicle registration: KL-35

Kunnonny is a village at the foothills of Western Ghats in the Kottayam district of Kerala state, India.

== Location ==
Kunnonny is about 50 km from Kottayam and about 3 km from Poonjar. Pala, Kanjirappally, Erattupetta and Poonjar are the nearest cities of Kunnonny.

== Population ==
Kunnonny is primarily an agricultural village and most people plant Rubber. The population is about 2500. Most of them are farmers and daily wage workers. Recently a lot of people have left from here for work outside Kerala and India. The population consists of Hindus and Christians.

== Important Structures ==
A very old prominent Ayyappa Temple (Sree Dharma Sastha temple dedicated to Lord Ayyappa worshiped as Dharma Sastha) and a church (St. Joseph's Roman Catholic church) are in Kunnonny. The St. Joseph's U P School is managed by the church.

Kunnonny Sree Dharma Sastha Temple is in the village.

== See also ==
- Poonjar
- Kottayam
- Kerala
