= Aruvikkachal Waterfalls =

Waterfalls in Kerala, India

- Location: Pathampuzha, Poonjar, Kottayam district, Kerala, India
- Elevation: 120 ft (37 m)

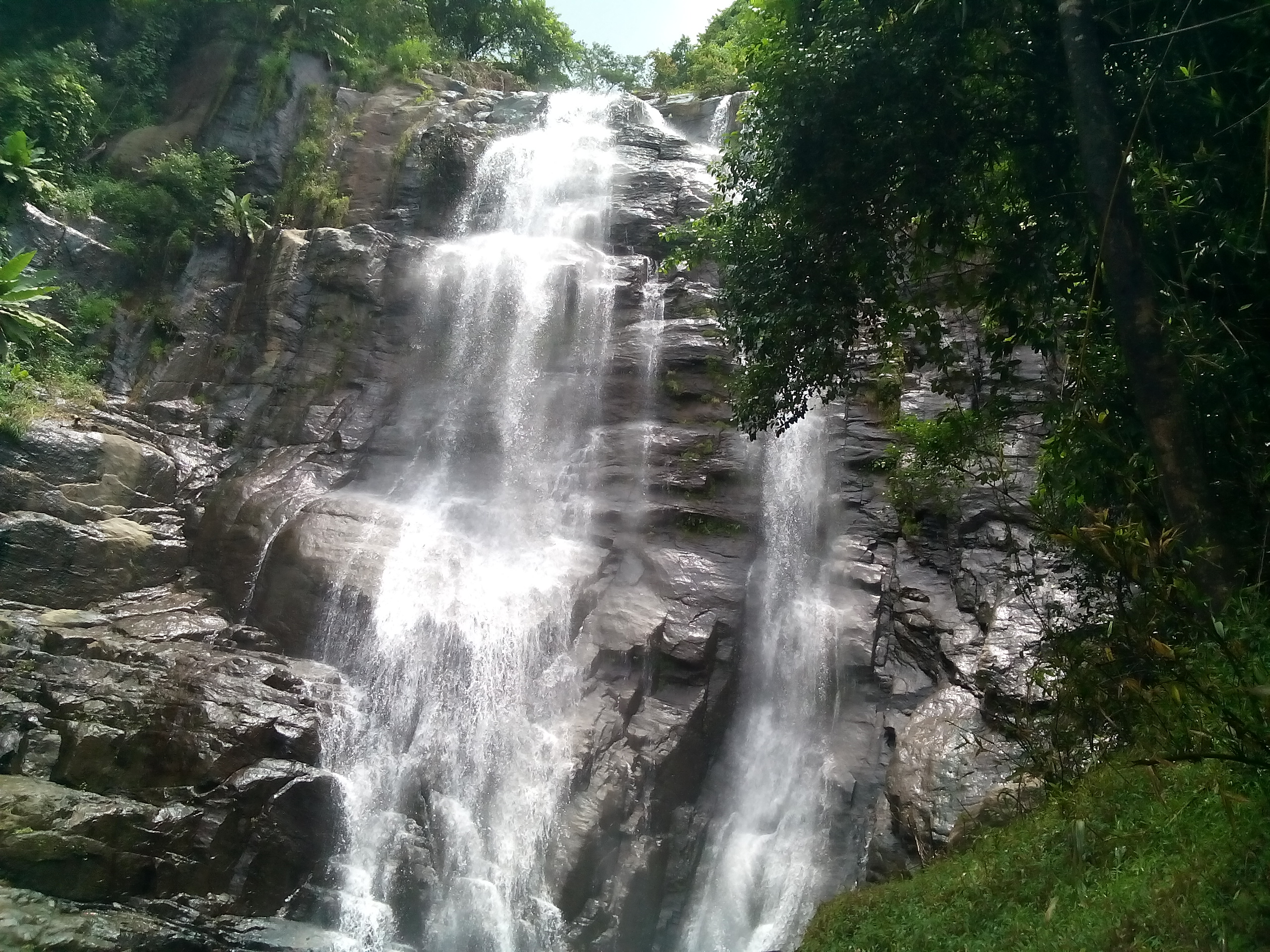
Aruvickachal Waterfall

Aruvikkachal Falls is a waterfall located near Poonjar, Pathampuzha in Kottayam district of Kerala, India. Known for the safety it provides the visitors, it is the highest waterfall in Kottayam district. Aruvikkachal falls is located 13 km from Eratupetta on the Poonjar - Mundakkayam road.
