= Cholathadam =

- Village
- Interactive map of Cholathadam
- Coordinates: 9°39′12″N 76°48′55″E
- Country: India
- State: Kerala
- District: Kottayam

Languages
  - Official: Malayalam, English
- Time zone: UTC+5:30 (IST)
- PIN: 686582
- Vehicle registration: KL-05/KL-35
- Coastline: 0 kilometres (0 mi)
- Nearest city: Poonjar, Mundakayam, Koottickal
- Literacy: 100%%
- Lok Sabha constituency: Pathanamthitta

Cholathadam is a rural area in Kottayam district of the state of Kerala, India. It is part of the village of Poonjar Thekkekara, located 15 km (9.3 mi) from the town Erattupetta. It is flanked by Koottickal on the east and Vengathanam Estate / Chotty on the west.

Cholathadam is situated in Poonjar Mundakkayam Root, 10 km (6.2 mi) from Poonjar and 10 km (6.2 mi) from Mundakkayam. Cholathadam consists of Cholathadam East, Chakkippara and Kaithakulam.

== Landmarks ==
Cholathadam is home to St. Mary's Church, which was newly constructed in 2014. It also has two temples, one nursery school, one DST Convent and the Gramodayam Library.
