= Aruvithura Church =

Coordinates: 09°41′08″N 76°46′40″E

- St.George Forane Church Aruvithura
- Ara pally (Half Church)
- Aruvithura Pally
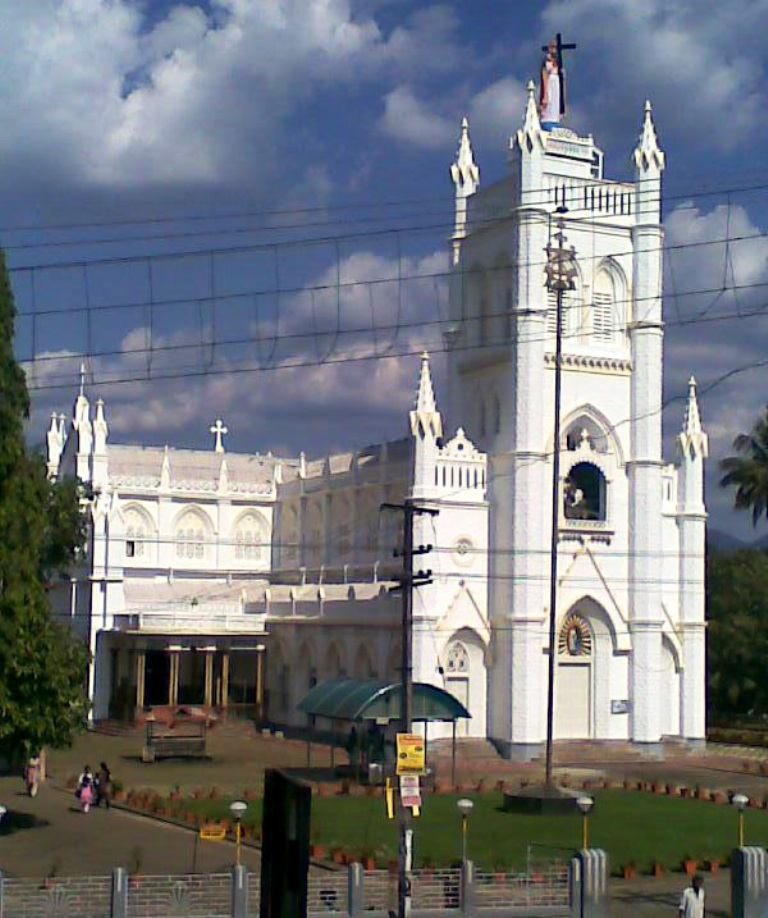
- Aruvithura Church
- Location: Aruvithura, Kottayam
- Website: www.aruvithurapally.com

History
- Founded: AD 151
- Events: Aruvithura Thirunnal

Administration
- District: Kottayam
- Archdiocese: Changanassery
- Diocese: Palai

Clergy
- Archbishop: Mar Thomas Tharayil
- Bishop: Mar Joseph Kallarangattu
- Vicar: Rev Fr. Mathew chandrankunnel

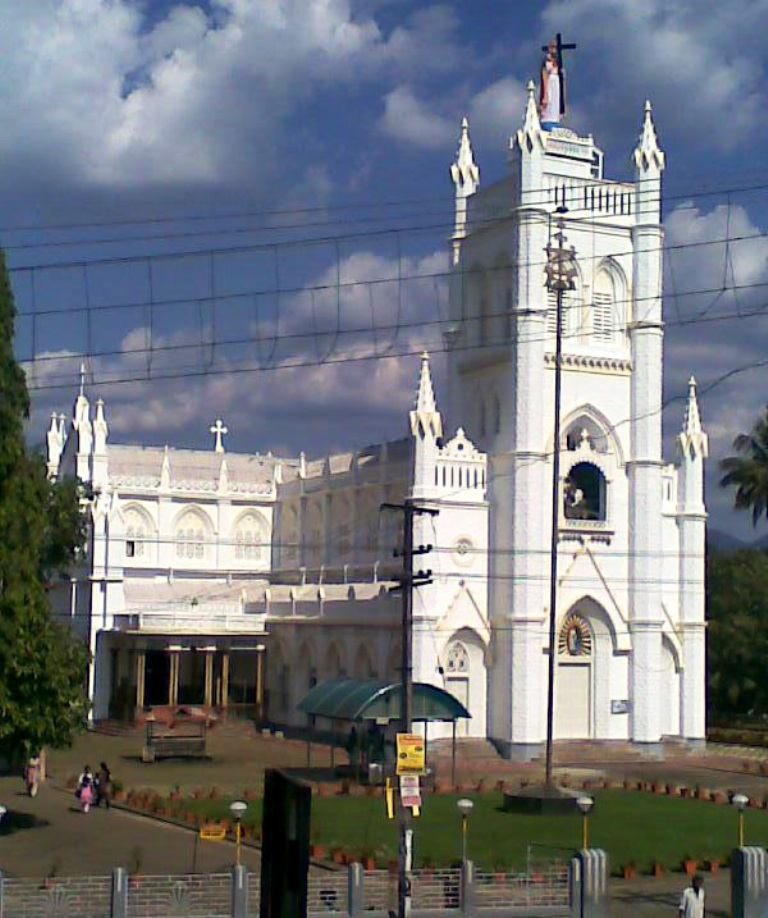
St George Forane Church Aruvithura, Erattupetta

St. George's Syro-Malabar Catholic Forane Church, Aruvithura, more familiarly known as Aruvithura Church, is a Syro-Malabar Catholic church located at Aruvithura, in Kottayam district, Kerala, India. Traditionally, it is believed that the Syrian Catholic Church at Aruvithura was established in the 1st century.

The first edifice of the church at Aruvithura was made of granite stones in the manner of Hindu temples. As it is traditionally believed, St. Thomas, the apostle of India preached the Christian faith in the important and popular villages of Malabar. It is believed that St. Thomas the Apostle of Jesus visited Aruvithura and converted prominent families into Christianity, and lay a cross on the banks of the Meenachil River. This is the first church in the Palai diocese and was built in the 1st century. St. Thomas founded seven and a half churches there. It is reported that the church was rebuilt once or twice before the 16th century. The ancient churches were constructed and maintained by the prominent families in the area until the 16th century. In the beginning of the 16th century a new church was built under the leadership of Kallarackal Kathanar by the prominent families.

The church was first dedicated to the Virgin Mother, assumed into heaven. In the 14th century when either the Nilakkal Church or the Chayal Church founded by St. Thomas was destroyed, several families migrated to Aruvithura bringing with them a statue of St. George. Ever since the advent of the statue, the people began to have unflinching faith in the saint and he has been particularly beneficial in bestowing favours on his followers. Because of the numerous favours obtained through the intercession of the saint, in the 16th century, the church was dedicated to him and his statue was placed in the central niche above the main altar. As a result, St. Mary's church Aruvithura became known as St. George's Church Aruvithura.

The 16th-century church was demolished in 1951 but the sanctuary with its vaulting within the right transept of the cruciform church was preserved to enshrine the statue of St. George, its second patron. Some believe the statue to be miraculous. The church is a cruciform building in the Gothic style, facing to the west towards Jerusalem. It was completed in 1952.

The St. George Church is famous for its feast, known locally as Aruvithura Thirunal. The celebration typically takes place over three days in April, most commonly from the 23rd to the 25th, and attracts devotees from all over Kerala. The feast is renowned for the grand procession of St. George through the town, the fireworks display, and the beautiful church illumination.

However, an unfortunate firecracker accident at the Aruvithura Perunnal occurred in 2015, which took one life and injured several others. Following this tragedy, there were calls for stricter regulations on fireworks displays at religious festivals in Kerala.

The Pala diocese, under which Aruvithura falls, reportedly issued a ban on the use of crackers at festivals in its churches in October 2015, directly in response to the Aruvithura mishap.

In the years since, the fireworks display has been carefully controlled or sometimes discontinued to ensure the safety of all devotees attending the celebrations.

This church is approximately 7 km away from St. Alphonsa's Tomb, Bharananganam. Both churches are on the main road side and buses are easily available. Good parking facility is also available in both church campuses.

== Accessibility ==
- Nearest airport - Cochin International Airport - 86 km
- Nearest railway station - Kottayam - 39 km
- Nearest township - Erattupetta - 100 m
- Distance to Cochin/Ernakulam - 77 km
- Distance to Kottayam - 39 km
- Distance to Pala/Palai - 13 km
- Distance to Thiruvananthapuram- 161 km
