= Sri Krishnapuram Temple =

- ശ്രീ കൃഷ്ണപുരം ക്ഷേത്രം
- Sri Krishnapuram Temple, Thalappalam, Kottayam, Kerala

Religion
- Affiliation: Hinduism
- District: Kottayam
- Deity: Sri Krishna

Location
- Location: Thalappalam, Erattupetta
- State: Kerala
- Country: India
- Coordinates: 9°42′45.0″N 76°46′18.8″E

Architecture
- Type: Kerala style

Specifications
- Temple: One
- Elevation: 62.05 m (204 ft)

Sri Krishnapuram Temple is a Hindu temple dedicated to Lord Krishna situated in Kottayam, Kerala.

== Location ==
Thalappalam Sri Krishnapuram Temple is located in Thalappalam, near Erattupetta, Kottayam District, Kerala, India. Lord Sri Krishna is the main Prathishta in the temple.

== Legend ==
Thalappulam has been a seat of spirituality from time immemorial. Thala means "head" and pulam means "hamlet" or "place" . The meaning can be "the land of lands" or the place which is above other places. People of diverse cultures inhabited the land. They comprised Brahmanical, Sudra and Tribal origins. Consequent on internal feuds and fear of rivals gradually the Brahmins deserted the place searching for safer pastures. The tribals by nature led a nomadic way of life, never used to stick to a particular abode, drifted to other places. The remaining ‘Sudras’ were leading a serene, self-satisfied pastoral life devoting the time and resources for farming and agriculture. The people while following pastoral vocation in the fields, their iron tool struck up on something queer... Thereupon they stood stunning at the sight of the celestial spirit. Actually this might have caused to lay the foundation stone to the temple. The people of the hamlet were of both Vaishnava and Saiva sects.

== History ==
The deity of Lord Krishna was formally deified by the Tantric priest from The Thazhmon Madomon 22nd Midhunam of 1078. The legend regarding this tells an interesting story... It is believed that the people in general wanted to have a Siva temple. It was not in complete unison with their will that the temple of Sreekrishna was deified there. The Thazhmon Tantri had brought from his Mana the Vigraha of Lord Krishna and got established there as the presiding deity. The Vigraha was once worshipped by a Brahmin woman who later entrusted it with the Thazhmon Madham. The spiritual longing to have Lord Siva as a dominant deity had consummated into the establishment of a temple for Lord Siva consequent on and as a solution for famine, calamities and epidemics. The vigraha of Lord Siva was ceremoniously consecrated on 26th Edavam of 1124. The shortcomings due to absence of a Goddess was overcome with the establishment of a sreekovil for the Goddess. The Nair family namely, Kochupurakkal, had the administration and the ownership of the temple. Later a section of the family moved to temple neighborhood for administrative convenience. The Kochupurakkal families jointly resolved to hand over the administration and ownership of the temple and its land holdings to 196 N.S.S. Karayogam Thalappulam. The Karayuogam is now carrying forward the good work for the benefit of the worshippers of the whole Hindu community. Now a word about the deities and their uniqueness. The two deities are in duo mode, namely, Radha-Krishna/Parvathi-Parameswara... The devotees, therefore, come to worship the Gods in duo mode as husband and wife for having good progeny. The same vigraha which was brought from Thazhmon Madham will be ceremoniously re-consecrated in the new sreekovil by the Tantric priest from the same Brahmonical tharavadu, Thazhmon Madham after 111 years from its first introduction.
