= Pathampuzha =

- Village
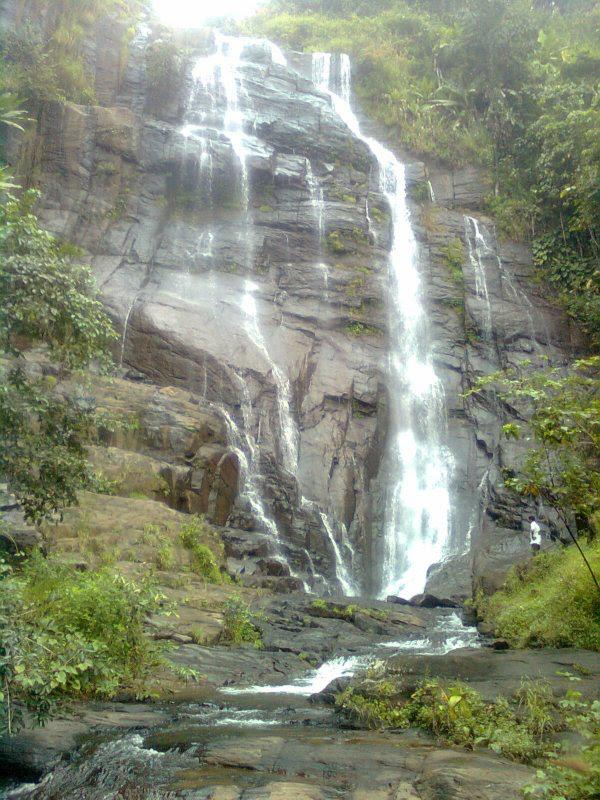
- A view from Aruvikkachal.
- Interactive map of Pathampuzha
- Coordinates: 9.6292798°N 76.83786°E
- Country: India
- State: Kerala
- District: Kottayam

Languages
  - Official: Malayalam, English
- Time zone: UTC+5:30 (IST)
- PIN: 686582 (Poonjar Thekkekara)
- Telephone code: 04822
- Vehicle registration: KL-35
- Nearest city: Kottayam
- Lok Sabha constituency: Pathanamthitta
- Climate: typical Kerala climate (Köppen)

Pathampuzha is a small village in the Kottayam district of Kerala state, India. Aruvikkachal waterfalls is one of the tourist attraction here.
