= Thalappalam =

- Village
- Thalappalam, Kottayam, Kerala, India
- Coordinates: 9°42′26″N 76°46′16″E
- Country: India
- State: Kerala
- District: Kottayam

Government
  - Type: panchayati raj
  - Body: Grama panchayat

Area
  - Total: 22.73 km^{2} (8.78 sq mi)
- Elevation: 51.66 m (169.5 ft)

Population (2011)
  - Total: 9,435
  - Density: 535/km^{2} (1,390/sq mi)

Languages
  - Official: Malayalam, English
- Time zone: UTC+5:30 (IST)
- PIN: 686579
- Telephone code: +914822******
- Vehicle registration: KL-35
- Nearest city: Pala
- Sex ratio: 951 ♂/♀
- Literacy: 95%
- Lok Sabha constituency: Kottayam
- Vidhan Sabha constituency: Pala

Thalappalam is a village in Kottayam district in the state of Kerala, India.

== Demographics ==
As of 2011 India census, Thalappalam had a population of 9435 with 4722 males and 4713 females.

== Religion ==
Thalappalam has a Hindu temple viz., Sri Krishnapuram Temple which is dedicated to Lord Krishna.
