= Parathanam =

- Village
- Interactive map of Parathanam
- Coordinates: 9°34′8″N 76°52′1″E
- Country: India
- State: Kerala
- District: Kottayam

Languages
  - Official: Malayalam, English
- Time zone: UTC+5:30 (IST)
- PIN: 686514
- Vehicle registration: KL-34
- Nearest City: Mundakayam / Kanjirappally / Erattupetta
- Lok Sabha Constituency: Pathanamthitta
- Kerala Legislature Constituency: Poonjar

Parathanam is a town at the base of Western Ghats mountain ranges in the Kottayam district, Kerala. It is 2,000 feet (610 m) above sea level and is situated on the eastern border of Kottayam District, 60 km from Kottayam, 12 km away from Poonjar and around 8 km away from Mundakayam on the NH 220 (Kottayam–Kumily Road). FHC Parathanam is the oldest Government Medical Centre here.

== Location ==
This village is situated 8 km away from Mundakayam and 18 km away from Erattupetta close by. Sea View Estate UP School is one of the oldest upper primary schools in the Kottayam district.

== Economy ==
Rubber is a prime crop in Parathanam, one of the first places in India where it was cultivated.

== Transportation ==
The nearest airport is Cochin International Airport. The nearest railway station is Kottayam
