= Meenachil River =

River in Kerala, India

Meenachil River (Gauna, Kavanar, Valanjar, Indiar)
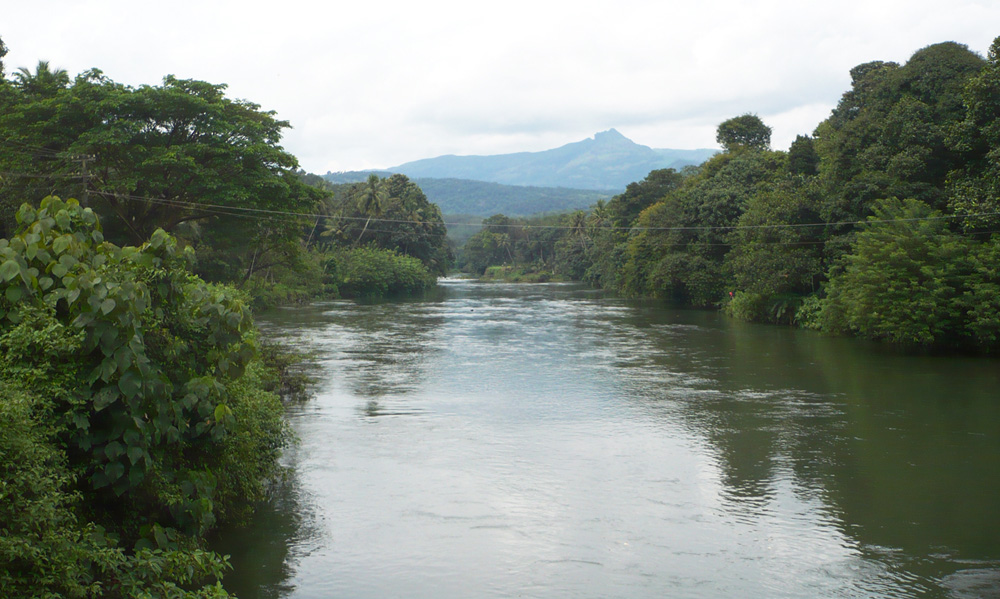
- Meenachil River, view from Erattupetta

Location
- Country: India

Physical characteristics
- Source
  - location: Western Ghats
  - elevation: 1,156 m (3,793 ft)
- Mouth
  - location: Vembanad Lake
- Length: 78 km (48 mi)

The Meenachil River or Meenachilaar (Malayalam: മീനച്ചിലാർ), also known as Kavanar, Valanjar, is a river in Kerala. It is one of the most treacherous rivers in Kerala due to its flash floods, heavy undercurrents and woods and debris it carries from the mountains. It flows through the heart of Kottayam district, Kerala state in southern India. 78 km long, originates in the Western Ghats main tributaries are Theekoy aaru from Vagamon hills, Poonjar Aaru and Chittar, flowing westward through the city of Kottayam and other towns like Poonjar, Teekoy, Erattupetta, Bharananganam, Pala, Mutholy, Cherpunkal, Kidangoor and Kumarakom before emptying into the Vembanad Lake on the shore of the Indian Ocean.

General elevation ranges from 77 m to 1156 m in the highlands and less than 2 m in the lowlands and 8 to 68 m in the midlands. The Meenachil has a watershed area of 1208.11 km^{2}. The river has a total annual yield of 2,349 million cubic metre and an annual utilizable yield of 1110 million cubic metre. The river has 38 tributaries including major and minor ones.

The name Meenachil is derived from the name of Goddess Meenakshi of Madurai. The river finds mention in Arundhati Roy's Booker Prize-winning novel, The God of Small Things.

== Environmental issues ==
There are a few serious issues currently affecting the environment of the Meenachil river basin. Some of them are:

1. Water pollution due to disposal of urban and domestic waste into the river all through the banks of the river especially at urban centers like Erattupetta, Palai, Ettumanoor and Kottayam.
2. Uncontrolled legal and illegal mining of river sand leading to depletion of water table.
3. Illegal construction of numerous check dams.
4. Diversion of upstream water to Idukki dam from the Vazhikkadavu Mini Dam.
5. Illegal fishing, destroying marine life.
6. Excavation of clay and sand from paddy fields for the brick and construction industries.

== Popular culture ==
The river is also mentioned in the Booker Prize winning book "The God of Small Things" by Arundhati Roy. The story is centred on the Aymanam village through which the Meenachil river flows. The Meenachil River is also mentioned in many stories. One famous story from Kottarathil Saankunni’s Aithihyamala connected to the Meenachil River involves a gentle and intelligent temple elephant called Kidangoor Kandankoran.

== Religious importance ==
The annual Aaraattu, (Holy Bath) of deity Lord Shiva at Ettumanoor Mahadevar Temple is performed at banks surfaced at Peroor, Neericadu and Thiruvanchoor villages of Meenachil River. The annual Aaraattu rituals of many other deities are also performed on banks of Meenachil River.Kumaranalloor temple too has historical connection to the river. Rakuli (Denha) perunnal is a major celebration on the banks of Meenachil river at St. Thomas Cathedral, Pala. The ancient church at Bharananganam has a history of fight which originated on a conflict as on which bank of the river should the church be rebuilt after the old one existed on the southern bank was burnt down.

== Economics and culture ==
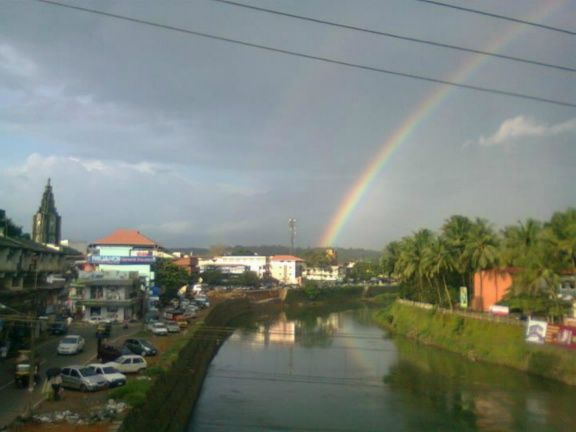
Pala town on the banks of the Meenachil

Meenachil river is the major river in Kottayam district and lakhs of people and many major towns and cities like Erattupetta, Palai, Ettumannur and Kottayam depend on this river for drinking water and water for commercial activities. In earlier days when road transport was not developed much, kettuvalloms used to transport goods through Meenachil up to 2 km above Erattupetta and take agricultural products like copra, spices and wood to Alleppey port. Thousands of farmers use water from the river for agriculture. It is the natural channel for the discharge of rain water into the sea from eastern hills of Kottayam district. In its banks have come up major cities and commercial centres which also are cradles of the culture of this area of Travancore. Meenachil river water enters the Vembanad lake before reaching the sea and has a major share in shaping the water bodies in and around Kottayam towards western coast and the backwaters. During monsoon the river can be full or flooding the nearby low-lying areas on many occasions. People who live near the river and its tributaries indeed are deeply concerned about the decline of the river's water retention capacity due to loss of tree cover, top soil loss and excessive legal and illegal sand mining and also the serious water pollution issues due to garbage disposal to the river all along the banks of the river. There is now acute shortage of water in summer. The mighty rain-fed river turns almost completely dry in summer. Unless some serious, immediate effort is taken, Meenachil River will soon become highly polluted affecting lots of people who depend on the river.

== Threat to the river ==
Meenachil River face threat of Widespread illegal sand mining from sand mafia. Initially the banks of Meenachil River were very enriched with sands. Now the banks of Meenachil River are filled with mud and grasses. The depth of the river is increasing day by day due to illegal sand mining. Sewage pollution also causes contaminating water of Meenachil River especially in Summer seasons. Plastic, garbage and other material waste is another threat and use of heavy fertilizers on its plain and use of soap and heavy detergents also deteriorate its quality and beauty.

== Floods ==
The Meenachil River is no exception to annual floods during monsoon seasons and causing destruction to public life like any other big rivers. Meenachil River is very dangerous and wild during flood seasons due to the depth of the river. The river always had huge flood in monsoon and can change from a stream to massive size just in minutes of rain.Big floods started reported about Meenachil River in 2018 and later became a major flood joining waters from other rivers in Kerala due to floods, rains, finally it also contributed to 2018 Kerala floods and major casualty in human history.

Conservation and Protection

There are several community initiatives which are protecting and maintaining Meenachil River. The Meenachil Rain and River Monitoring Group (MRRM), and its parent organisation The Meenachil River Protection Council (MRCP), MRRM’s are one of them. Eby Emmanuel, Manoj Palakkaran, Ravi Pala , Binu Perumana are some of the people who are involved in the protection. They also share water levels and other informations to people in different parts of the Meenachil River using social media.

== See also ==
- Pala
- Meenakshi
- Kottayam
