= Cherupushpa Mission League =

Mission ventures in the Catholic Church

Cherupushpa Mission League (CML) is one of the mission ventures of the Syro Malabar Church. It was started on October 3, 1947, as a lay initiative to promote the missionary zeal among the members of the Church, especially children and youngsters. The missionaries from other foreign countries left India after it got independence in 1947. CML was thus started for promoting indigenous vocations to priesthood and consecrated life in the Catholic Church. Two visionaries P. C. Abram Pallattukunnel who is popularly known as Kunjettan (Little Brother) and Fr Joseph Maliparampil formed this pious organisation.

== History ==
Cherupushpa Mission League is a lay apostolic organisation started in 1947 which promotes the missionary cause of the Catholic Church. The pioneers of this organisation were Rev. Fr Joseph Maliparampil (24 December 1909 – 9 September 1998), the then assistant parish priest of St Mary's Church, Bharanganam and P. C. Abraham Pallattukunnel ( 1925 – 11 August 2009). The then Metropolitan of Changanessery Bishop James Kalacherry gave the official recognition to it. The official inauguration of the organisation was on 3 October 1947 on the occasion of the centenary of the death anniversary of Little Flower of Lisieux. The inauguration was done by Bishop Thomas Tharayil, the then Bishop of Kottayam diocese.

== Patron saints ==
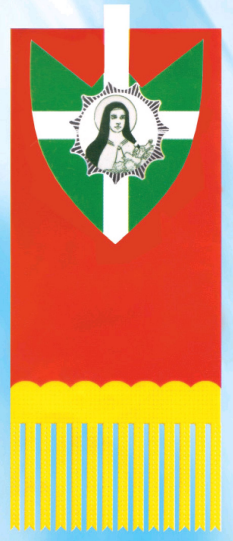
CML Badge

Little Flower of Lisieux is the chief patron saint of CML. Other patrons are Thomas the Apostle, Francis Xavier and Alphonsamma.

== Motto and slogan ==
"Your own sons, Oh India, will be the heralds of your salvation" (Filii tui India, administri tibi salutis), the words of Pope Leo XIII, is taken as the motto of CML. He was well aware of promoting ingenious vocations to priesthood. He said, "Consequently, if we want to be concerned for the salvation of India and the establishment of Christianity in that immense region on a firm foundation, we will have to select candidates from the native people, who after careful training will assume priestly functions and duties."

The official slogan is "Love, Sacrifice, Service, Suffering" and is inscribed in the emblem of CML

== Emblem ==
The official emblem consist a world map, Bible and lamp, Then the official slogan below that.

The map of India - Mission league began in India, it was also the first missionary movement that began in India after WW2.

The open Bible - represents the message of God you will be spreading.

== Founders ==
Rev. Fr Joseph Maliparampil, P. C. Abraham Pallattukunnel were the ones who led for the creation of the league.They were also helped by T. T. Mathew Thekkumkattil, M. K. Joseph Maramattam, P. J Thomas Palaplackal, T. T. Mathew Thakidiyel and T. S. Mathew Kizhakkekkara are the pioneering members of the group.

== Aim ==
The organisation mainly aims at promoting the missionary works of the Catholic Church. In 1968 CML started a Vocation Bureau which of its first kind in India. Later it is developed into Kerala Vocation Service Centre (KVSC), Bharanganam.

== Official recognition ==
The Kerala Catholic Bishops' Council recognised Cherupushpa Mission League on 6 April 1977. Later in 1981 the Catholic Bishops' Conference of India officially recognised the organisation. In November 1990 KCBC included CML in the Commission for Church's Extension and Vocation. In 2016 CML comes under the direct administration of the Syro Malabar Bishops Council with Major Archbishop as its patron and the Chairman of the Vocation Commission as its co-patron.
