= Kezhuvamkulam =

- village
- Location in Kerala, India Kezhuvamkulam (India)
- Coordinates: 9°40′0″N 76°38′0″E
- Country: India
- State: Kerala
- District: Kottayam

Languages
  - Official: Malayalam, English
- Time zone: UTC+5:30 (IST)
- PIN: 686584
- Vehicle registration: KL-
- Coastline: 0 kilometres (0 mi)
- Climate: Tropical monsoon (Köppen)
- Avg. summer temperature: 35 °C (95 °F)
- Avg. winter temperature: 20 °C (68 °F)

Kezhuvamkulam is a village in the Kottayam District in the Indian state of Kerala.

Schools

1. Government L P School, Kezhuvamkulam
2. NSS High School, Kezhuvamkulam
