= Poonjar =

- Town
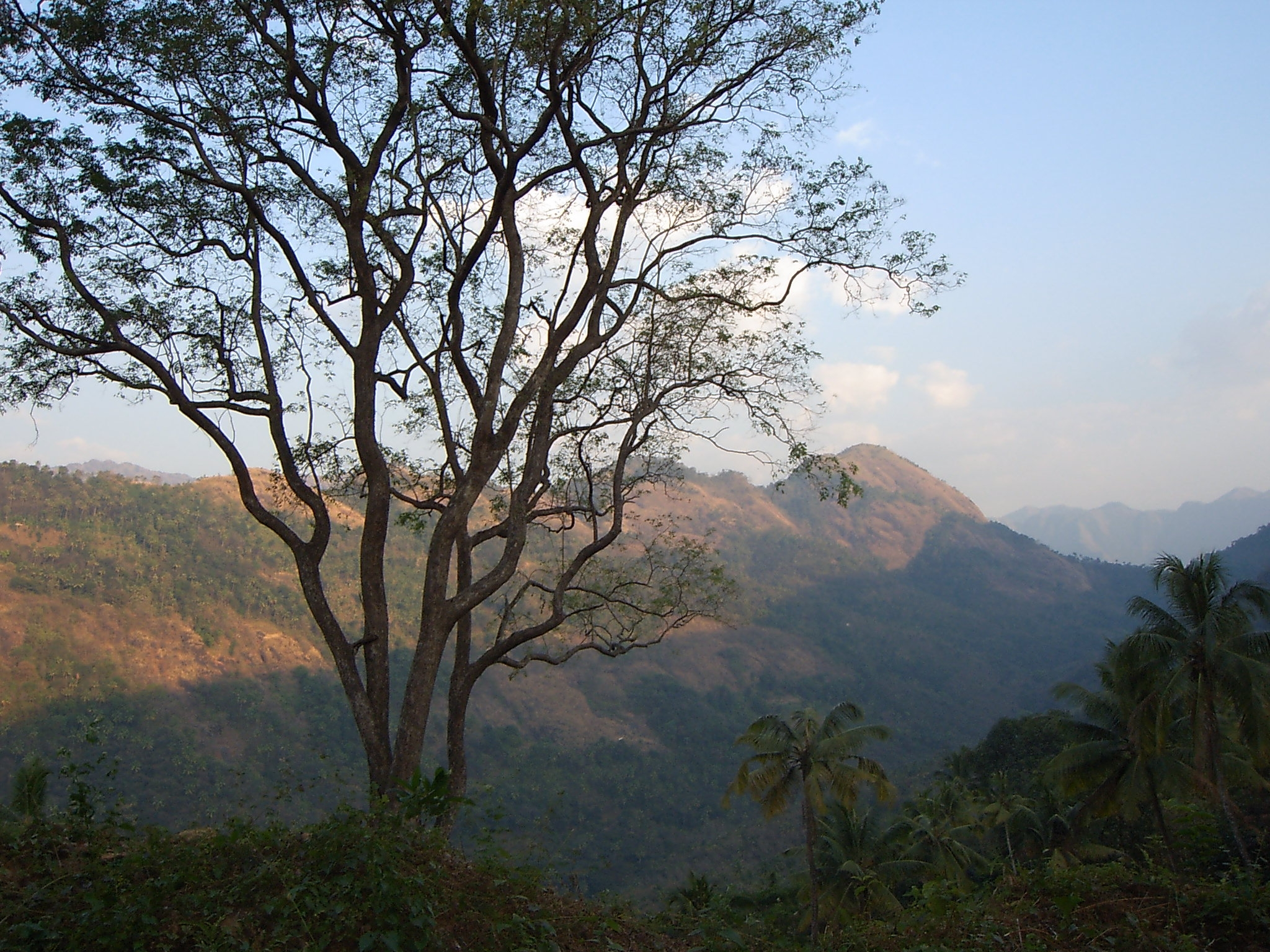
- A view from Kaippally, the hilly region of Poonjar

- Location in Kerala, India Poonjar (India)
- Coordinates: 9.674369°N 76.808669°E
- Country: India
- State: Kerala
- District: Kottayam

Languages
  - Official: Malayalam, English
- Time zone: UTC+5:30 (IST)
- PIN: 686581 (Poonjar), 686582 (Poonjar Thekkekara)
- Telephone code: 04822
- ISO 3166 code: IN-KL
- Vehicle registration: KL-35
- Nearest city: Kottayam
- Lok Sabha constituency: Pathanamthitta
- Climate: typical Kerala climate (Köppen)

Poonjar is a small Indian town located on the eastern side of Kottayam district in Kerala state, India. Before the independence of India, Poonjar had been the part of Travancore princely state. The nearest towns to Poonjar include Erattupetta, Teekoy, Bharananganam, and Vagamon. The taluk headquarters at Pala is 18 km away, Kanjirappally is 22.6 km away, and Thodupuzha is 34 km away.

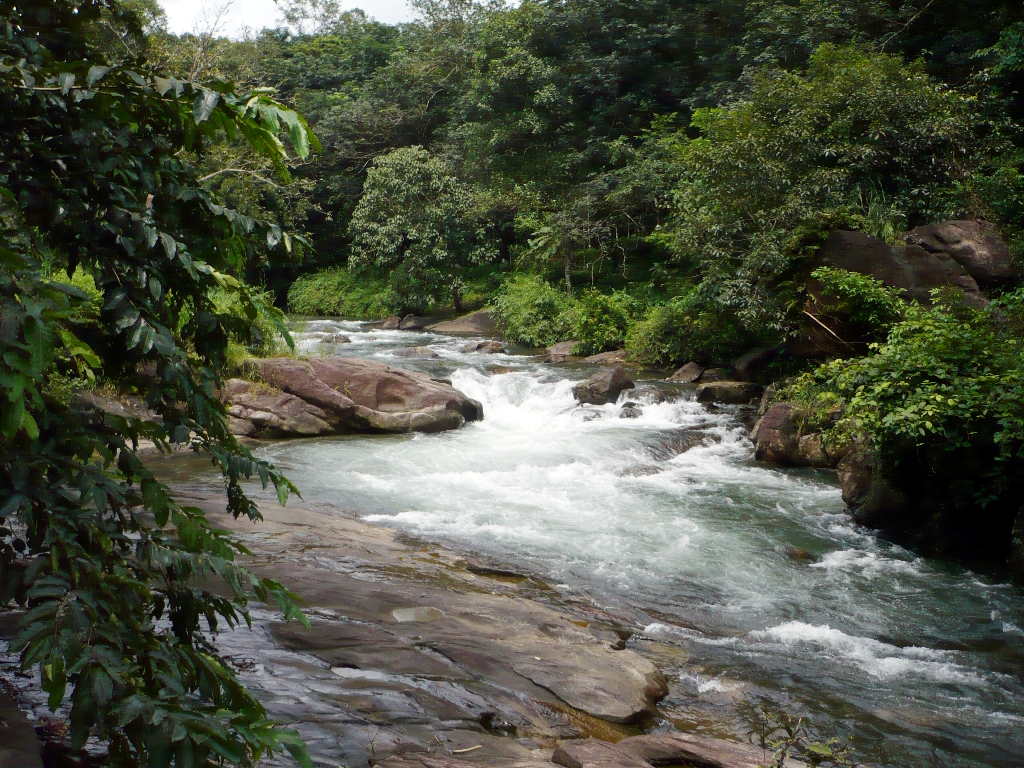
Meenchil river at Poonjar

== History ==
Poonjar is a historically significant town located in the north-eastern part of Kottayam district, at the foothills of the Western Ghats. It served as the capital of the Poonjar dynasty, which ruled over the region for several centuries. The Poonjar royal family played an important role in the history of the central Travancore region.

== Poonjar dynasty ==
The Poonjar dynasty traces its origins to the Pandyan kings of the Sangam period. Its founder, Manavikrama Kulashekhara Perumal, was a Pandyan prince whose mother was a Chera princess. In 1152 CE, he moved from Madurai to the region due to political instability in Tamil country. He brought one of the three idols of the goddess Meenakshi (the dynasty's tutelary deity) from the Madurai Meenakshi Temple. This idol was installed on the banks of the Meenachil River, where the Meenakshi Temple in Poonjar stands today.

=== Manavikram Raja ===
Manavikrama Raja acquired land from the Thekkumkoor Rajas, which encompassed parts of present-day Kottayam, Pathanamthitta, and Idukki districts, and incorporated it into his domain. He strengthened political ties in the region by marrying his daughter to the Edapally Raja. During the 17th and 18th centuries, at the height of its power, the Poonjar dynasty exercised suzerainty over large parts of present-day Idukki and Kottayam districts, as well as portions of Ernakulam and Pathanamthitta districts in Kerala, and parts of Ramnad and Madurai districts in Tamil Nadu.

=== Palani Hills ===
The Palani hills were also part of the Poonjar kingdom. In July 1877, among other leases, Kerala Varma Raja, then chief of the royal house leased 128,000 acres (520 km^{2}) for 99 years, to a British planter named Thomas Munro. This is the famous Kannan Devan Hill Produce Company (KDHP) lease. The area under the current Mullaperiyar Dam was part of their jurisdiction. Their neighbour to the south, Travancore, whose territorial boundary was Kottarakara, did not dispute the actual control until 1889. Travancore finally established their suzerainty by royal proclamation on 24 September 1899, backed by the British.

=== Finlays company ===
The Kannan Devan Hills lease (not ownership) was transferred to Finlays in the 1930s, and later taken over by Tata Tea (now Kanan Devan Hills Plantations) in the 1950s. The lease has since expired, and ownership of the land remains disputed. The main revenue for the Poonjar Kingdom was hill and forest produce, and Erattupetta was the commercial center.

=== Ancient palace ===
The ancient palace and temples dedicated to Sree Dharma Shastha and Meenakshi are located on the banks of the Meenachil River. Raghubir Singh, the famed National Geographic photographer, has published photographs of this temple, nestled in the foothills of the high ranges of Kerala, in National Geographic.

=== Notable members of the royal family ===
The Poonjar royal family has produced several prominent figures in the 20th century.

Colonel Goda Varma Raja (G. V. Raja, 1908–1971), a member of the family, married Karthika Thirunal Lakshmi Bayi, senior Rani of Travancore. He is widely recognised as the "Father of Tourism in Kerala" for promoting sports and tourism development in the state.

His elder brother, P. R. Rama Varma Raja (1904–2001), commonly known as the Alakode Raja or Alakkode Thampuran, relocated to northern Kerala following differences with Dewan C. P. Ramaswami Aiyar. He purchased extensive land in Alakode (Taliparamba taluk, Kannur district), where he developed agricultural estates. A statue in his honour stands in Alakode. His life and contributions to regional development are documented in the biography Alakkode Thampuran by K. P. Kesavan Master (Mathrubhumi Books, ISBN 9789359622415).

== Education ==
The S.M.V. High School, dedicated to the memory of the then Maharaja Sri Moolam Tirunal of Travancore dynasty, was founded in 1913 and was the only school in the region for decades and luminaries of all political, bureaucratic, academic, literary and religious hues who have played formative roles in modern Kerala have passed through its gates. Some of the notable names among its alumni are Col. GV Raja, Sri PR Rama Varma Raja (Alacode Raja), Sri PK Vasudevan Nair (former Chief Minister of Kerala), Sri TA Thomman (former Minister of Kerala), Sri CP Ramakrishna Pillai IAS (former Secretary, Govt of Kerala), Sri R Ramachandran Nair IAS (former Chief Secretary, Govt of Kerala), Sri KJ Mathew IAS (former Chief Secretary, Govt of Kerala, etc. The school, as well as five temples, are currently managed by a family trust of the Palace. Colonel Goda Varma Raja (G.V. Raja), the consort of the Maharani of erstwhile Travancore, Karthika Thirunal Lakshmi Bayi, and brother-in-law of Maharaja Sri Chitra Tirunal, was a member of this family. His elder brother was P. R. Rama Varma Raja, who, after a difference of opinion with C. P. Ramaswami Iyer, left Travancore in the late 1930s, and purchased 36,000 acres (150 km^{2}) of land in Alakode, Taliparamba taluk of Kannur district. He was often referred to as the Alakode Raja.

== A.T.M.Library(Avittam Thirunal Memorial Library) ==
Another notable institution in Poonjar is the ATM Library, named after Avittom Thirunal, the deceased crown prince of Travancore and eldest son of Col. G. V. Raja. Established in 2003, it is an "A" class library that has played a significant role in the educational and cultural development of the area.

== Churches ==
Poonjar is home to several historic churches, including the St. Mary's Church, Poonjar (built in 1300 CE), St. Mary's Church at Adivaram, and St. Joseph's Church at Maniamkunnu. The town now has numerous churches reflecting its significant Christian population.

== Transportation ==
Poonjar is well connected to the other parts of the state by frequent state transport and private bus services. Poonjar is very near to the well-known tourist spots like Poonjar Palace, Vagamon, Kolahalamedu, Ilaveezha Poonchira etc. The popular Christian pilgrim centre Bharananganam and Aruvithura is also very near to Poonjar. The nearest railway station is Ettumanoor (35 km) and airport is Cochin (80 km). Nearest places are Parathanam 16 km, Kunnonni, Peringulam, Adivaram, Pathampuzha, Panachikappara, Erattupetta

== Geography ==
Geographically, Poonjar is divided into three villages: Poonjar Thekkekara, Poonjar Vadakkekara, and Poonjar Nadubhagam. Two major tributaries of the Meenachil River originate in the Poonjar hills and merge at Erattupetta. The hilly terrain features numerous waterfalls and streams. Notable waterfalls include Kottathavalam. Nearby villages include Kunnonny, Adivaram, Pathambuzha, and Kaippally. The Muthukora Hills (also known locally as the "Meeshappulimala of Kottayam") rise to about 2,400 feet (730 m) above sea level.

== Education ==
Sree Moola vilasam (SMV) Higher Secondary School and St. Antony's Higher Secondary School are the main higher secondary schools in Poonjar.

In the year 2000, an Engineering College managed by the Institute of Human Resource Development (IHRD) was constructed near the Poonjar bus stand. The college was given the name College of Engineering, Poonjar. In the year 2003, a separate building was constructed for the college at Payyanithotam (4 km from Poonjar) in order to avoid the disturbances caused during peak hours at the bus stand.

The College of Engineering, Poonjar was established in 2000 by the Institute of Human Resources Development (IHRD), a Government of Kerala undertaking. IHRD is a pioneer educational organisation in the fields of electronics, engineering, and computer science. The college is affiliated to the APJ Abdul Kalam Technological University (KTU).

== Politics ==
Poonjar is one of the 140 legislative assembly constituencies of Kerala state. Poonjar's assembly constituency is part of Pathanamthitta (Lok Sabha constituency). Previously it was part of Muvattupuzha (Lok Sabha constituency). The major political parties of Poonjar are Kerala Congress (M), Indian National Congress, CPI (M) and CPI.

Eminent political leaders of the past include A. J. John, Anaparambil (former Chief Minister of Travancore-Cochin) and K. M. George (former Minister and the founder of Kerala Congress).

The present political leaders of Kerala who are from Poonjar are N. M. Joseph (former minister and State President of Janathadal (S)) and P. C. George.

== Prominent Leaders based on Parties ==
Indian National Congress

1. Adv. Jomon Aykkara

2. MC Varkey Muthirenthikal

3. Varkey Vayampothinal

4. George Azhattu

5. Johnson Cheruvally

6. Adv. Satheesh Kumar

7. Olvin K Thomas

8. Adv. Muhammed Ilyas

9. Rogi Muthirenthikal

Communist Party of India (Marxist)

1. Rama Mohan

2. Joy George

3. Ramesh B Vettimattom

4. Mohanan Nair

5. Jerry Vargheese

6. Adv. Akshay Hari

7. T S Siju

8. Gokul MG Marutholil

9. Asha Riju

10. V K Mohanan

11. Midhun Babu

12. Sajeev Hamid

Bharathiya Janatha Party

1. P C George

2. Shone George

3. Clint Areeplackal
