= Erattupetta =

- Municipality
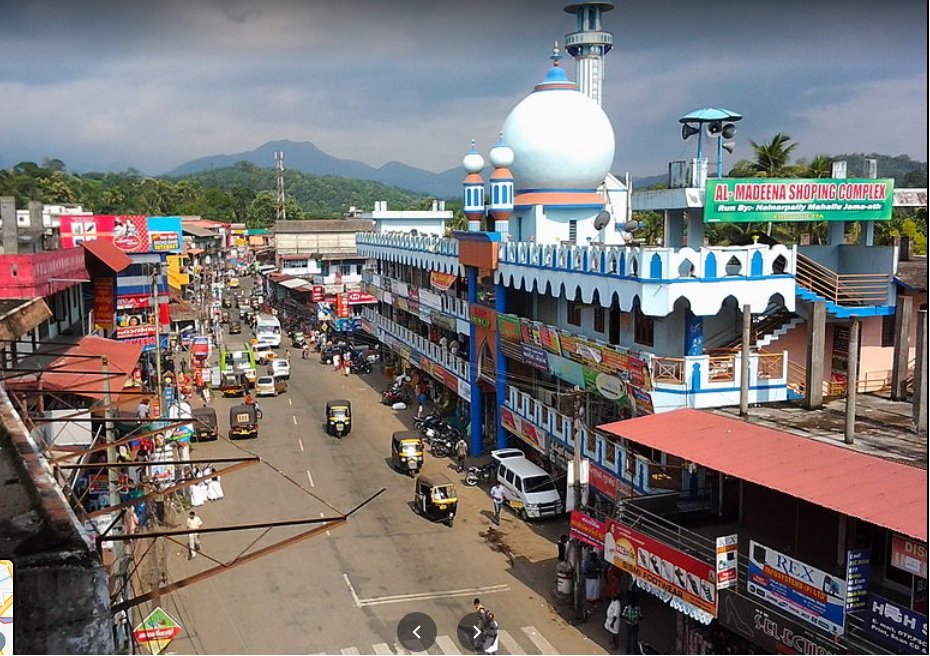
- Central junction, Erattupetta

- Location in Kerala, India Erattupetta (India)
- Coordinates: 9.7°N 76.78°E
- Country: India
- State: Kerala
- District: Kottayam

Government
  - Type: Municipality
  - Municipal Chairman: Adv. V P Nazar(IUML)
  - Municipal Vice Chairperson: Fathima Ansar (INC)

Area
  - Total: 18.29 km^{2} (7.06 sq mi)
- Elevation: 24 m (79 ft)

Population (2011)
  - Total: 34,814
  - Density: 1,903/km^{2} (4,930/sq mi)

Languages
  - Official: Malayalam, English
- Time zone: UTC+5:30 (IST)
- Postal code: 686122
- Postal code: 686121
- Vehicle registration: KL-35
- Literacy: 95%
- Website: Official website

Erattupetta (Malayalam pronunciation: [i:ra:tupe:ʈa]) is a municipality in the Kottayam district of Kerala, India. It is located 40 km (24.9 mi) east of the district headquarters in Kottayam and about 157 km (97.6 mi) north of the state capital Thiruvananthapuram. As per the 2011 Indian census, Erattupetta has a population of 34,814 people, and a population density of 1,906/km^{2} (4,940/sq mi).

== Etymology ==
The "Eraaru" part in all the variations of the names arose from the geographical location where the two rivers (aaru) merge as a single one. Erattupetta is situated in the foothills of the High Ranges. 'Peta' means town in Dravidian languages. Earlier, it was known as 'Erapoli' or 'Erapuzha'. It was the commercial capital of the Poonjar principality until 1949.

== People ==
Tamil Immigrants: The most important of these were the (Rawther) Khan family Muslims who came from Madurai in Tamil Nadu in the twelfth century, along with the Poonjar royal family and their loyal servants and bodyguards. This group also includes Hindus belonging to the Chetti tribe and the Rowthers who left Tamil areas in the 14th century. They still speak Malayalam mixed with Tamil. Additionally, there are families who are converted to Christianity.

Malayali Immigrants: This group includes Christians who migrated from Kodungallur with the advent of Christianity, and from Nilakkal in the fourteenth century, Muslims who came from Edappally near Kochi after the advent of Islam, the Mehtar sect, and later Muslims from various families who came from Malappuram and Ernakulam districts. Apart from this, there is another sect with roots in Saudi Arabia, known as the Labbay, descendants of Shaikh Saeed Bawa. While the Muslims, who depended on trade, settled in Eratupetta itself, the Christians moved to the nearby hills in search of fertile farmlands. Other laborers moved to different areas depending on the availability of work. This is the reason why Eratupetta became a Muslim-majority area.

== Economy ==
In the past, the Muthuvan people brought hill produce from the Cardamom Hills down for trade. Today, Erattupetta serves as a trading center for spices, rubber, areca nut, and other agricultural products. The hill station of Wagamon lies approximately 22 km east of Erattupetta. The town also has a significant expatriate population living in Gulf countries, particularly in the United Arab Emirates and Saudi Arabia.

== Demographics ==
According to the Population Census 2011, there are a total of 7,686 families residing in Erattupetta. The total population of Erattupetta is 34,814, of which 17,555 are males and 17,259 are females, resulting in an average sex ratio of 983 females per 1,000 males.

The population of children aged 0-6 years in Erattupetta is 4,474, which is 13% of the total population. There are 2,294 male children and 2,180 female children in this age group. As per the Census 2011, the child sex ratio of Erattupetta is 950, which is lower than the average sex ratio of 983.

According to the Census 2011, the literacy rate of Erattupetta is 95.5%, which is lower than the 97.2% literacy rate of Kottayam district. The male literacy rate in Erattupetta is 97.39%, while the female literacy rate is 93.51%.

== Geography ==
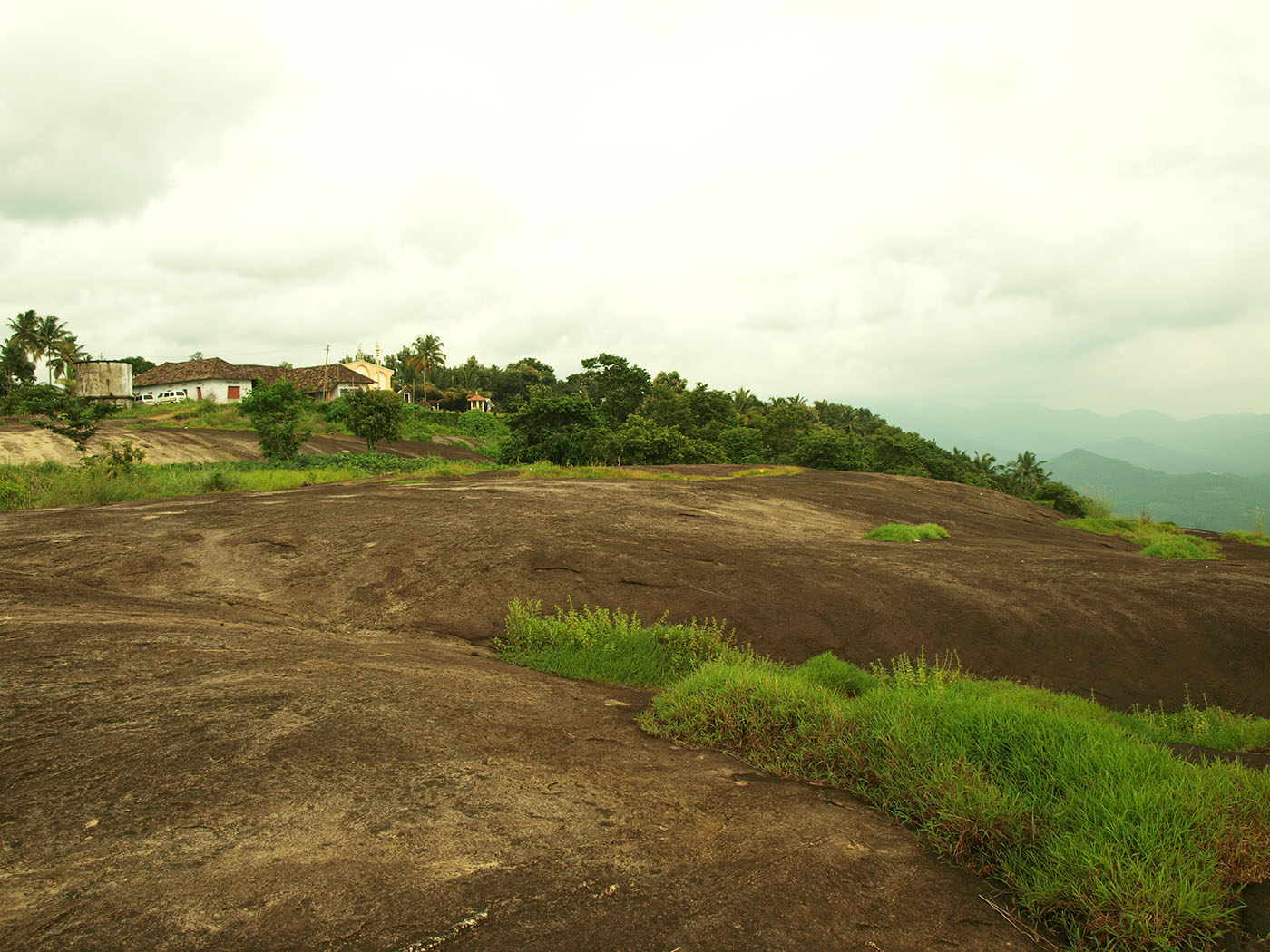
Ayyampara Rock

Erattupetta can be easily accessed from north Kerala via the Angamaly-Muvattupuzha-Thodupuzha-Muttom route. It is also well connected to Tamil Nadu via the Kottayam-Kumali Road(KK Road) to Madurai, through the nearest town, Mundakkayam, via Parathanam, which is 27 kilometers from Erattupetta. The town has an average elevation of 36 meters (118 feet).

== Politics ==
Erattupetta is a municipality. The current municipal chairperson is Adv V P Nazar (IUML).Vice chairperson Fathima ansar pullolil (INC). Erattupetta falls under the Pathanamthitta Lok Sabha constituency and the Poonjar assembly constituency. It is represented in the Lok Sabha by Anto Antony (UDF) and in the Kerala Legislative Assembly by Sebastian MJ (UDF- INC).

== Municipality Members ==
Election Results by Ward
Ward No.	Ward Name	Councilor Name	Party / Alliance
001	Idathumkunnu	Beema Sajir	CPI(M) /Left Democratic Front (Kerala)
002	Kalluthazham	Rasna Haseer	Other / Independent
003	Vattakayam	K. E. Rashid	CPI(M) /Left Democratic Front (Kerala)
004	Nadooparambu	Beema Nassar	Other / Independent
005	Murikkolil	Shahul Murikkolil	SDPI / Independent
006	Mathakkal	Raina Teacher	WPI / Independent
007	Kattamala	Shajidha V. A. Veliyathu	Other / Independent
008	Ealakkayam	Sunil Kumar K.	Other / Independent
009	Karackadu	Abdul Basith	IUML /United Democratic Front (Kerala)
010	Thevarupara	Afsal Velluparambil	IUML /United Democratic Front (Kerala)
011	Kuttimaramparambu	Sajimi Shihas	SDPI / Independent
012	Pathazhappadi	Zubair Vellappallil	SDPI / Independent
013	Nadackal	Surumi Yusuf Hiba	WPI / Independent
014	Mulanthanam	Ameen Pitayil	IUML /United Democratic Front (Kerala)
015	Kollamparambu	Absaar Murikkolil	IUML /United Democratic Front (Kerala)
016	Safa Nagar	Thaslin Siraj	IUML /United Democratic Front (Kerala)
017	Kuzhiveli	Adv V. P. Nasar	IUML /United Democratic Front (Kerala)
018	Sasthamkunnu	Ilmunnisa Muhammad Shafi	Other / Independent
019	Mattackadu	Sawad Injakkadan	CPI(M) /Left Democratic Front (Kerala)
020	Vanchankal	Nasira Teacher Vanchankal	Other / Independent
021	Town Ward	Anwar Aliyar	IUML /United Democratic Front (Kerala)
022	Thadavanal	Jasna Teacher (Jasna Shahir)	CPI(M) /Left Democratic Front (Kerala)
023	Mutharamkunnu	Afsal Ijaz	Other / Independent
024	Aanippadi	Fathima Ansar	Other / Independent
025	Chirappara	Nesni Haseeb	CPI(M) /Left Democratic Front (Kerala)
026	Kallolil	Soumy Rasi	CPI(M) /Left Democratic Front (Kerala)
027	Kondoormala	Sinto Vincent Pullolil	Other / Independent
028	Block Office Ward	Shiyas Muhammad C.C. M.	INC /United Democratic Front (Kerala)
029	Aruvithura	Jameel Kunnel	KC(M) /Left Democratic Front (Kerala)
