= Kidangoor =

Kidangoor may refer to:

- Kidangoor, Kottayam, a town in Kerala, India
- Kidangoor, Ernakulam, a town in Kerala, India
