= Kidangoor, Ernakulam =

Kidangoor
- village
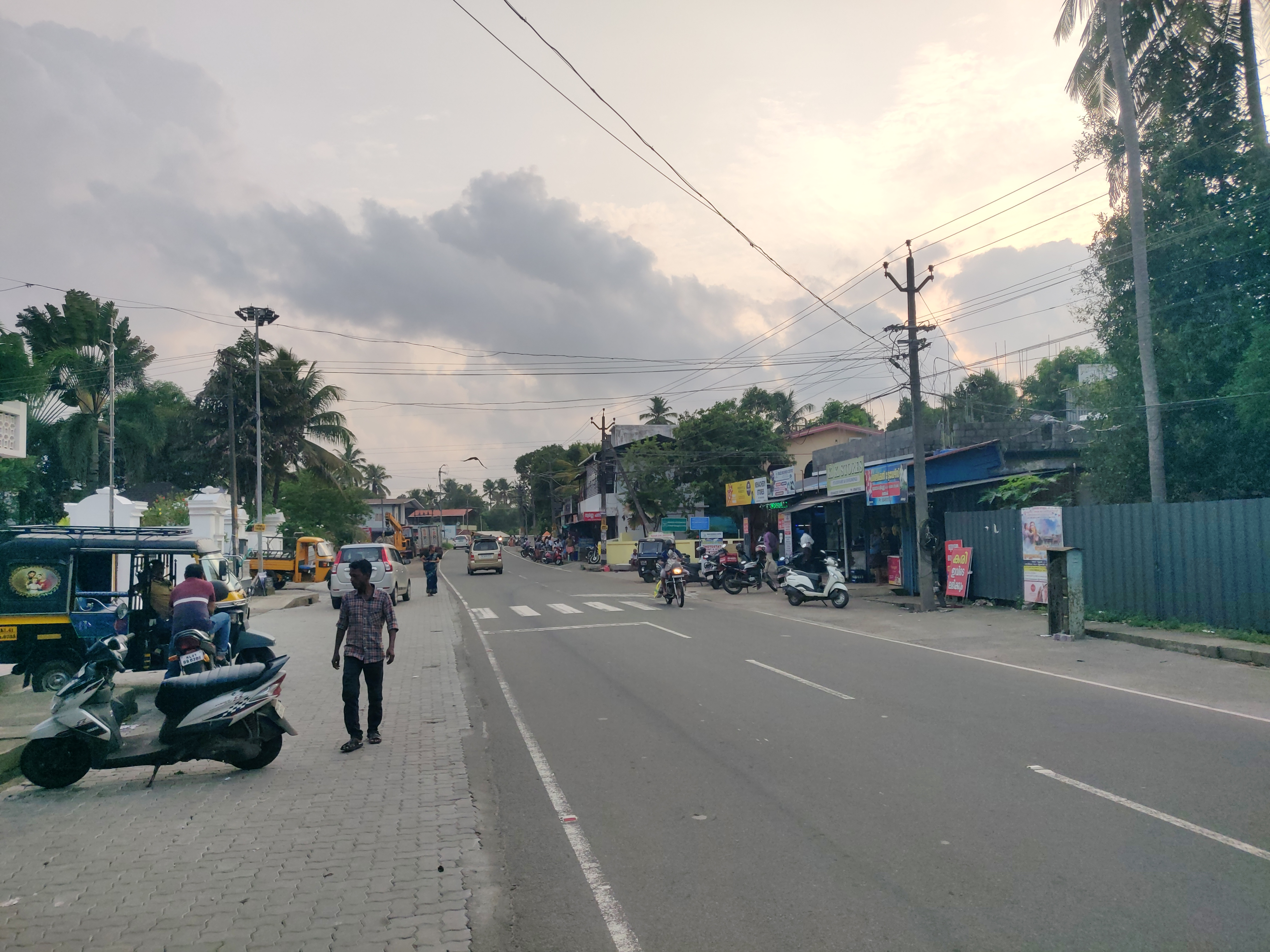
- Kidangoor Junction in 2024
- Interactive map of Kidangoor
- Coordinates: 10°12′04″N 76°24′14″E
- Country: India
- State: Kerala
- District: Ernakulam
- Assembly constituency: Angamaly

Government
  - Type: LSGD
  - Body: Thuravoor Grama Panchayath

Languages
  - Official: Malayalam, English
- Time zone: UTC+5:30 (IST)
- PIN: 683572
- Telephone code: 0484
- Vehicle registration: KL-63
- Coastline: 0 kilometres (0 mi)
- Nearest city: Angamaly
- Lok Sabha constituency: Chalakudy
- Climate: Tropical monsoon (Köppen)
- Avg. summer temperature: 35 °C (95 °F)
- Avg. winter temperature: 20 °C (68 °F)

Kidangoor is a small village in Thuravoor Panchayath near Angamaly in Eranakulam district in the Indian state of Kerala.

Kidangoor consists of vast agricultural area near Angamaly town, in Thuravoor Panchayath. It is divided into South Kidangoor and North Kidangoor. Angamaly to Manjapra - Malayaattoor road is the main road passed through this area. This area is under Thuravoor Grama panchayath, Angamaly Village, Aluva taluk, Ernakulam District. Mullassery canal is a main water stream going through the village. Kidangoor is the birthplace of V T Bhattathirippad.

== Schools ==
- Sree Bhadra LP School
- Infant Jesus LP School
- St. Joseph's Higher Secondary School
- Alphons Sadhan Special School
- Auxilium School Kidangoor

== Notable personalities ==
- V. T. Bhattathiripad - Indian social critic, well-known dramatist and a prominent freedom fighter. Lived in kidangoor -Birthplace of his mother
- Cardinal Joseph Parecattil - He served as Archbishop of Ernakulam from 1956 to 1984, and was elevated to the cardinalate in 1969.
- Chemban Vinod Jose - Famous Malayalam movie artist.

== Temples ==
- Kulappurakavu Bhagavathi Temple, a renowned temple in the area.
- Kidangoor Sree Mahavishnu Temple
- Kavalakkattu Mahadeva Temple
- Vilangappurath Sree Bhadrakali Temple
- Sree Subramanya Swami Temple
- Kovattu Bhagavathi Temple
- Sree malikappuram Temple
- Vettakorumakan Temple

== Church ==
- Infant Jesus Church Kidangoor.
- St: Jude Shrine Yoodhapuram.
- St:Sebastain Church North Kidangoor.

== Residents associations ==
- Nethaji Nagar Residents Association [NRA]
- Kidangoor Residents Association [KRA]
- Shanthi Ngaar Residents Association
- Gandhi nagar Residents Association
- Haritha nagar Residents Association
- Green Feeld Residents Association
- Kidangoor South Residents Association (KSRA)

== Clubs ==
- Presidency Club
- Sree Muruka Arts and Sports Club

== Gallery ==
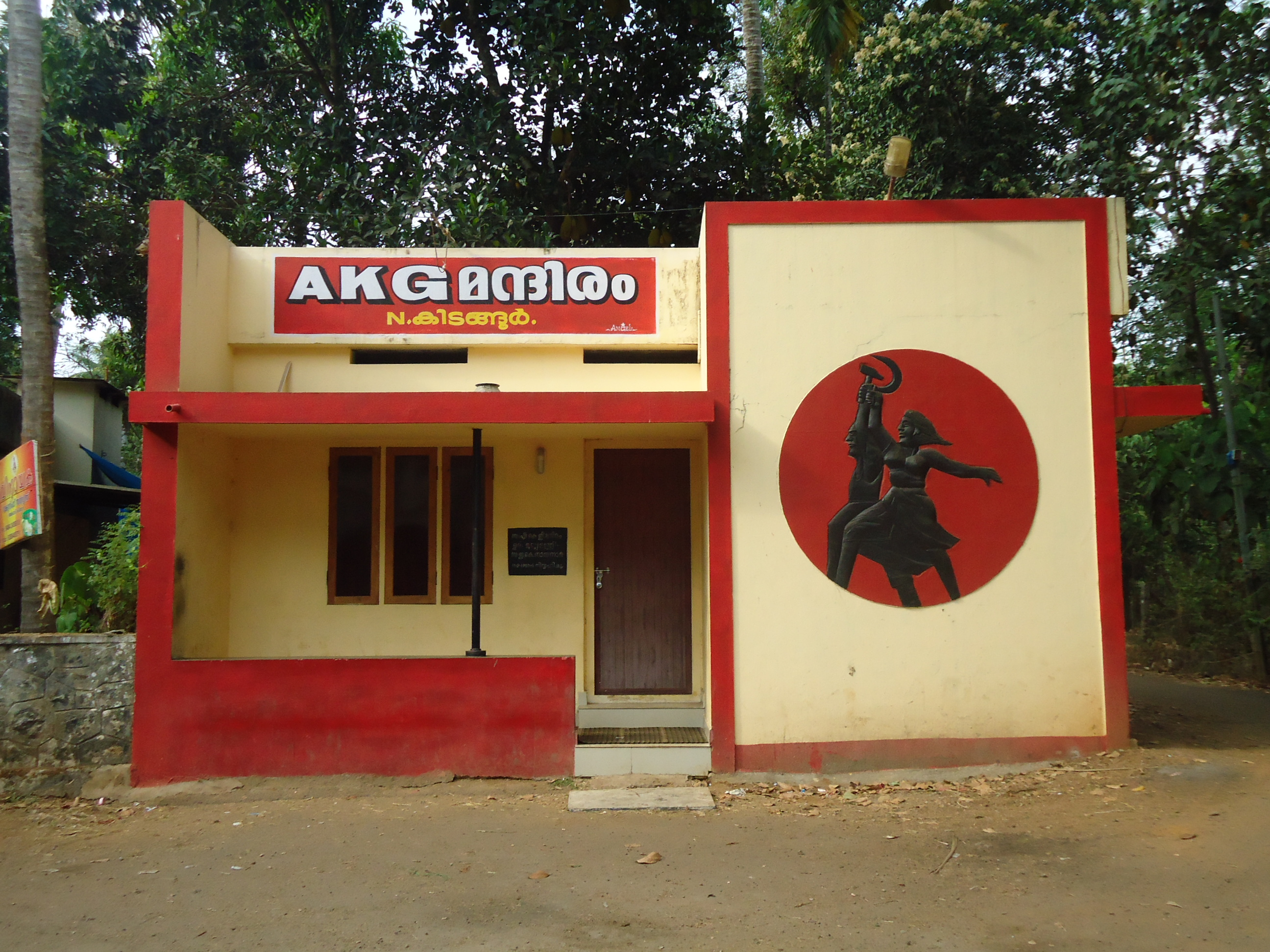
AKG Centre N.Kidangoor

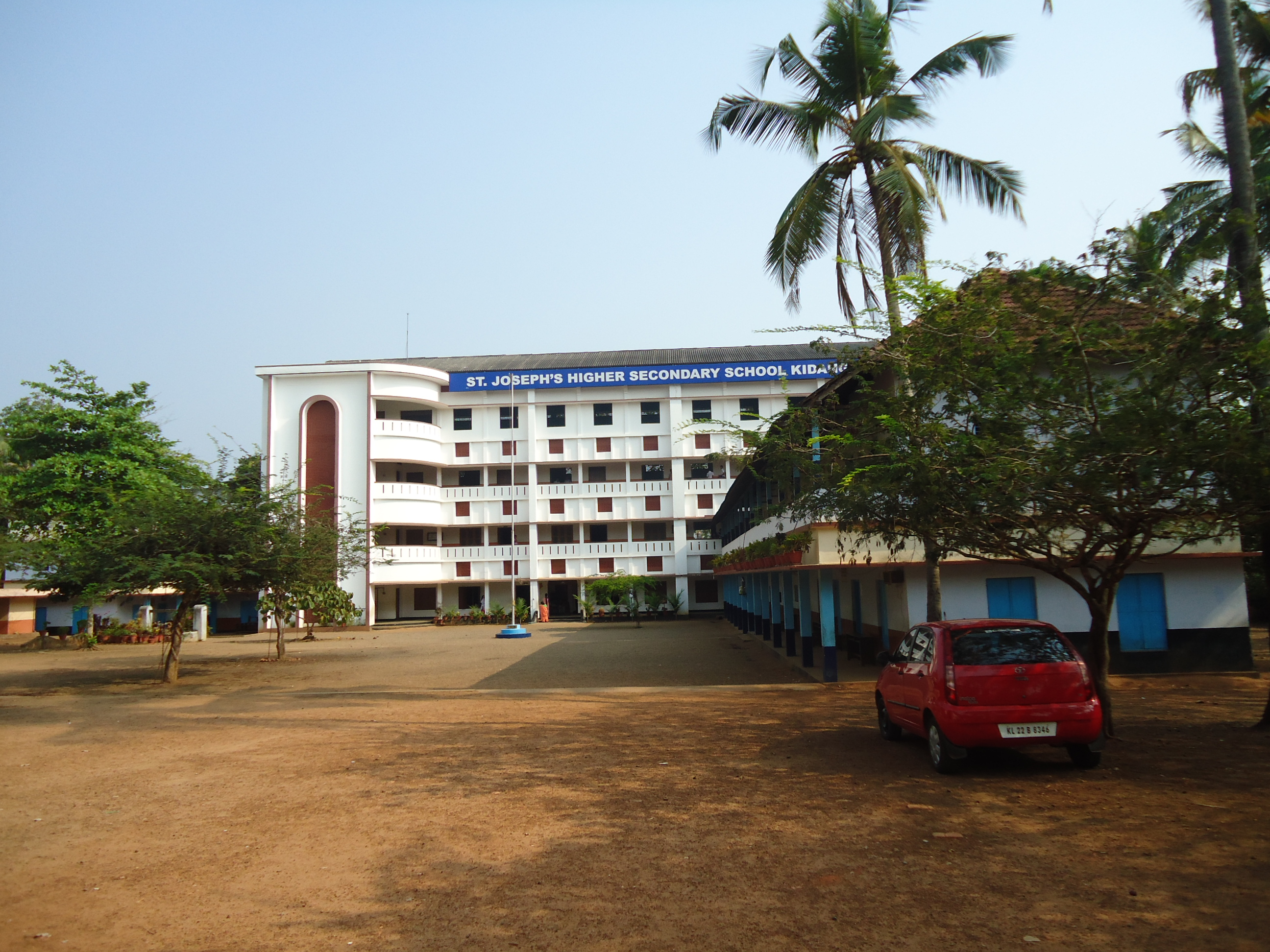
St Joseph HS

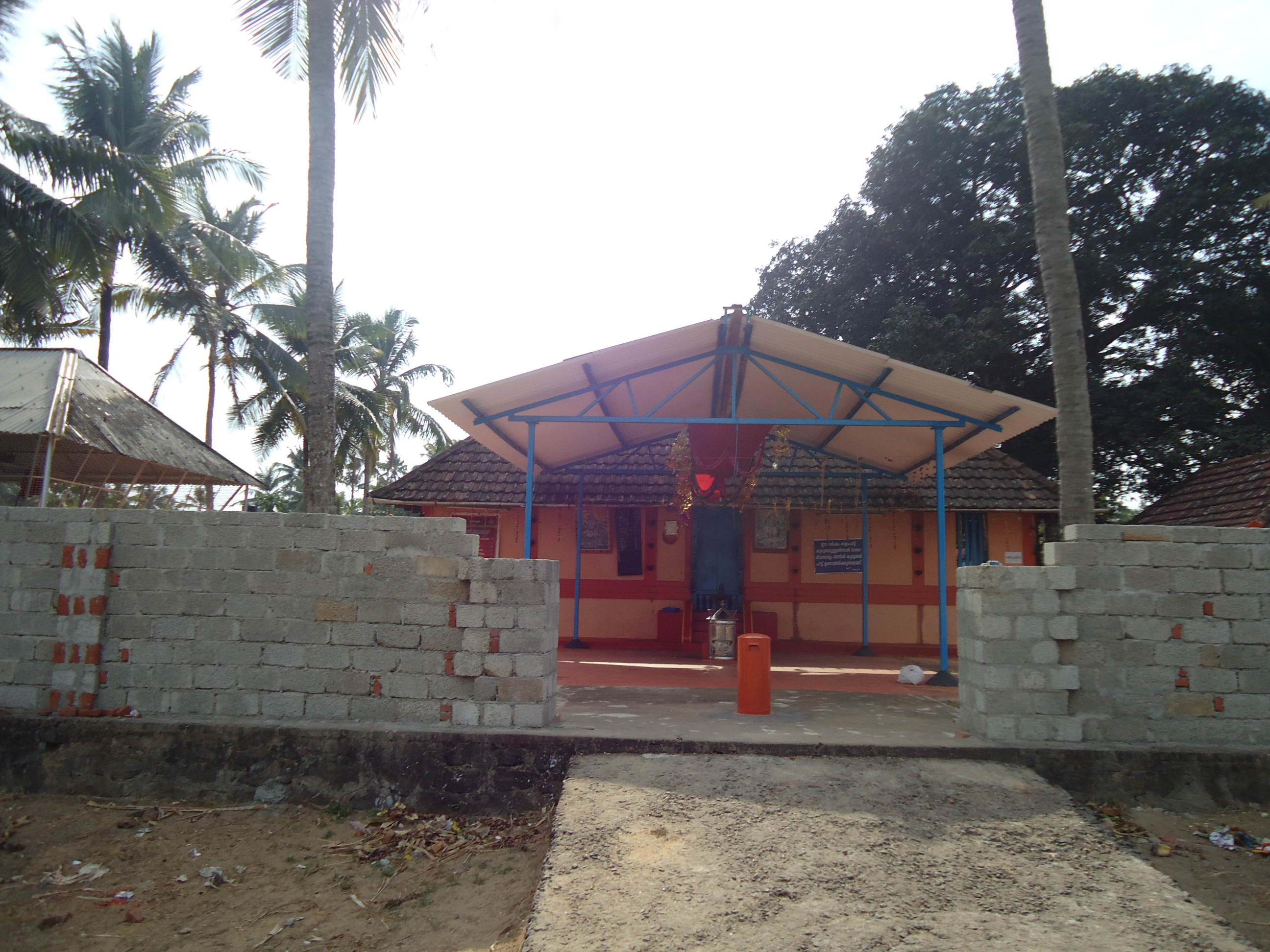
Kulappurakavu Devi Temple

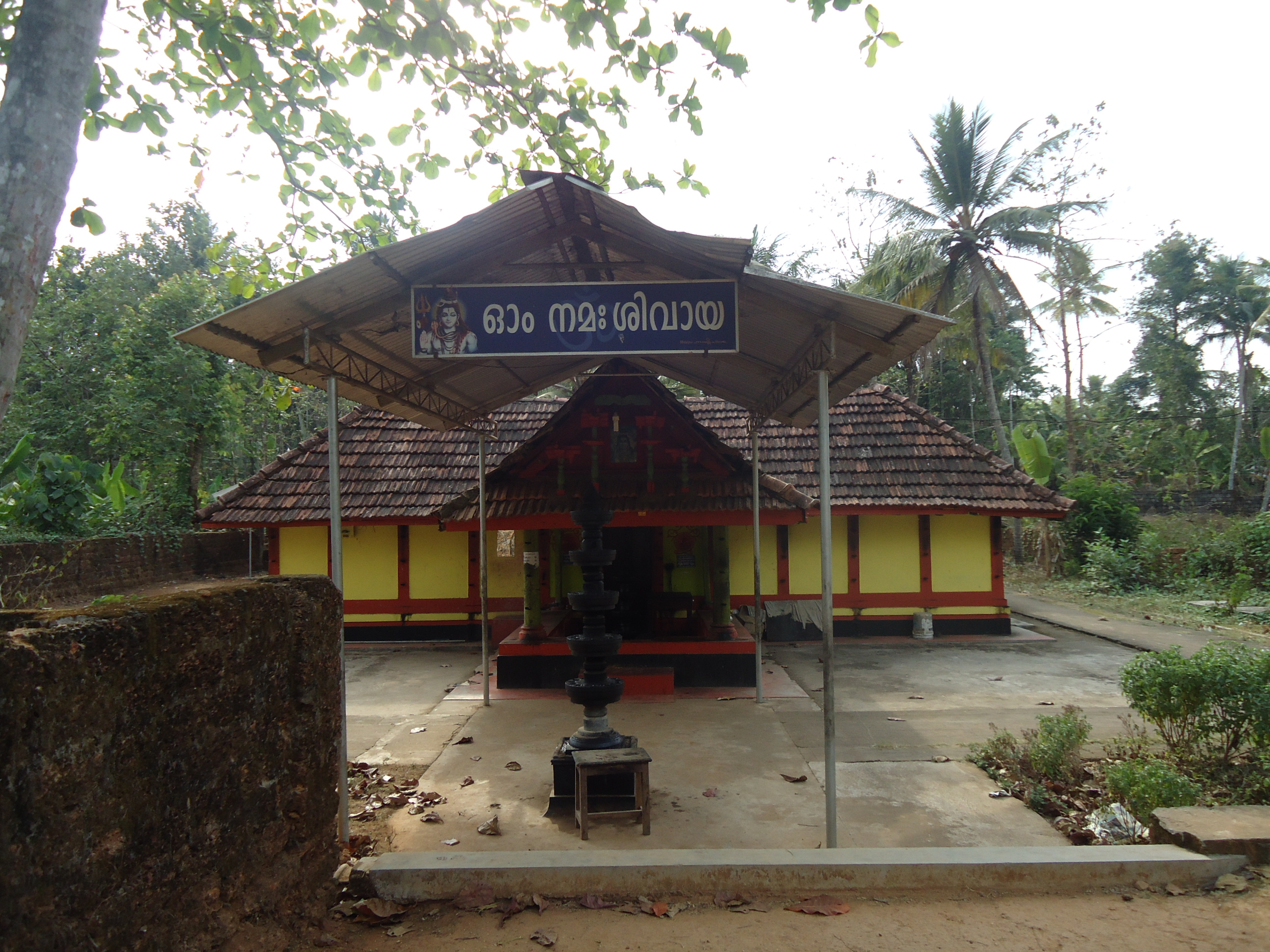
Kavalakattu Siva Temple

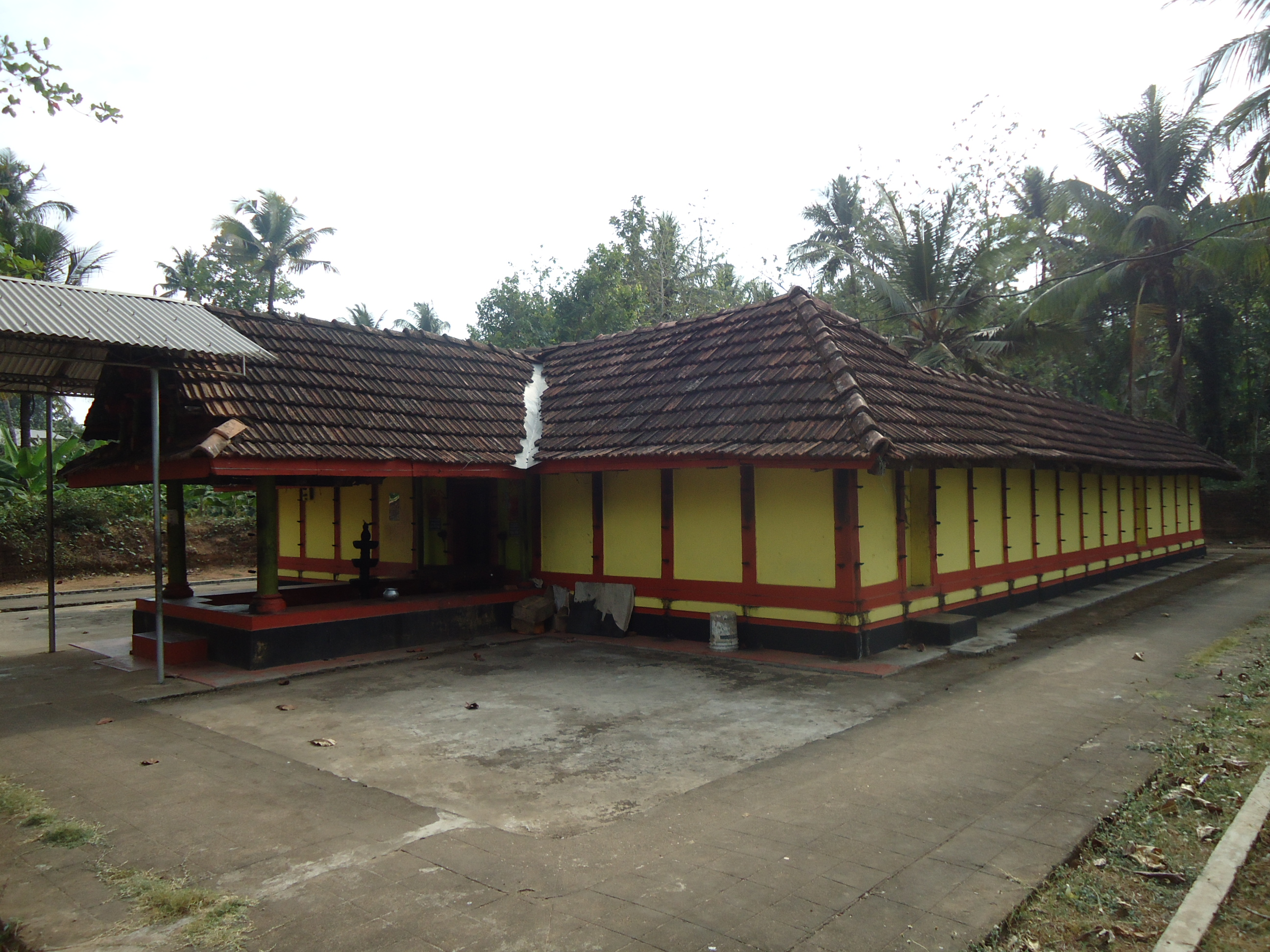
Kavalakattu Siva Temple

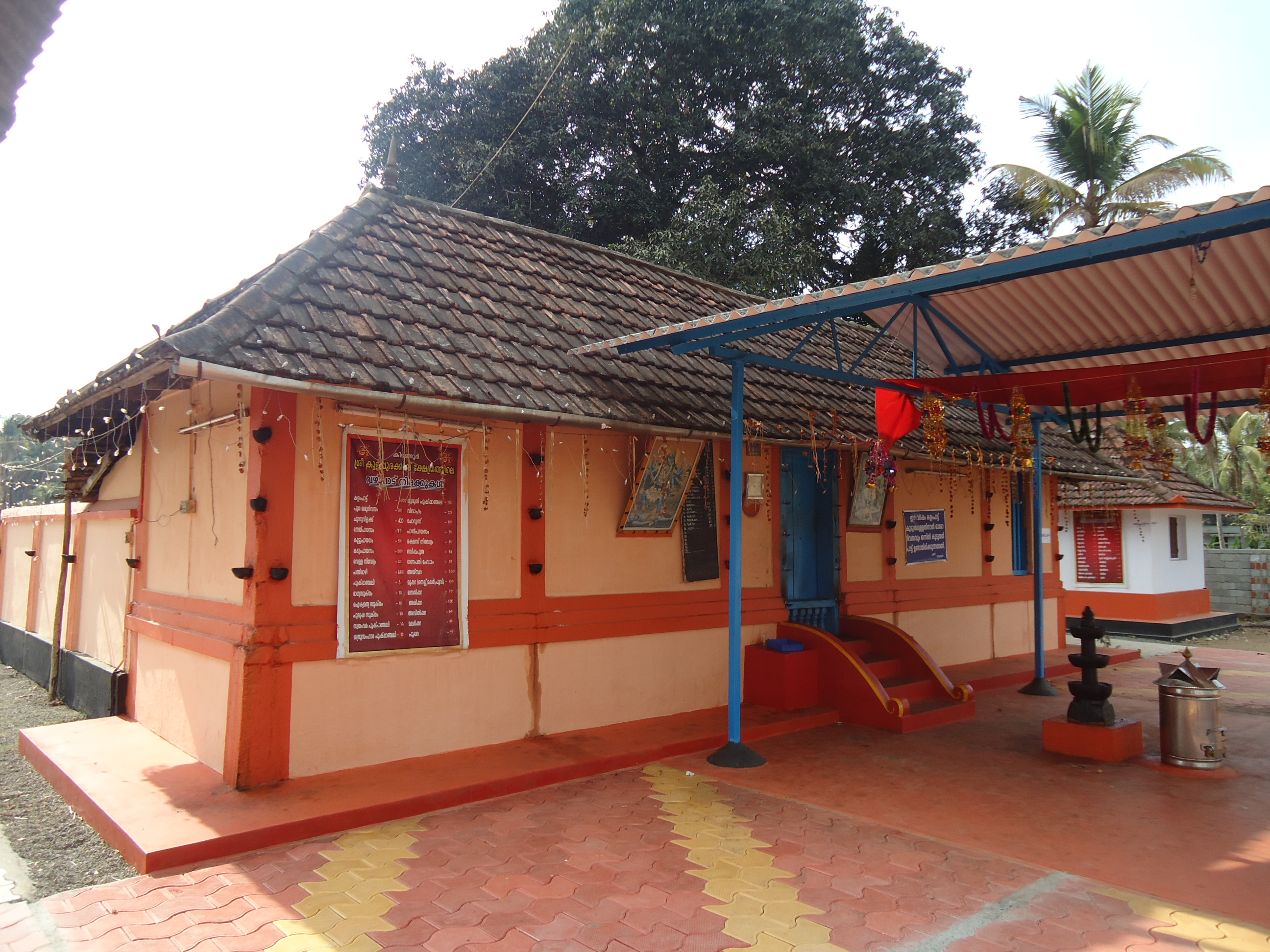
Kulappurakavu Devi Temple

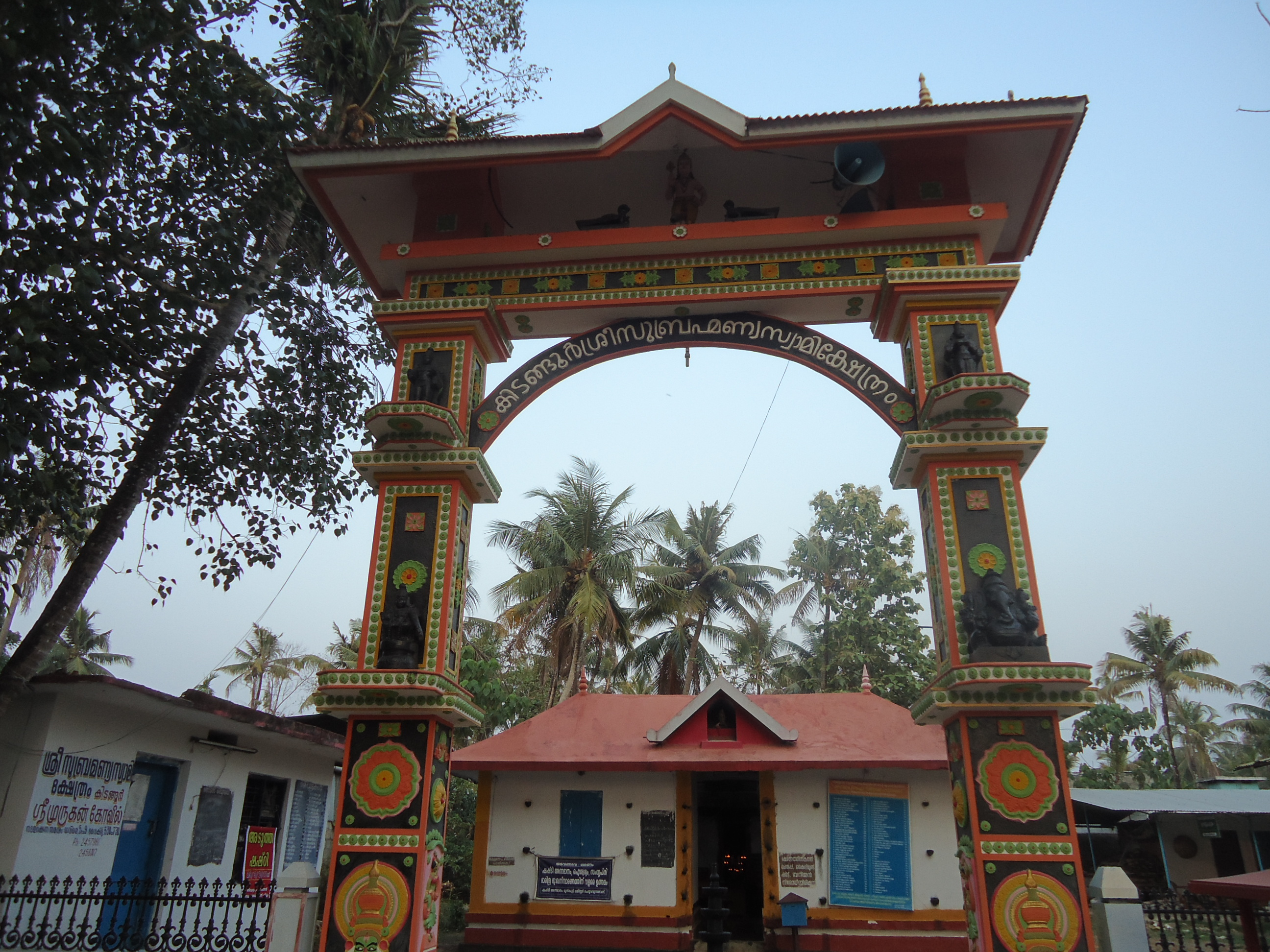
Sree Subramanya Swami Temple

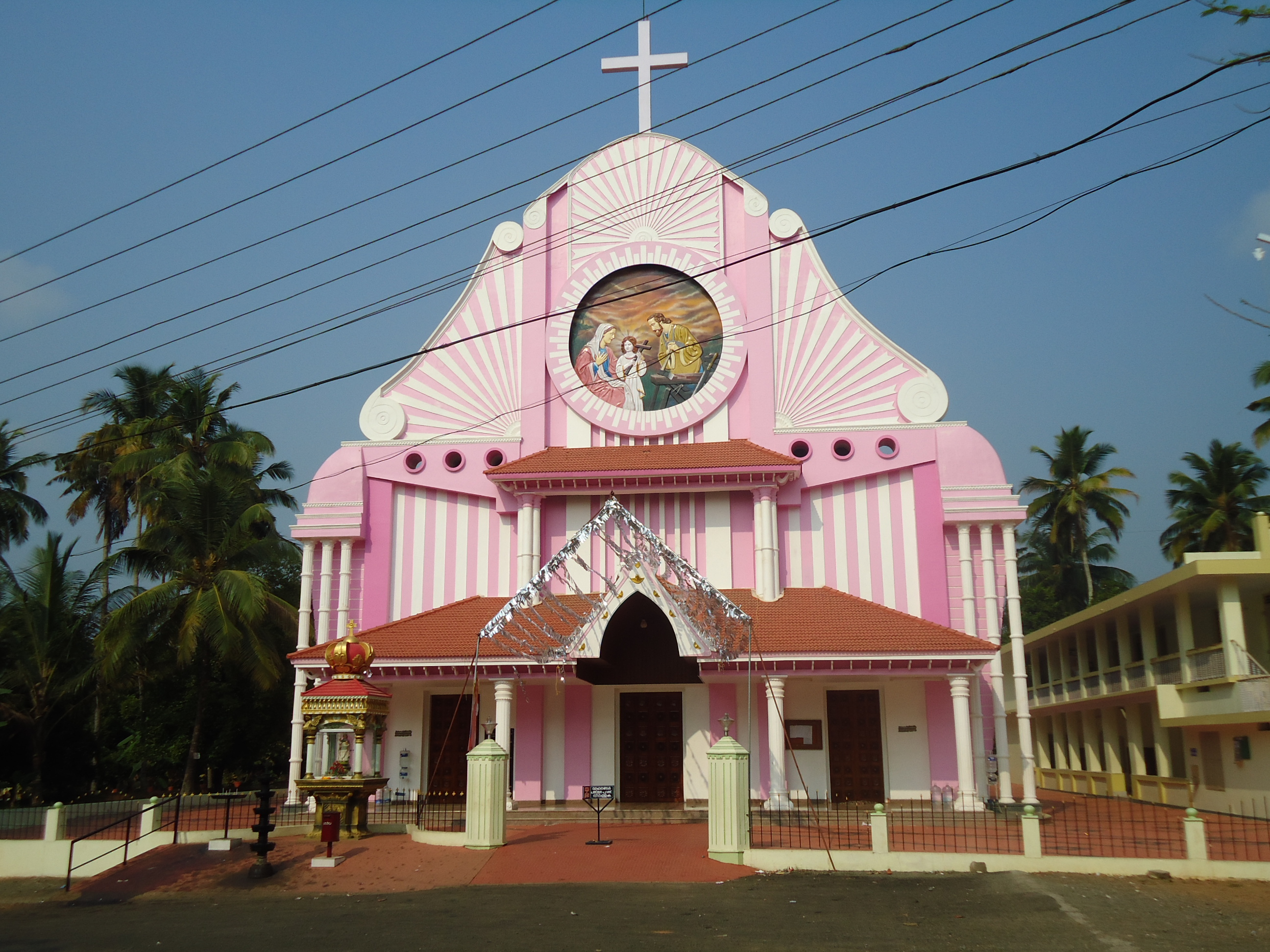
Infant Jesus Church kidangoor

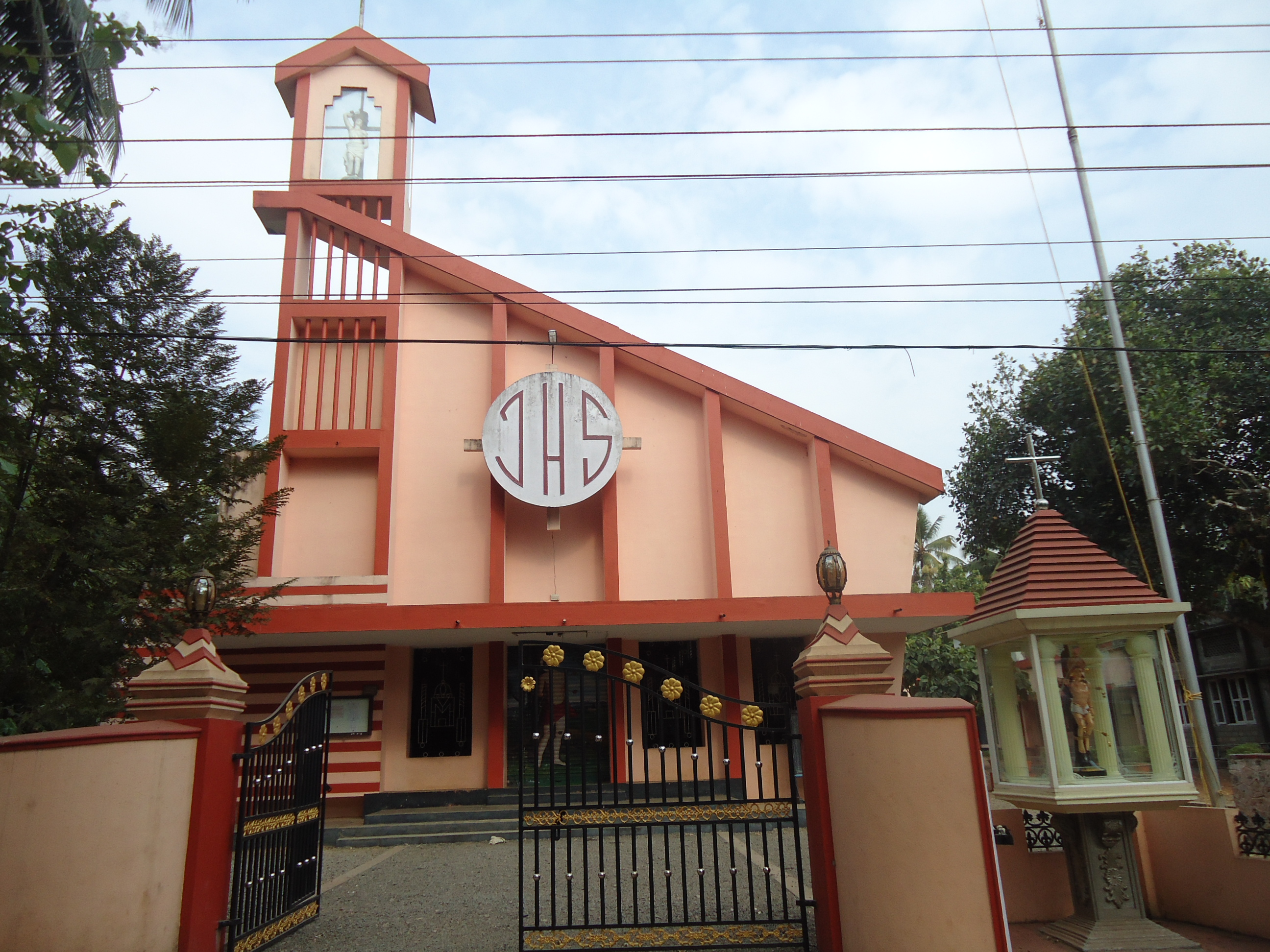
St Sebastians Church

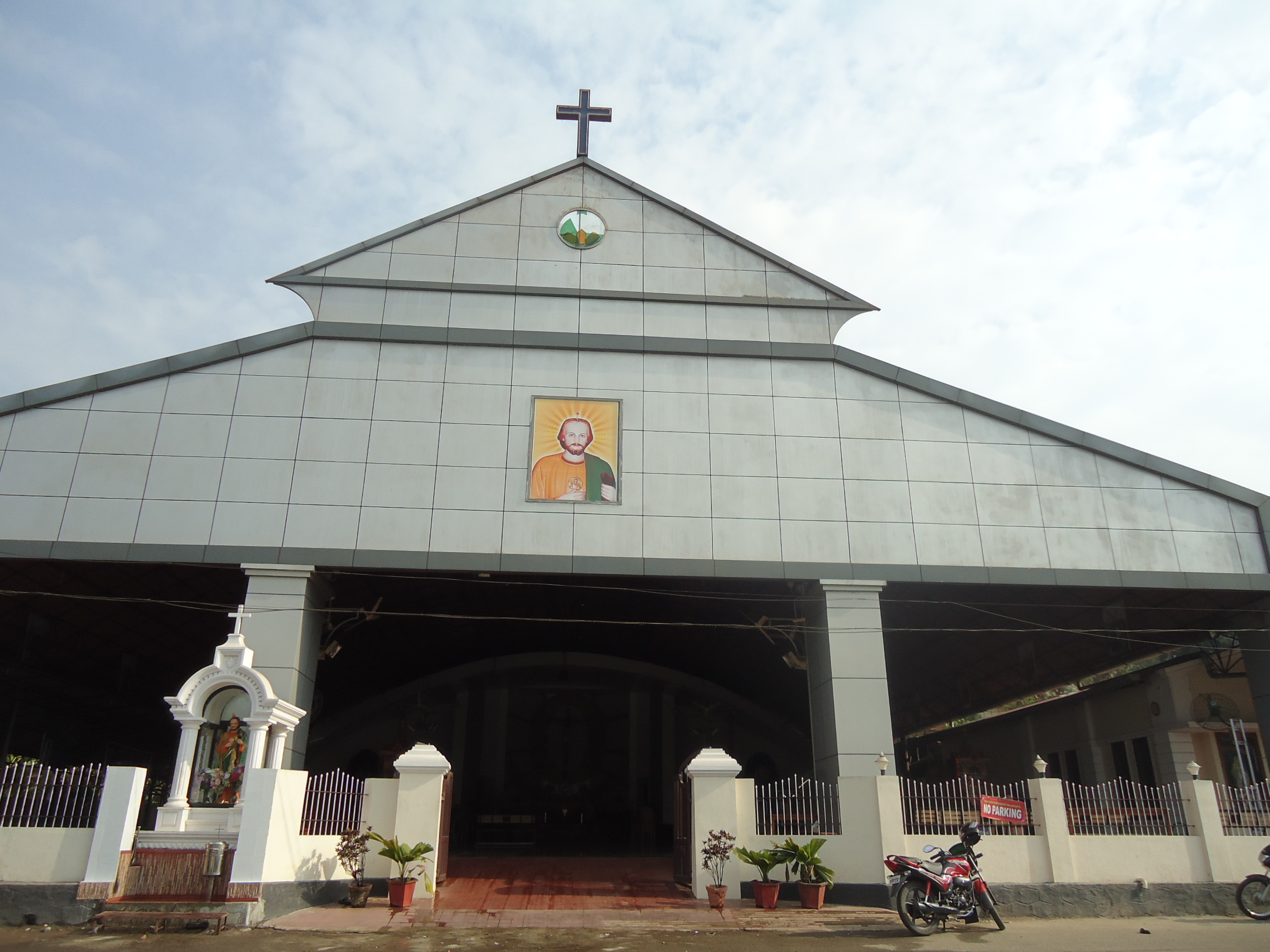
Yoodhapuram church
