= List of state highways in Kerala =

The state highways are arterial routes of a state, linking district headquarters and important towns within the state and connecting them with national highways or Highways of the neighbouring states. There are 83 state highways in Kerala. (SH 4, SH 13, SH 20, SH 24 and SH 35 were upgraded to National highways)

Sl.No	District	State Highways
1	Trivandrum	180.36
2	Kollam	123.79
3	Alappuzha	170.841
4	Pathanamthitta	249.194
5	Kottayam	406.531
6	Idukki	998.372
7	Ernakulam	325.206
8	Thrissur	374.033
9	Palakkad	245.987
10	Malappuram	374.764
11	Kozhikode	420.173
12	Wayanad	128.955
13	Kannur	244.665
14	Kasaragod	141.78
	Total	4341.651

State highway No	State highway name	OSM Relation	Route	Passes through - District(s)	Length (in km)
SH 1	Main-Central Road (MC Road)	1470516	Kesavadasapuram - Vembayam - Venjaramoodu - Kilimanoor - Chadayamangalam- Ayoor -Kottarakara - Adoor - Pandalam - Kulanada - Chengannur - Thiruvalla - Changanassery - Kottayam - Ettumanoor - Kuravilangad - Koothattukulam - Muvattupuzha - Perumbavoor - Kalady - Angamaly	Thiruvananthapuram, Kollam, Pathanamthitta, Alappuzha, Kottayam, Ernakulam	240.6
SH 1	Kazhakoottam - Venjaramoodu Main-Central Road Bypass (MC BYPASS)	1470516	Kazhakoottam (Vettu road jn) - Pothencode - Venjaramoodu (Thaikkad jn)	Thiruvananthapuram	13
SH 2	Thiruvananthapuram - Shenkottai Highway (TS Road)	1471018	Thiruvananthapuram - Peroorkada - Nedumangad - Chullimanoor - Palode - Madathara - Kulathupuzha - Thenmala (joins with Kollam - Shenkottai National Highway (NH 744)	Thiruvananthapuram - Kollam	73.2
SH 3	Nedumangad - Aruvaimozhi Highway	5944951	Nedumangad - Aryanad - Paruthipally - Vazhichal - Kudappanamoodu -Kathipara - Kadukkara - State boundary (continues as Tamil Nadu SH45 till Aruvaimozhi)	Thiruvananthapuram	37.5
SH 4	Kollam-Aryankavu		Declared as NH 744 now	Kollam - Aryankavu	
SH 5	Kayamkulam - Pathanapuram Highway	1470904	Kayamkulam - Kattanam -Charummod - Nooranad - Adoor - Kallumkadavu Junction (Pathanapuram)	Alappuzha - Pathanamthitta - Kollam	42.5
SH 6	Kayamkulam - Thiruvalla Highway	5944972	Kayamkulam - Chettikulangara - Pela - Mavelikkara - Chennithala - Mannar - Parumala - Pulikeezhu - Kavumbhagom - Thiruvalla (joining SH 7)	Alappuzha - Pathanamthitta	30.8
SH 7	Thiruvalla - Kumbazha Highway	5944995	SCS junction, Thiruvalla - Vallamkulam - Eraviperoor - Kumbanad - Pullad - Maramon - Kozhencherry - Thekkemala Junction - Elanthoor - Pathanamthitta - Kumbazha Junction joins Main Eastern Highway| SH 8	Pathanamthitta	32.8
SH 8	Main Eastern Highway (Punalur - Muvattupuzha) (PM Road)	5712709	Pallimikku Junction (Punalur) (starts from km 44/900 of NH 208) - Pathanapuram - Kallumkadavu Junction (joins SH 05) - Kalanjoor - Koodal - Konni junction, (joins SH 80)Konni- Kumbazha (Pathanamthitta, meets T.K.Road / SH - 07) - Mylapra - Mannarakulanji - Uthimmoodu - Mandiram - Ranni - Makkapuzha - Ponthanpuzha - Karikkattoor - Manimala - Cheruvally - Ponkunnam - Elamgulam - Pala - Thodupuzha - Vazhakulam - Nirmala College junction - Muvattupuzha(joins MC Road -SH 01)	Kollam - Pathanamthitta - Kottayam - Idukki - Ernakulam	153.6
SH 9	Kottayam - Kozhencherry Highway	5945010	Kanjikuzhi - Puthupally - Karukachal - Mallappally - Vennikulam - Pullad (Kozhencherry) (joins T.K.Road / SH - 07)	Kottayam - Pathanamthitta	44.4
SH 10	Mavelikkara - Kozhencherry Highway	5708146	Mavelikkara - Puthiyacavu - Kollakadavu - Cheriyanad - Puliyoor - Perissery - Chengannur - Puthencavu - Arattupuzha - Malakkara - Edayaranmula - Aranmula - Thekkemala Junction (Kozhenchery)	Alappuzha - Pathanamthitta	28.7
SH 11	Alappuzha - Changanassery Highway	5941258	Alappuzha (starts at km 415/500 of NH 66) - Pazhaveedu - Pallathuruthy - Nedumudy - Mancombu - Ramankari - Kidangara - Changanassery (joins MC Road)	Alappuzha - Kottayam	24.2
SH 12	Ambalapuzha - Thiruvalla Highway	5941295	Ambalapuzha (NH 66) - Thakazhy - Edathua - Thalavady - Podiyadi Junction (Kayamkulam - Thiruvalla Highway SH 06) joins - Thiruvalla (joins MC Road)	Alappuzha - Pathanamthitta	27.2
SH 13	Kottayam-Kumily		Declared as NH 183 now	Kottayam - Idukki	
SH 14	Erattupetta - Peermade Highway	5941291	Erattupetta - Vellikulam - Wagamon - Road joins with Pullikkanam Elappara road Pattithanam junction	Kottayam - Idukki	24.3
SH 15	Ettumanoor - Ernakulam Highway	5702269	Ettumanoor (Main Central Road SH 01) - Kothanalloor - Kuruppanthara - Kaduthuruthy- Thalayolaparambu- Vaikom - Udayamperoor - Thripunithura - Vyttila - Pallimukku Junction	Kottayam - Ernakulam	57.3
SH 16	Aluva-Munnar Road	1470930	Aluva - Chembarakky - Ponjassery - Perumbavoor - Kuruppumpady - Kothamangalam [Joins National Highway 85 (India)] - Neriamangalam - Adimali - Munnar	Ernakulam - Idukki	114.4
SH 17	Northern outlet road (Munnar Udumalpet road)	5710613	Munnar (starts from Aluva - Munnar Highway) - Road to Rajamudi - Anakkalpetty road - Chinnar river (State boundary) Road continues to Udumalaipettai	Idukki	59.1
SH 18	Munnar - Top Station Highway	5941241	Munnar (starts from km 113/6 of Aluva - Munnar road) - Madypatty dam - Indo Swiss Project Gate - Top Station - State boundary - Road continues to Tamil Nadu as part of Kodaikanal–Munnar Road	Idukki - Kerala Tamil Nadu border	32.1
SH 19	Munnar - Kumily Highway	5948399	Munnar (starts from km 0/2 of Munnar Topstation Highway) - Devikolam town - Poopara - Kumbanpara road starts - Pooppara - Bodimettu road starts - Santhanpara Jn - Udumbumchola town - Vattappara junction - Amaravathy - Kumily (joins Kottayam Kumily Highway)	Idukki	106.0
SH 20	Tripunithura - Kothamangalam Rd		Declared as NH 49 on 1989	Ernakulam	
SH 21	Chalakudy - Anamala Highway	5246883	Chalakudy (NH 47) - Athirappilly - Vazhachal - Peringalkuthu - Approach road to Sholayar Power House - Anamala - State boundary	Thrissur - Palakkad	86.0
SH 22	Kodungallur - Shornur Highway	1470505	Kodungallur (NH17) - Irinjalakuda crosses SH 61- Pallisseri - Joins NH 47 - Joins NH 17 - Paramekkavu temple - Viyyur - Mulamkunnathukavu - Vadakkancherry - Cheruthuruthy junction - joins SH 23 Shornur - Perinthalmanna Highway	Thrissur(63.312), Palakkad	70.5
SH 23	Shornur - Perinthalmanna Highway	5947659	Shornur Railway Station - Rice Research Station, Pattambi - Pollachi road takes off - Sankaramangalam junction - Cherukara - Perinthalmanna junction - joins SH 24	Palakkad - Malappuram	39.3
SH 24	Kozhikode - Palakkad		Declared as NH 213 on 2000	Kozhikode - Malappuram - Palakkad	
SH 25	Tattamangalam- Chittur Nattukal Highway	5705116	Mettupalayam junction, Tattamangalam- Chittur - Nattukal junction (joins Nattukal - Velamthavalam Highway)SH 26	Palakkad	14.2
SH 26	Nattukal - Velanthavalam Highway	5686057	Nattukal junction - Palakkad - Pollachi road - Velanthavalam junction - road continues to Tamil Nadu	Palakkad - Kerala - Tamil Nadu border	11.6
SH 27	Palakkad- Koduvayur - Tattamangalam - Meenakshipuram highway	5686291	Palakkad Collectorate - Kannady - Koduvayur - Tattamangalam- Mettupalayam junction, Tattamangalam- Ayyappankavu temple - Nanniyode - Meenakshipuram - Gopalapuram - Meenakshipuram road joins - Kerala State boundary - Road continues to Pollachi in Tamil Nadu	Palakkad	35.0
SH 28	Valluvambram- Nilambur - Nadukani Highway	5673437	Valluvambram -Manjeri - Nilambur - Chungathara- Edakkara - Vazhikadavu - State boundary	Malappuram - Kerala-Tamil Nadu border	62.6
SH 29	Kozhikode - Vythiri - Gudallur Highway	5673437	NH 212 - Malabar Christian College - Civil Station Kozhikode–Kunnamangalam - Padanilam - Thamarassery - LeavesNH212 - Chellot - Chitragiri - State Boundary - Road to Gudallor	Kozhikode - Wayanad - Kerala-Tamil Nadu State border	97.0
SH 30	Thalassery- Coorg Highway	5670623	Thalassery - NH 66 - Kadirur - Nirmalagiri College - Mattannur- Iritty - Koottupuzha - State Boundary	Kannur - Kerala-Karnataka State Border	55.1
SH 31	Kalladka - Cherkala road	5676778	Cherkala (NH17) - Badiadka junction - SPP Road joins - Adakasthala - State border	Kasargodu - Kerala-Karnataka State Border	28.8
SH 32	Ettumanoor - Erattupetta - Poonjar road	5939284	Athirapuzha landing - SH 1 crosses - Cherpunkal - SH 3 crosses and overlaps - Pala Market - Bharananganam town - Erattupetta town - Poonjar	Kottayam	37.9
SH 33	Thodupuzha- Puliyanmala road	5717553	Thodupuzha junction SH 8 - Muttom - Kuruthikulam - Meenmutty - Painavu junction - Road to Idukki dam takes off - Kattappana junction - Puliyanmala - joins Munnar - Kumily road	Idukki	92.1
SH 34	Koyilandy - Balussery - Thamarassery - Omassery – Mukkom – Areakode -Edavanna Road	5679056	Koyilandy town - Ulliyeri - Balusseri - Poonur -Thamarssery - Omassery - Mukkam - Arekode - [joins SH 29 - Edavanna junction (joins Kozhikode - Nilambur - Gudalloor Highway)	Kozhikode - Malappuram - Kerala-Tamil Nadu State Border	70.0
SH 36	Taliparamba – Iritty Road	5670786	Taliparamba - Sreekantapuram - Irikkur - Iritty (joins SH 30)	Kannur	46.5
SH 37	Adoor - Sasthamkotta road	5948397	Adoor - Thuvayoor - Bharanikavu junction - Sasthamkotta junction	Pathanamthitta - Kollam	18.2
SH 38	Puthiyangadi Kuthuparamba – Chovva bypass	5671002	Puthiyangadi – Ulleri – Perambra – Kuttiyadi – Nadapuram – Mekkunnu – Panoor – Koothuparamba – Chovva bypass	Kozhikode - Kannur	107
SH 39	Perumbilavu - Nilambur Road	5246652	Perumbilavu – Koottanad - Pattambi – Perinthalmanna - Pattikkadu– Melattur –Karuvarakundu – Kalikavu – Nilambur Road	Malappuram - Palakkad - Thrissur	107.112
SH 40	Alappuzha – Madurai Road	2385041	Alappuzha – Muhamma – Thanneermukkam – Vechur Bund Road – Thalayolaparambu – Peruva – Mutholapuram –Marika - Vazhithala – Kolani – Thodupuzha – Vannapram -Thopramkudy – Nedumkandam - Thookkupalam - Cumbummettu	Alappuzha - Kottayam - Idukki - Kerala-Tamil Nadu State Border	114.815
SH 41	Ernakulam – Thekkady Road	5702367	Palarivattom – Kakkanad – Pallikkara – Kizhakkambalam – Pattimattom - Valamboor – Muvattupuzha – Arakuzha - Pandappilly - Manakkad - Thodupuzha - Chottupara – Upputhara – Kumily - Thekkady	Ernakulam - Idukki	155.1
SH 42	Kumarakom – Cumbammettu – Cumbam Road	5717097	Kumarakom – Edayazham – Kallara – Kaduthuruthy – Neezhoor – Elanji - Piravam – Vazhithala – Karimkunnam –Thodupuzha - Velliyamattom – Kulamavu – Cheruthoni – Rajamudi –Thopramkudy -Prakash- Kallar - Cumbammettu – Cumbam	Kottayam - Ernakulam - Idukki	190.0
SH 43	Muvattupuzha – Theni Road	5719115	Muvattupuzha –Kallurkkad – Kodikulam – Idukki – Mariyapuram – Erattayar – Kattappana – Puliyanmala – Chettukuzhi - Cumbammettu – Cumbam - Teni	Eranakulam - Idukki	105
SH 44	Sabarimala – Neriamangalam Road	5948370	Pamba – Chalakayam – Thulappilly -Pambavalley – Mukkootuthara – Erumeli – Koovappally – Kanjirappally – Kappadu – kalaketty - Chemmalamattam– Thidanadu – Erattupetta – Melukavu – Muttom – Thodupuzha – Neriyamangalam	Pathanamthitta - Kottayam - Idukki - Ernakulam	152
SH 45	Thiruvananthapuram - Ponmudi Road	5941390	(Starting from SH 2- Chullimanoor junction - Tholicodu - Vithura - Anappara - Kallar - Lower Sanatorium - Ponmudi Upper Sanatorium	Thiruvananthapuram(61.0)	61.0
SH 46	Kilimanoor-Attingal Road	5705120	Kilimanoor central junction.(SH 1 - MC Road) - Nagaroor - Vanchiyoor - Alamcode junction (joins with NH 47)	Thiruvananthapuram(10.8)	10.7
SH 47	Nedumangad- Attingal Road	5678227	Pazhakutty junction (starts from SH 02) - Vembayam -Venjaramoodu (joins SH 1) - Valakkad- Attingal (ends at NH 66)	Thiruvananthapuram (27.00)	27.00
SH 48	Ayoor – Punalur Road	5705119	Ayoor–Anchal–Karavaloor–Punalur(joins NH 208)	Kollam	20
SH 49	Guruvayoor – Choondal Road	5246953	Guruvayoor – Chowallurpady - Choondal	Thrissur	7.275
SH 50	Chavakkad – Vadakkancherry Road	5246388	Chavakkad - Mammiyur–Kottapadi–Kunnamkulam-Marthancode-Pannithadam-Vellarikad-Erumapetty-Wadakancherry	Thrissur(31.015)	31.515
SH 51	Kodakara – Kodungallur Road	5246361	Kodakara (NH 47)- Aloor Jn crosses SH 61- Ashtamichira- Mala- Keezhthali jn (joins NH 17)- Kodungallur	Thrissur(25.956)	27
SH 52	Palakkad - Pollachi road	5686100	Palakkad (NH 47) - Athicode junction (SH 26 crosses) - Gopalapuram (State boundary - road continues to Pollachi in Tamil Nadu)	Palakkad	29.9
SH 53	Palakkad – Perinthalmanna Road	5681092	Mundur – Kongad – Cherpulassery junction (Pattambi - Cherpulassery road joins) - Thootha - Anamangad – Perinthalmanna - joins SH 39	Palakkad - Malappuram	15.5
SH 54	Kozhikode - Thottilppalam - Kalpetta Highway	5673538	Kozhikode - Puthiyangadi – Ulliyeri – Perambra – Thottilppalam - Kuttiady – Padinjarathara – Kalpetta	Kozhikode - Wayanad	99.0
SH 55	Cherkkala – Jalsoor Road	5676851	Cherkala junction (Km 58/0 of NH 17) – Mulleria – Adhur – Kottipady - Panachikad	Kasaragod	39.1
SH 56	Kanhangad – Panathoor Road	5676433	Kanhangad – Eriya – Poodamkallu – Rajapuram – Kolichal - Panathoor - Chemberi	Kasaragod	44.1
SH 57	Kasaragod – Kanhangad Road	13341479	Kasaragod – Uduma – Bakel - Pallikkara – Chamandikunnu - Kanhangad South	Kasaragod	28.0
SH 58	Vadakkancherry – Pollachi Road	1471043	Vadakkancherry – Mudapallur – Nemmara – Kollengode – Muthalamada – Govindapuram – ending at Pollachi in Tamil Nadu	Thrissur - Palakkad - Kerala-Tamil Nadu State border	39
SH 59	Hill Highway (Kerala) Kasaragode (Nandarappadavu - Thiruvananthapuram (Kaliyikkavilai) Highway	5671426	Nandarappadavu (Kasargode District) - Parassala (Thiruvananthapuram District)	Kasargodu - Kannur - Wayanad - Kozhikode - Malappuram - Palakkad-Thrissur - Eranakulam - Idukki - Kottayam - Pathanamthitta - Kollam - Thiruvananthapuram	1332.16
SH 60	Angadipuram – Pariyapuram – Cherukara Road	5686276	Angadipuram – Pariyapuram – Cherukara	Malappuram	7.61
SH 61	Potta – Moonupeedika Road	5246358	Potta starts from NH 544 – Irinjalakuda crosses SH 22 – Padiyur - Moonupeedika meets NH 66	Thrissur(22.058)	27.665
SH 62	Guruvayoor – Althara – Ponnani road	5246955	Guruvayoor - Althara – Perumpadappu – Maranchery – Kanjiramukku – Kundukadavu (joins Palakkad - Ponnani road)	Thrissur(14.858), Malappuram	28.97
SH 63	Vypeen-Pallippuram road	1471038	Vypeen – Njarakkal – Cherai – Pallippuram - Munambam	Eranakulam	25.5
SH 64	Varkala-Parippally-Madathara road	5703271	Varkala-Nadayara-Chavercode-Palayamkunnu-Parippally-Pallickal-Nilamel(joins MC Road)-Kadakkal-Madathara(joins SH 02)	Thiruvananthapuram - Kollam	45
SH 65	Parappanangadi-Areacode road	5686018	Parappanangadi – Thirurangadi – AR Nagar – Kondotty – Alinchode - Puthalam junction (joins Koyilandy - Edavanna SH at Puthalam jn 1.6 km away from Areacode)	Malappuram	40.45
SH 66	Alappuzha-Arthunkal-Chellanam- Thoppumpady(Kochi) road	3837785	Alappuzha - Arthunkal - Chellanam Thoppumpady	Alappuzha - Ernakulam	51.72
SH 67	Mannarkulanji-Pamba road	5705106	Mannarkulanji – Vadasserikkara – Laha – Plappally – Nilackal – Chalakayam - Pampa Thriveni Bridge	Pathanamthitta	56.75
SH 68	Kappad-Thusharagiri-Adivaram road	5678389	Kappad – Atholi Town - Cheekkilode - Nanminda – Narikkuni – Kavilummaram - Koduvally - Omassery - Kodencheri - Thusharagiri - Adivaram	Kozhikode	68.11
SH 69	Thrissur-Kuttippuram road	5246349	Thrissur – Choondal – Kunnamkulam – Perumpilavu – Naduvattom – Edappal – Thavanoor – Thrikkanapuram (joins NH 17)	Thrissur(34.315), Malappuram	52.65
SH 70	Karuvarakundu -Melatttur Road	5681316	Punnakkad – Iringattiri – Melattoor (Joins Kumaramputhur - Olipuzha road)	Malappuram	9.82
SH 71	Tirur-Malappuram-Manjeri road	5680869	Tirur–vailathur - Edarikode - Kottakkal - Puthur - Mannoor - Vadakkemanna - Malappuram - Panayi - Manjeri	Malappuram	39.0
SH 72	Malappuram-Parappanangadi road	5680911	Malappuram (Km 48/9 of NH 213 and overlaps NH 213 for 2.0 km from the starting point) – Panakkad – Vengara - Thirurangadi Joins Areacode Parappanangadi Road	Malappuram	29
SH 73	Valanchery Nilambur Road	5235026	Valanchery -Angadipuram -Wandoor -Vadapuram- Nilambur	Malappuram	51.41
SH 74	Chelakkara Road	3908351	Vazhakode - Chelakkara - Alathur	Thrissur - Palakkad	33.69
SH 75	Thrissur - Kanjani - Vadanappally Road	3906091	Thrissur - Kanjani - Vadanappally	Thrissur	16.12
SH 76	Kuranchery - Velur Road	3905318	Kuranchery - Velur - Kechery	Thrissur	12.838
SH 77	Lakkidi Road in Thrissur and Palakkad Districts	3905305	Lakkidi road-Pambadi Road-Lakkidi Railway Station Road	Palakkad	11.857
SH 83	Kunnamangalam - Wayanad Tunnel - Kalpetta road		Kunnamangalam - NIT - Agastianmuzhi(Mukkam) - Thiruvambady - Anakkampoyil - Wayanad Tunnel - Meppadi - Kalpetta	Kozhikode, Wayanad	58.138

== See also ==
- Roads in Kerala
