= State Highway 48 (Kerala) =

Highway in Kerala, India

State Highway 48
- Ayoor – Punalur Road
- SH 48 highlighted in red

Route information
- Maintained by Kerala Public Works Department
- Length: 20 km (12 mi)

Major junctions
- South end: SH 1 in Ayoor
- SH 59 in Anchal
- North end: NH 744 in Punalur

Location
- Country: India
- State: Kerala
- Districts: Kollam

Highway system
- Roads in India; Expressways; National; State; Asian; State Highways in Kerala
← SH 47	→ SH 49

State Highway 48 (SH 48) is a state highway in Kerala, India that starts in Ayoor and ends in Punalur. The highway is 19.1 km long.

== Route map ==
Ayoor-Anchal (joins Hill Highway SH 59)

== See also ==
- Roads in Kerala
- List of state highways in Kerala
