= State Highway 37 (Kerala) =

Highway in Kerala, India

State Highway 37
- Adoor - Sasthamkotta road
- SH 37 highlighted in red

Route information
- Maintained by Kerala Public Works Department
- Length: 18.2 km (11.3 mi)
- Component highways: NH 183A from Adoor to Bharanikkavu, Kollam

Major junctions
- East end: NH 183A / SH 1 in Adoor
- NH 183 in Bharanikavu near Shasthamkotta
- West end: in Shasthamkotta

Location
- Country: India
- State: Kerala
- Districts: Pathanamthitta, Kollam

Highway system
- Roads in India; Expressways; National; State; Asian; State Highways in Kerala
← SH 36	→ SH 38

State Highway 37 (SH 37) is a state highway in Kerala, India that starts in Adoor and ends in Sasthamkotta. The highway is 18.2 km long.

Almost the entire length of this route is notified as National Highway 183 A.

== Route map ==
Adoor - Thuvayoor - Bharanikavu junction - Sasthamkotta junction

== See also ==
- Roads in Kerala
- List of state highways in Kerala
