= Thevannoor =

- Village
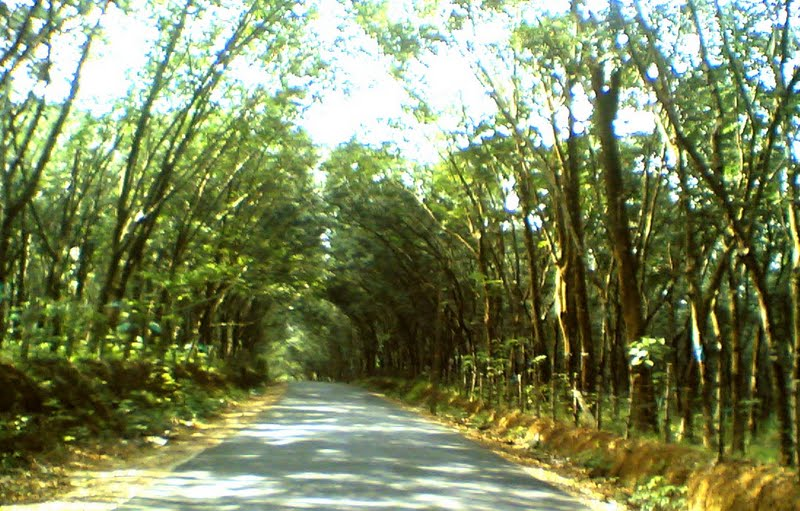
- Thevannoor, Kavalakkapacha Road

- Location in Kerala, India Thevannoor (India)
- Coordinates: 8.897318°N 76.860569°E
- Country: India
- State: Kerala
- District: Kollam

Languages
  - Official: Malayalam, English
- Time zone: UTC+5:30 (IST)
- PIN: 691533
- Telephone code: 0474
- Vehicle registration: KL- 24
- Nearest city: Kollam
- Literacy: 96%
- Lok Sabha constituency: Kollam
- Climate: normal (Köppen)

Thevannoor is a village near Ayoor in Kollam district, Kerala, India.

== History ==
Thevannoor got its name from the Malayalam usage "Thevante Ooru " or "devante ooru" which means "Home Of God ".Here devan or thevan means the bhoodevas, ie; the Brahmins.Thevannoor is a place inhabited by large number of Brahmins from very ancient time onwards. The old village was all inside the Elamadu Panchayathu on four sides with the Thevannoor Devi Kshethram at the center.

== Location ==
Thevannoor as it is known in Malayalam, is today literally the heart of Elamadu. It is linked by MC Road to Thiruvananthapuram and Kollam, and is the point of diversion to Kottarakkara Sree Mahaganapathi Temple.

== School ==
The Panchayath's main Govt.School, as well as the Village Knowledge center, (for long distance buses) are both a few minute walk from the

== Temples ==
Thalirmankunnu Devi Temple, so are most of as well as top cultural venues like Nethaji Smaraka Grandhashala.Some of other major landmarks are Chettupara a 3 layered rock structure which has the footage of Lord Rama, Nethaji Memorial Library.Chettupara gives a recreational comfort to passengers as well as others is just 50 meters ahead of G.H.S.S Thevannoor.

== Nearby places ==
- Anchal - 8 km
- Ambalamkunnu - 7 km
- Ayoor - 4 km
- Elamadu- 4 km
- Kottarakkara - 17 km
- Oyoor - 14 km
- Nilamel - 10 km
- Valakom- 6 km
- Veliyam - 13 km
