= Thiruvananthapuram–Angamaly Greenfield Highway =

Proposed greenfield highway in Kerala, India

Route information
- Maintained by National Highways Authority of India
- Length: 257 km (160 mi)

Major junctions
- South end: Pulimath, Thiruvananthapuram
- North end: Angamaly, Ernakulam

Location
- Country: India
- State: Kerala
- Districts: Thiruvananthapuram, Kollam, Pathanamthitta, Kottayam, Idukki, Ernakulam

Highway system
- Roads in India; Expressways; National; State; Asian; State Highways in Kerala

Thiruvananthapuram–Angamaly Greenfield Highway is a 257-kilometre-long (160 mi) planned greenfield access-controlled highway in Kerala, India. The proposed greenfield highway running parallel to the Main Central Road is to ensure better connectivity between Thiruvananthapuram and Angamaly through several regions of Kottayam and Kottarakkara.

== Route description ==
The total length of the highway is 257 kilometres (160 mi) long and passes through 13 taluks of six districts in Kerala. The highway would be constructed with a width of 45 metres (148 ft). It would run parallel to the Main Central Road and begins from Pulimath in Thiruvananthapuram. It would go through Pulimath, Kallara, Kadakkal, Anchal , Pathanapuram, Konni, Kumplampoika, Kanjirapalli, Thitanad, Pravithanam, Thodupuzha, Kothamangalam, and Malayattoor, finally ending at Angamaly.

== History ==
Considering the development of pilgrimage and tourism sectors, it was decided to develop a new national highway, parallel to the Main Central Road (MC Road). The original plan was to expand the existing two lane MC Road into a four lane. However a situation arose where many towns have to be demolished for the development of MC Road. This also required to pay huge compensation for the buildings and land acquired from the people. Hence the government changed the plan and decided to construct a new 6 lane highway parallel to the MC Road. Earlier it was decided to start the highway from Aruvikkkara. Later, the National Highways Authority decided to change the plan. The highway would connect with the proposed Vizhinjam–Navaikulam outer ring road. As of now the project has been cancelled.

== See also ==
- Thiruvananthapuram–Kasaragod Coastal Highway
- Main Central Road
- Palakkad–Kozhikode Greenfield Highway
