= State Highway 15 (Kerala) =

Highway in Kerala, India

State Highway 15
- Ettumanoor - Ernakulam Road
- SH 15 highlighted in red

Route information
- Maintained by Kerala Public Works Department
- Length: 57.3 km (35.6 mi)

Major junctions
- South end: SH 1 in Ettumanur
- SH 42 in Kuruppanthara; SH 40 in Thalayolaparambu; NH 85 in Thrippunithura
- North end: NH 66 in Vyttila

Location
- Country: India
- State: Kerala
- Districts: Kottayam, Ernakulam

Highway system
- Roads in India; Expressways; National; State; Asian; State Highways in Kerala
| ← SH 14 | → SH 16 |

State Highway 15 (SH 15) is a state highway in Kerala that starts from Ettumanoor and ends at Pulikkal junction. The highway is 57.3 km long.

== Route description ==
Ettumanoor (MC Road SH 01) - Kothanalloor - Kuruppumthara - Thalayolaparambu- Vaikom- Udayamperoor - Thripunithura - Vyttila - Pulikkal junction (joins with NH 47)

== See also ==
- Roads in Kerala
- List of state highways in Kerala
