= State Highway 60 (Kerala) =

Highway in Kerala, India

State Highway 60
- Angadipuram - Cherukara Road Map
- SH 60 highlighted in red

Route information
- Maintained by Kerala Public Works Department
- Length: 7.61 km (4.73 mi)

Major junctions
- North end: NH 966 in Angadippuram
- South end: SH 39 in Cherukara

Location
- Country: India
- State: Kerala
- Districts: Malappuram

Highway system
- Roads in India; Expressways; National; State; Asian; State Highways in Kerala
← SH 59	→ SH 61

State Highway 60 (SH 60) is a state highway in Kerala, India that starts in Angadipuram and ends in Cherukara. The highway is 7.61 km long.

== Route map ==
Angadipuram – Pariyapuram – Cherukara

== See also ==
- Roads in Kerala
- List of state highways in Kerala
