= State Highway 51 (Kerala) =

Road in Kerala, India

State Highway 51
- Kodakara – Kodungallur Road
- SH 51 highlighted in red

Route information
- Maintained by Kerala Public Works Department
- Length: 27 km (17 mi)

Major junctions
- East end: NH 544 in Kodakara
- SH 61 in Aloor
- West end: NH 66 in Kodungallur

Location
- Country: India
- State: Kerala
- Districts: Thrissur

Highway system
- Roads in India; Expressways; National; State; Asian; State Highways in Kerala
← SH 50	→ SH 52

State Highway 51 (SH 51) is a State Highway in Kerala, India that starts in Kodakara on NH 544 and ends in Kodungallur on NH 66. The highway is 27 km long.

== Route map ==
Kodakara (NH 544)- Manakulagara - Koprakkalam - Pulipparakkunnu - Aloor- Kombodinjamakkal - Ashtamichira- Vadama - Mala- Poyya- Krishnan kotta- Keezhthali (joins NH 66)- Kodungallur

== See also ==
- Roads in Kerala
- List of state highways in Kerala
