= Jyothi Nagar =

Jyothi Nagar may refer to:

- Jyothi Nagar, an area of Mysuru in Karnataka, India
- Jyothi Nagar, a residential area of Chennai
- Jothi Nagar, a residential community in Kesavadasapuram, Thiruvananthapuram, Kerala, India
- West Jyoti Nagar, a residential area of Shahdara district, Delhi, India
