= State Highway 45 (Kerala) =

Highway in Kerala, India

State Highway 45
- Thiruvananthapuram - Ponmudi Highway
- SH 45 highlighted in red

Route information
- Maintained by Kerala Public Works Department
- Length: 61 km (38 mi)

Major junctions
- West end: Thiruvananthapuram
- NH 66 in Thiruvananthapuram City; SH 3 in Nedumangad Town; SH 47 in Pazhakutty Junction; SH 2 in Chullimanoor Junction; SH 59 in Vithura Town
- East end: Ponmudi

Location
- Country: India
- State: Kerala
- Districts: Thiruvananthapuram

Highway system
- Roads in India; Expressways; National; State; Asian; State Highways in Kerala
← SH 44	→ SH 46

State Highway 45 (SH 45) is a state highway in Kerala, India that starts from Capital city of Thiruvananthapuram and ends in Vithura - Ponmudi. The highway is 61 km long. This road passes through Vithura Town. [1]

== Prime intersections ==
Thiruvananthapuram - Peroorkada - Nedumangad - Chullimanoor (Along SH2) - Tholicode - Vithura Town - Kallar - Ponmudi Upper Sanitorium

== See also ==
- Roads in Kerala
- List of state highways in Kerala
