= State Highway 49 (Kerala) =

Road in Kerala, India

State Highway 49
- Guruvayoor – Choondal Road
- SH 49 highlighted in red

Route information
- Maintained by Kerala Public Works Department
- Length: 7.275 km (4.520 mi)

Major junctions
- West end: SH 62 in Guruvayoor
- East end: SH 69 in Choondal

Location
- Country: India
- State: Kerala
- Districts: Thrissur

Highway system
- Roads in India; Expressways; National; State; Asian; State Highways in Kerala
← SH 48	→ SH 50

State Highway 49 (SH 49) is a State Highway in Kerala, India that starts in Guruvayoor and ends in Choondal. The highway is 7.275 km long. It is one of the shortest state highways in Kerala. It is one of the three ways which connect Guruvayoor with Thrissur city.

== Route map ==
Guruvayoor – Chowallurpady - Choondal

== See also ==
- Roads in Kerala
- List of state highways in Kerala
