= State Highway 64 (Kerala) =

Highway in Kerala, India

State Highway 64
- Varkala - Parippally - Madathara Road
- SH 64 highlighted in red

Route information
- Maintained by Kerala Public Works Department
- Length: 44.69 km (27.77 mi)

Major junctions
- West end: in Varkala
- NH 66 in Parippally; SH 1 in Nilamel
- East end: SH 2 in Madathara

Location
- Country: India
- State: Kerala
- Districts: Thiruvananthapuram, Kollam

Highway system
- Roads in India; Expressways; National; State; Asian; State Highways in Kerala
← SH 63	→ SH 65

State Highway 64 (SH 64) is a state highway in Kerala, India that starts in Varkala Varkala municipality in Thiruvananthapuram district and ends in Madathara of Kollam. The highway is 45 km long.

== Route map ==
Varkala - Kannamba - Nadayara - Palayamkunnu - Chavarcode - Parippally (Cross- NH 66) -Pallickal-Nilamel (cross (SH 1) MC Road)- Kadakkal - Chithara - Madathara (Joined SH 02). The main disadvantage is vehicle has to cross a railway gate in Varkala near to Railway Station. Govt. is proposed a railway over bridge to cross this hurdle. But the construction is not yet started.

== See also ==
- Roads in Kerala
- List of state highways in Kerala
