= State Highway 46 (Kerala) =

Highway in Kerala, India

State Highway 46
- Kilimanoor-Alamcode (Attingal) road
- SH 46 highlighted in red

Route information
- Maintained by Kerala Public Works Department
- Length: 10.7 km (6.6 mi)

Major junctions
- East end: SH 1 in Kilimanoor
- West end: NH 66 in Alamcode

Location
- Country: India
- State: Kerala
- Districts: Thiruvananthapuram

Highway system
- Roads in India; Expressways; National; State; Asian; State Highways in Kerala
← SH 45	→ SH 47

State Highway 46 (SH 46) is a state highway in Kerala, India that starts in Kilimanoor and ends in Alamcode, a junction in Attingal municipal area. The highway is 10.7 km long.

== Route map ==
Kilimanoor central junction.(SH 1 - MC Road) - Nagaroor - Vanchiyoor - Alamcode junction (joins with NH 66-Attingal)

== See also ==
- Roads in Kerala
- List of state highways in Kerala
