= State Highway 63 (Kerala) =

Road in Kerala, India

State Highway 63
- Vypeen Pallippuram Road
- SH 63 highlighted in red

Route information
- Maintained by Kerala Public Works Department
- Length: 25.5 km (15.8 mi)

Major junctions
- South end: Vypin: NH 966A in Goshree
- North end: Munambam

Location
- Country: India
- State: Kerala
- Districts: Ernakulam

Highway system
- Roads in India; Expressways; National; State; Asian; State Highways in Kerala
← SH 62	→ SH 64

State Highway 63 (SH 63) is a state highway in Kerala, India that starts in Vypin and ends in Munambam. The highway is 25.5 km long.

== Route map ==
Vypin – Puthuvype – Njarakkal – Cherai – Pallippuram - Munambam

== See also ==
- Roads in Kerala
- List of state highways in Kerala
