= NSS Academy of Civil Services =

Civil service academy in Kesavadasapuram, Kerala, India

NSS Academy of Civil Services (also known as NACS) is a civil service academy in Kesavadasapuram, Kerala, India established in July 2012 by Nair Service Society. NACS provide training and infrastructure facilities to the civil service students.

NSS appointed former Indian diplomat and vice-chairman of the Kerala State Higher Education Council, T. P. Sreenivasan as the director and advisor of NACS.

== History ==
NACS was first announced by NSS General Secretary G Sukumaran Nair during the Mannam jayanti celebrations in January 2012.

== Achievements ==
In the 2015 Civil Services Examination (CSE), fifteen of NACS students got selected for the civil services.
