= State Highway 62 (Kerala) =

Road in Kerala, India

State Highway 62
- Guruvayoor – Althara – Ponnani road
- SH 62 highlighted in red

Route information
- Maintained by Kerala Public Works Department
- Length: 28.97 km (18.00 mi)

Major junctions
- South end: SH 49 in Guruvayur
- SH 50 in Mammiyoor
- North end: NH 66 in Ponnani

Location
- Country: India
- State: Kerala
- Districts: Thrissur, Malappuram

Highway system
- Roads in India; Expressways; National; State; Asian; State Highways in Kerala
← SH 61	→ SH 63

State Highway 62 (SH 62) is a State Highway in Kerala, India that starts in Guruvayoor and ends in Kundukadavu. The highway is 28.97 km (18 mi) long.

== Route map ==
Guruvayoor – Althara – Perumpadappu – Maranchery – Kanjiramukku – Kundukadavu (joins Palakkad – Ponnani road)

== See also ==
- Roads in Kerala
- List of state highways in Kerala
