= State Highway 47 (Kerala) =

Highway in Kerala, India

State Highway 47
- Attingal – Nedumangad Road
- SH 47 highlighted in red

Route information
- Maintained by Kerala Public Works Department
- Length: 27 km (17 mi)
- Component highways: SH 1 from Venjaramoodu to Vembayam

Major junctions
- West end: NH 66 in Attingal
- SH 1 in Venjaramoodu
- East end: SH 2 in Nedumangad

Location
- Country: India
- State: Kerala
- Districts: Thiruvananthapuram

Highway system
- Roads in India; Expressways; National; State; Asian; State Highways in Kerala
← SH 46	→ SH 48

State Highway 47 (SH 47) is a State Highway in Kerala, India that starts in Attingal and ends in Nedumangadu. The highway is 18.5 km long. It is a major highway in thiruvananthapuram district that interconnect two important towns Attingal and Nedumangad, And also the Road is the only way to connect the SH 1 |Main-Central Road and National Highway 66 from the north - eastern hilly areas of Nedumangad.

== Route map ==
Attingal (starts from km of NH 66) - Valakkad - Venjaramoodu (joins SH 1 - MC road ) - Vembayam - Pazhakutty junction ( joints with SH 02 ) Nedumangadu

== See also ==
- Roads in Kerala
- List of state highways in Kerala
