= Puthuvely =

- village
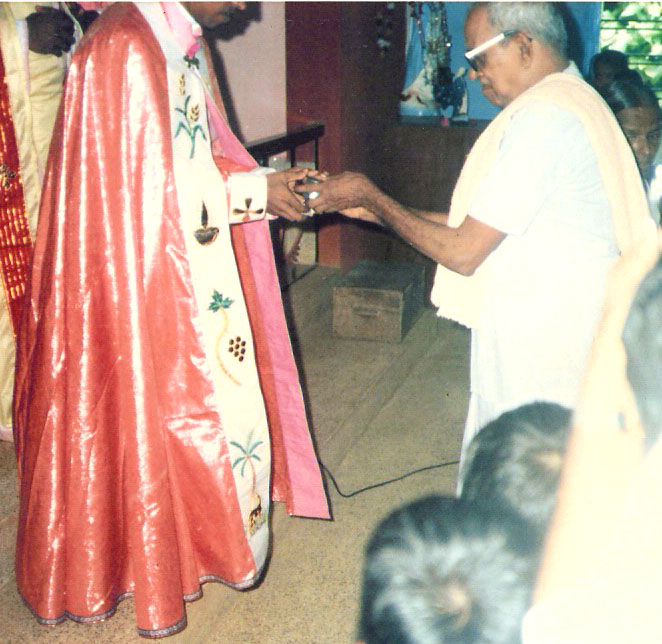
- Inside the Puthuvely Church
- Interactive map of Puthuvely
- Coordinates: 9°49′0″N 76°35′0″E
- Country: India
- State: Kerala
- District: Kottayam

Languages
  - Official: Malayalam, English
- Time zone: UTC+5:30 (IST)
- PIN: 686636
- Vehicle registration: KL-67
- Nearest city: Koothattukulam
- Lok Sabha constituency: Kottayam

Puthuvely is a small village in Kottayam district of Kerala state, South India. It is a border village of Kottayam district.

== Economy ==
The village's economy depends mainly on crop plantations like rubber, cocoa, pepper, ginger and foreign income from workers abroad. The main source of the village's income is from agriculture.

People from a variety of different ethnicities and religions live here including Hindus, Knanaya Catholics of the Kottayam Diocese, Orthodox Christians and Jacobites. The majority of the village consists of a single large family and its several branches.

== Location ==
Puthuvely is situated on the MC road, 4 km south of Koothattukulam and 3 km north of Monippally. There are roads to Areekara, Veliyannoor, Uzhavoor, Elangi from here.

== Schools ==
It has a Government Higher Secondary School named [GOVT HSS PUTHUVELY ] and a Primary School and a college named Mar Kuriakose Arts and Science College (Affiliated to Mahatma Gandhi University Kottayam ) run by Divine Educational & Charitable Trust Puthuvely.
