= State Highway 52 (Kerala) =

Highway in Kerala, India

State Highway 52
- Palakkad - Pollachi road
- SH 52 highlighted in red

Route information
- Maintained by Kerala Public Works Department
- Length: 29.9 km (18.6 mi)

Major junctions
- East end: NH 544 in Palakkad
- SH 26 in Athicode
- West end: TN border in Gopalapuram

Location
- Country: India
- State: Kerala
- Districts: Palakkad

Highway system
- Roads in India; Expressways; National; State; Asian; State Highways in Kerala
| ← SH 51 | → SH 53 |

State Highway 52 (SH 52) is a state highway in Kerala, India that starts in Palakkad and ends in Gopalapuram. The highway is 29.9 km long.

== Route map ==
Palakkad (NH 47) - Athicode junction (SH 26 crosses) - Gopalapuram (Gopalapuram - road continues to Pollachi in Tamil Nadu)

== See also ==
- Roads in Kerala
- List of state highways in Kerala
