= State Highway 61 (Kerala) =

Road in Kerala, India

State Highway 61
- Potta – Moonupeedika Road
- SH 61 highlighted in red

Route information
- Maintained by Kerala Public Works Department
- Length: 27.665 km (17.190 mi)

Major junctions
- West end: NH 544 in Potta
- SH 51 in Aloor; SH 22 in Irinjalakkuda
- East end: NH 66 in Moonupeedika

Location
- Country: India
- State: Kerala
- Districts: Thrissur

Highway system
- Roads in India; Expressways; National; State; Asian; State Highways in Kerala
← SH 60	→ SH 62

State Highway 61 (SH 61) is a State Highway in Kerala, India that starts in Potta and ends in Moonupeedika. This highway is 21 km long. It connects National Highway 66 to National Highway 544 which are two main national highways in Kerala. Irinjalakuda town is situated on this road which is the headquarters of Irinjalakuda Revenue Division and Mukundapuram Taluk. Irinjalakuda railway station is also located along this road

This road is primarily used by commuters traveling from the coastal belt (Kodungallur/Moonupeedika side) to the interior parts of Thrissur or toward Kochi/Palakkad via the National Highway.

== Route ==
Potta – Aloor - Kallettumkara- Vallakkunnu-Pullur- Irinjalakuda – Edathirinji - Moonupeedika

== See also ==
- Roads in Kerala
- List of state highways in Kerala

Geographic data related to State Highway 61 (Kerala) at OpenStreetMap
