= State Highway 50 (Kerala) =

Road in Kerala, India

State Highway 50
- Chavakkad – Vadakkancherry Road
- SH 50 highlighted in red

Route information
- Maintained by Kerala Public Works Department
- Length: 31.515 km (19.583 mi)

Major junctions
- West end: NH 66 in Chavakkad
- SH 62 near Guruvayur; SH 69 in Kunnamkulam
- East end: SH 22 in Wadakkancherry

Location
- Country: India
- State: Kerala
- Districts: Thrissur

Highway system
- Roads in India; Expressways; National; State; Asian; State Highways in Kerala
← SH 49	→ SH 51

State Highway 50 (SH 50) is a State Highway in Kerala, India that starts in Chavakkad and ends in Wadakkancherry. The highway is 31.515 km long.

This highway is a two lane highway. It ends at Wadakkanchery junction and combines with SH 22 Shornur-Kodungallor route. Many people travel through this route, mainly to visit Guruvayoor temple. It ends at NH 66.

== Route ==
Chavakkad-Mammiyoor-Kottapadi-Kunnamkulam-Marathamcode-Pannithadam-Vellarakad-Erumapetty-Wadakanchery

== See also ==
- Roads in Kerala
- List of state highways in Kerala
