= Achickal =

- village
- Location in Kerala, India Achickal (India)
- Coordinates: 9°49′N 76°34′E
- Country: India
- State: Kerala
- District: Kottayam

Languages
  - Official: Malayalam, English
- Time zone: UTC+5:30 (IST)
- PIN: 6886636 (monippally)
- Telephone code: 04822
- Vehicle registration: KL-67(Uzahvoor)
- Nearest city: Kottayam
- Lok Sabha constituency: Kaduthuruthy

Achickal is a small village in Kottayam district of Kerala, south India.

== Economy ==
The village's economy depends mainly on crop plantations like rubber, cocoa, pepper and ginger. Points of interest include St. Joseph Church Udayagiri, Ilamthuruthy Rock, Little Flower School, Little Flower Convent, and Holy Family Convent.

== Access ==
The road passing through here is the State Highway 1 ( Thiruvananthapuram to Angamaly). To reach Achickal from Ernakulam, one must catch a bus to Palai and get off at Monippally. From Monippally one can reach Achickal by hiring a vehicle, or by KSRTC ordinary and fast passenger bus.
