= Mannoor, Kollam =

Mannoor
- Village
- Location in Kerala, India Mannoor (India)
- Coordinates: 08°52′24″N 76°56′38.6″E
- Country: India
- State: Kerala
- District: Kollam

Government
  - Type: Local self-government
  - Body: Panchayat

Area
  - Total: 10.5 km^{2} (4.1 sq mi)
- Elevation: 45 m (148 ft)

Languages
  - Official: Malayalam Other Languages=English
- Time zone: UTC+5:30 (IST)
- PIN: 691311
- Telephone code: 0475
- Vehicle registration: KL-25, KL-24, KL-02
- District: Kollam
- Civic agency: Panchayat
- Climate: Monsoon (Köppen)
- Literacy Rate: 95%

Mannoor is a village in Ittiva Grama Panchayath located towards the west of Kollam district of Kerala, India. It is located on the west of the Main Central Road. The closest towns are Anchal and Punalur. The village is also close to Kadakkal, an agricultural village known for its spice production and the Kadakkal Devi Temple. Thiruvananthapuram, formerly Trivandrum, is 65 kilometres (40 mi) from Mannoor and is the closest airport. Kollam, formerly Quilon, the district headquarters, is 46 kilometres (29 mi) away.

== History ==
The original inhabitants of the village were indigenous people belonging to the Vedan and other scheduled tribes. They were displaced to the nearby fringes of forests as new immigrants started settling in the village.

=== Early inhabitants ===
By late 19th century, the "Mannoor" family of Nairs migrated from the northern areas of Travancore along with a few Syrian Christian families that arrived in Mannoor from the northern parts of Travancore. It was a time of large scale migration of Syrian Christians of Travancore and the Kingdom of Cochin. Some of the first Syrian Christian families who came to Mannoor were Thulayil, Keezhathil, Cherukkattu, Thadathil, Valiya karikkathil, Vazhangottu, Mampuzhayil, Perumkulathil, Kizhakkevilayil, Idayilaveettil and Keezhoottu. Their arrival in Mannoor almost coincided with the Malabar Migration which saw large-scale migration of Syrian Christians to North Malabar.

== Geography ==
Mannoor is a hilly terrain lying on the far-end of the foothills of the Western Ghats. The village has a rich biodiversity. Crows, pigeons, cranes, lapwings and common myna are some of the common birds seen in the area. Peacocks and foxes rarely stray away from forest to the village.

=== Agriculture ===
Cashew was once the largest cash crops in the village, and there were several small-stretch plantations. All these plantations were gradually replaced by rubber plantations after the 1960s. Rubber is today the most widely prevalent cash crop in Mannoor, which has led to decrease in the area under cultivation of essential food crops.

Pezhu, vatta, mango and jackfruit are some of the naturally grown flora in the area. Agricultural crops include rice, coconut and arecanut. Villages cultivate a variety of plants such as tapioca, elephant yam, colocasia and Guyana arrowroot, though the area under cultivation has drastically decreased.

Plantain is one of the most cultivated crops in the region and there are a number of varieties. Black pepper is also grown.

== Environment ==
A tributary of Ithikkara River flows through Mannoor, dividing the village into two.

Mannoor has a number of paddy fields. They are:

- Cherukkattu Mele (Near Unnikkunnumpuram)
- Vellaramkunnu - Meenkulam
- Puthar
- Mannoor Veedu - Keezhathil Veedu Stretch
- Perumkulath Ela
- Vazhangottu Ela
- Kovoor

Rice cultivation was once the mainstay of the economy of Mannoor along with coconut and Areca nut. The paddy fields and streams running beside them are a pivotal element of the ecology of the village.

== Politics ==
The village is traditionally a stronghold of the Congress Party. The Party gained strength in the village in the wake of the struggle for independence from British colonial rule in India. The villagers at large, however, did not take active part in the independence struggle and still keep aloof from the people's struggles that take place elsewhere in the state reflecting very low political consciousness.

It was only in the 1990s that the Communist Parties could gain support in Mannoor. For the past 25 years or so, the Communist Party of India has made some inroads into Mannoor. The Communist Party of India (Marxist) also has nominal presence in the village today. Congress (I) is another political party with active presence in Mannoor. Other major political parties are also virtually absent.

Despite the presence of secular political parties, the public life of the village has resisted secularisation. Public life still revolves around places of worship in the predominantly Christian village.

== Institutions ==
Mannoor has several institutions serving the public. LMS Lower Primary School, founded by the London Missionary Society, is one of the oldest institutions in the village. There is a Taluk Co-operative Hospital in Mannoor but it is struggling for survival as villagers prefer to go to hospitals in Anchal, a nearby town, for medical treatment. Integrated Cattle Development Project (ICDP) of the State government has a unit in Mannoor, catering to the needs of veterinary medicine for livestock.

A Government Ayurvedha Dispansary is in Mannoor. It is very useful for village people. The Land of the Dispansary is donated by Shri Kunjukunju (Perumkulathu Family)

Co-operative Milk Society and Sahrudaya Arts and Sports Club are the other institutions in the village. A post office was established in 1980s before which neighbouring Vayala used to serve Mannoor.

There was a small-scale khadi spinning unit but it became defunct long ago.

== Religion ==
Christianity and Hinduism are the most prevalent religions in the village. The new Syrian Christian settlers in late 19th century mostly belonged to the Oriental Orthodox faith. They established the St. Mary's Orthodox Church, also known as Cherukkattu Palli, on a land donated by the Keezhathil family. A few prominent families including Cherukkattu Veedu, Thadathil (Panayil Puthen Veedu) and Idayila Veedu also contributed in building the Church.

When the Orthodox Church underwent a split in 1912, the congregation sided with the Indian Orthodox Church. The other faction, Jacobite Syrian Church has no representation in the entire vicinity till today.

The next denominations to start places of worship were Mar Thoma Church and Brethren. Then came the Malankara Catholic Church and Ceylon Pentecostal Mission. The Pentecostal faith was introduced to the village by two women.

The second church to come up in Mannoor was Salem Marthoma Church and the Brethren Church which was established in Keezhathil household by two men of other families as a result of evangelism by John Vilangara. The present St. George Malankara Catholic Church was established soon after. The Young Men's Christian Association (YMCA) has its presence in Mannoor.

The major Hindu temples of worship are located around Mannoor. Athyshyamangalam Devi Temple and Kuthirapanthi Devi Temple are few of the more prominent of them.

== Arts and science ==
Mannoor is one of the very few villages in Kerala where people's science movements such as Kerala Sasthra Sahithya Parishad are conspicuous by its total absence. There is no organization or activity aimed at promoting scientific temper in society in Mannoor.

Activities in the fields of liberal arts and literature are also on the ebb in the otherwise economically advanced village.

== Climate ==
Mannoor experiences a tropical climate with little seasonal variation in temperatures. December–March is the dry season with less than 65mm of rain in each of those months. April–November is the wet season, with considerably more rain than during December–March.

Climate data for Mannoor, Kerala
| Month | Jan | Feb | Mar | Apr | May | Jun | Jul | Aug | Sep | Oct | Nov | Dec | Year |
|---|---|---|---|---|---|---|---|---|---|---|---|---|---|
| Mean daily maximum °C (°F) | 30.0 (86.0) | 31.0 (87.8) | 32.1 (89.8) | 32.3 (90.1) | 31.9 (89.4) | 29.7 (85.5) | 29.2 (84.6) | 29.5 (85.1) | 29.9 (85.8) | 29.8 (85.6) | 29.3 (84.7) | 29.4 (84.9) | 30.3 (86.6) |
| Mean daily minimum °C (°F) | 22.3 (72.1) | 23.0 (73.4) | 24.4 (75.9) | 25.3 (77.5) | 25.3 (77.5) | 24.0 (75.2) | 23.5 (74.3) | 23.6 (74.5) | 23.7 (74.7) | 23.8 (74.8) | 23.3 (73.9) | 22.5 (72.5) | 23.7 (74.7) |
| Average precipitation mm (inches) | 19 (0.7) | 33 (1.3) | 64 (2.5) | 156 (6.1) | 230 (9.1) | 409 (16.1) | 340 (13.4) | 225 (8.9) | 199 (7.8) | 294 (11.6) | 212 (8.3) | 58 (2.3) | 2,239 (88.1) |
Source: Climate-Data.org
