= Mattoor =

- town
- Location in Kerala, India
- Coordinates: 10°10′10″N 76°25′45″E
- Country: India
- State: Kerala
- District: Ernakulam

Population (2011)
  - Total: 18,890

Languages
  - Official: Malayalam, English
- Time zone: UTC+5:30 (IST)
- PIN: 683574
- Nearest city: Cochin
- Literacy: 100%

Mattoor is a small town in the Ernakulam district in the Indian state of Kerala. It is situated 2 km (1.2 mi) north of Kalady on MC Road. From here, Cochin International Airport is 5 km (3.1 mi).

== Demographics ==
As of 2011, Mattoor had a population of 18,890 with 9,322 males and 9,568 females.
