= State Highway 16 (Kerala) =

Highway in Kerala, India

State Highway 16
- Aluva - Munnar Highway
- SH 16 highlighted in red

Route information
- Maintained by Kerala Public Works Department
- Length: 114.4 km (71.1 mi)
- Component highways: NH 85 from Kothamangalam to Munnar

Major junctions
- West end: Aluva
- SH 1 in Perumbavoor; NH 85 in Kothamangalam
- East end: SH 17 in Munnar

Location
- Country: India
- State: Kerala
- Districts: Ernakulam, Idukki

Highway system
- Roads in India; Expressways; National; State; Asian; State Highways in Kerala
| ← SH 15 | → SH 17 |

State Highway 16 (SH 16) is also known as Aluva - Munnar Road is a state highway in Kerala that starts from Aluva and ends at Northern outlet road in Munnar. The highway is 57.3 km long.

== Route map ==
Aluva - Ponjasseri - Kizhakkambalam road starts - Mannoor - Ponjasseri road ends - Perumbavoor - MC Road crosses - Koovapady - (Kuruppumpady - Kootickal) Road Crosses - (Paneli - Muvattupuzha) road crosses - Kothamangalam - Neriamangalam junction - Cheeyappara waterfalls - Deviyar bridge - Adimali junction (Adimali - Chithirapuram road starts) - Kallar river - Pallivasal - Munnar town - Northern outlet road starts

== See also ==
- List of state highways in Kerala
