= B. Kemal Pasha =

Indian judge

Hon'ble Justice B. Kemal Pasha

Judge of High Court of Kerala
- In office 30 June 2014 – 24 May 2018

Personal details
- Born: 25 May 1956 (age 70) Anchal, Kollam, State of Travancore–Cochin (present day Kerala), India
- Education: Master of Laws
- Alma mater: St John's College, Anchal; Government Law College, Thiruvananthapuram; Mahatma Gandhi University, Kerala
- Website: High Court of Kerala

B. Kemal Pasha (born 25 May 1956) is a retired judge of the High Court of Kerala in India.

== Early life ==
Kemal Pasha was born in Anchal Village, Kollam District, on 25 May 1956. He completed his primary education from Government U.P School Vadamon, high schooling from Government High School Anchal, graduation from St John's College, Anchal, LL.B from Government Law College, Thiruvananthapuram and Master of Laws from Mahatma Gandhi University, Kerala.

== Career ==
He enrolled as an advocate on 16 December 1979 and started practice in the same year at Kollam with Adv. P. Vijayaraghavan. He was appointed as Second Additional District and Sessions Judge, Ernakulam in 1995 thereafter he served as District and Sessions Judge Thiruvananthapuram, Additional District and Sessions Judge, Kozhikode, Special judge (SPE/CBI) at Ernakulam, Additional District and Sessions Judge, Kottayam, Principal District and Sessions Judge, Thrissur, Principal District and Sessions Judge and STAT, Ernakulam and Registrar General of High Court of Kerala. While serving the post of Registrar General of High Court of Kerala, he was appointed as Additional Judge of the High Court of Kerala on 28 January 2013 and became a Permanent Judge of the High Court of Kerala from 30-06-2014 and he is one of the Board of Governors of Kerala Judicial Academy. Justice Pasha demitted his office upon attaining age of superannuation on 24 May 2018.
