= Palakkad–Kozhikode Greenfield Highway =

Proposed greenfield highway in Kerala, India

Route information
- Maintained by National Highways Authority of India
- Length: 121 km (75 mi)

Major junctions
- South East end: Marutharode, Palakkad
- North West end: Pantheeramkavu, Kozhikode

Location
- Country: India
- State: Kerala
- Districts: Malappuram, Kozhikode, Palakkad

Highway system
- Roads in India; Expressways; National; State; Asian; State Highways in Kerala

Palakkad–Kozhikode Greenfield Highway is a 121-kilometre-long planned greenfield access-controlled highway in Kerala, India. The highway, which is proposed under the Bharatmala project, is expected to reduce the travel time between Palakkad and Kozhikode to two hours and decongest traffic on the existing NH 966. It also interconnects the national highways 544 and 66.

== Overview ==
During peak traffic, it takes approximately four hours to travel from Kozhikode to Palakkad through the present NH 966 route. However, the proposed 121-kilometer-long highway, which connects national highways 544 and 66, is intended to reduce travel time to two hours. The congestion on NH 966 is also expected to be reduced. The highway would be constructed on four or six-lane, and starts from Marutharode village in Palakkad in the NH 544 to Pantheeramkavu in Kozhikode in the NH 66.

In 2018, the Central Government first designed the alignment of the project. It is expected to cost ₹8,000 crore. Of this, Rs 4,000 crore is for construction and the remaining 4000 crores is for acquiring 547 hectares of land with a width of 45 meters including the service road. The project will have a little impact on forests and human settlements, according to a pre-feasibility report for environmental impact assessment. There is no tunnel or forest along the alignment. The highway will accommodate traffic between Kozhikode and the Calicut airport in Kondotty, Malappuram and is expected to enable high-speed access to the ports of Kozhikode and Chennai. It is also expected to increase connectivity to the 39 villages along the alignment and to tourist sites such as Wayanad, Mysuru, Silent Valley, Nilambur and Ooty.

== See also ==
- Thiruvananthapuram–Angamaly Greenfield Highway
- National Highway 966 (India)
