= Muslim Association College of Engineering =

Coordinates: 8°41′50.2296″N 76°54′54.0714″E

Muslim Association College of Engineering & Polytechnic, Thiruvananthapuram
- Established: 2002
- Affiliations: Kerala Technological University
- Location: Thiruvananthapuram, Kerala, India
- AICTE Status: Approved [File# South-Western Region/1-2179361/2010/EOA]
- Website: www.mace.edu.in

Muslim Association College of Engineering & Polytechnic (MACE) is an Engineering College in Venjaramoodu, Thiruvananthapuram, Kerala. Its approved by AICTE and affiliated to Kerala Technological University and DTE. It was established in the year 2002 and is a Muslim Minority Institution run by Muslim Association, Thiruvananthapuram. The Association, which is registered under Travancore Cochin Literary and Scientific Societies Act, was formed in the year 1966, with the objective of imparting quality education and other services to the society, by a band of enlightened person belonging to the Islamic community in the capital city of Kerala.

Muslim association, over the years has grown in to one of the premier cultural organization in the state, whose contributions to the cause of education have been widely acknowledged. The main asset of the association has always been fast-growing fraternity of members, who occupy prominent position in profession of education, civil service, and business, social and cultural fields. Their selfless service and dedicated efforts have carried this organization to an envious realm of achievement.

== Location ==
Muslim Association College of Engineering and Polytechnic (MACEP) is situated in Venjaramoodu (Thiruvananthapuram-Kottarakkara route), about 30 km from South of Thiruvananthapuram.

== Courses ==
UG (B.Tech) courses:

- Civil Engineering (60 seats per year)
- Computer Science & Engineering (60 seats per year)
- Electronics and Communication Engineering (30 seats per year)
- Electrical and Electronics Engineering (30 seats per year)
- Mechanical Engineering (60 seats per year)
- UG (Diploma) courses:
  - Civil Engineering (60 seats per year)
  - Computer Engineering (60 seats per year)
  - Mechanical Engineering (60 seats per year)

=== Impulse ===
Impulse is a National Level Inter College technical and cultural festival conducted by Muslim Association College of Engineering Venjaramoodu. Impulse is the annual technical and cultural festival of MACE. It was started in 2008 but took off rapidly and became one of the major college fests in kerala. It is a three-day event held annually and almost all colleges in the state participate in this event. Technical festivals include research paper presentations, business quizzes, robotics competitions etc.. The pro shows organised as part of Impulse attracts students as well as others in large numbers. The pro shows mark the culmination of the 3 day festival which is a heartthrob among the younger generations of the state. Three days of performance with over a wide genre of dance, music, drama at its disposal promises to enthrall the audience.

The technical fest SHASTRA V2.0 was held on March 3, 2022, which started the beginning of cultural fest.The 14th edition of Impulse was held at college on June 5, 2022, and the cultural extravaganza was witnessed by a huge crowd.A flash mob was organized by the college dance team at LuLu Mall which a centre of attraction and marked the beginning for fest.
