= National Highway 183A (India) =

National highway in India

National Highway 183A
- Map of National Highway 183A in red

Route information
- Maintained by Government of India
- Length: 240.6 km (149.5 mi)

Major junctions
- From: Titanium Junction Chavara (Kollam)
- SH 1, Adoor; SH 5, Adoor; SH 78, Kaipattoor; SH 7, Pathanamthitta; SH 8, Mylapra, Pathanamthitta; SH 67, Manarakulanji; NH 183, Vandiperiyar
- To: Vandiperiyar

Location
- Country: India
- State: Kerala
- Districts: Pathanamthitta, Idukki
- Primary destinations: Sasthamkotta, Adoor, Thattayil, Kaipattoor, Pathanamthitta, Vadasserikkera, Plapally, Gavi, Vandiperiyar , Chengannur

Highway system
- Roads in India; Expressways; National; State; Asian; State Highways in Kerala
← NH 183	→ NH 185

National Highway 183A, also known as NH 183A, is a National Highway in the Indian state of Kerala that runs from Chavara Titanium Junction, Kollam, to Vandiperiyar via Adoor and Pathanamthitta. It is the 4th National Highway passing through the Kollam district.

== Elevation to National Highway ==
The road was declared a National Highway (NH) on 4 March 2014. It conforms to NH standards for a two-lane traffic highway from Adoor to Plapally. The section past Plapally is only 4 meters wide and passes through forest and wildlife areas. The Forest Department raised concerns over the road's alignment. Once upgraded, a new connection from Vandiperiyar to Sabarimala is planned. Currently the stretch between Angamoozhy Forest Checkpost and Vallakadavu Forest Checkpost is entry restricted and the forest department allows only 30 private vehicles per day on the route and vehicles entering through Kochandi Check post has to leave only through Vallakkadavu Check post before 6 pm.

== Major cities and linking towns ==
- Titanium Junction
- Sasthamkotta
  - Sasthamkotta (Central Junction)
  - Bharanikkavu
- Kadampanad
- Adoor
  - Nellimootil Padi Bridge Junction (NH 183A starts from MC Road) Adoor Bypass also starts here
  - Adoor Central (junction with KP Road)
  - Anandapaly (Thumpamon Road starts, a church is situated here)
- Thattayil
  - Mankuzhi Keerukuzhy — Bhagavathikkum Padinjaru — Thumpamon road starts here
  - Tholuzham a small junction in Thattayil, the famous Orippurathu bhagavathi temple is situated near this junction
- Kaipattoor
  - Kaipattoor Thekke Kurishu: Ezhamkulam Road starts via Chandanapally, Kodumon
  - Kaipattoor Kadav Jn (Konni Road starts via Vallikkode)
  - Kaipattoor Central Jn. (Pandalam Road starts via Thumpamon)
- Omalloor
  - Omalloor bypass
- Pathanamthitta
  - PTA Stadium Jn.: Ring road crosses
  - Pathanamthitta – Intersects with Ring Road, TK Road
  - Mylapra – Crosses Punaloor Moovattupuzha Main Eastern Hwy
  - Mannarakulanji – Ranni Road deviates along Punaloor Moovattupuzha Main Eastern Hwy
- Vadasserikkera
- Perunad
- Lahai
- Plappally
  - Plappally – Pamba (Sabarimala Road), deviates to Angamoozhy
- Vandiperiyar
  - Kakki Kavala – Joins NH 183 near Vandiperiyar

== See also ==
- List of national highways in India
- National Highways Development Project
