= State Highway 1 (Kerala) =

State highway in Kerala, India

State Highway 1
- KL SH 1 highlighted in red

Route information
- Maintained by Kerala Public Works Department
- Length: 240.6 km (149.5 mi)
- Existed: 1790s–present
- Component highways: National Highway 183 near Chengannur/Kottarakara to Kottayam. Crosses National Highway 183A at Adoor. Crosses National Highway 744 at Kottarakara. Crosses National Highway 85 at Muvattupuzha.

Major junctions
- South end: Kesavadasapuram, Thiruvananthapuram
- SH 47, Vembayam; SH 46, Kilimanoor; SH 64, Nilamel; SH 48, Ayoor; NH 744, Kottarakara; NH 183A / SH 5, Adoor; SH 7, Thiruvalla; NH 183, Kottayam; NH 85 / SH 41, Moovattupuzha; SH 16, Perumbavoor
- North end: NH 544 in Angamaly

Location
- Country: India
- State: Kerala
- Districts: Thiruvananthapuram, Kollam, Pathanamthitta, Alappuzha, Kottayam, Ernakulam

Highway system
- Roads in India; Expressways; National; State; Asian; State Highways in Kerala
→ SH 2

Kerala's State Highway 1 or KL SH 1, also known as Main Central Road or MC Road, is the arterial state highway starting from Kesavadasapuram in Thiruvananthapuram and ends at Angamaly, a suburb of Greater Cochin in Ernakulam district, in the state of Kerala, India. The highway was built by Raja Kesavadas, Dewan of Travancore, in the 1790s. Plan for a new highway called Thiruvananthapuram–Angamaly Greenfield Highway, which runs parallel to the KL SH 1 is proposed and is under early stage of development.

== Route description ==
This road starts from National Highway 66 at Kesavadasapuram in Thiruvananthapuram, the capital city of Kerala, and joins the NH544 at Angamaly Ernakulam district. The KL SH 1 passes through Venjaramoodu, Kilimanoor, Nilamel, Chadayamangalam, Ayoor, Kottarakkara, Enathu, Adoor, Pandalam, Chengannur, Tiruvalla, Changanassery, Kottayam, Ettumanoor, Kuravilangad, Monippally, Puthuvely, Koothattukulam, Meenkunnam, Muvattupuzha, Pezhakkappilly, Mannoor, Pulluvazhy, Perumbavoor and Kalady. In addition, an MC bypass road linking thaikkad with Vettu road junction near NH66 in Kazhakoottam is also part of the road in Thiruvananthapuram district. Before NH 544 was built through Angamaly, KL SH 1 extended up to Karukutty village 6 km (3.7 mi) away from Angamaly town in the Chalakudy road. A section of this road between Mulakuzha and Kottayam is now upgraded as a section of NH 183. KL SH 1 is a popular route to access the shrine of Sabarimala. It covers many important towns of Central and South Kerala.

== History ==
The highway was built by Raja Kesavadas, the dewan of the Travancore Kingdom. The KL SH 1 was renovated under the World Bank aided 'Kerala State Transport Project (2006)'. The upgrading was carried out in two phases. Under phase 1, two stretches, Thaikkod (near Venjarammoodu) – Chengannur and Muvattupuzha – Angamaly were upgraded and works were completed in 2010. In addition, a new road link to NH 66 has been completed between Thaikkad and Vettu road (near Kazhakootam in Trivandrum). In phase 2, the Chengannur – Ettumanoor 47 km (29 mi) stretch was upgraded. The road has a total width of 10 metres (33 ft) and facilitates two-lane traffic. The road also have a 7-metre (23 ft) carriageway and a sealed shoulder, having width of 1.5 metres (4 ft 11 in). The project also features protection walls and adequate drainage facilities. The construction of seven bridges has also been envisaged as part of the project. This includes the constructions at Neelimangalam, Manipuzha, Pannikuzhy, Arattukadavu, Illimala, Thondara, and Kallissery. In addition, three existing bridges along the route is also widened. The work was launched on 14 September 2014 and completed in 2018.

== Main intersections ==
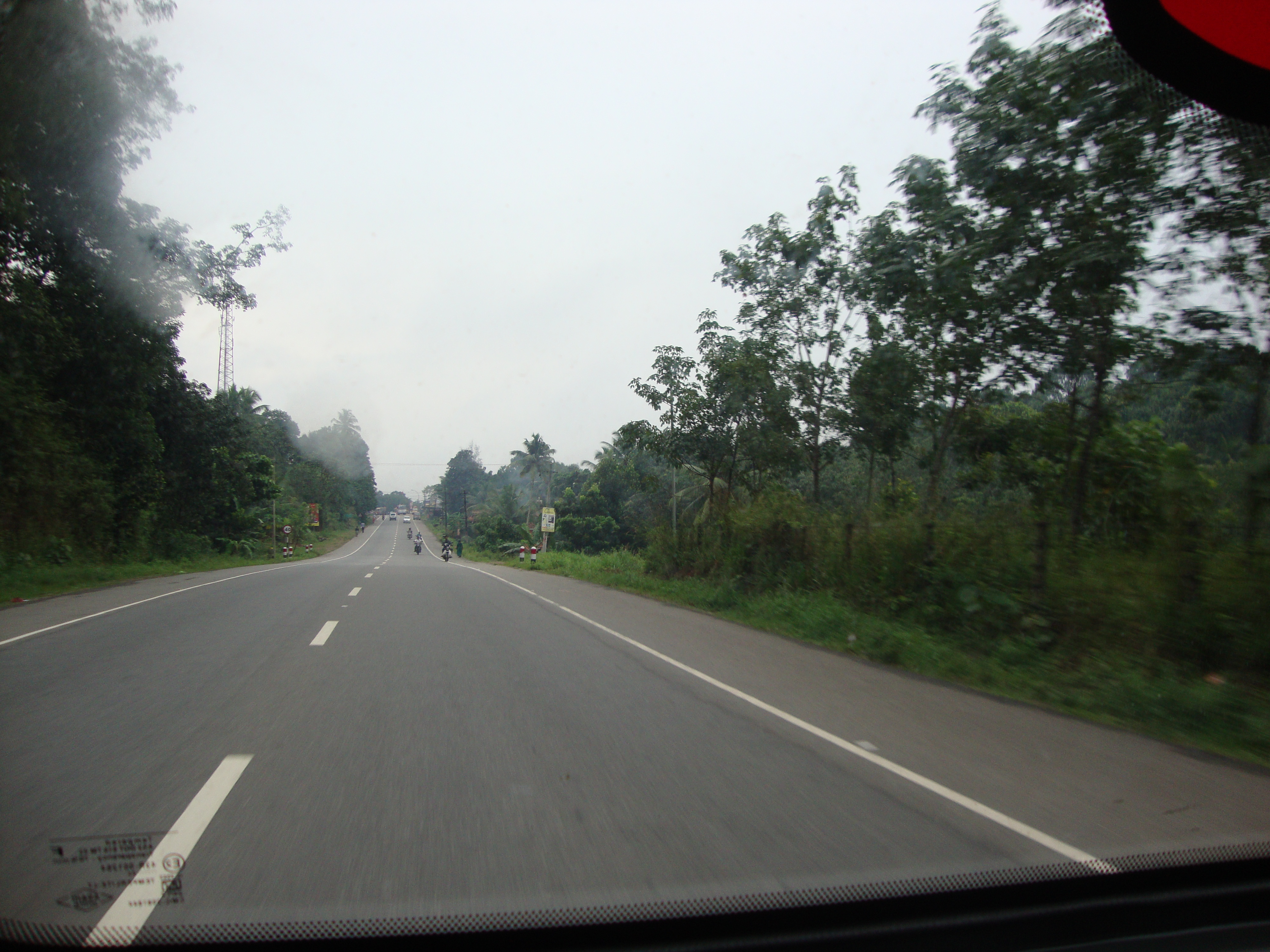
M.C Road near Chengannur

- Kesavadasapuram in Trivandrum joins with the National Highway 66
- Mannanthala -(Sreekaryam - Peroorkada Road)
- Vattapara - (Pothencode- Nedumangad Road)
- Vembayam - State Highway 47 (Kerala) connecting Attingal and Nedumangadu
- Thaikkad jn - MC Bypass road
- Venjarammoodu - State Highway 47 (Kerala) connecting Attingal and Nedumangadu
- Kilimanoor - State Highway 46 (Kerala) connecting Attingal and Kilimanoor
- Nilamel - State Highway 64 Connecting Varkala & Madathara
- Ayoor (Kollam Road & State Highway 48)
- Kottarakara NH 744 (Kollam- Thirumangalam Road crosses)
- Adoor Central Junction (Pathanamthitta road National Highway 183A (India) & State Highway 5 )
- Adoor High School Junction (State Highway 5)
- Pandalam Medical Mission Junction (Pandalam- Nooranad- Kayamkulam road via Kudassanad)
- Pandalam (Mavelikkara-Pathanamthitta road) SH-80( State Highway 80 )-Konni-Haipad-RoadKonni-Haipad Road
- Pandalam (Kulanada T.B Junction Pandalam - Aranmula road via Kulanada)
- Mulakuzha (Mavelikara- road via Kodukulanji)
- Chengannur (Mavelikara road via Puliyoor, Kerala)
- Thiruvalla (SH-07 towards Pathanamthitta & Kumbazha)
- Thiruvalla (Ambalapuzha, Kayamkulam road)
- Changanassery (Alapuzha road)
- Changanassery (Vakathanam Road & Vazhoor Road)
- Kottayam (NH 220 towards Kumily & Teni)
- Kottayam Baker Jn. (Kumarakom) & Cherthala
- Ettumanur (MG University road)
- Ettumanur (Pala & Poonjar road)
- Ettumanur (Vaikom & Ernakulam road)
- Kuravilangad (Vaikom & Alapuzha road)
- Kuravilangad (Pala road)
- Kuravilangad (Njeezhoor & Peruva & Piravom road)
- Monippally (Ernakulam-Pala road, Piravom, Peruva, Vaikom, Ramapuram, Uzhavoor road)
- Koothattukulam (Pala, Piravom & Kalamassery Proposed NH Road)
- Muvattupuzha (Thodupuzha Road, Main Eastern Highway End Reach)
- Muvattupuzha (Kochi-Madurai NH 49 Intersection)
- Perumbavoor (Aluva-Munnar Road & Kolenchery Road)
- Kalady (Malayattoor Road & Aluva Deasm Road)
- Kalady (Mattoor Junction, Nedumbassery Airport, North Paravur Road)
- Angamali (NH 544)

== Surveillance ==
The Motor Vehicles Department, in partnership with the Kerala Road Safety Authority (KRSA) and the police has installed automatic traffic enforcement camera systems in between Venjaramoodu - Chengannur section of KL SH 1 for detecting speed violations of vehicles.

== See also ==
- Thiruvananthapuram-Angamaly Greenfield Highway
- Punalur -Muvattupuzha road
- National Highway 183 (India)
- NH 66
- NH 544
- Roads in Kerala
- List of state highways in Kerala
