= West Jyoti Nagar =

West Jyoti Nagar is a residential area of Shahdara, a suburb of Delhi, India.

West Jyoti Nagar consists of bungalows and khoties and upper class residents. Old name of west jyoti nagar was sikdarpur village It is situated 2.5 km from Shahdara Metro Station on both sides of the Delhi-Saharanpur main highway, also called Loni Road. The Central Park was many sites such as the Jyoteshwar Mahadev Temple worshipping Lord Shiva, the inn Agrasen Dharamshala, Chotta Shiva temple, Durga Temple, Kaushik Street, Tomar Niwas etc. The Central Park is famous for their Shivaratri, Navratri, Dashera & Janamashtami celebrations. Govt. Primary School and Senior Secondary School are some important schools in this area. This area is green colony and there are many parks in this colony specially in west jyoti nagar opposite to the sr. secondary school.it is situated 1 km from guru teg bahaudur hospital which is very famous hospital of delhi.one of the busy chowk called durgapuri chowk is next to the jyoti nagar.
