= Peruva =

- village
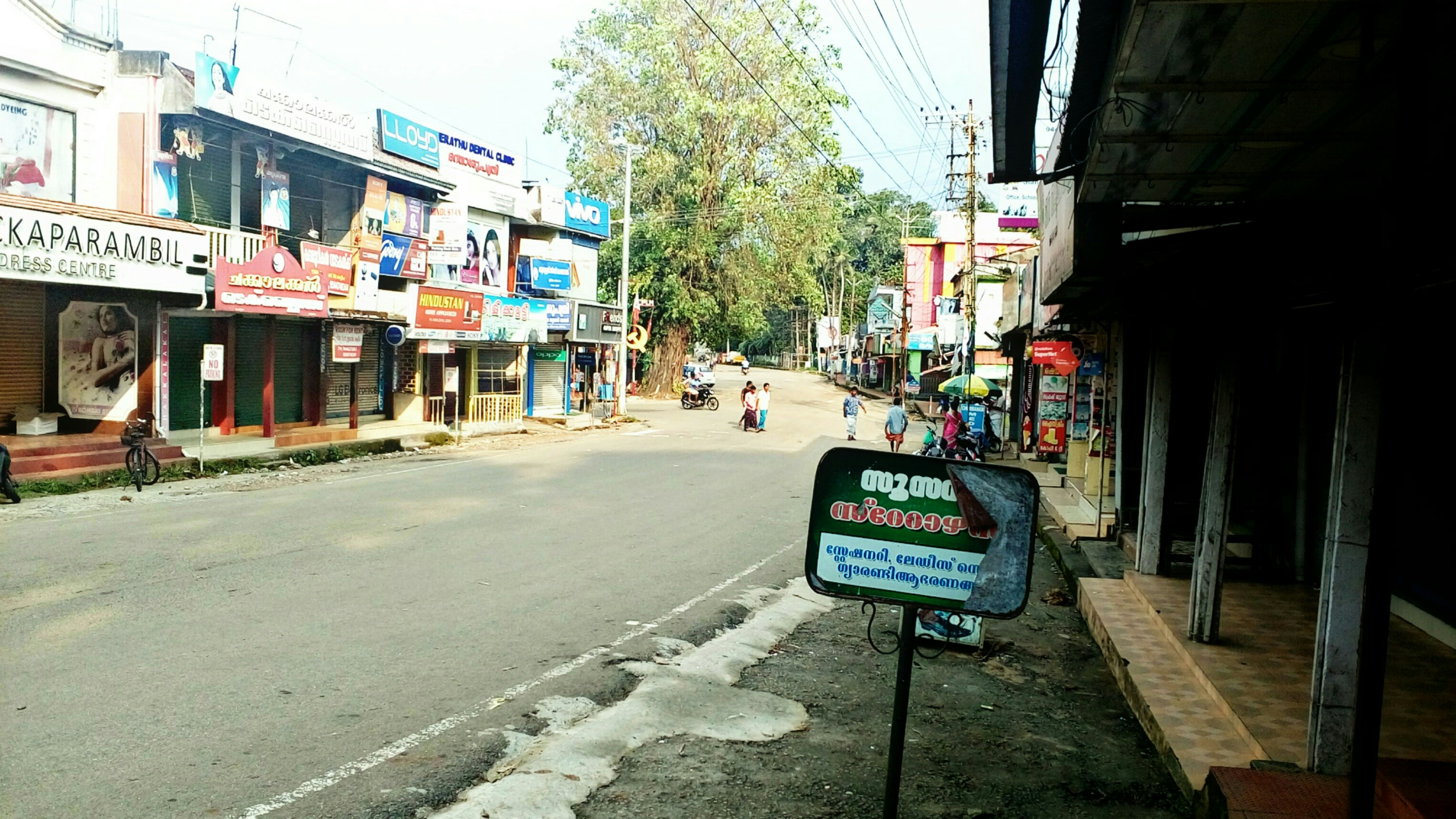
- Peruva Town

- Location in Kerala, India Peruva (India)
- Coordinates: 9.85301°N 76.5767455°E
- Country: India
- State: Kerala
- District: Kottayam

Languages
  - Official: Malayalam, English
- Time zone: UTC+5:30 (IST)
- PIN: 686610
- Telephone code: 04829
- Vehicle registration: KL-36
- Lok Sabha constituency: Kottayam
- Vidhan Sabha constituency: Kaduthuruthy
- Civic agency: Mulakulam Panchyath
- Climate: Moderate (Köppen)

Peruva is a small village in the Mulakulam panchayat of Kottayam district in Kerala. It is located 35 km from Kottayam and 40 km from Ernakulam. The other nearby towns are piravom (6 km), Kaduthuruthy (8 km), and Thalayolaparambu (10 km).

== Banks & ATM ==
- Central Bank of India, branch & ATM
- State Bank of India, branch & ATM (2 Nos)
- Federal Bank, branch & ATM
- Kerala Gramin Bank
- IndusInd Bank
