= Monippally =

- town
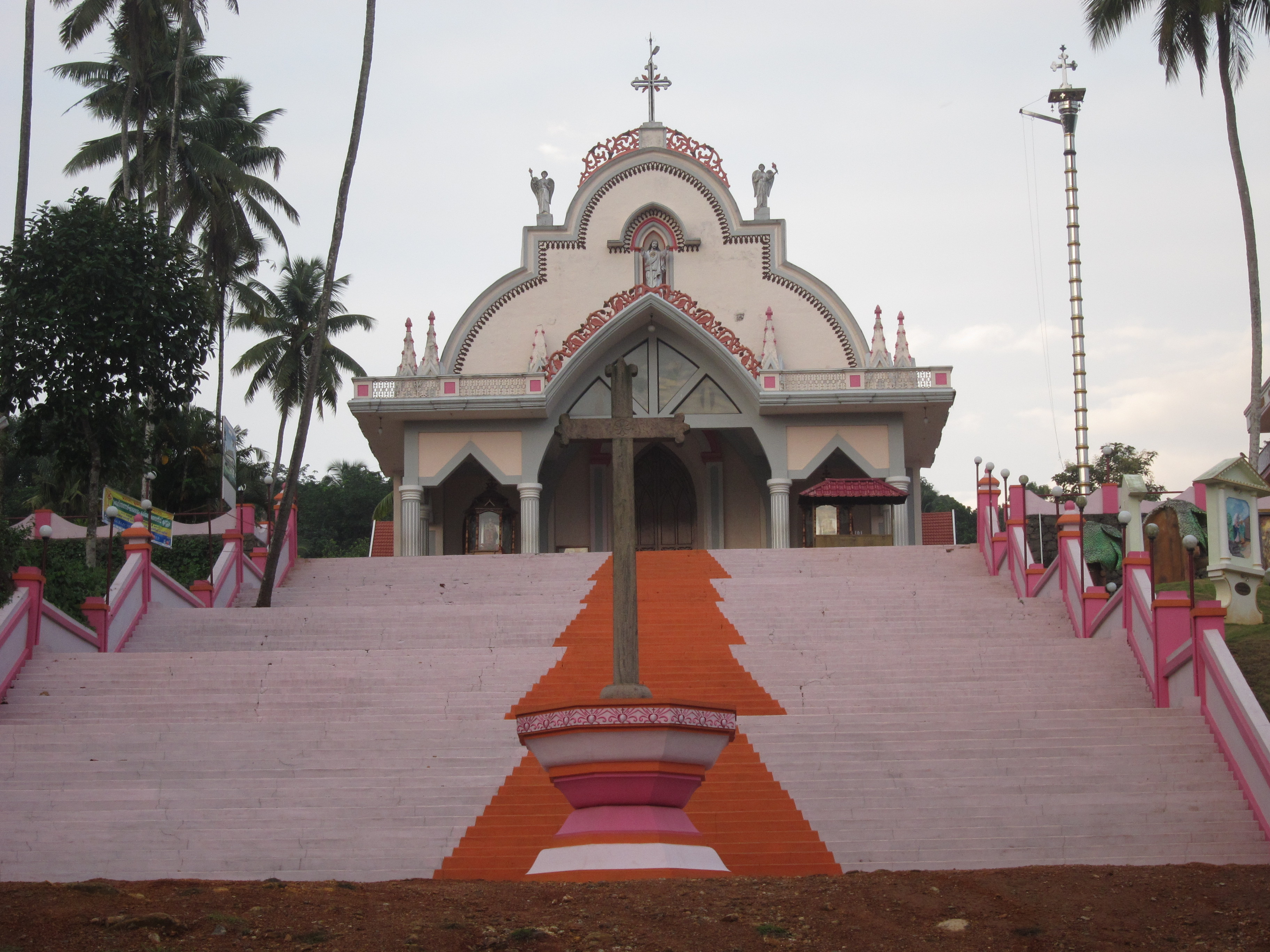
- Knanaya Church
- Nickname: Monippally - 'The Spicy Virgin Village'
- Interactive map of Monippally
- Coordinates: 9.806462°N 76.575351°E
- Country: India
- State: Kerala
- District: Kottayam

Languages
  - Official: Malayalam, English
- Time zone: UTC+5:30 (IST)
- PIN: 686636
- Vehicle registration: KL-67
- Nearest city: Kottayam, Pala, Thodupuzha, Muvattupuzha
- Lok Sabha constituency: Kottayam

Monippally is a small village in Kottayam district, Kerala, South India. Formerly known as 'Mohanappally' (Beautiful Place) or 'Munippally' (Temple of Munis, Sage or Saints). In her yesteryears, Monippally was a famous ginger cultivation area in Central Travancore. Dry Ginger, Turmeric and Kacholam were the main attractions of trade.

== Location ==
Monippally town is located in between Kuravilangad and Koothattukulam on the M C Road (SH1). This village is part of Uzhavoor Grama Panchayat in Meenachil (Pala) Taluk. Uzhavoor, Veliyannoor, Koothattukulam, Vazhithala, Achickal, Elanji, Njeezhoor and Kuravilangad are the neighboring areas. The nearest municipality is Pala.

== Economy ==
Monippally's non-resident population has always had a significant impact on its economy. But agriculture is the soul of Monippallians, and is critically important to its economy. Villagers are engaged in crop plantations of rubber, cocoa, vanilla, black pepper, ginger and turmeric. Due to a large amount of emigration, and thus a large amount of foreign cash flowing into the village, the village has a very high social life index - very high literacy rates and high occurrence of "creature comforts".

== Education ==
There's a strong emphasis on education and healthcare - there are seven schools and three hospitals within a 4 km² area. As well as five catholic churches and one Hindu temple. The area was rich in ginger cultivation. The first ginger Co-operative Society (Monippally Marketing Co-operative Society) was founded here.

The late senior congress leaders M. A. John and Adv K. Joseph Monippally (Farmers Leader, Veteran Co-operator) hailed from this village.
