= Vadakkemanna =

Coordinates: 11°02′N 76°04′E

Vadakkemanna is a place situated in Malappuram district of Kerala, India. It is a suburb of Malappuram.
