= Pulimath =

Pulimath pulimath
- village
- Location in Kerala, India Pulimath (India)
- Coordinates: 8.742006°N 76.894083°E
- Country: India
- State: Kerala
- District: Thiruvananthapuram
- Talukas: Chirayinkeezhu

Government
  - Body: Gram panchayat

Population (2011)
  - Total: 22,045

Languages
  - Official: Malayalam, English
- Time zone: UTC+5:30 (IST)
- PIN: 695612
- Telephone code: 0470
- Vehicle registration: KL-

Pulimath is a village in Thiruvananthapuram district in the state of Kerala, India.

== Demographics ==
As of 2011 India census, Pulimath had a population of 22,045 with 10,212 males and 11,833 females.
