= Thekkemala =

- village
- Location in Kerala, India Thekkemala (India)
- Coordinates: 9.3268200°N 76.7053530°E
- Country: India
- State: Kerala
- District: Pathanamthitta

Languages
  - Official: Malayalam, English
- Time zone: UTC+5:30 (IST)
- Vehicle registration: KL-03

Thekkemala is a village near Kozhencherry in Pathanamthitta district, Kerala, India.

== Transportation ==
Thekkemala is a junction with roads to towns like Aranmula, Chengannur, Pandalam, and Pathanamthitta.

== Churches ==
On the way to Kozhencherry there is a big Malankara Orthodox Syrian Church named Mar Beshanania Church. It's a four way junction leading to Pathanamthitta, Punnakadu, Aranmula.

There is also a Pentecostal Mission church named Thekkemala Apostolic Mission (TAMI).

== Demographics ==
The majority of the population are Christians and Hindus.
