= Kodakara =

- Town
- Kodakara
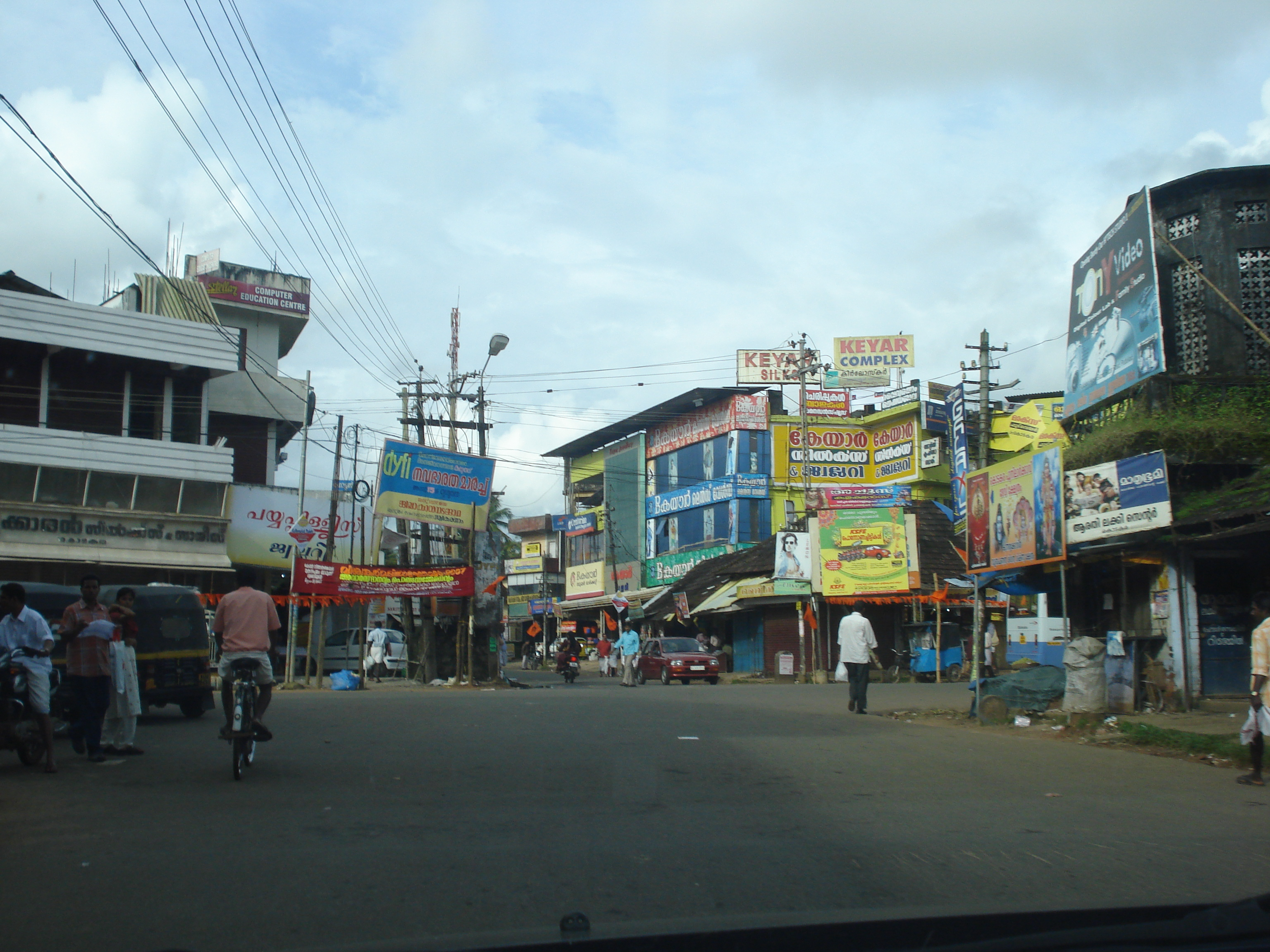
- Kodakara Town in 2007

- Location in Kerala, India Kodakara (India)
- Coordinates: 10.3719°N 76.3056°E
- Country: India
- State: Kerala
- District: Thrissur

Government
  - Body: Kodakara Grama Panchayath

Area
  - Total: 21.29 km^{2} (8.22 sq mi)
- Elevation: 12 m (39 ft)

Population (2011)
  - Total: 32,201
  - Density: 1,512/km^{2} (3,917/sq mi)

Languages
  - Official: Malayalam, English
- Time zone: UTC+5:30 (IST)
- PIN: 680684
- Telephone code: 0480
- Vehicle registration: KL-64

Kodakara is a prominent town situated in the Thrissur district of Kerala, India. Located along National Highway 544 (NH 544), the town lies approximately 20 km (12 mi) south of the district headquarters at Thrissur, 7.5 km (4.7 mi) south of Puthukkad, and 10 km (6 mi) north of Chalakudy.

Administratively, the town is governed by the Kodakara Grama Panchayat and is positioned within the Chalakudy taluk and the Irinjalakuda revenue division. For legislative representation, Kodakara falls under both the Chalakudy Legislative Assembly constituency and the Chalakudy Lok Sabha constituency.

Instagram account @kodakarastories

== Demographics ==
As of 2011 Census of India, Kodakara had a population of 32,201 with 15,473 males and 16,728 females.

== Recent History ==
In April 2021, the town was the center of a major political controversy known as the Kodakara hawala case, involving the alleged seizure of ₹3.5 crore of illegal election campaign funds linked to state political leadership.The case was subsequently handed over to the Enforcement Directorate for further financial investigation.
