= Ayoor =

Ayur Ayoor
- Town
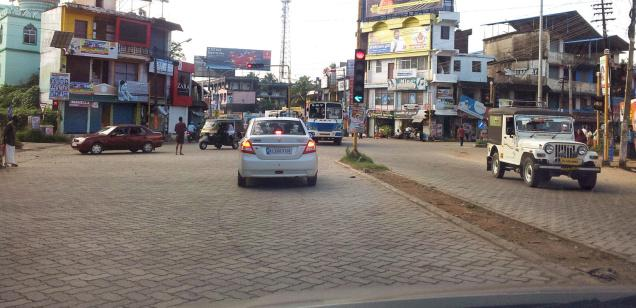
- A picture of Ayoor Junction

- Location in Kerala, India
- Coordinates: 8.897318°N 76.860569°E
- Taluk: Punalur
- State: Kerala
- District: Kollam

Languages
  - Official: Malayalam, English
- Time zone: UTC+5:30 (IST)
- PIN: 691533
- Telephone code: 04752
- Vehicle registration: KL-25

Ayoor is a Town in Edamulakkal Panchayath of Punalur Taluk, Kollam district, Kerala state, India. Ayoor is located on the M C Road or state highway One. Jadayu Nature Park, Chadayamangalam is only 3.5 km away from ayoor. 32 km east of Kollam City and 55 km north of Thiruvananthapuram City. Ayoor is 17 km south of Kottarakara, 19km from Punalur and Anchal is 8 km away.

The place is a commercial center with rubber, paddy, cashew and pepper being the main trading items. The nearest airport is Thiruvananthapuram International Airport, 62 km south of Ayoor.

Kollam Junction Railway Station is 31 km and Trivandrum central Railway station 54 km away from Ayoor.

== Colleges ==
- Marthoma College Of Science and Technology
- College of Teacher Education, Ayoor
