= Choondal =

- village
- Location in Kerala, India Choondal (India)
- Coordinates: 10.617510°N 76.094710°E
- Country: India
- State: Kerala
- District: Thrissur

Government
  - Body: Choondal Grama Panchayath, Chowvannur Grama Panchayath, Kandanassery Grama Panchayath

Population (2011)
  - Total: 12,502

Languages
  - Official: Malayalam, English
- Time zone: UTC+5:30 (IST)
- PIN: 680502
- Telephone code: 04885
- Vehicle registration: KL-
- Nearest city: Thrissur
- Lok Sabha constituency: Thrissur (Lok Sabha constituency)
- Vidhan Sabha constituency: Manalur Assembly Constituency

Choondal is a village in Thrissur district in the state of Kerala, India.

== Demographics ==
As of 2011 India census, Choondal had a population of 12502 with 5866 males and 6636 females. Choondal is about 20 kilometers away from Thrissur, where you can see a panoramic view of green grass fields. This place is known in Thrissur District for its educational institutions, hospitals and places of worship. Paddy, coconut and Areca nut are the major produces of this village. From this junction we turn to Guruvayoor which is about 8 km away from Choondal The Catholics of this area comes under the parishes of San Thome Church, Choondal and Nativity of Our Lady church Puthuessery.

== Educational Institutions ==
De Paul EMHS, Choondal

LIGHS, Choondal

Government UP School, Choondal

== Temples in Choondal ==
- Melekavu temple
- Parappuram Mahavishnu Temple
- Payyurkkavu Sree Durga Bhagavathi Temple
- Thayamkkavu Sri Ayyappa Temple
- Parappur Sri Devi temple
- Payyur Subramanya Swami Temple
