= Kesavadasapuram =

Location in the map
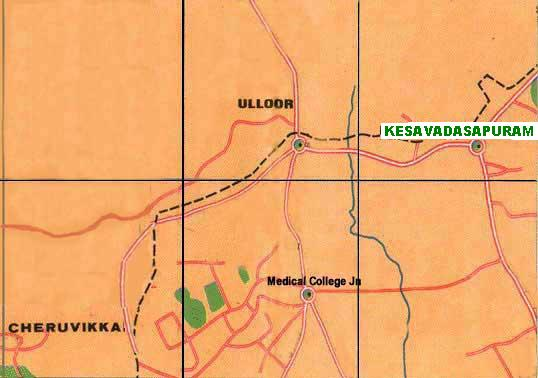
- Location: Thiruvananthapuram

Kesavadasapuram is a major junction in Thiruvananthapuram city, Kerala, India. It is the meeting point of National Highway 66 and MC Road (State Highway 1). While coming from the city centre, at the junction, the MC road goes to the right towards Kottayam and NH 66 goes to the left, towards Kollam. The place is named after Raja Kesavadas, the Diwan of erstwhile Travancore kingdom. It is also a major commercial and educational hub with many adjacent institutions like Mahathma Gandhi College, Mar Ivanios College, Mar Baselios Engineering College, Mar Gregorios Law College, Sarvodaya Vidyalaya, St. Mary's School etc.
