= Nilamel =

Human settlement in Kollam, Kerala, India

Nilamel is a locality located in Kollam District of Kerala, India. It lies on the M C Road Thiruvananthapuram-Angamali state highway-1) and is 45 km from Thiruvananthapuram, 24 km away from Kottarakara and 5 km away from Kadakkal.

== Geography ==
Nilamel is located at 8°49′00″N 76°53′00″E. District: Kollam Area : 22 km Population: 14,208 Literacy : 89.5%
