= Venjarammoodu =

Venjaramoodu
- Town
- Location in Kerala Location in India
- Coordinates: 8°41′0″N 76°56′0″E
- Country: India
- State: Kerala
- District: Thiruvananthapuram
- Revenue Division: Nedumangad
- Taluk: Nedumangad

Government
  - Type: Civic Body Government
  - Body: Nellanadu Grama Panchayat

Languages
  - Official: Malayalam, English
- Time zone: UTC+5:30 (IST)
- PIN: 695607
- Telephone code: +91 472-XXXXXXX
- Vehicle registration: KL-21
- Coastline: 0 kilometres (0 mi)
- Nearest city: Thiruvananthapuram
- Lok Sabha constituency: Attingal

Venjaramoodu is a town north-east of Thiruvananthapuram city, the capital of Kerala. It is 9 km (5.6 mi) east of Attingal, 11 km (6.8 mi) northwest of Nedumangad and 12 km (7.5 mi) northeast of Thiruvananthapuram City.

== Geography ==
Venjaramoodu is a town in the district of Thiruvananthapuram, Kerala. It is 25 km (16 mi)north of Thiruvananthapuram on MC Road (SH1). It comes under Nedumangad Taluk. The Kazhakkuttam bypass ends at Thycadu, near by Venjaramood. The nearest airport is Thiruvananthapuram International Airport and railway station is Chirayinkeezhu Railway station. Kerala State Road Transport Corporation operates a bus depot at Venjarammoodu. It is well connected to all parts of the state by state road transport buses. Gokulam Medical College and Muslim Association College of Engineering are located here. Venjaramoodu Government higher secondary school is located besides the Main Central road.

TRIVANDRUM CITY, KAZHAKOOTAM, TRV INTL. AIRPORT
IIST ↑ Technopark'
Nedumangadu	←	VENJARAMOODU	→		
Vithura	←	VENJARAMOODU	→	Attingal	Pothencode
Ponmudy	←	VENJARAMOODU	→	Varkala	
Chenkotta	←	VENJARAMOODU	→	Kollam	
	←	↓	→		
	←	KOTTARAKARA.	→		

== Transport ==
=== Road ===
Two dedicated bus depots are available in the forms of a Kerala State Road Transport Corporation(KSRTC) bus depot and one private bus terminal, both in the heart of the town. KSRTC operate city bus service, local bus service and fast passenger.Clapping services can also be found here.

City service using Anathapuri bus, low floor AC/ Non-AC, Venad.

Venjaramoodu- East fort via Pothenkodu/ Kaniyapuram- Kazhakoottam- Technopark-Chakka- General Hospital/ Enchakal.

Venjaramoodu- East fort Via Vembayam- Mannathala/ Sreekaryam- Pattom.

==== Local bus routes ====
Attingal, Nedumangadu, Medical College, Thampanur, Pothenkodu, Varkala, Ponmudy, Kilimanoor, Kallara, Vembayam, Muthuvila, Palode, Thempamoodu, etc.

All Super Fast, Fast, Express, Scania bus through MC road passing through Venjaramoodu KSRTC Bus dippo.

Private buses operate to Attingal, Varkala, Kadakkavour, Chirayinkeezhu, Paravour town.

=== Rail ===
- Nearest railway stations
- Murukkumpuzha Railway station (16 km [9.9 mi])
- Chirayinkeezhu railway station (18 km [11 mi])
- Kadakkavoor railway station (20 km [12 mi])
- Varkala Railway Station (26 km [16 mi])
- Thiruvananthapuram Central Railway station (27 km [17 mi])

=== Air ===
- Thiruvananthapuram International Airport is 27 km (17 mi) away.

== Religion ==
The population in Venjaramoodu practices Hinduism, Christianity and Islam. Venjaramoodu is also famous for Manikkodu Mahadeva Temple which held every year 10 day festival with Manikkodu carnival.

- Here is a list of important religious places:-
- Manikkodu Mahadeva Temple Vayyatte
- Pirappankodu Sree Krishna Temple
- Thiru Vamanamoothi Temple Anakudy (just 5 km [3.1 mi])
- Venkamala Temple (9 km [5.6 mi])
- Kavara Bhagavathi Temple
- Mukkunur Sreekanda Shatha Temple
- Alanthara Uruttumandapam
- Alanthara Shastha Temple
- Vettur Mahavishnu Temple
- Subramanya Temple Thandrampoika
- Gokulathamma Temple, Gokulam Medical College
- Amundirath Devi Temple Mudakal
- Vidaynkavu Temple, Kunnida, Velavur
- Parameswram Temple
- Kottukunnam Mahadeva Temple
- Aliyadu Oorootumandapam Temple
- Venjaramoodu Muslim Juma Masjid
- Manikkal Juma Masjid
- Keezhayikonam Masjid
- St.Joseph's Church Kottapuram, Pirappancode
- Koppam CSI Church
- Seventh Day Adventist Church Thumpara, Pirappancode
- Kunnil sree Bhadhra kaalee kshethram

== Notable people ==
- Priyanka Nair, actress
- Thulasidas, film director
- Suraj Venjaramoodu, actor
- K. Raman Pillai, politician
- Harilal Rajendran, writer
- Noby Marcose, actor
- S R Lal, writer

== Major banks ==
- State Bank of India
- Central Bank of India
- Federal Bank
- South Indian Bank
- Indian Overseas Bank
- Syndicate Bank
- Kerala Grameen Bank
- ICICI Bank
- HDFC Bank
- IDBI Bank
- Union Bank Pirapancodu
- Kerala Bank
- Canara Bank, Thycadu
- ESAF Bank, Thycadu
- Venjaramoodu service Co-Operative Bank

== Climate ==
Venjaramoodu has significant rainfall most months, with a short dry season. This location is classified as Am by Köppen and Geiger. The temperature here averages 26.8 °C (80.2 °F). About 1,952 mm (76.9 in) of precipitation falls annually. The driest month is January. There is 23 mm (0.91 in) of precipitation in January. In June, the precipitation reaches its peak, with an average of 355 mm (14.0 in). With an average of 28.4 °C (83.1 °F), April is the warmest month. At 25.7 °C (78.3 °F) on average, December is the coldest month of the year.

Climate data for venjaramoodu, Kerala
Month	Jan	Feb	Mar	Apr	May	Jun	Jul	Aug	Sep	Oct	Nov	Dec	Year
Mean daily maximum °C (°F)	29.5 (85.1)	30.6 (87.1)	31.8 (89.2)	31.8 (89.2)	31.5 (88.7)	29.3 (84.7)	28.8 (83.8)	29.2 (84.6)	29.5 (85.1)	29.4 (84.9)	28.9 (84.0)	29 (84)	29.9 (85.9)
Mean daily minimum °C (°F)	22.3 (72.1)	22.9 (73.2)	25.1 (77.2)	25.2 (77.4)	23.9 (75.0)	23.6 (74.5)	23.6 (74.5)	23.6 (74.5)	23.6 (74.5)	23.6 (74.5)	23.2 (73.8)	22.5 (72.5)	23.6 (74.5)
Average precipitation mm (inches)	22 (0.9)	29 (1.1)	51 (2.0)	134 (5.3)	207 (8.1)	355 (14.0)	264 (10.4)	174 (6.9)	175 (6.9)	273 (10.7)	203 (8.0)	64 (2.5)	1,951 (76.8)
Source: Climate-Data.org
