= National Highway 966 (India) =

National highway in India

National Highway 966

- Schematic map of National Highways in India

Route information
- Length: 125 km (78 mi)

Major junctions
- From: Ramanattukara, Kozhikode, Kerala
- To: Palakkad, Kerala

Location
- Country: India
- States: Kerala: 125 km
- Primary destinations: Kondotty, Malappuram, Perinthalmanna, Mannarkkad

Highway system
- Roads in India; Expressways; National; State; Asian
← NH 66	→ NH 544

National Highway 966 (NH 966) is a highway which connects Palakkad, Malappuram and Kozhikode district headquarters in Kerala. It was previously known as NH 213. It covers a distance of 125 km.

The four laning of the National Highway 966, sanctioned in February 2025, is expected to cover 120 km in Malappuram, Kozhikode and Palakkad.

At Ramanattukara, near Kozhikode, it joins NH 66. At Palakkad it joins NH 544, which connects Coimbatore and Cochin through Palakkad. The Palakkad–Malappuram–Kozhikode Greenfield Highway has been proposed in order to decongest the traffic on NH 966 and reduce travelling time between Kozhikode and Palakkad.

== See also ==
- National Highways Development Project
- List of national highways in India
- Palakkad–Kozhikode Greenfield Highway
