= Anchal =

Town in Kerala, India

- Town
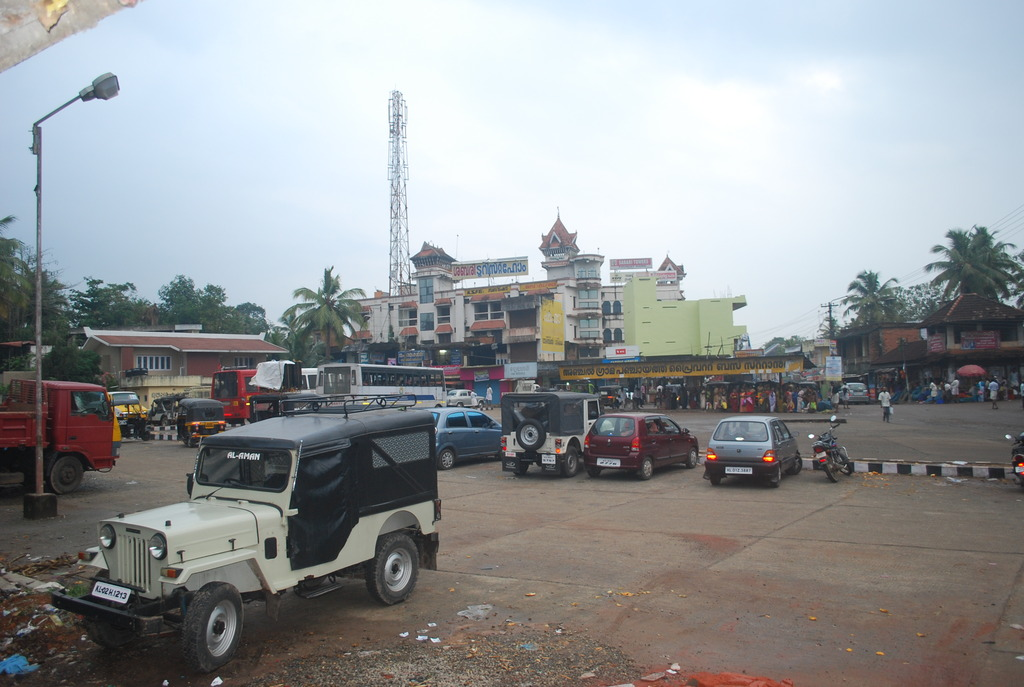
- Panchayat Bus Stand in Anchal Market Junction

- Location in Kerala, India Anchal (India)
- Coordinates: 08°55′45″N 76°55′05″E
- Country: India
- State: Kerala
- District: Kollam

Government
  - Type: Panchayat raj
  - Body: Anchal grama panchayat

Area
  - Total: 24.45 km^{2} (9.44 sq mi)
- Elevation: 45 m (148 ft)

Population
  - Total: 33,088

Languages
  - Official: Malayalam, English
- Time zone: UTC+5:30 (IST)
- PIN: 691306
- Telephone code: 0475
- Vehicle registration: KL-25
- Climate: Monsoon (Köppen)
- Literacy Rate: 95%

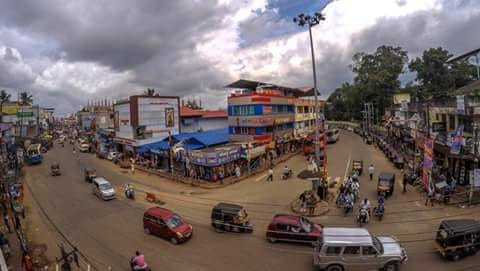

Anchal is a growing town and a gram panchayat in Kollam district of Kerala, India.

== Etymology ==
There are several legends about the origin of the name Anchal. One legend states that there used to be an "Anchalappis" at the site of the present range office junction, from which the name "Anchal" originates. Another legend recounts how five disputes evolved in the region, leading to the name of the "land of five disputes, proverbs or puzzles". Another myth is that the five Banyan trees, or "Aal", in the region are the origin of the name Anchal, a portmanteau of Anch, meaning five, and Aal, meaning Banyan tree.

== Transport ==
The nearest railway stations are the Punalur Railway Station and the Kollam Junction Railway Station, located 14 km and 38 km away, respectively. Kollam Junction is the second largest railway station in Kerala by area and is also one of the oldest. Punalur Railway Station is about 11 km from Anchal and currently connects to Kollam, Thiruvananthapuram, Kottayam, Ernakulam, Thrissur, Palakkad, Nagarcoil, Kanyakumari, Tirunelveli and Madurai. The nearest International Airport is Trivandrum International Airport, located 55 km from Anchal in the city of Thiruvananthapuram. It is the main international airport in the state of Kerala and offers both national and international flights. Anchal is located between National Highway 744 and the Main Central Road. A new bypass opened for traffic on May 17, 2024, following long-standing demand from the local people. Multiple bus services also run between Anchal and other places in Kerala.

== Demographics ==
In the 2011 Census of India, Anchal had a population of 33,098, of which 15,732 were male and 17,356 were female. The literacy rate is 95%, with 96.7% of males literate and 93.49% of females literate. The total employed population is 11,960. 71% of the population that are employed are male and 29% are female. Scheduled Caste members make up 9.04% of the population, while Scheduled Tribe members make up 0.25%.

== Notable people ==
- Rajiv Anchal - a film director, screenwriter, and sculptor who works in Malayalam language cinema
- B. Kemal Pasha - a retired judge of the high court of Kerala
- Resul Pookutty - Academy Award winning Sound Engineer
- K. Raju Ex Forests and Wildlife minister of Kerala
