= Roads in Kerala =

Roads in the Indian state

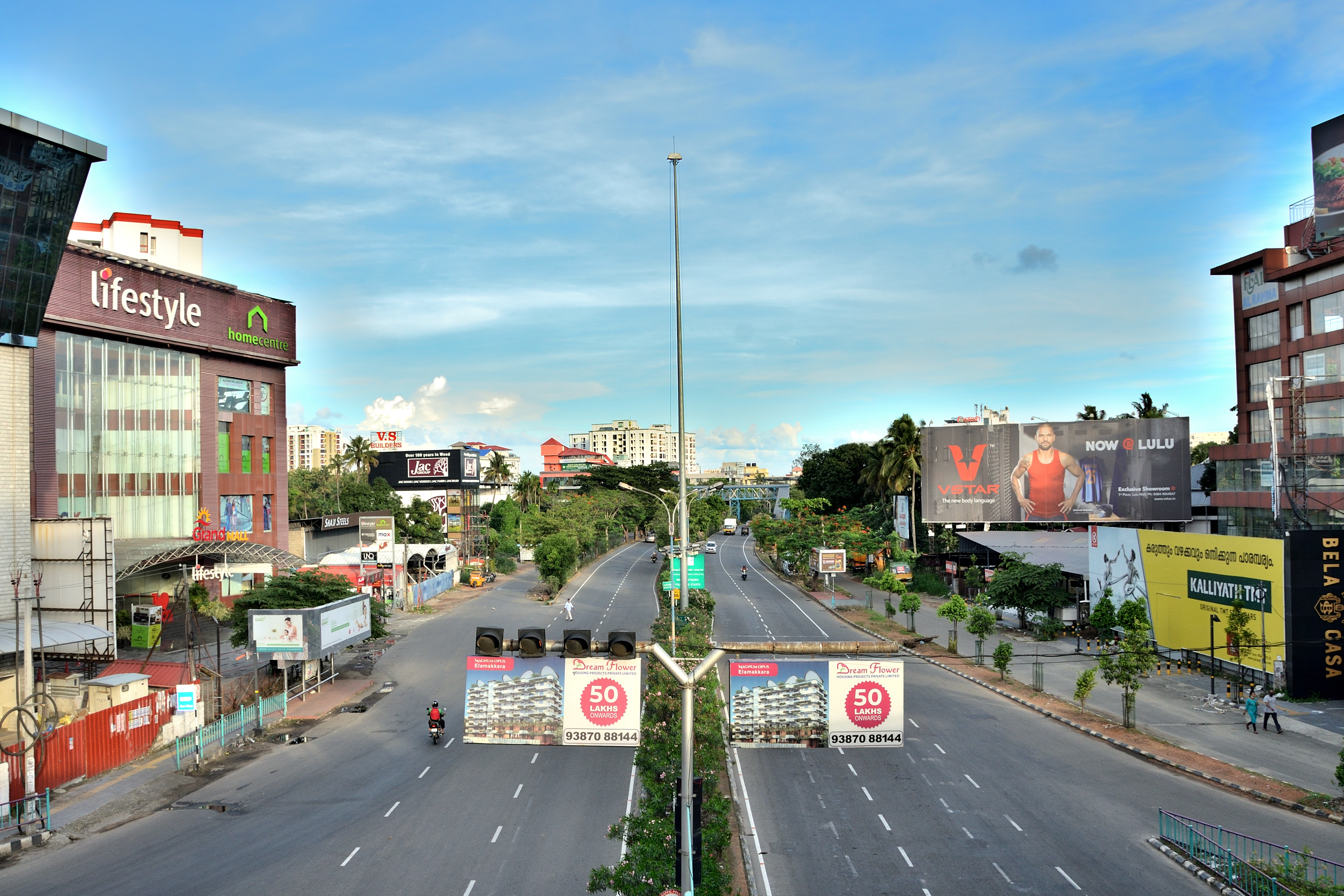
Edappally - Aroor NH 66 near Kochi

Kerala, a state in Southern India, has a network of 11 National Highways, 83 State Highways and many district roads.Kollam currently has most number of National Highways (6)

The Network of National Highways in KeralaMap

== Features ==
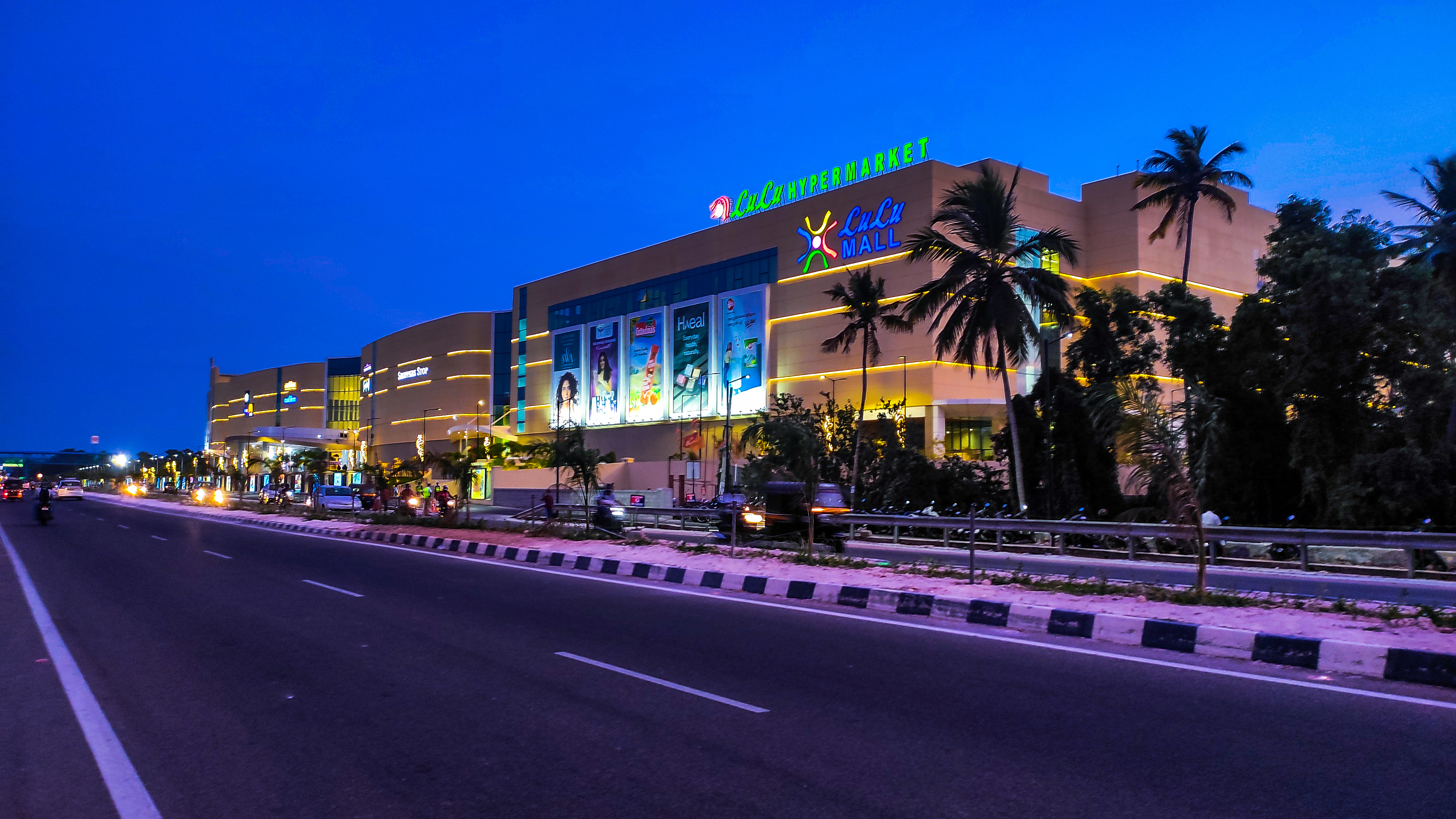
A highway at Thiruvananthapuram

Kerala has 331,904 kilometres (206,236 mi) of roads, which accounts for 5.6% of India's total. This translates to about 9.94 kilometres (6.18 mi) of road per thousand people, compared to an average of 4.87 kilometres (3.03 mi) in the country. Roads in Kerala include 1,812 kilometres (1,126 mi) of national highway; 1.6% of the nation's total, 4,342 kilometres (2,698 mi) of state highway; 2.5% of the nation's total, 27,470 kilometres (17,070 mi) of district roads; 4.7% of the nation's total, 33,201 kilometres (20,630 mi) of urban (municipal) roads; 6.3% of the nation's total, and 158,775 kilometres (98,658 mi) of rural roads; 3.8% of the nation's total. Most of Kerala's west coast is accessible through the NH 66 (previously NH 17 and 47); and the eastern side is accessible through state highways. New projects for hill and coastal highways were recently announced under KIIFB. National Highway 66, with the longest stretch of road (1,622 kilometres (1,008 mi)) connects Kanyakumari to Mumbai; it enters Kerala via Talapady in Kasargod and passes through Kannur, Kozhikode, Malappuram, Guruvayur, Kochi, Alappuzha, Kayamkulam, Kollam, Thiruvananthapuram before entering Tamil Nadu. Palakkad district is generally referred to as the Gateway of Kerala, due to the presence of the Palakkad Gap in the Western Ghats, through which the northern (Malabar) and southern (Travancore) parts of Kerala are connected to the rest of India via road and rail. The state's largest checkpoint, Walayar, is on NH 544, in the border town between Kerala and Tamil Nadu, through which a large amount of public and commercial transportation reaches the northern and central districts of Kerala. Kottayam has the maximum length of roads among the districts of Kerala, while Wayanad accounts for minimum.

== Distribution of roads ==
Agency-wise by distribution

Name of Department/Agency	Length (KM)	Percentage
Panchayats	265421.120	80.05
Kerala PWD (R&B)	31811.601	9.59
Kerala PWD (National Highways Wing)	548	0.17
Municipalities	18411.870	5.55
Corporation	6644	2.00
Forests	4575.770	1.38
Irrigation	2611.900	0.79
National Highways† (NHAI)	1233.5	0.37
Others (Railways, KSEB)	328	0.10
Total	331587.761	100.00

_{†NHAI maintains 1233.5 km and Kerala PWD (NH) section maintains rest of the National Highways from direction of MoRTH}

== National highways ==
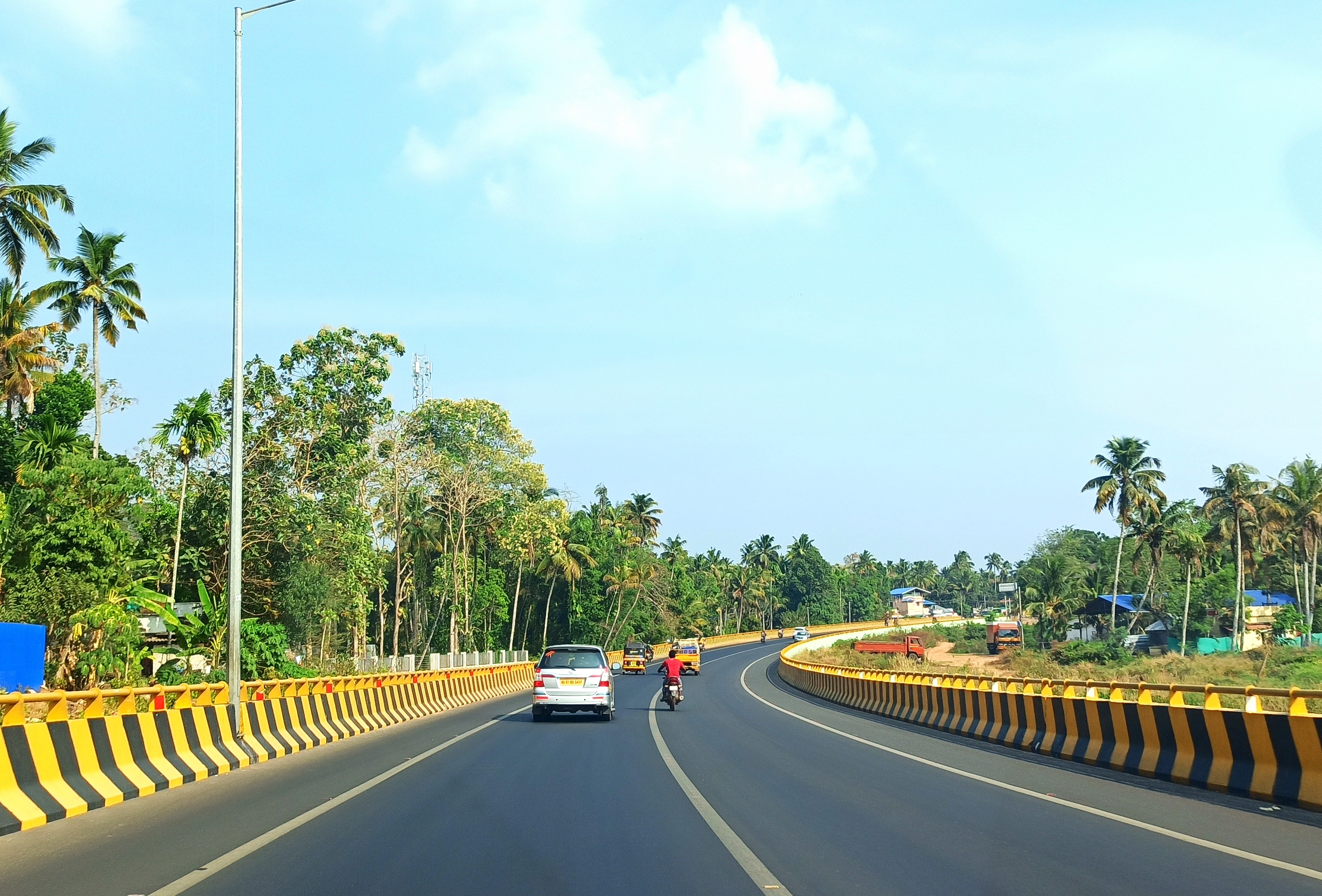
NH-66 Kollam Bypass near Kadavoor

Kerala has eight National Highways which run for about 1811.52 km. Kerala has narrower National Highways compared to other parts of India. Kerala is the only state, other than Goa, which has requested for narrower highways in the state. NHAI upgrades highways to a minimum 4-lane, 60-meter-wide, grade-separated highway or a better standard across India. But in Kerala, National Highways are being upgraded to 45-meter-wide highways. Previous Kerala State Government had requested the NHAI to reduce the width of National highways in the state to 30-meters, although neighbouring Karnataka and Tamil Nadu are upgrading their National Highways as 60-meters or more wider highways, with futuristic provision for 6/8-lane highway. The reason cited by the State Government was the difficulty and disinterest in Land Acquisition, which is the responsibility of the State Government. NHAI had stopped working on many of the highway widening/upgrade projects as there are opposition from the local population for highway widening. Among Kerala's districts, Ernakulam has the maximum length of National Highway, which accounts for 172.76 km. Wayanad has the minimum length of National Highway in Kerala.

Government has taken steps to develop the NH 66 (Kasargod to Thiruvananthapuram) into six lane. But, proposed six lane highways with 45 m Right of Way in Kerala will not have the wide medians to help the trucks and large vehicles to take the U-Turn without blocking the high speed traffic, which is a common feature in other parts of India. Wider median also helps to block the opposite side vehicle headlamp with plants.

=== Six-laning of National Highways in Kerala ===
Kerala's first four lane National Highway is the NH 66 stretch between Cherthala and Aroor and first six lane National Highway is the NH 544 stretch between Thrissur and Vadakkencherry. Kerala's first and biggest six lane tunnel highway is also on this stretch at Kuthiran. It is the part of Kochi -Thrissur-Palakkad- Walayar stretch of NH 544.

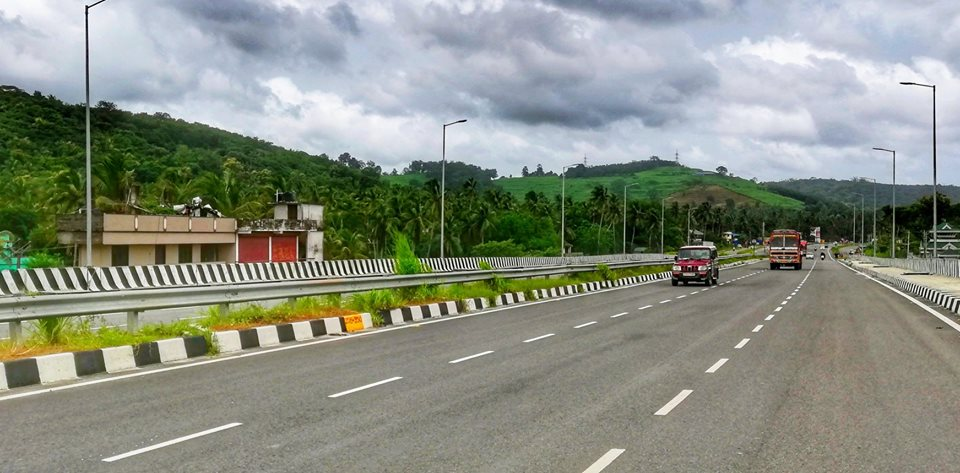
NH-544 Six lane Thrissur - Vadakkencherry

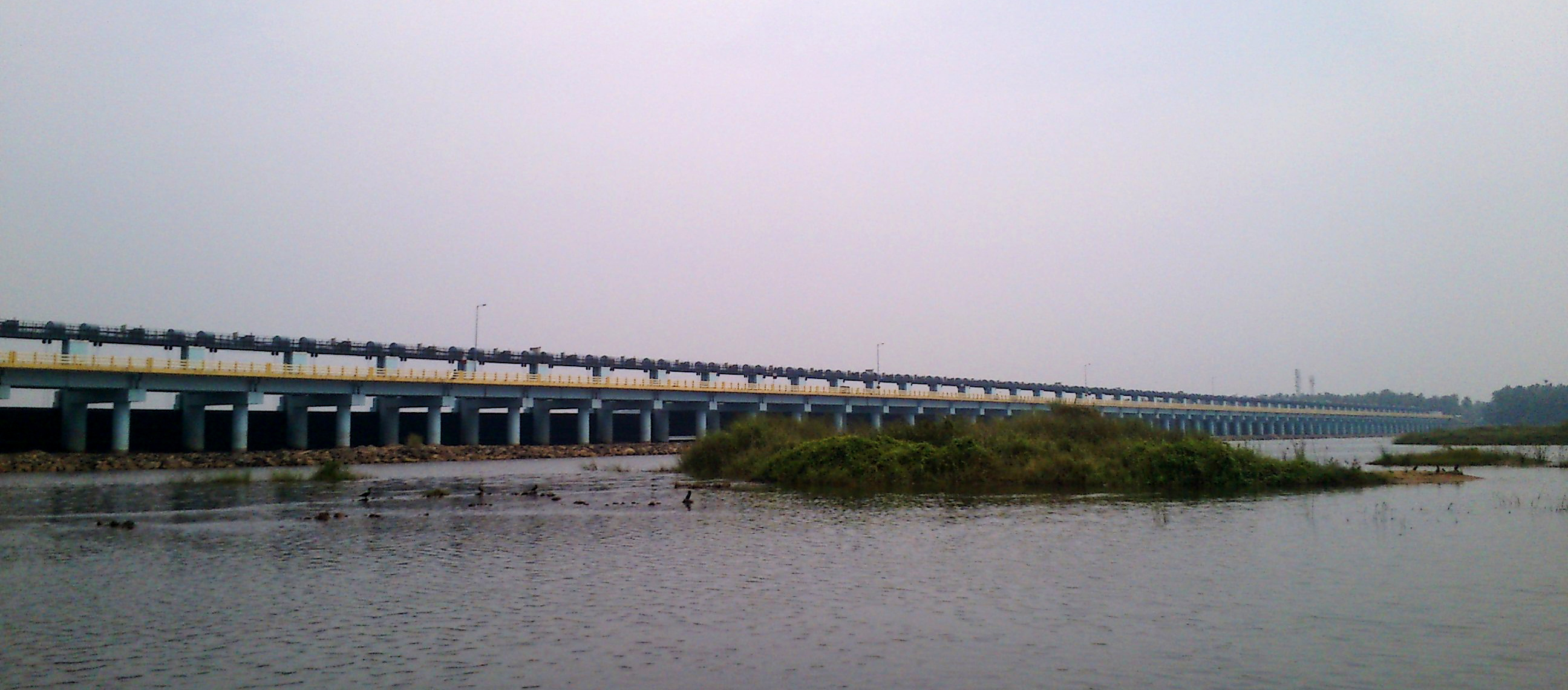
Chamravattom Regulator-cum-Bridge at Ponnani, Malappuram, the largest Regulator-cum-bridge in the state, is built over the river Bharathappuzha

Bharatmala Pariyojana has identified 418 km of national highway and State highway stretches in Kerala. Keeping in view a futuristic approach, it has been decided that the land for any 4/6-lane highway road will be acquired with a right of way (RoW) of 60 m irrespective of the width of the carriageway.

Kerala has not been allocated Greenfield 8-lane access-controlled expressways like other south Indian states as part of Bharatmala Pariyojana, as many brownfield projects of NHDP projects have still not started.

The Palakkad—Thrissur—Kochi stretch of NH 544 is a part of North-South and East-West Corridor of the Indian highway system. Due to the previous land acquisition crisis, NHAI had also stopped the feasibility study of the project under NHDP–Phase-III scheme in the stretch of NH 66 earlier, but has begun again after the strict demand of present Chief Minister. There was a proposal for construction of standalone ring road/bypasses around Thiruvananthapuram City under NHDP Phase VII.

S.No.	New NH No.	NHDP Phase	Agency	OSM Relation	Route	Length (km.)
1	NH 66	NHDP–Phase-III	NHAI	5828181	Thalappady-Kannur-Kozhikode- valanchery-Ernakulam-Kayamkulam-Kollam-Thiruvananthapuram-Parassala	669.437
2	NH 544	NHDP–Phase-II	NHAI	5804290	Walayar-Thrissur-Ernakulam	160
3	NH 85	NHDP–Phase-IV	Kerala PWD	5830968	Bodimettu - Kundannoor, Ernakulam	167.61
4	NH 183	NHDP–Phase-IV	Kerala PWD	11548489	Kollam-Anchalumoodu-Kundara-Chengannur-Kottayam-Kanjirapalli-Peermade-Kumily	190.3
5	NH 183A	New NH	Kerala PWD	5830954	Kollam Titanium Jn.-Sasthamkotta-Pathanamthitta-Perunad-Gavi-Vandiperiyar	145
6	NH 185	New NH	Kerala PWD	5830973	Adimali -Cheruthoni- Painavu -Kumily NH 183	98
7	NH 744	NHDP–Phase-IV	Kerala PWD	5804338	Kollam - Punalur -Aryankavu	81.28
8	NH 766	NHDP–Phase-IV	Kerala PWD	5828352	Kozhikode - Muthanga	117.6
9	NH 866	NHDP- Phase VII	NHAI		Thiruvananthapuram Outer Ring Road	80
10	NH 966	NHDP–Phase-IV	Kerala PWD	5828374	Ramanattukara - Palakkad	125.304
11	NH 966A	Port Connectivity	NHAI	5828385	Kalamassery - Vallarpadam	17
12	NH 966B	Port Connectivity	NHAI	5828387	Kundannoor - Willington Island	5.92
-	-			-	Total	1811.52 km

== State highways ==
Longest State highway in Kerala View at OpenStreetMap

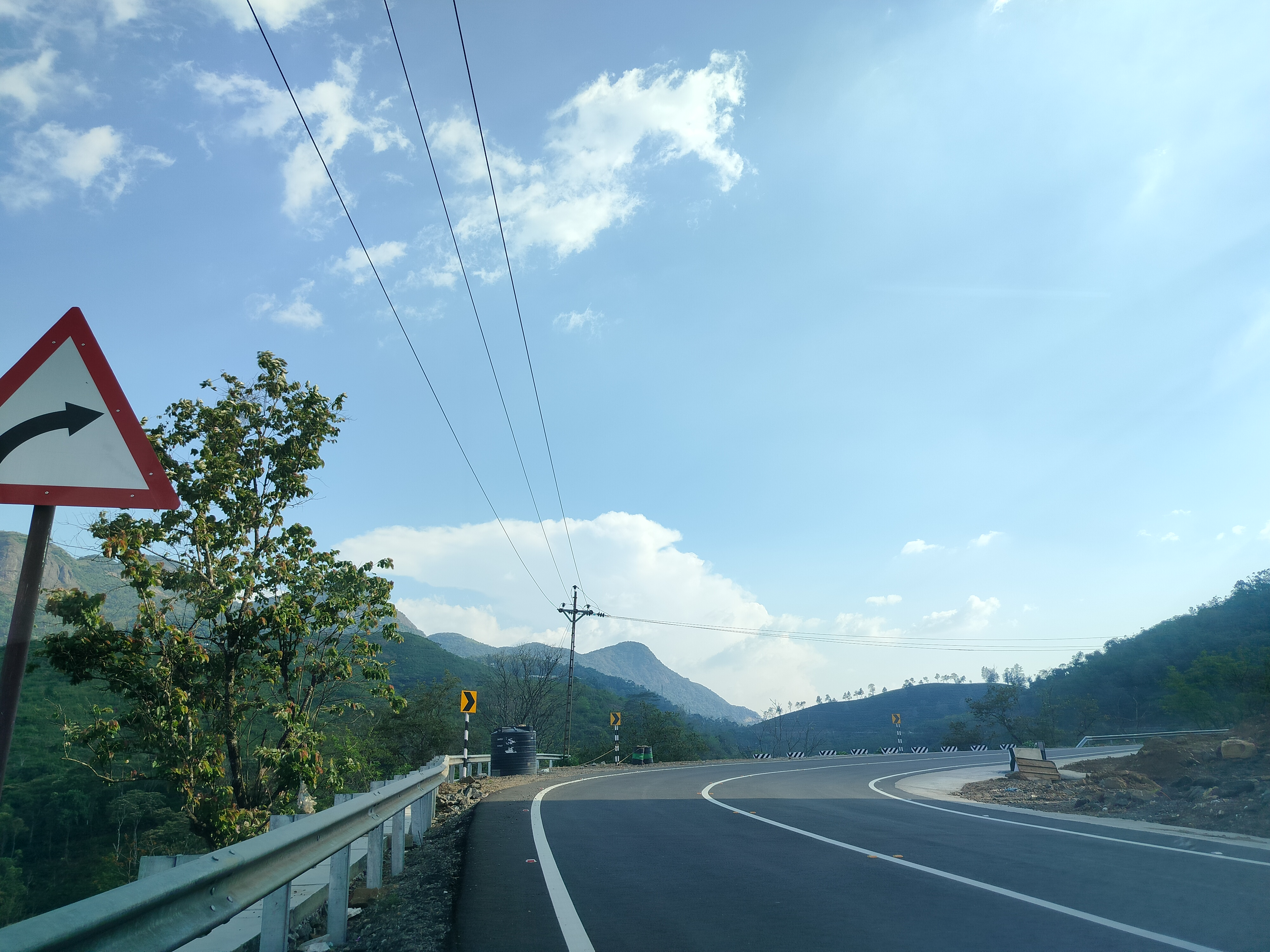
Kuttikkanam-Elappara State Highway

There are 83 state highways in Kerala. Of them, MC Road (Main-Central Road), proposed Hill Highway (Kerala) and Main Eastern Highway are the largest. The respective State Highway number is displayed on the top of all milestones (black in colour in green background) on the respective road.

The State Road Improvement Project (SRIP) envisages to improve and upgrade 1200 km of State Highways and Major District Roads to enhance the capacity and riding quality with proper maintenance plan, road safety and reducing the expenditure on periodic maintenance. The project is implemented by Road Infrastructure Company Kerala (RICK) Ltd. Road Infrastructure Company Kerala Limited (RICK) was incorporated in March 2012 as a Special Purpose Vehicle with paid up capital contributed by Government of Kerala (51%) and Kerala Road Fund Board (49%). About 29 road sections totalling to a length of 469 km has identified for rehabilitation improvements by the company. Rehabilitation project include strengthening/reconstruction of pavement/structure, junction improvements, provision of road furniture, bus bay byes and other traffic management measures. The company plans to upgrade 32 roads of 644 km. Upgrades involve widening the carriageway with paved shoulder (1.5 m on either side), widening of narrow CD works, geometric improvements, junction improvements, identifying the grade separation requirements, etc.

Sustainable and Planned Effort to Ensure Infrastructure Development (SPEEID) KERALA - Kerala government have formulated the project of constructing flyovers, bridges and roads at selected areas in the state in order to reduce the increasing traffic congestion. The project named as ‘SPEEID KERALA’ comprises 23 projects at the estimated cost of `10,000 Crore. The Kerala Road Fund Board (KRFB), the special purpose vehicle under the PWD, had been entrusted with the task of mobilizing funds for the projects. Work of 5 projects are in progress.

The Kerala State Transport Project, costing 336 million US dollars (Rs 1612 crores) - of which World Bank financing is US $255 million (Rs 1224 crores) and State's contribution is US $79.00 million(Rs 388 crores), aims to improve traffic flow and road safety on Kerala State's primary road network, and to strengthen the institutional and financial capacity of Kerala's key transport sector agencies. The KSTP was designed to upgrade 581 km and cover 1000 km under maintenance in two Phases. However, due to several reasons including delay in land acquisition, only 254 km of Phase I road was upgraded and maintenance works for 1180 km were carried out from June 2002 and December 2009. The KSTP phase 2 envisages upgrading 363 km of SH and MDR, Road Safety Management and Institutional Strengthening of PWD. The total Project cost is 445 million USD out of which 216 million USD is loan assistance from World Bank.

District-wise SH length of roads

Sl.No	Name of District	State Highways
1	Thiruvananthapuram	180.36
2	Kollam	123.79
3	Alappuzha	170.841
4	Pathanamthitta	249.194
5	Kottayam	406.531
6	Idukki	998.372
7	Ernakulam	325.206
8	Thrissur	374.033
9	Palakkad	245.987
10	Malappuram	374.764
11	Kozhikode	377.173
12	Wayanad	128.955
13	Kannur	244.665
14	Kasaragode	141.78
	Total†	4341.651

_{†Maintained by PWD (R&B) as on 31-3-2015}

== Major District Road ==
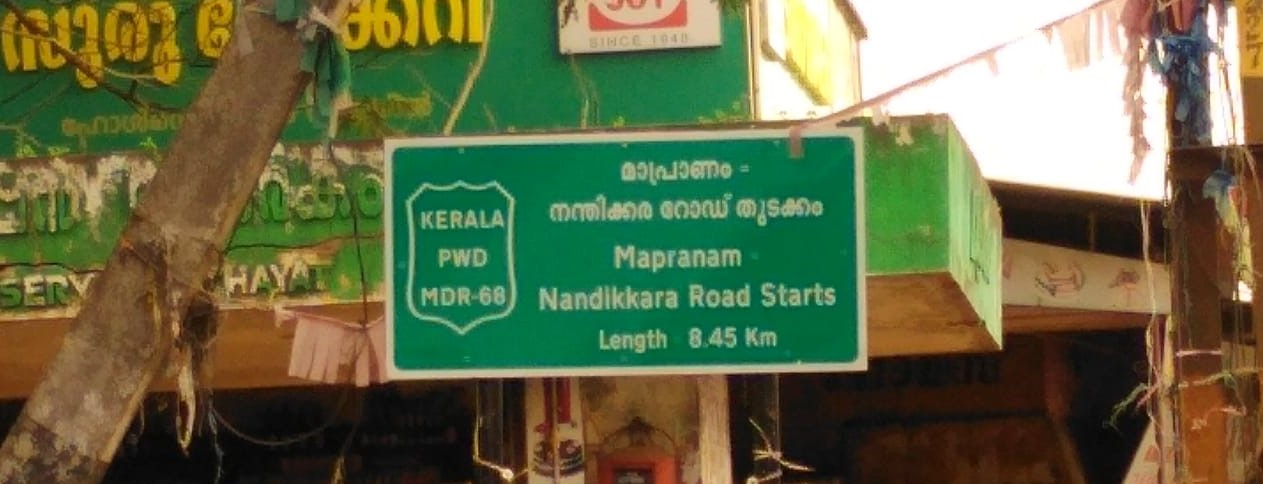
Kerala Major District Road

Major district roads (MDRs) are interconnecting major towns and economic centers within a district. They are developed and maintained by the Kerala State Public Works Department. The PWD (Roads Wing) is tasked with the matters of MDRs & SH.

District-wise MDR length of roads
District		Major District Road (MDR) in km	
District wise map of Kerala	Name	Length	MDR per 10,000 people
	Kasaragod	1460.66	11.2
	Kannur	2265.24	9.0
	Wayanad	1029.31	12.6
	Kozhikode	2454.64	8.0
	Malappuram	2680.15	6.5
	Palakkad	2184.7	7.8
	Thrissur	2064.21	6.6
	Ernakulam	3085.28	9.4
	Idukki	2867.36	25.9
	Kottayam	3456.2	17.5
	Alappuzha	2031.4	9.6
	Pathanamthitta	1472.33	12.3
	Kollam	2202.86	8.4
	Thiruvananthapuram	2557.74	7.8
	Total†	31812.1	9.5

_{†Maintained by PWD (R&B) as in 2019-20}

== City roads ==
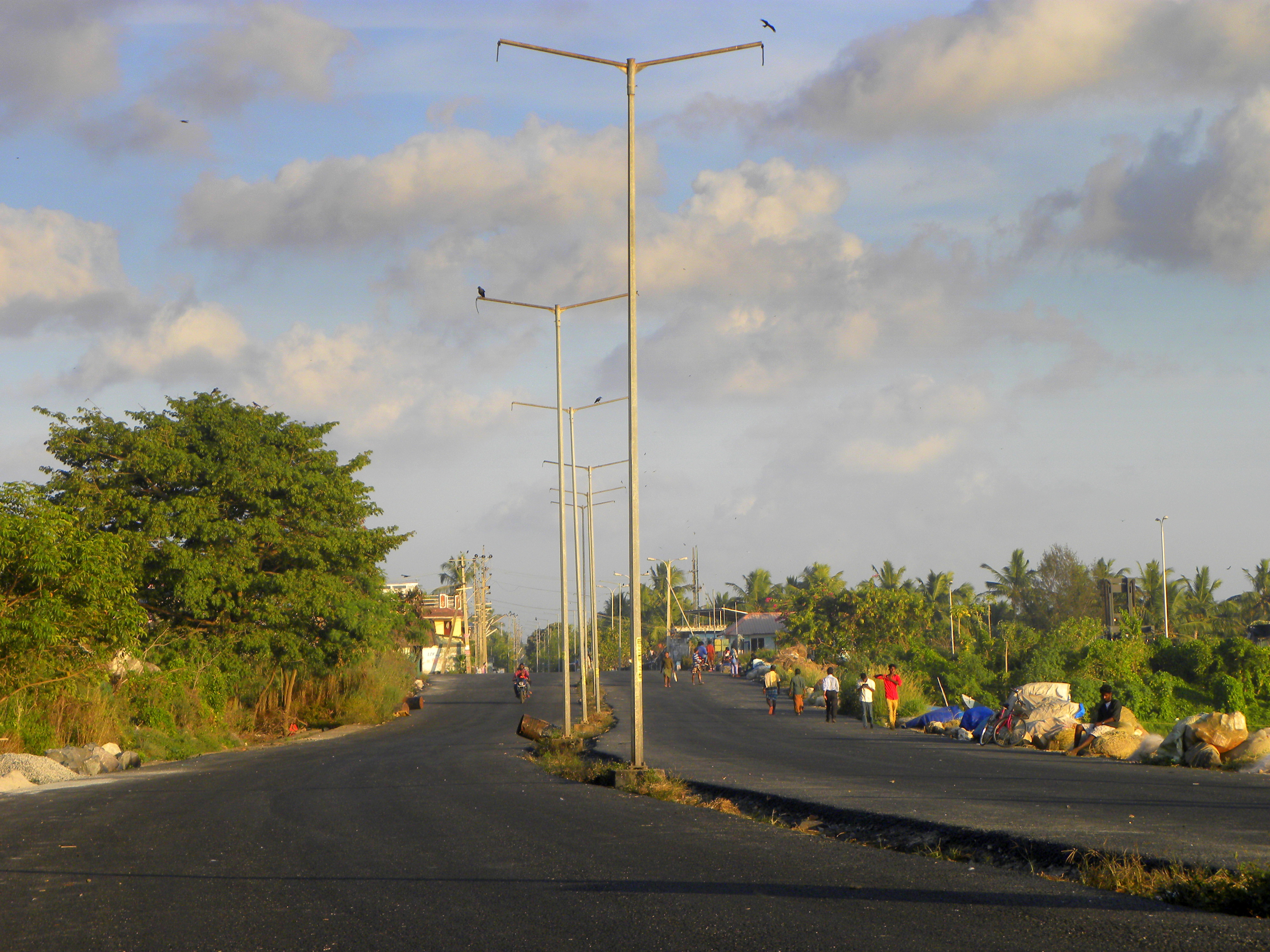
Port Road - A major city road in Kollam

The government is planning to improve all the major city roads in Kerala. Roads in Thiruvananthapuram, Kollam, Alappuzha, Kottayam, Kozhikode, Malappuram and Punalur city roads will get some major facelifts through this project. Check the roads in kerala videos here.

== Stakeholders ==
- Kerala Public Works Department (PWD) - The main state government agency concerned with the development and maintenance of State Highways, Major District Roads, certain portions of National Highways, and other important roads in Kerala.
- National Highway Authority of India (NHAI)- The NHAI under Ministry of Road Transport and Highways, Government of India is responsible for the development and maintenance of National Highways in Kerala.
- Local self government institutions- The local bodies such as Gram Panchayats, Block Panchayats and District Panchayats responsible for development and maintenance of rural roads and municipalities and corporations for urban roads.

== Proposed or under construction roads ==
- Kochi–Theni Greenfield Highway
- Angamaly–Kundannoor Bypass
- Thiruvananthapuram–Kasaragod Coastal Highway
- Thiruvananthapuram–Angamaly Greenfield Highway
- Thiruvananthapuram–Kasaragod Hill Highway
- Outer Ring Road, Thiruvananthapuram
- Palakkad–Kozhikode Greenfield Highway
- Malappuram- Mysore Economic corridor

== See also ==
- Kerala Infrastructure Investment Fund Board
- Economy of Kerala
