= Hill Highway =

Proposed state highway in Kerala, India

State Highway 59
- SH-59
- SH 59 highlighted in red
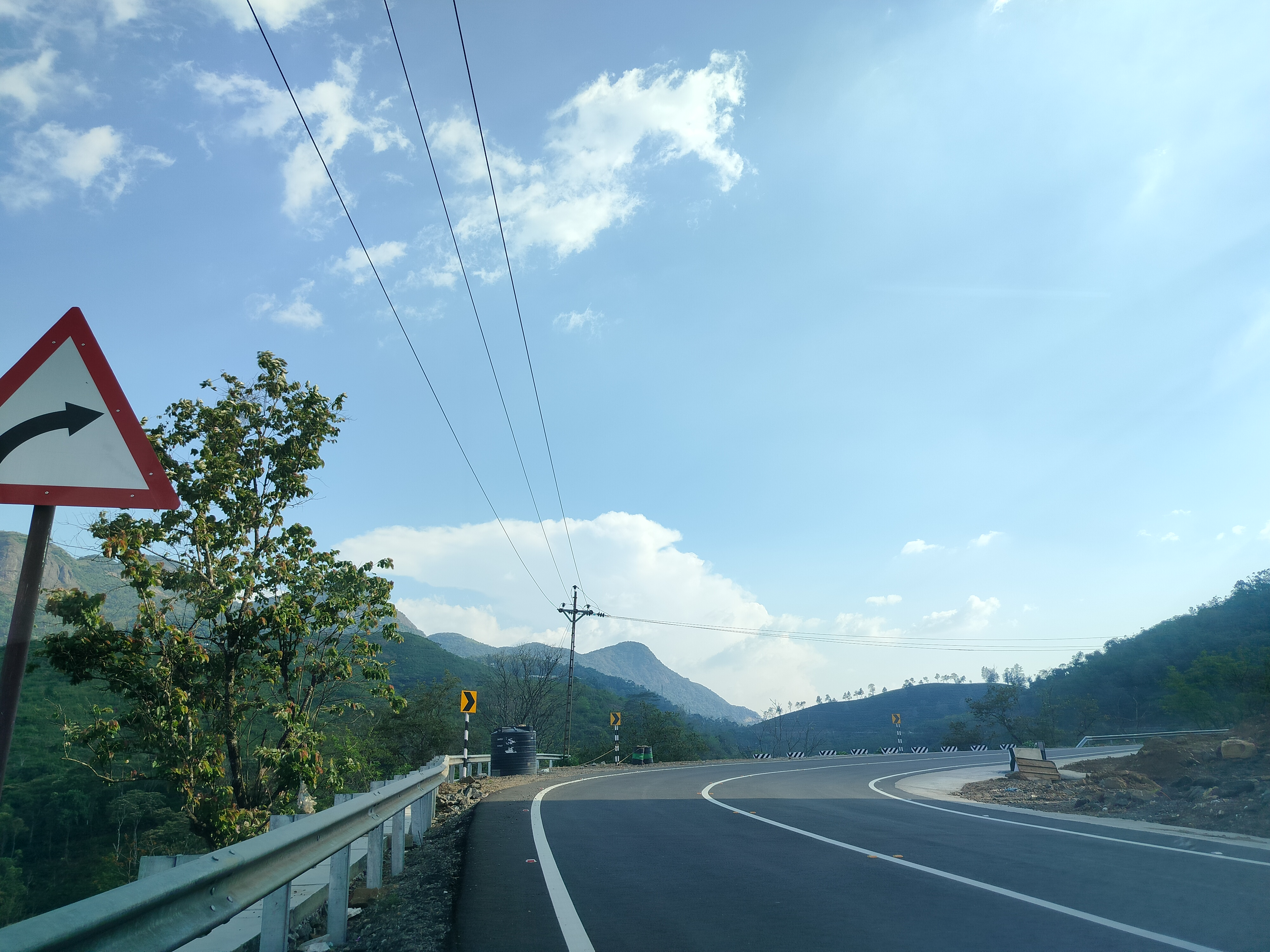

Route information
- Maintained by Kerala Public Works Department
- Length: 1,332.16 km (827.77 mi)

Major junctions
- North end: Nandarapadavu
- SH 56 in Pathinettam Mile; SH 30 in Vallithode; NH 766 in Kalpetta; SH 29 in Meppadi; SH 28 / SH 39 in Nilambur; NH 544 in Palakkad; SH 58 in Kollengode; SH 21 in Vettilappara; NH 85 / SH 16 in Neriamangalam; SH 19 in Myladumpara; SH 40 / SH 41 in Nedumkandam; SH 33 in Puliyanmala; NH 183 in Kuttikkanam; NH 744 in Punalur; SH 2 in Kulathupuzha; SH 45 in Vithura; SH 3 in Aryanad
- South end: NH 66 in Parassala

Location
- Country: India
- State: Kerala
- Districts: Kasaragod, Kannur, Wayanad, Kozhikode, Malappuram, Palakkad, Thrissur, Ernakulam, Idukki, Kottayam, Pathanamthitta, Kollam, Thiruvananthapuram

Highway system
- Roads in India; Expressways; National; State; Asian; State Highways in Kerala
← SH 58	→ SH 60

The Thiruvananthapuram–Kasaragod Hill Highway or State Highway 59 (SH-59) or Malayora Highway as it is known in the state of Kerala is a proposed state highway. Upon completion, it will be the longest highway in Kerala, extending from Nandarapadavu in Kasaragod district to Parassala in Thiruvananthapuram district, at a length of 1332.16 km. The highway will pass through 13 of the 14 districts, the exception being Alappuzha as that district is not part of the hilly ranges of Kerala.

The highway which is under early stages of construction would pass through areas including Bandadka, Malom, Chittarikkal, Cherupuzha, Alakode, Payyavoor, Ulikkal, Kelakam, Mananthavady, Kalpetta, Thiruvambady, Nilambur, Karuvarakundu, Edakkara, Palakkad, Pattikkad, Neriamangalam, Kattappana, Mundakayam, Erumely, Ranni, Konni, Koodal, Pathanapuram, Punalur, Anchal, Kulathupuzha, Madathara, Palode, Vithura, Aryanadu, Vellarada etc. This highway will pass through 13 out of the 14 districts in Kerala state. Between Kannur and Malappuram districts, this highway will have two parallel routes, one through Wayanad district and another through Kozhikode district.

Development of highway-59 in Kerala is proposed in two phases. First phase involved selection of most feasible route between Kasaragod and Palakkad Districts. The National Transportation Planning and Research Centre(NATPAC) has already undertaken detailed investigation and finalised the alignment for Phase I of Hill Highway. Implementation of the same is in progress in the northern region of Kerala. In the second stage possible alternative routes for developing into Hill Highway between Palakkad and Thiruvananthapuram Districts are identified. Field studies and environmental screening of the project were completed and NATPAC submitted the report to Government on 21-05-2009. Government have approved the alignment on 6-7-2009 and issued Government order vide GO (MS) No.44/2009/PWD dated 6-7-2009. It is also called as "Kerala's Spice route"

== Complete alignment ==
Sl.No	District	Alignment	Length	Remarks
1	Kasaragod	Stretch 1 Nandarapadav - Chevar Nandarapadavu, Sunkathakatte, Majarpalla,Morathana, Miyapadavu, Paivalike, Chevar Stretch 2 Chevar - Edapparambu Chevar, Permude, Angadimogaru, Puthige, Idiyadukka (Perla), Badiyadka, Mulleria, Padiyathadukka, Athanadi, Edapparamba Stretch 3 Edapparambu - Kolichal Edapparamba, Pandi, Pallanchi, Sankarambadi, Paduppu, Bandadka, Manadukkam, Kolichal Stretch 4 Kolichal - District boundary near Cherupuzha. Kolichal, Pathinettam Mile, Chully, Malom, Chittarikkal	128 km	
2	Kannur	Cherupuzha, Therthally, Alakode, Karuvanchal, Naduvil, Chemperi, Payyavoor, Ulikkal, Vallithode, Anappanthy, Karikkottakary, Edoor, Aralam, Kappukadavu, Perumbunna, Madapurachal, Manathana, Kanichar, Kelakam, Kottiyoor, Ambayathode, Boy's Town (continues to Wayanad district)	109 km	
3	Kozhikode	Stretch 1 Chunkakutty - Kakkadampoyil Thottilppalam, Mullankunnu, Chavaramuzhi Bridge, Peruvannamuzhi, Chakkittapara, Koorachundu, Kallanod, Thalayad, Kattippara, Malapuram, Kodanchery, Nellipoyil, Pulloorampara, Koodaranji, Kakkadampoyil Stretch 2 Marippuzha - Pulloorampara Wayanad Tunnel - Muthappanpuzha - Anakkampoyil - Pulloorampara	110 km	
4	Wayanad	Stretch 1 Boy's Town, Mananthavady, Panamaram, Kalpetta, Meppadi, Kalladi Wayanad Tunnel Stretch 2 Boy's Town - Valad - Niravilpuzha - Pakramthalam Churam	96 km	
5	Malappuram	Akampadam, Nilambur, Pookkottumpadam, Kalikavu, Karuvarakundu,Melattur, Ucharakkadavu	101 km	
6	Palakkad	Kanjirampara, Alanallur, Bheemanad, Kottopadam, Kumaram, Puttur, Mannarkadu, Chandranagar (Palakkad Town), Kalligal, Puthunagaram, Kollenkode, Nenmara, Vadakkenchery	130 km	
7	Thrissur	Pattikkad, Kannara, Vilangannoor, Mannamangalam, Pulikkanny, Palappilly, Nayattukundu, Vellikulangara, Randukai, Vettilappara	60 km	
8	Ernakulam	Vettilappara, Adivaram, Kadappara, Ellithodu, Chettinada, Pannamkuzhi, Payal, Kottapadi, Chelladu, Ughipara, Nadukani, Neriamangalam, Arrammile Elamblassery	104 km	
9	Idukki	Kurathikudi, Perubankuth, Mankulam, Kallar, Eruttukanam, Kunchithanny, Rajakkad, Thinkalkadu, Myladumpara, Nedumkandam, Puliyanmala, Kattappana, Elappara, Kuttikkanam, Mundakayam	166 km	
10	Kottayam	Mundakayam, Erumely, Placheri	24 km	
11	Pathanamthitta	Ranni, Kumbazha, Konni, Koodal	46 km	
12	Kollam	Pathanapuram, Piravanthoor, Punalur, Karavaloor, Anchal, Kulathupuzha, Madathara,	64 km	
13	Thiruvananthapuram	Madathara, Palode, Thenoor, Vithura, Aryanad, Kuttichal, Amboori, Vellarada, Karakkonam, Parassala	75 km	

== History ==
The idea of a hill highway through Kasaragod district(then part of Kannur district) and nearby districts hill areas to improve market access of farmers was first mooted by Joseph Kanakamotta who formed Kasaragod District Hill Area Development Committee. He proposed the plan for a hill highway in 1960 and it didn't receive much support at initial years. In the District Development Council meeting held at Kannur in 1966 first approval for the project came through. In 1987 there was an announcement abandoning the project. However the Government of Kerala approved the project and funds were allocated for the same in 2005 and the same year on 17 January 2005, then Chief minister of Kerala Oommen Chandy inaugurated the first phase of the project between Kasaragod and Palakkad at a function held in Payyavoor.

== Status of progress ==
Finalizing alignment of the project and getting clearances from forest department faced huge delays. In September 2016 Detailed Project Report for just 79 km from proposed 1229 km was only completed. The project comprises 40 reaches and in 7 reaches it is planned with less than 12 metre width. As of 2020, works on 21 reaches spread across Thiruvananthapuram, Kollam, Kozhikode, Kannur, Kasaragod districts are in progress.

In March 2020, a 46 km stretch of hill highway in Kollam district between Punalur and Agasthyacode (near Anchal) and between Alencherry (near Anchal) and Challimukku (near Kollayil on Kollam - Thiruvananthapuram district border) got completed.

In August 2020, works on 35 km stretch of the highway in Kozhikode district between Kodencheri and Kakkadampoyil at a width of 12 m was inaugurated by Minister of Public Works Department. The works are done by Uralungal Labour Contract Co-operative Society. The works on Thottilpalam - Thalayad stretch is facing opposition from land owners.

The Detailed Project Report for project in Kasaragod district was submitted with a length of 128 km through the district in January 2018. As of August 2020, the works in first stretch of the project in Kasaragod district between Nandarapadavu and Chevar are nearing completion and works on other stretches are in progress. The project in district through Pandu Forest near Adoor (Kasaragod) delayed much due to approval from Forest department.

The works in Thiruvananthapuram district commenced in 2018 at Parassala constituency in two reaches Parassala - Kudappanamoodu Reach 1 and Kudappanamoodu - Paruthipalli reaches. As of 2020, the works on Reach 1 is stalled and works in Reach 2 is moving in a very slow pace. In 2021 February, the works on 15.7 km Reach-1 between Parassala - Kudappanamoodu was re-tendered since the contractor to whom it was awarded initially had died due to COVID-19 pandemic. The new contract was awarded to Uralungal Labour Contract Co-operative Society. The works on 7.85 km-long Kudappanamoodu -Kallikkad stretch and the 3.90 km-long Kallikkad-Paruthippally stretch commenced simultaneously. By 2023-2024, the stretch between Aryanadu and Parassala got completed.

In Wayanad district as of February 2021, the land acquisition from tea estates on a 13 km stretch between Meppadi and Chooralmala is pending. The part of hill highway connecting hill highway of Wayanad district with Malappuram district i.e. the Aranappuzha - Munderi stretch passes through forest 7 km of forest land. This area is ecologically sensitive and was impacted severely by 2019 Kerala floods and approval from Forest Department is still pending in this stretch.

== Advantages ==
The hill highway can benefit the hilly regions of Kerala immensely. It will help boost tourism, improve connectivity and transportation, easy market access to farmers from the hilly regions, relief measures during disasters etc. Though there are apprehensions that this project has ecological impacts, the benefits and value that it brings to people living in high range areas is tremendous. In Nilambur region it will help people access Mysore bypassing the Bandipur night travel ban through Mananthavady.

The highway has helped Tourism in hilly areas.

== Constraints ==
Few stretches of the highway passes through Eco-Sensitive Zone this creates risks of man-animal conflicts and vehicular pressure. There is lack of proper integration with road networks of neighboring states especially in Kasaragod district. There is a discontinuity between Hill Highway that terminates in Mangaluru District border at Vorkady and Ullal - Mudipu road.

== Budget support ==
No	Financial Year	Amount outlay (Rs)	Amount spend (Rs)
1	2012–13	Nil	Nil
2	2013–14	82.37 lakh	6.23 cr
3	2014–15	82.37 lakh	8.98 cr
4	2015–16	9.06 crore	7.35 cr

== See also ==
- Thiruvananthapuram–Kasaragod Coastal Highway
- List of state highways in Kerala
- Main Central Road
- Waterways transport in Kerala
