= State Highway 3 (Kerala) =

State highway in Kerala, India

State Highway 3
- SH 3 highlighted in red

Route information
- Maintained by Kerala Public Works Department
- Length: 37.5 km (23.3 mi)

Major junctions
- North end: SH 2, Nedumangad
- South end: SH 45 at TN border in Vellarada

Location
- Country: India
- State: Kerala
- Districts: Thiruvananthapuram

Highway system
- Roads in India; Expressways; National; State; Asian; State Highways in Kerala
← SH 2	→ SH 5

State Highway 3 (SH 3) is a State Highway in Kerala, India starting from Nedumangad and ends at Kadukkara near Kerala - Tamilnadu border. The highway is 37.5 km long and runs parallel to the Western Ghats and enters Tamil Nadu via Aralvaimozhi pass. It is made up partially by the existing Aralvaimozhi - Nedumangad royal state highway of Travancore. The road connects Nedumangad in Kerala and Aralvaimozhi in Tamil Nadu.

The stretch of this highway from Anappara near Vellarada till Aryanad is now part of Hill Highway (Kerala). This highway connects tourist destinations such as Koickal Palace Nedumangadu, Neyyar Dam, Neyyar Safari Park, Dravyappara, Thekkan Kurishumala, Elephant Rehabilitation Center Kottur, Chittar Dam and Thripparappu waterfalls.

This road is called as Nedumangad- Shorlacode Road by local people. Shorlacode is a small village near Kulasekaram nearby Perunchani Dam. These days people call it as Surulacode or Churulakode.

== Route description ==
Nedumangad Toll Jn - Uzhamalackal - Aryanadu - Kuttichal - Paruthipally - Kallikkad - Vazhichal -Kudappanamoodu - Vellarada- Kathipara Junction - Kadukkara - State boundary.

This road continues as State Highway 45 of Tamilnadu for another 48 km from Netta border (Kadukkara) of Tamilnadu via Thirparappu - Kulasekaram - Boothapandi to Aralvaimozhi.

== See also ==
- Roads in Kerala
- List of state highways in Kerala
