= Manakadavu =

Village in Kerala, India

Manakadavu is a village in Taliparamba taluk of Kannur district in the Indian state of Kerala, near Karnataka Forest. It is about 56 km from Kannur city. Nearest bus station in Taliparamba at 36 km

== Demographics ==
People here are almost in equal ratio of Hindu and Christians.

== Economy ==
Most people are engaged in agriculture and business. This area exports hill products viz Rubber, dry Copra, Black pepper etc. Manakkadavu is part of Udayagiri Panchayat in Taliparamba Block.

== Tourism ==
The nearest tourist place is Paithalmala. Nearest mountain range is surrounded by three hills — Kottathalachi, Olakettivana and Thirunettikallu. Kottathalachi Mount is a famous Christian pilgrim. Vayikkamba river in nearest Karnataka forest. Nearest please in manjappullu

== Transportation ==
The national highway passes through Taliparamba town. Goa and Mumbai can be accessed on the northern side and Cochin and Thiruvananthapuram can be accessed on the southern side. Taliparamba has a good bus station and buses are easily available to all parts of Kannur district. The road to the east of Iritty connects to Mysore and Bangalore. But buses to these cities are available only from Kannur, 22 km to the south. The nearest railway stations are Kannapuram and Kannur on Mangalore-Palakkad line. Trains are available to almost all parts of India subject to advance booking over the internet. There are airports at Kannur, Mangalore and Calicut. All of them are small international airports with direct flights available only to Middle Eastern countries.

== See also ==
- Pythalmala
- Karthikapuram
- Kappimala
- Alakode
