= Karthikapuram =

- Village
- Location in Kerala, India Karthikapuram (India)
- Coordinates: 12.2296°N 75.4825°E
- Country: India
- State: Kerala
- District: Kannur

Languages
  - Official: Malayalam, English
- Time zone: UTC+5:30 (IST)

Karthikapuram is a small town in Kannur district in the Indian state of Kerala. It is close to Karnataka border, and is located on the banks of Kuppam River.

== Demographics ==
Literacy rate among the population is high and the area is secular in nature. Even though some politicians tried to manipulate the communal harmony by dividing right wing people against others, people remain responsible towards fellow humans. Faiths followed include Christianity, Hinduism and Islam. Majority of the population migrated from the southern part of Kerala. There is a small population of indigenous people living in Karthikapuram who are the original people of the land.

== Economy ==
Most economic activity revolves around small farms and small businesses. Natural Rubber, coconut, and spices like ginger, black-pepper etc. are grown here. Educated and skilled residents typically migrate to bigger cities since the employment opportunities are low. Most of the youngsters are employed in outside of Kerala and in foreign countries in Middle East, North America and Europe.

== Administration ==
The village is part of Udayagiri panchayat under Taliparamba block. The panchayat office is located at Karthikapuram itself. The panchayat is governed by elected members and falls under Irikkur Assembly constituency and Kannur Lok Sabha constituency.

== Government offices ==
Grama panchayath office, KSEB office, post office and GHSS Karthikapuram school

== Health care ==
The nearest government hospital available is the government hospital near to Karthikapuram town. The hospital has facility to hold patients over nights and doctor services during the day. A homeopathy clinic is available in town and doctor consultation is only limited to business hours.

== Religious centers ==
Karthikapuram has a Syro Malabar Catholic church and a Hindu temple near to the town.

== Transportation ==
The national highway passes through Taliparamba town. Goa and Mumbai can be accessed on the northern side and Cochin and Thiruvananthapuram can be accessed on the southern side. Taliparamba has a good bus station and buses are easily available to all parts of Kannur district. The road to the east of Iritty connects to Mysore and Bangalore. But buses to these cities are available only from Kannur, 22 km to the south. The kannur airport is the closest airport.The nearest railway stations are Kannapuram and Kannur on Mangalore-Palakkad line. Trains are available to almost all parts of India subject to advance booking over the internet. There are airports at Kannur, Mangalore and Calicut. All of them are small international airports with direct flights available only to Middle Eastern countries.

== See also ==
- Udayagiri
- Paithalmala
- Kappimala
- Alakode
- Palakayam Thattu (Kannur)
