= Naduvil =

- Town
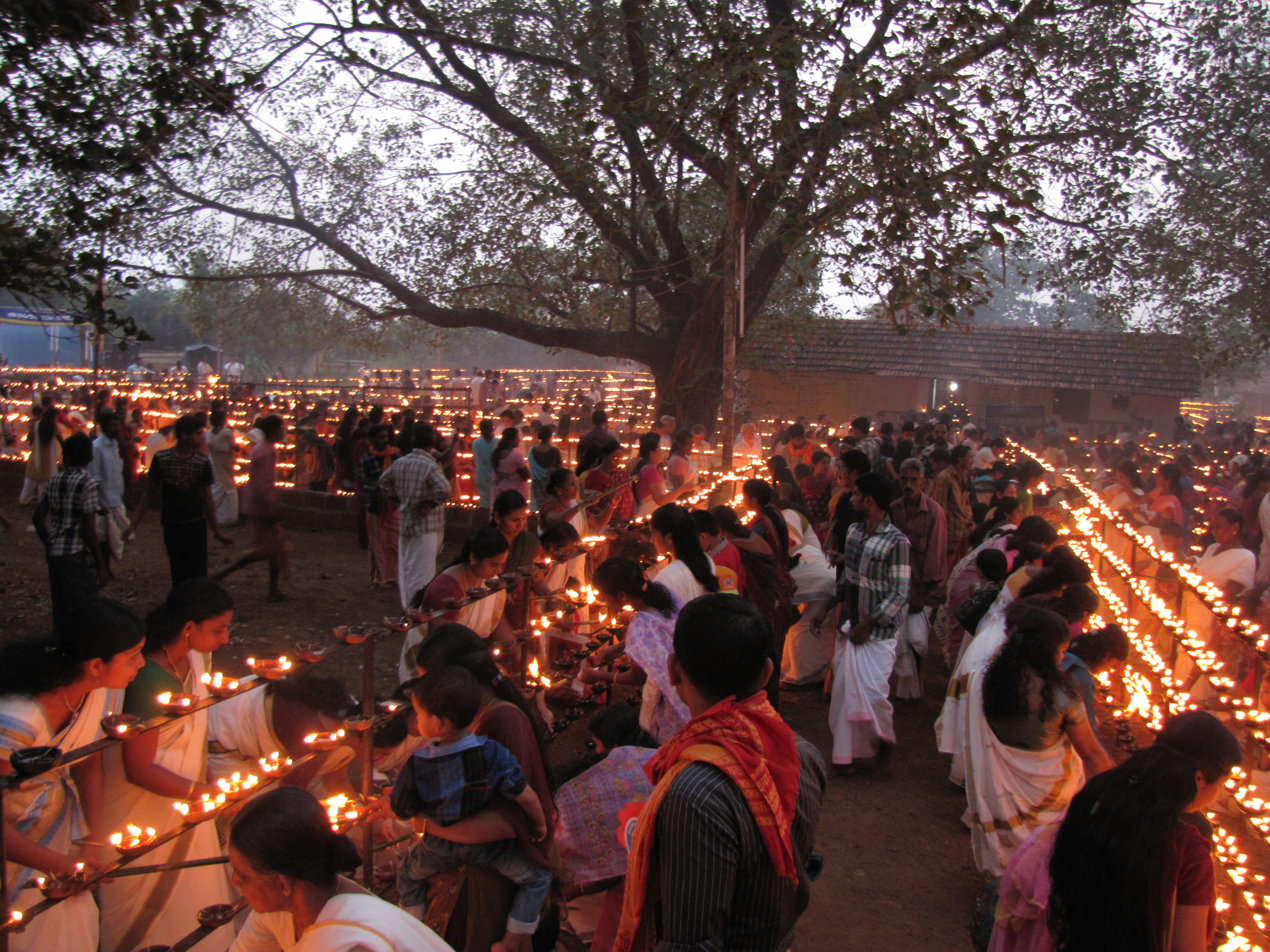
- Light festival at Ayyappa Temple, Naduvil

- Location in Kerala, India Naduvil (India)
- Coordinates: 12.1216°N 75.4829°E
- Country: India
- State: Kerala
- District: Kannur
- Taluk: Taliparamba

Government
  - Type: Panchayati Raj (India)
  - Body: Naduvil Grama Panchayat

Area
  - Total: 49.31 km^{2} (19.04 sq mi)
- Elevation: 159 m (522 ft)

Population (2011)
  - Total: 20,369
  - Density: 413.1/km^{2} (1,070/sq mi)

Languages
  - Official: Malayalam, English
- Time zone: UTC+5:30 (IST)
- PIN: 670582
- ISO 3166 code: IN-KL
- Vehicle registration: KL 59
- Assembly constituency: Irikkur
- Lok Sabha constituency: Kannur

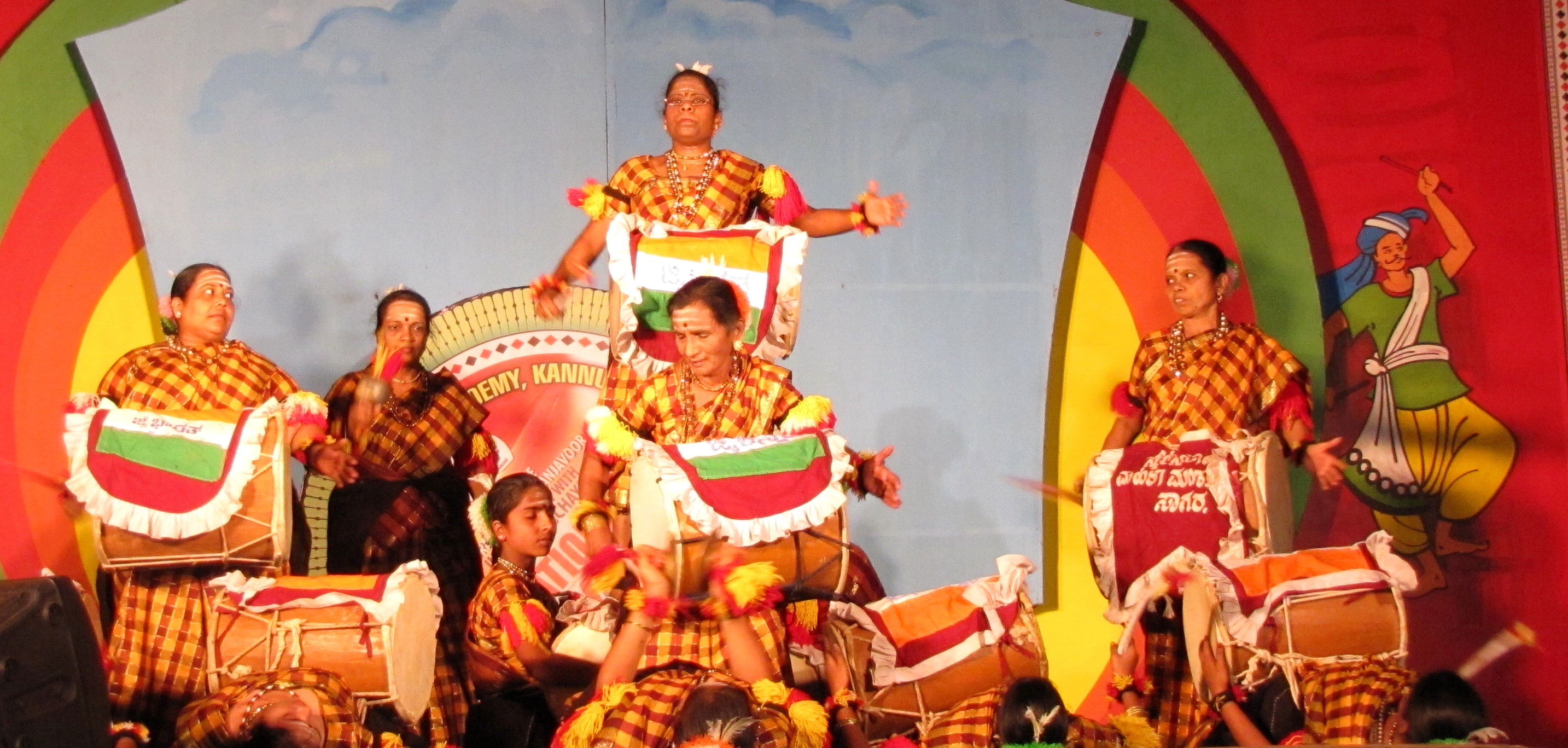
National Folk Festival, Naduvil

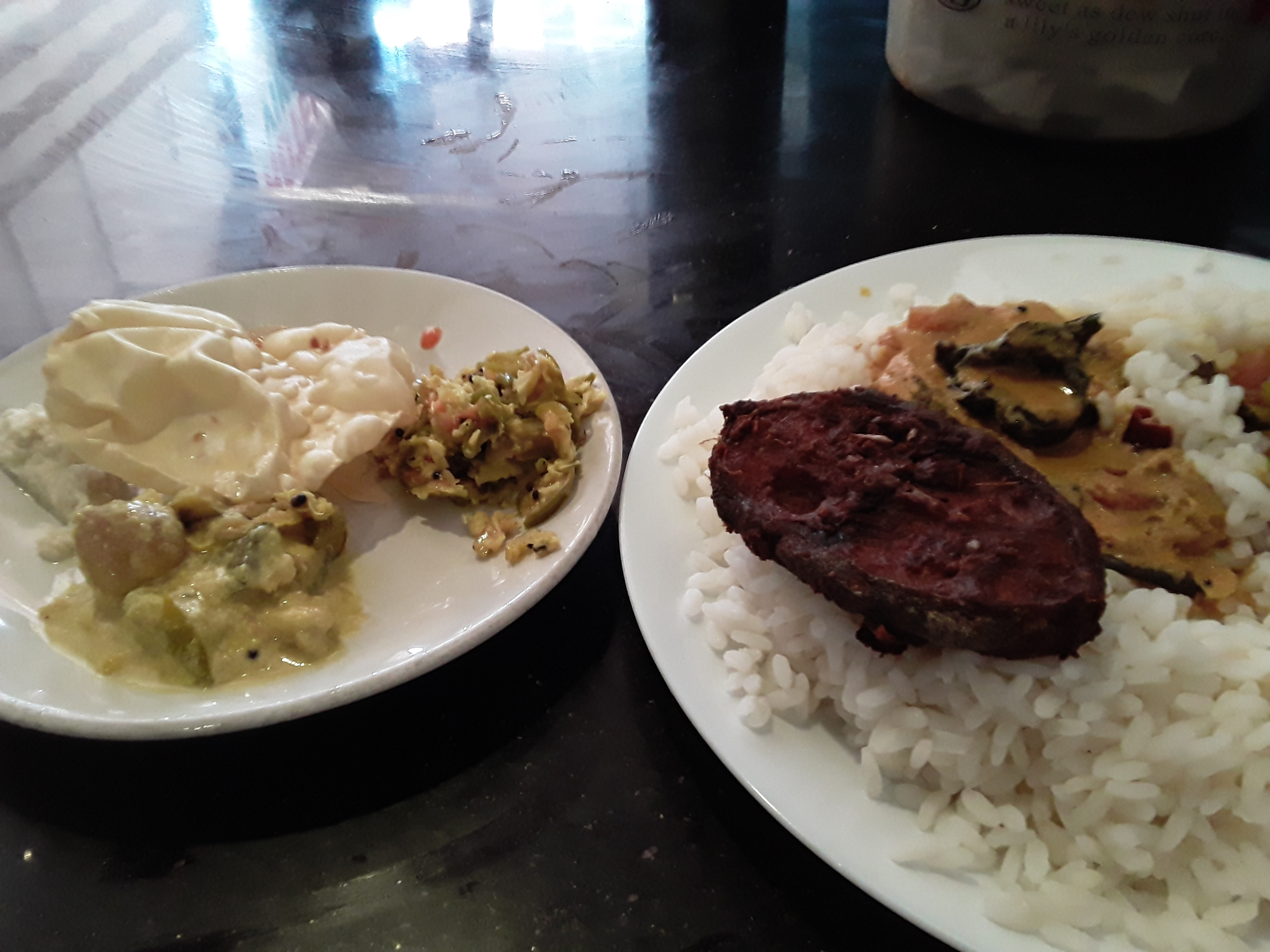
Lunch at Naduvil

Naduvil is a small town in Kannur district in the Indian State of Kerala. The town is the headquarters of Naduvil Grama Panchayat.New Naduvil revenue village is part of Taliparamba taluk.

Paithalmala is a hill station and tourist attraction near Naduvil. Paithalmala is located at the border of Kerala and Karnataka. The Kodagu district of Karnataka is at the eastern side of Paithalmala.

It was one of the major centers of Syrian Christian migration (Malabar migration). Migration of mainly Syrian Christian families to Kudiyanmala started in the 1950s and continued until the 1970s.

== Etymology ==
The name Kudiyanmala has a history behind it. The ruler of the Chirakkal Principality had a sister, who was accused of adultery. Accompanied by servants she was sent to Kudiattivalappu. Kudiattivalappu is located in Kudiyanmala, which is near Pottamplavu. Every 12 years Vyazhavattam, the ruler sent soldiers to kill the sons of the princess if any were born during this period. From this legend, the name Kudiyanmala was derived.

Malabar Migration which initially started in the 1920s and reached a peak in the 1950s began changing the demography from the 1950s. World War II created poverty in Travancore, which caused migration. Central Travancore, especially Kottayam district, was the focus of migration. In 1953, the Holy Mass was said for the first time in the history of this place.

== Demographics ==
As of 2011 Census, New Naduvil village had a population of 20,369 which includes 9,878 males and 10,491 females. Naduvil village has an area of 49.31 km^{2} (19.04 sq mi) with 4,926 families residing in it. In Naduvil, 10.3% of the population was under 6 years of age. New naduvil had overall literacy of 93.8% which constitutes male literacy of 95.8% and female literacy of 91.9%.

Naduvil Grama Panchayat comprises of New Naduvil and Vellad revenue villages. The total population of the panchayat was 31,190, which consists 15,280 males and 15,910 females. The total number of households were 7,524. The population in the age group 0-6 were 3,169 (10.16%), among which 1,627 are males and 1,542 females. The total number of literates were 26,384 (94.1%) where male literates are 13,089 (95.87%) and female literates are 13,295 (92.53%).

== Administration ==
Naduvil Grama Panchayat is divided into 20 wards, where elections are held for every five years. As of the 2025 Kerala local elections, the current ruling party is UDF, who won 14 out of the 20 wards. Naduvil grama panchayat is part of Taliparamba block panchayat and falls under Irikkur Assembly constituency and Kannur Lok Sabha constituency.

=== Ward list ===
Naduvil Grama Panchayat comprises of the following 20 wards.

Ward no.	Name	Ward no.	Name
1	Karuvanchal	2	Kaniyanchal
3	Vellad	4	Ashankavala
5	Parakkulam	6	Pathanpara
7	Pottanplavu	8	Kanakakunnu
9	Kaithalam	10	Pulikurumba
11	Venkunnu	12	Mandalam
13	Kokkayi	14	Naduvil Town
15	Pothukund	16	Arakkal Thazhe
17	Vilakkannur	18	Naduvil West
19	Thavukunnu	20	Vayattuparamba

== Geography ==
Naduvil is a hilly town on the eastern side of Kannur district. The terrain is undulating in nature and the extreme eastern side has forests bordering Karnataka state.

== Transportation ==
Kerala Hill Highway (SH 59) passes through Naduvil town. It connects to nearby towns like Alakode, Karuvanchal, Chemperi, Payyavoor, Ulikkal and Iritty. The road to the east of Iritty connects to Mysore and Bangalore. Kerala State Highway (SH 36) is accessible from Sreekandapuram town of about 10 km away from Naduvil. The National Highway (NH 66) passes through Taliparamba town. Mangalore, Goa and Mumbai can be accessed on the northern side and Cochin and Thiruvananthapuram can be accessed on the southern side. Taliparamba has a bus station and buses are easily available to all parts of Kannur district.

The nearest railway stations are Kannapuram and Kannur on Shoranur-Mangalore Section.

The nearest international airport is Kannur of about 35 km away. Mangalore and Calicut are other nearby options available. Kannur International Airport will be one of the largest airports in India once the runway length gets increased to 4000m. Kannur Airport is now the largest and most advanced airport in Kerala.

== See also ==
- Paithalmala
- Alakode
