= Payyavoor =

- Town
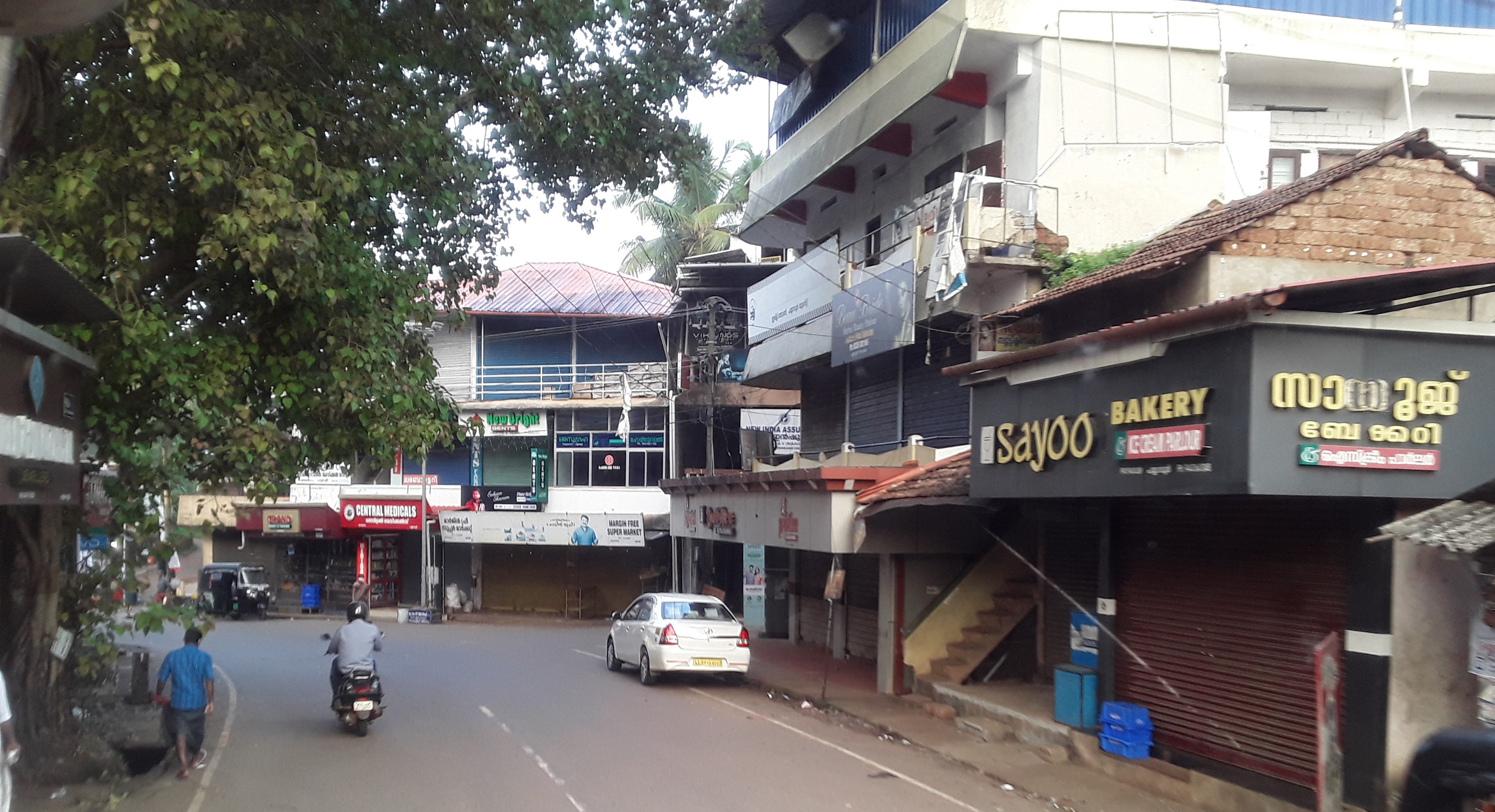
- Payyavoor town

- Location in Kerala, India Payyavoor (India)
- Coordinates: 12.056050°N 75.581990°E
- Country: India
- State: Kerala
- District: Kannur

Government
  - Type: Panchayati Raj (India)
  - Body: Payyavoor Grama Panchayat

Area
  - Total: 67.79 km^{2} (26.17 sq mi)
- Elevation: 48 m (157 ft)

Population (2011)
  - Total: 22,998
  - Density: 339.3/km^{2} (878.7/sq mi)

Languages
  - Official: Malayalam, English
- Time zone: UTC+5:30 (IST)
- PIN: 670633
- ISO 3166 code: IN-KL
- Vehicle registration: KL-59
- Nearest city: Sreekandapuram
- Lok Sabha constituency: Kannur
- Vidhan Sabha constituency: Irikkur

Payyavoor is a small town in Kannur district in the Indian state of Kerala. It is the headquarters of Payyavoor Grama Panchayat.

== Location ==
Payyavoor is located 42 km (26 mi) north east of district headquarters Kannur, 30 km (19 mi) east of taluk headquarters Taliparamba, 20 km (12 mi) north of Iritty and 10 km (6.2 mi) east of Sreekandapuram.

== Demographics ==
As of 2011 Census, Payyavoor village had a population of 22,998 with 11,373 males and 11,625 females. The average sex ratio was 1,022 lower than state average of 1,084. Payyavoor village spreads over an area of 67.79 km^{2} (26.17 sq mi) with 5,698 families residing in it. The population of children under 6 years was 2,359 (10.3%) which constitutes 1,219 males and 1,140 females. Payyavoor had an average literacy of 95.46% where male literacy was 96.8% and female literacy was 94.1%.

== Administration ==
Payyavoor Grama Panchayat consists of 17 wards. The current ruling party is UDF. Payyavoor panchayat is part of Irikkur Block Panchayat and politically a part of Irikkur Assembly constituency in Kannur Loksabha constituency.

== Law and Order ==
The Panchayat comes under jurisdiction of Payyavoor police station, which formed on 5 February 1984. This station is part of Taliparamba subdivision under Kannur rural police district.

== Educational Institutions ==
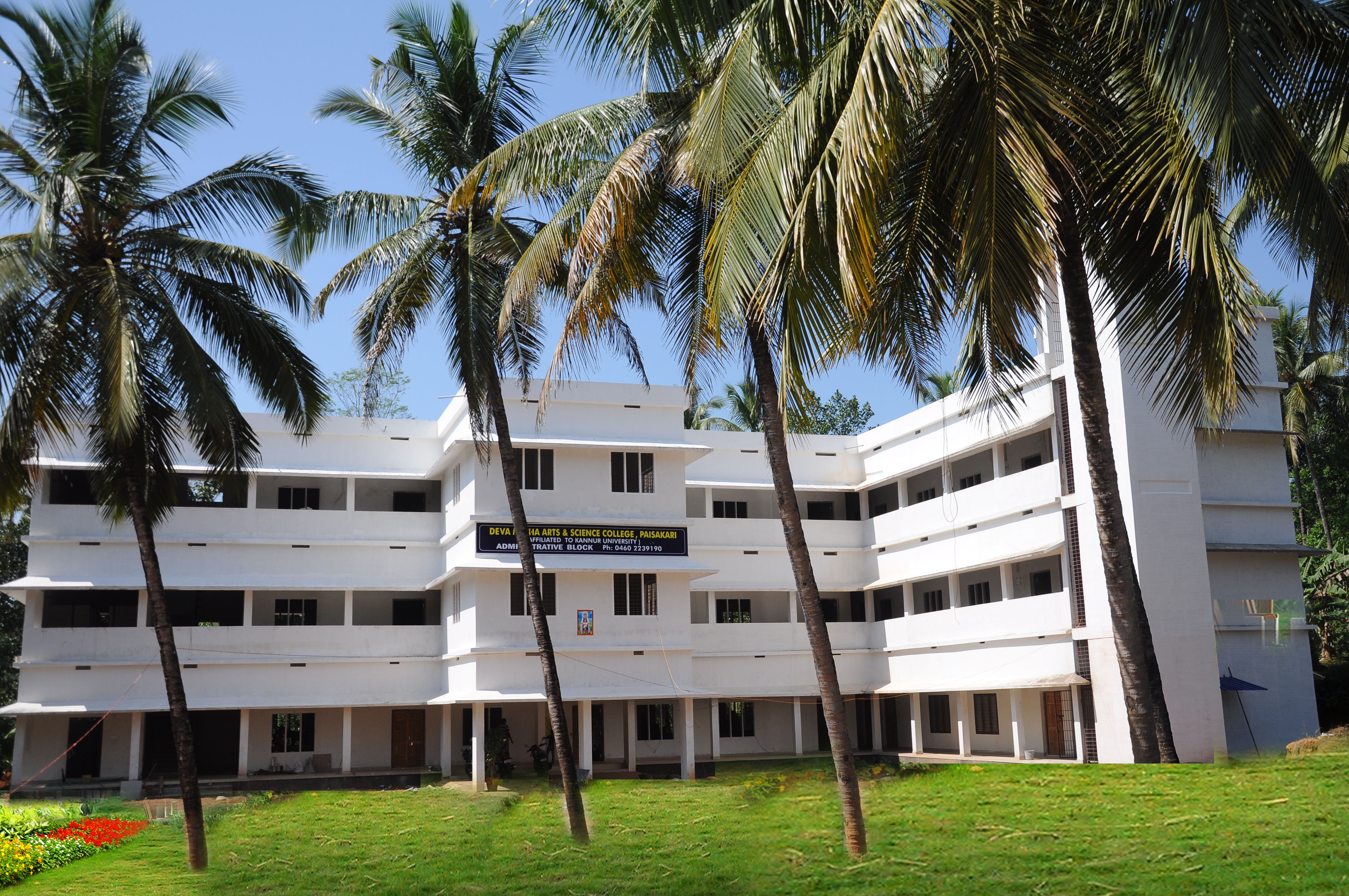
Paisakari Devamatha College

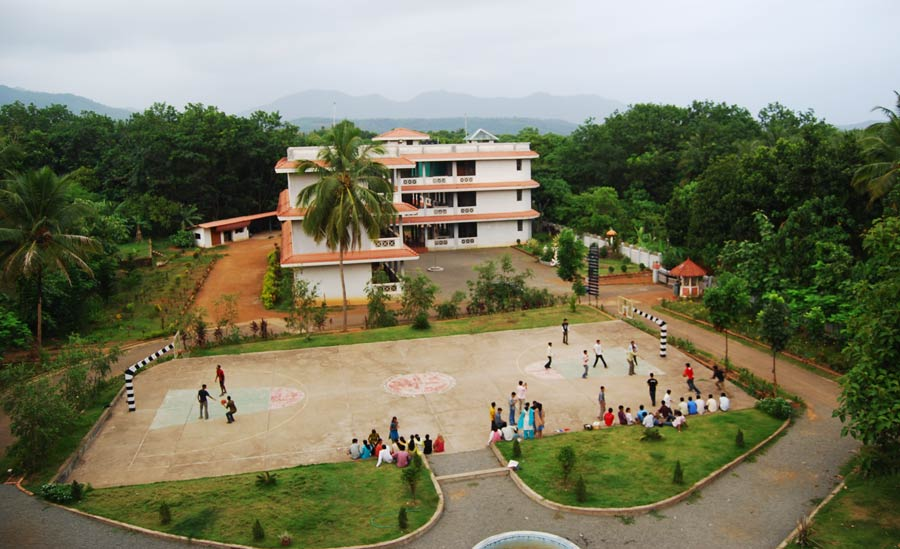
Vimal Jyothi Engineering College, Chemperi

- Sacred Higher Secondary School, Payyavoor
- St. Anne's English Medium School, Payyavoor
- Govt. UP School, Payyavoor
- Vimal Jyothi Engineering College, Chemperi
- Devamatha Arts and Science College, Paisakari
- Cherupushpa High School Chandanakampara.

== Economy ==
Payyavoor panchayat is mainly an agrarian economy. The major crops are cashew, rubber, coconut and areca nut. A distillery has been proposed by the Kerala government for making Kannur feni (liquor) from cashew apples. Payyavoor service co-operative bank was given nod for producing liquor. Apart from the one being set up in Kerala, Goa state is widely known for the production of feni from cashew apples.

Payyavur was one among the panchayats in Kannur district that affected by 2018 Kerala floods. 4 hectares of cropped area was destroyed by land slide. The affected areas in the panchayat were side slope of Upland (307m) like Vanjiyam, Adampara, Thenankara and Santhi nagar.

== Transportation ==
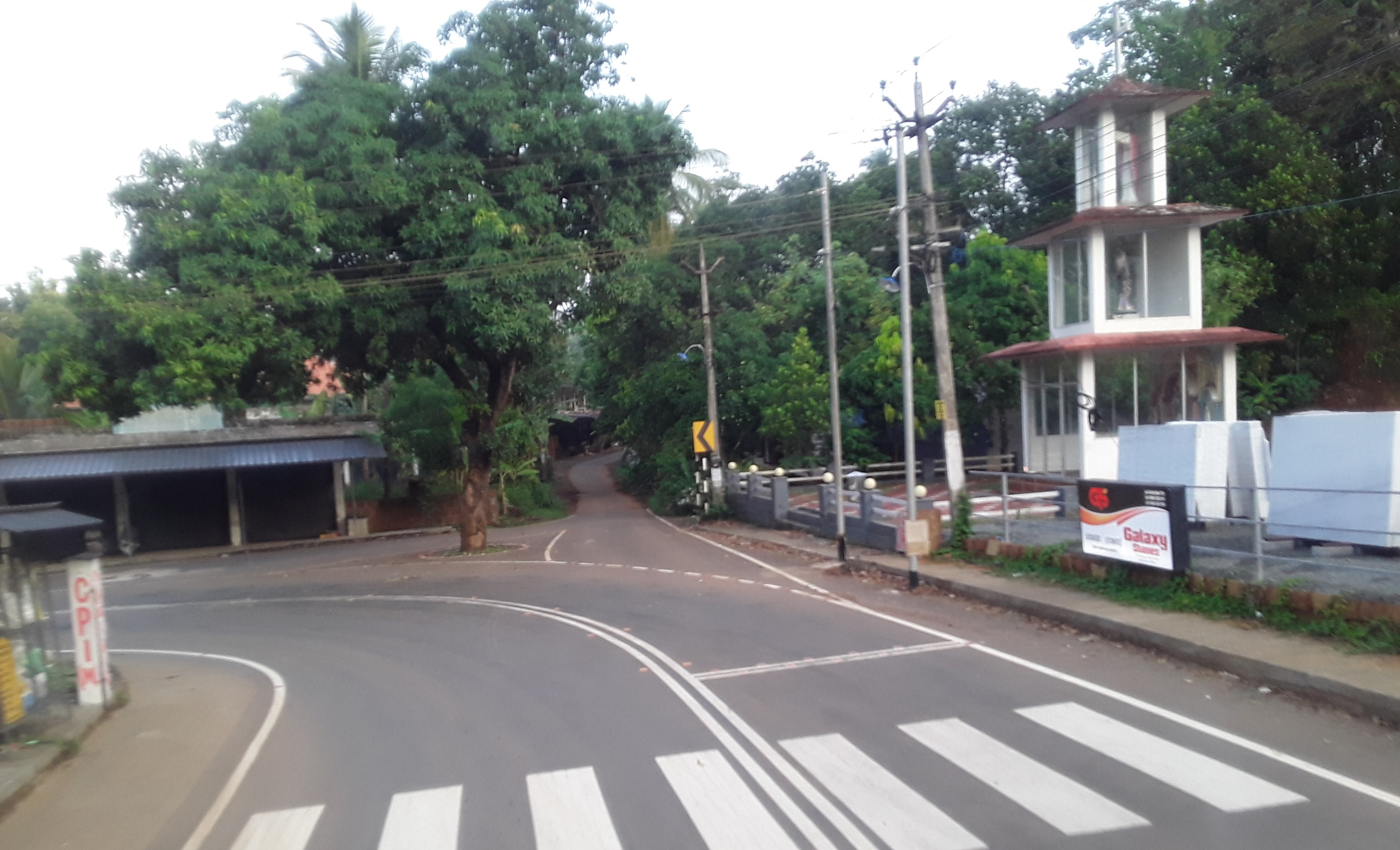
Hill Highway in Payyavoor

The National Highway (NH 66) is accessible through Taliparamba town of about 30 km (19 mi) away. Mangalore and Mumbai can be accessed on the northern side and Cochin and Thiruvananthapuram can be accessed on the southern side. The road to the east connects to Mysore and Bangalore. The nearest railway station is Kannur on Shoranur-Mangalore Section line. Kannur is the nearest international airport, 25 km (16 mi) south of Payyavoor. There are other airports at Calicut and Mangalore.

Kerala Hill Highway (SH 59) passes through Payyavoor town which connects nearby towns like Chemperi, Ulikkal, Iritty, Naduvil, Karuvanchal, Alakode etc. Kerala state highway (SH 36) passes through Sreekandapuram town of 10 km (6.2 mi) west from here.

== Notable people ==
- Thomas Animoottil, Syro Malabar Catholic bishop
