= K R Usha Kumari =

Indian teacher from Kerala

K R Usha Kumari (born 1968) is an Indian teacher from Kerala who taught in Multi Grade Learning Centres (MGLC) in the tribal areas. She won many state and national awards for her service as a teacher.

Usha lives in Amboori, a panchayath in Kattakkada Taluk of Thiruvananthapuram district in the state of Kerala. She had joined the Agasthya Multi Grade Learning Centre as teacher in 1999 and has taught the children of the Kunnathumala tribal colony for over 20 years. She was the sole teacher of the school and travelled eight kilometres (five miles) by foot every day. She is one of the 344 teachers who lost their jobs after these centres were closed down by the government on 31 March 2022.

MGLCs were set up under the District Primary Education Programme in 1992 with an aim to educate children in remote areas. It was later taken over by the Sarva Shiksha Abhiyan (now under the Education Department) and the qualification of the teachers was raised from SSLC to TTC.
