= State Highway 58 (Kerala) =

State Highway in Kerala, India

State Highway 58
- Vadakkancherry – Pollachi Road
- SH 58 highlighted in red

Route information
- Maintained by Kerala Public Works Department
- Length: 39 km (24 mi)

Major junctions
- West end: NH 544 in Vadakkencherry
- East end: SH 19 at TN border in Govindapuram

Location
- Country: India
- State: Kerala
- Districts: Thrissur, Palakkad

Highway system
- Roads in India; Expressways; National; State; Asian; State Highways in Kerala
← SH 57	→ SH 59

State Highway 58 (SH 58) is a state highway in Kerala, India that starts in Vadakkancherry and crosses the border with Tamil Nadu and ends in the city of Pollachi. The highway is 39 km long.

== Route map ==
Vadakkancherry – Mudappallur – Chittlancherry - Nemmara - Vattekkad(Elavancherry) – Kollengode – Kambrathchalla (Muthalamada) – Govindapuram – ending at Pollachi in Tamil Nadu

== Other names ==
Mangalam Govindapuram Road, Vadakkanchery Kollengode Road

== Places connected ==
- Nelliyampathi is 32 km away from Junction at Nemmara
- Pothundi Dam is 7 km away from the Junction at Nemmara
- Parambikulam Wildlife Sanctuary is connected to Kerala by means of this highway. The Road to Parambikulam diverges from Ambrampalayam in Tamil Nadu from this Highway
- The cities of Central and South Tamil Nadu, namely Madurai, Tiruchirappalli, Dindigul, Pazhani, Pollachi, Tirupur etc. were connected to Central Kerala (esp. Thrissur, Guruvayur by means of this Highway
- Part of the road Network connecting different pilgrim centers of Tamil Nadu (Palani Murugan temple, Meenakshi Amman Temple at Madurai, Basilica of Our Lady of Good Health at Velankanni, Ramanathaswamy Temple etc.) with the pilgrim centers of Kerala (Guruvayur Temple, Sabarimala, Chottanikkara Temple, Kodungallur Bhagavathy Temple, Thriprayar Temple etc.)

== Districts connected by state highway ==
- Palakkad District in Kerala
- Coimbatore District in Tamil Nadu

== Local bodies of Kerala connected by state highway ==
- Vadakkancherry
- Vandazhy
- Melarcode
- Ayiloor
- Nemmara
- Elavancherry
- Kollengode
- Muthalamada

== Townships on the state highway ==
- Nemmara
- Kollengode

== See also ==
- Roads in Kerala
- List of state highways in Kerala
