= Kappimala =

Village in Kerala, India

Kappimala is a village located in the Kannur district located in the South Indian state of Kerala.

== Tourism ==
This village is adjacent to Pythalmala. Kappimala is considered as the gateway to Pythalmala.

== Transportation ==
The national highway passes through Taliparamba town. Goa and Mumbai can be accessed on the northern side and Cochin and Thiruvananthapuram can be accessed on the southern side. Taliparamba has a bus station and buses are available to all parts of Kannur district. The road to the east of Iritty connects to Mysore and Bangalore. But buses to these cities are available only from Kannur, 22 km to the south. The nearest railway stations are Kannapuram and Kannur on Mangalore-Palakkad line. Trains are available to almost all parts of India subject to advance booking over the internet. There are airports at Kannur, Mangalore and Calicut. All of them are small international airports.

== See also ==
- Kannur
- Sreekandapuram
- Kudianmala
