= Madapurachal =

- Location in Kerala
- Coordinates: 11°55′27.3″N 75°44′38.5″E
- Country: India
- State: Kerala
- District: Kannur
- Taluk: Iritty
- Panchayath: Peravoor

Madapurachal is a town near Manathana in Peravoor panchayath, Kannur district, Kerala, India. State highway 59 passes through Madapurachal. Madapurachal is situated 50 km away from Kannur. Iritty is the nearest town which is 13 km from Madapurachal.
