= Aryanadu =

- town
- Location in Kerala, India Aryanadu (India)
- Coordinates: 8.607050°N 77.093730°E
- Country: India
- State: Kerala
- District: Thiruvananthapuram

Population (2011)
  - Total: 26,361

Languages
  - Official: Malayalam, English
- Time zone: UTC+5:30 (IST)
- Vehicle registration: KL-21

Aryanadu is a village town in Thiruvananthapuram district, Kerala, India, lying under the foothills of the Agastyarkoodam of the Sahya mountains. The village is spread along the sides of Karamana River in the western ghats of Agasthya Mountains. The Aryanad Panchayath has border with Uzhamalakkal, Vellanad, Poovachal, Kuttichal, Vithura, Tholickode panchayaths. Aryanad is situated in Nedumangad Taluk and Aruvikkara Legislative Assembly. It is situated around 25 km from Thiruvananthapuram.

== History ==
Old agers quotes "Aryanmarude (Aryas) Nadu" which literally means "Land of Aryans" is the abbreviated form of Aryanadu.

== Geography ==
The town is a Grama Panchayat consists of 17 wards. It is situated nearly 25 km east from Thiruvananthapuram,13 km south from Vithura, 10 km south from Nedumangad and 10 km north from Kattakkada. 3 km north from Kuttichal

One of the river originates from the South Western Ghats region the Karamana river, which is the main drinking water supplier to the Thiruvananthapuram city, flows through Aryanadu. Through Aryanadu the State Highway roads Nedumangad-Shorlakkodu (Tamil-Nadu) and HillHighway ( StateHighway59 ) runs.

== Demographics ==
As of 2011 India census, Aryanad had a population of 26361 with 12491 males and 13870 females.

== Economy ==
Aryanadu is a typical Kerala model village. This is purely an agricultural oriented Panchayath; coconut, rubber, banana, and vegetables are the main farming items.

== Main sights ==
There are several heritage sites, for example temples such as Tholoor Chempakamangalam Devi Temple, Ayyankala Madam, cherukkunnil sree annapoorneswari temple choozha and some historic places of interest like "kottas" (walls) and the legendary site "Thoongan para" (hanging rock).

There are also major educational institutions like Govt.ITI, Vocational & HS Schools, Govt. hospital, Police Station, KSRTC bus stand, PWD Guest House located here.

== Politics ==
Ariyanad assembly constituency is part of Attingal (Lok Sabha constituency).
