= Paduppu =

- village
- Country: India
- State: Kerala
- District: Kasaragod

Government
  - Body: Kuttikol Grama Panchayath

Languages
  - Official: Malayalam, English
- Time zone: UTC+5:30 (IST)
- PIN: 671541
- Telephone code: 4994
- Vehicle registration: KL-60, KL-14
- Literacy: 95%
- Lok Sabha constituency: Kasaragod
- Civic agency: Kuttikol Grama Panchayath
- Climate: cool pleasant (Köppen)
- Website: [ www.akshayakendra.com%20www.akshayakendra.com]]

Paduppu is a small hamlet in Karivedakam village in Kasaragod District, Kerala, India.which is home for the most popular youth club in Kasaragod district,(UNITED PADUPPU ARTS AND SPORTS CLUB) 45 kilometres (28 mi) from Kanhangad and 35 kilometres (22 mi) from Kasaragod.

== Schools and colleges ==
- GLP School Thavanath
- Sanjos English Medium
- Safa Public School
- ALP School Sankarampady
- San Geo Central school

== Holy places ==
- St. George Church
- Badar Juma Masjid Paduppu
- Sree Dharma Sastha Bhajana Mandiram

== Transportation ==
This village is connected to Karnataka state through Poinachi- Bandaduka-Sulya road. There is a 20 km distance between Bandaduka to Sullia in Karnataka from where Bangalore and Mysore can be easily accessed. Locations in Kerala can be accessed by driving towards the western side. The nearest railway station is Kanhangad railway station on Mangalore-Palakkad line. There are international airports at Mangalore and Kannur.
