= Alakode, Kannur district =

Alakode
- Town
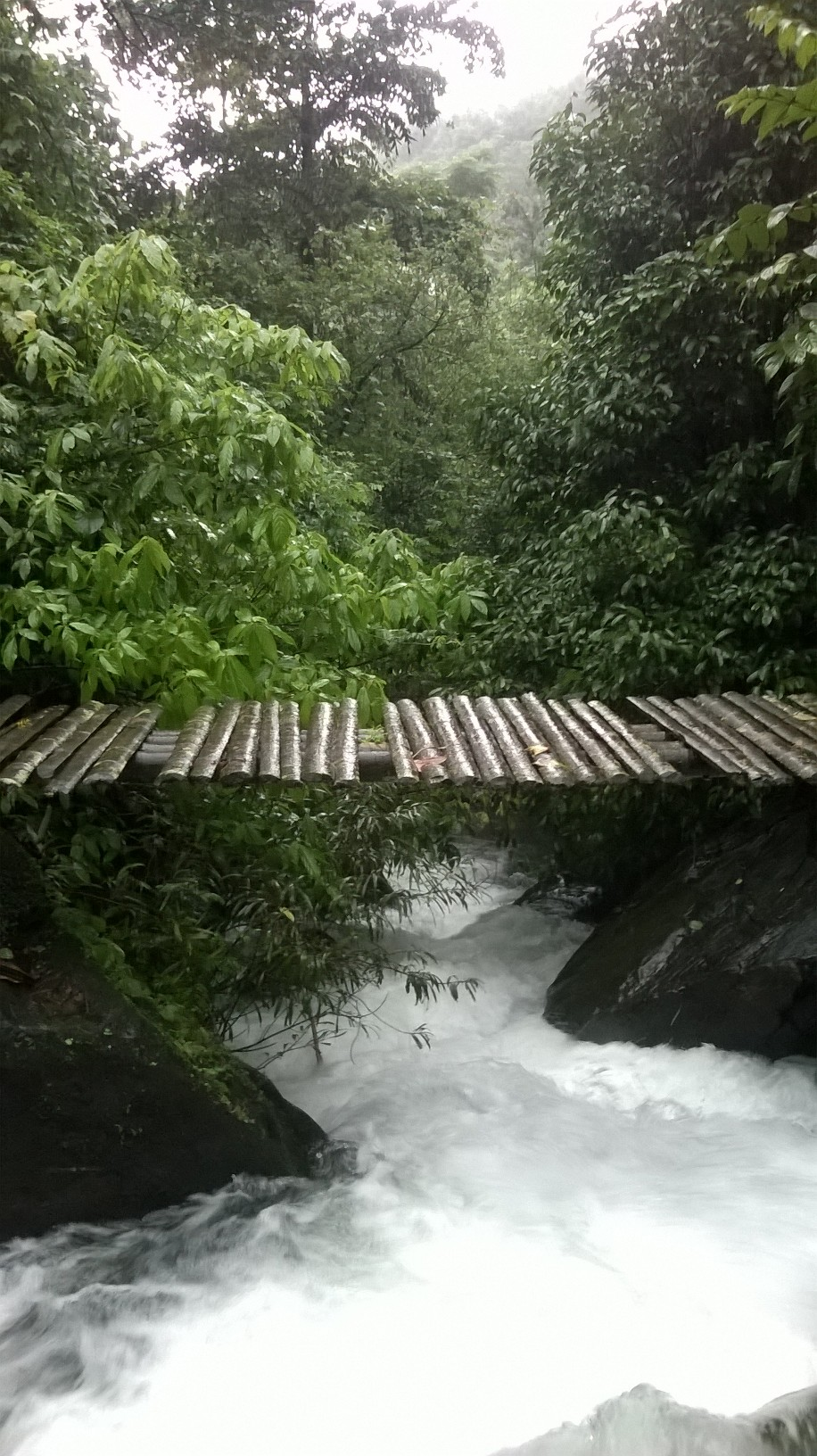

- Location in Kannur, India Alakode (India)
- Coordinates: 12.1910°N 75.4673°E
- Country: India
- State: Kerala
- District: Kannur
- Taluk: Taliparamba

Government
  - Body: Grama Panchayat

Area
  - Total: 70.77 km^{2} (27.32 sq mi)
- Elevation: 85 m (279 ft)

Population (2011)
  - Total: 34,878
  - Density: 492.8/km^{2} (1,276/sq mi)

Languages
  - Official: Malayalam, English
- Time zone: UTC+5:30 (IST)
- PIN: 670571
- Telephone code: 04602
- ISO 3166 code: IN-KL
- Vehicle registration: KL 59
- Literacy: 95.38%
- Niyamasabha constituency: Irikkur
- Lok Sabha constituency: Kannur
- Website: https://www.lsgkerala.in/alakode

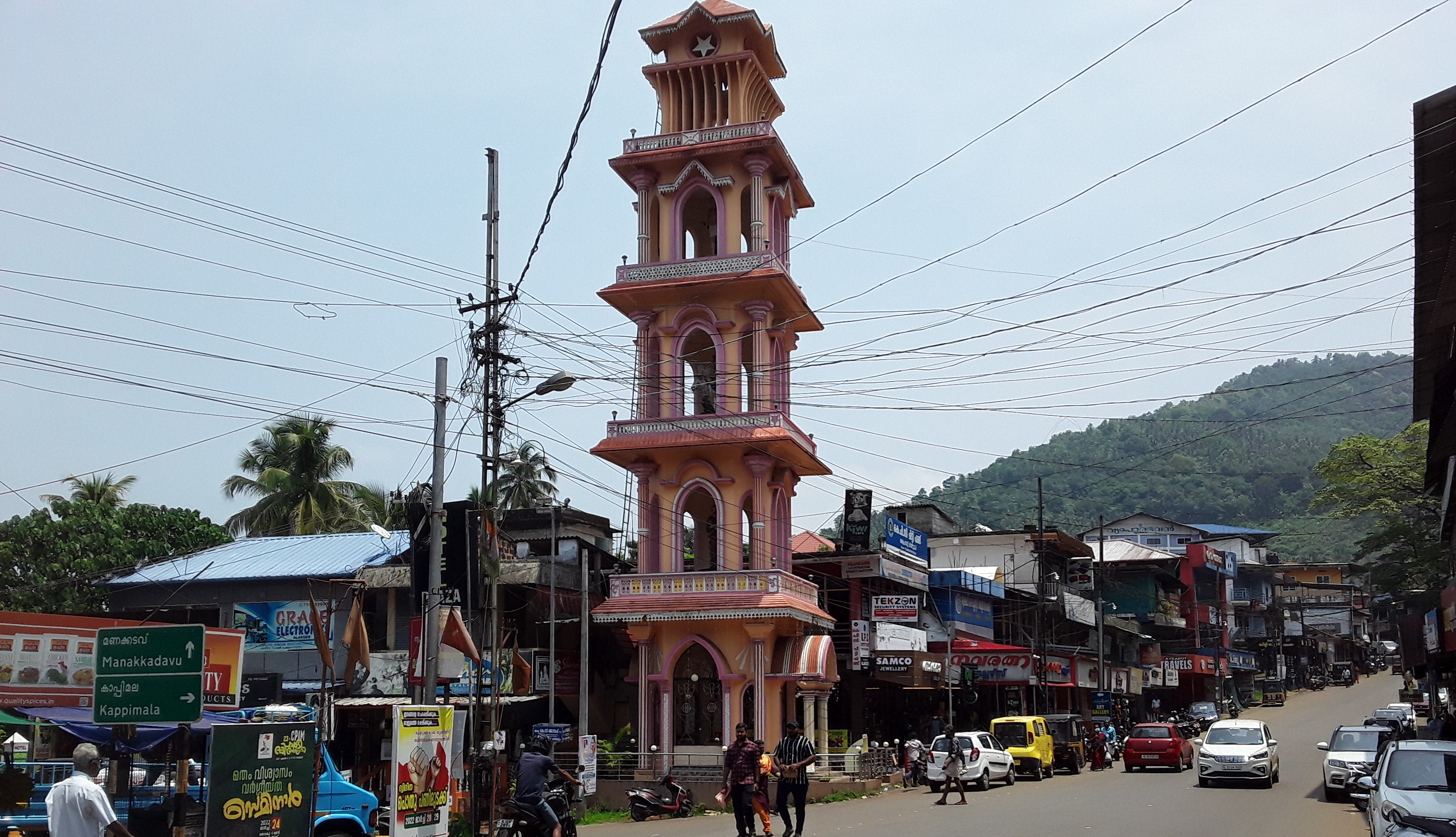
Alakode town

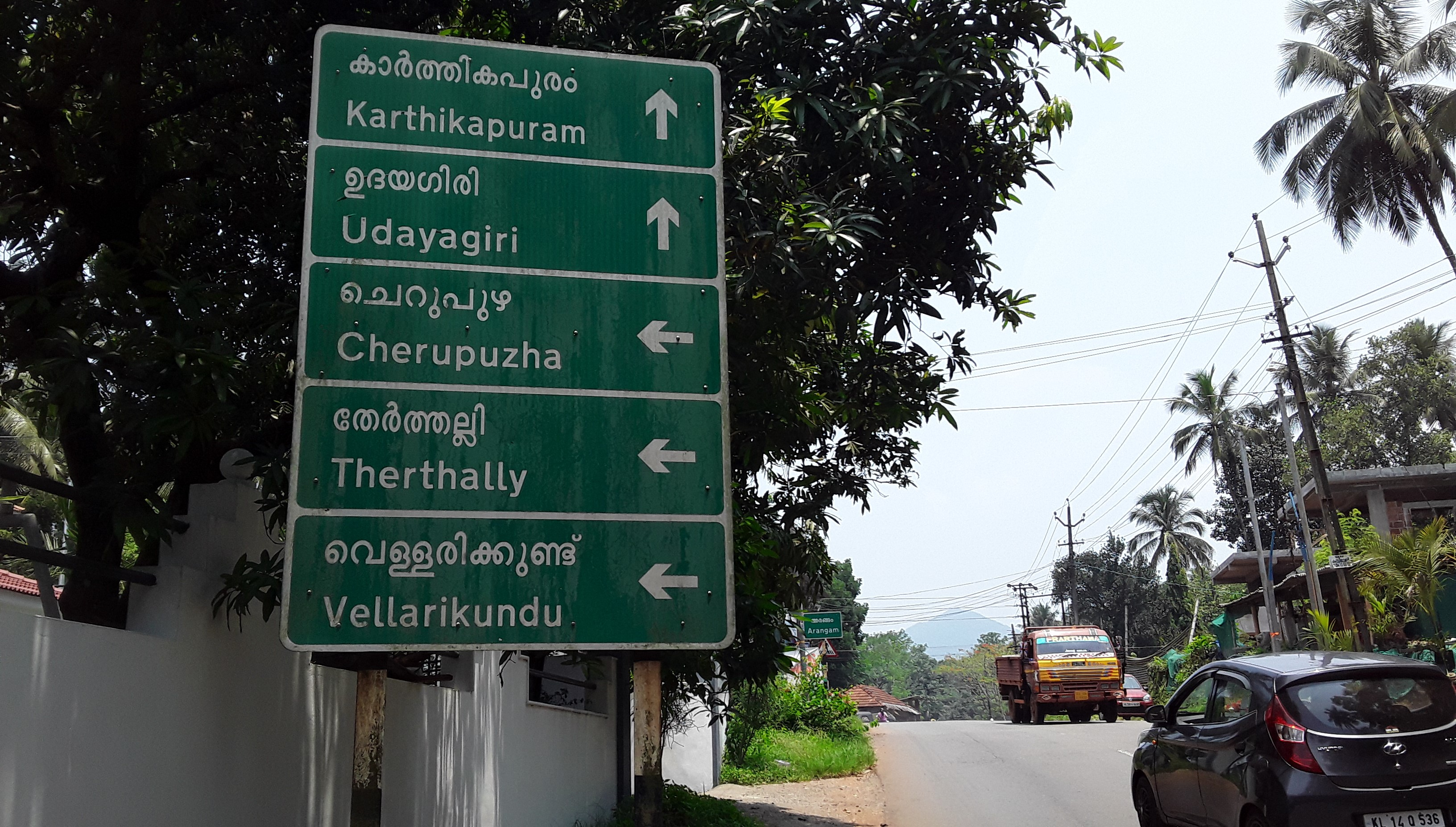
Alakode road at Arangam

Alakode is an emerging town and a panchayat in Kannur district in the Indian state of Kerala. It is located on the Taliparamba-Manakadavu-Coorg road, 46 km (29 mi) north of the district headquarters, Kannur. The town was one of the major centers of the Malabar migration.

Alakode is also home to several neighbouring localities including Rayarome, Arangam, Therthally, and Nellippara.

== Demographics ==
As of 2011 Census, Alakode had a population of 33,173 which constitutes 16,289 males and 16,884 females. Alakode village spreads over an area of 72.68 km^{2} (28.06 sq mi) with 8,007 families residing it. Population of children in the age group 0-6 was 3,318 which makes up 10.00% of total population of village. The average sex ratio of Alakode was 1,023 lower than state average of 1,084. The literacy rate of Alakode was 95.38% compared to 94.00% of Kerala. Male literacy stands at 96.87% while female literacy rate was 93.96%.

== Administration ==
Alakode Grama Panchayat is a part of Taliparamba Block Panchayat. Alakode panchayat has administration over Alakode, Thimiri and Vellad villages. Alakode is politically part of Irikkur Assembly constituency in Kannur Lok Sabha constituency.

== Transportation ==
Kerala hill highway (SH 59) passes through Alakode town which connects it with other towns like Cherupuzha, Karuvanchal, Chemperi, Payyavoor, Iritty etc. Mysore and Bangalore can be accessed from east of Ulikkal or Iritty. Taliparamba-Coorg border road is another major road connecting Alakode with Taliparamba and Manakadavu. National Highway (NH 66) passes through Taliparamba town. Goa and Mumbai can be accessed on northern side and Kochi and Trivandrum are accessible from southern side.

The nearest railway stations are Kannapuram and Kannur on Shoranur-Mangalore Section.

The nearest international airport is Kannur of about 46.5 km away. Mangalore and Calicut are other nearby options available.

== Economy ==
Most of the people in Alakode are engaged in agriculture or business. The area is known for exporting hill products like rubber, dry copra, pepper, areca nut, etc. to the industries located in the northern parts of India.

Alakode is one among the key centres of Malabar Migration where people migrated here during the 1940s and 1950s from Northern Travancore area and played a major role in the local economy.

== Education ==
- Mary Matha Arts and Science College, Alakode
- St. Mary's Convent Sr. Sec. School, Alakode
- NSS HSS, Alakode
- Nirmala UP school

== Banking ==
- State Bank of India
- Federal Bank
- Canara Bank (Previously Syndicate Bank)
- Kerala Bank
- Kerala Gramin Bank
- Alakode service co-operative bank
- Taliparamba PCARD Bank, Alakode
- HDFC Bank

== Notable people ==
- M. D. Valsamma, Indian athlete
