= Pulikkanny =

- town
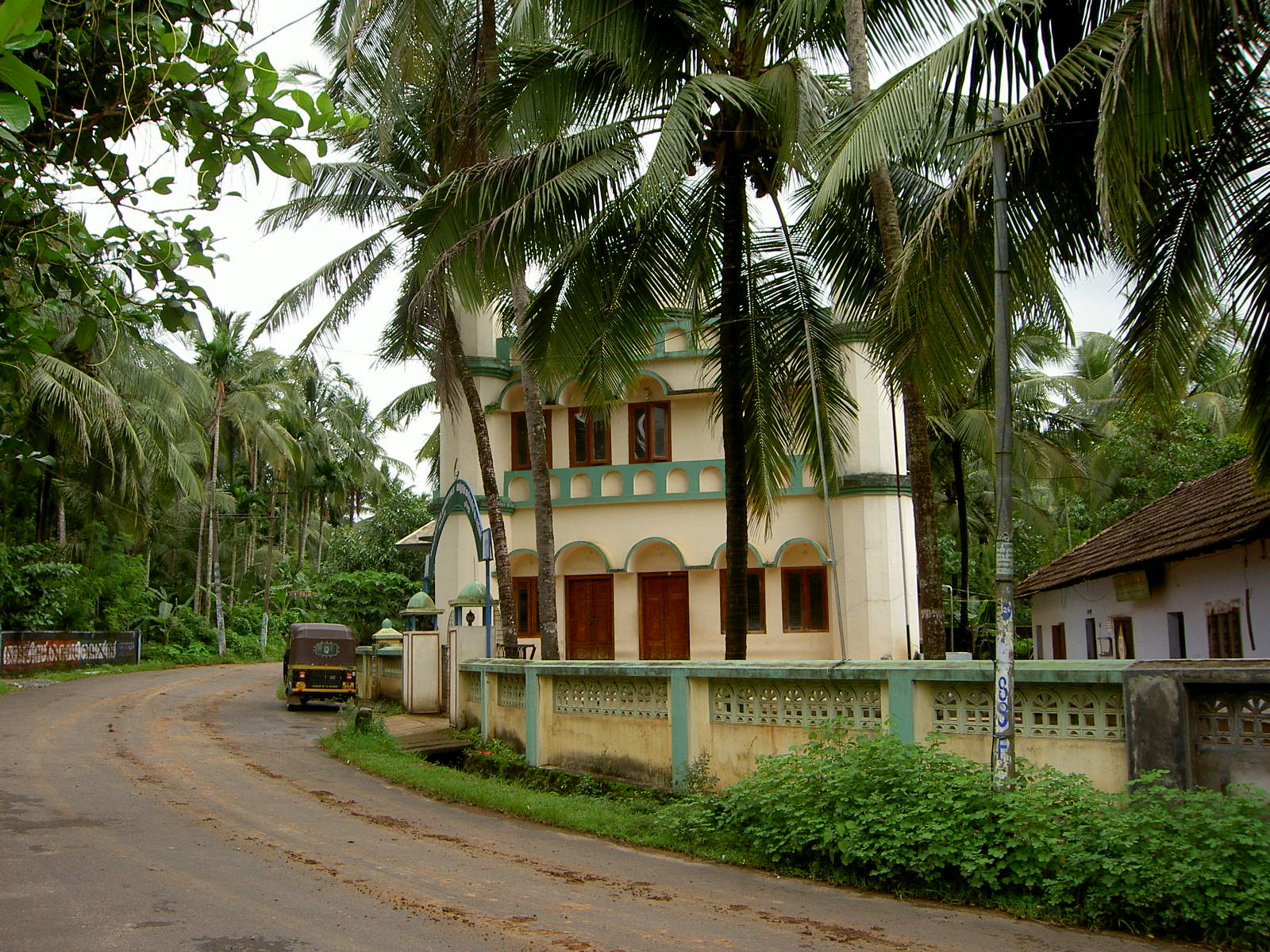
- Pulikkanny Juma Masjid
- Interactive map of Pulikkanny
- Coordinates: 10°26′10″N 76°21′54″E
- Country: India
- State: Kerala
- District: Thrissur

Population
  - Total: 2,000

Languages
  - Official: Malayalam, English
- Time zone: UTC+5:30 (IST)
- PIN: 680304
- Telephone code: +91480
- Vehicle registration: KL-45
- Nearest city: Thrissur
- Lok Sabha constituency: Thrissur

Pulikkanny is a small village near Varantharappilli in Thrissur district of Kerala state, south India.

== Location ==
Thrissur is 25 km from Pulikkanny. Chimmony dam is 12 km from here. Kurumali River flows through this village.

== Politics ==
Pulikkanny ward in 2015 elected E.M. Ummer of the IUML party for Local Self Government. In 2020 the ward began to be represented by K.H. Suhara also of the IUML party.

== Forest Research Institute ==
A Field Research Station of Kerala Forest Research Institute (KFRI) has a bamboo research center just outside of Pulikkanny. Many types of bamboo are grown in this "bambusetum."

== Gallery ==
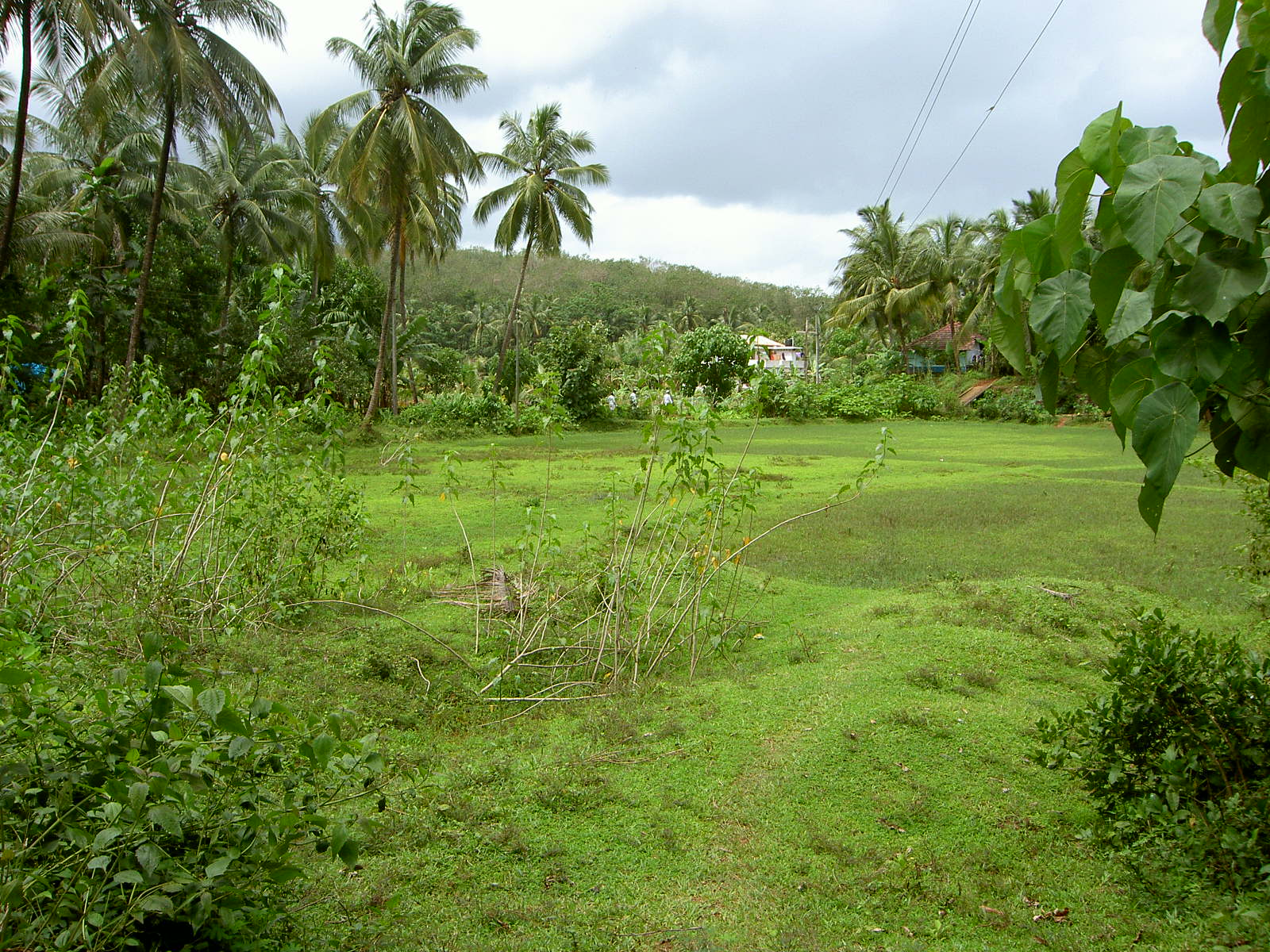
Pulikkanny

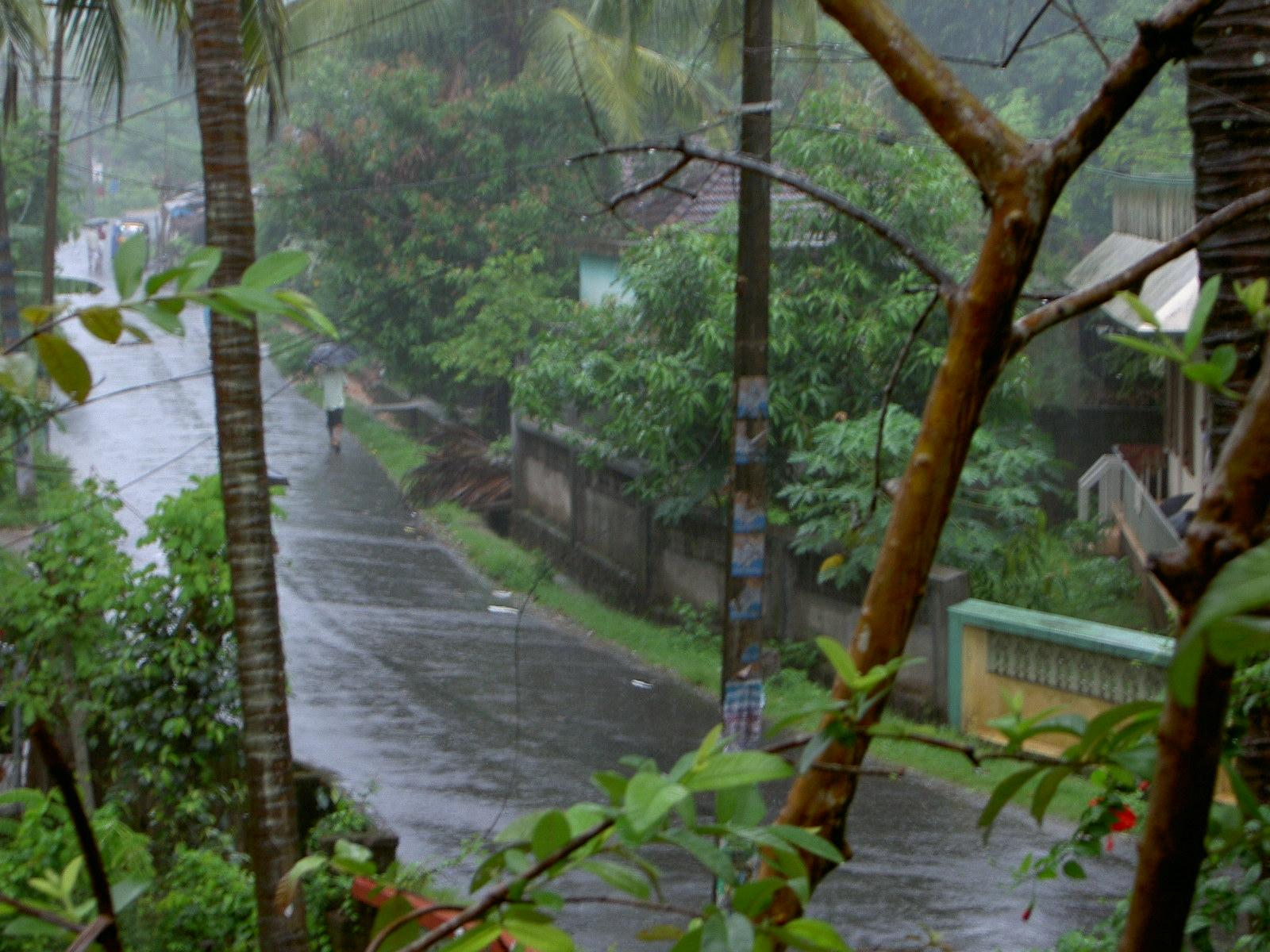
Pulikkanny
