= Kallikkad =

- village
- Location in Kerala, India Kallikkad (India)
- Coordinates: 8.5469°N 77.2109°E
- Country: India
- State: Kerala
- District: Thiruvananthapuram
- Talukas: Kattakkada

Government
  - Body: Kallikkad Panchayat

Population (2011)
  - Total: 9,413

Languages
  - Official: Malayalam, English
- Time zone: UTC+5:30 (IST)
- PIN: 695572
- Telephone code: 0471
- Vehicle registration: KL-01
- Sex ratio: 111 ♂/♀
- Civic agency: Kallikkad Panchayat

Kallikkad is a village in Thiruvananthapuram District in the southern Indian state of Kerala. The village is one of the 11 census villages in the Kattakada taluka of Thiruvananthapuram district. As per the 2011 Census of India, Kallikkad has a population of 9,413. Males number 4,605 and females number 4,808. Neyyar dam is situated in this panchayath. there are so many Kani settlements in this panchayath. vlavetti is one of them. this panchayath have prominent historical and cultural backgrounds. the travancore king, Marthanda varma's plight against Ettuveetil pillas were through the mountain paths of kallikkadu.

The famous Kanipattu strike was organised by the Communist party leaders of Kallikkad and Ottasekharamangalam. Vikraman Nair, Kallikkad Gangan (Gangadharan) politburo member, Kunjiraman Nair etc. were the leaders. Kallikkad Ramachandran the famous filmmaker and writer was born in Kallikkad. K R Ajayan, the journalist and short story writer and worldwide traveller, Aji daivappura poet and lyricist are from this village. Sporting union the famous sports club which contributed many youngsters to the field is here. Adhyathma Chinthalaya Ashramam is at Neyyardam-Kallikkad. Sivanda Yoga Kendra in Neyyardam is the world-denoted spiritual place at Neyyardam in Kallikkad. The Neyyardam was built in the land given by a famous agriculturist and landlord Mr. Karuvachi Krishnan Panicker,(Father of Kallikkad Kesavan Panicker(father of Kallikad Ramachandran) ) Maruthummootil, Kallikkad and many of his family members from Kallikkad.

Kallikad Grama Panchayat was formed in 1962 from parts of Ottasekharamangalam Panchayat. Some parts of Kallikkad Panchayat were later shifted to Amboori Panchayat.
