= Kannara =

Kannara may refer to:

- Krishna I (r. c. 756-774 CE), Rashtrakuta king of present-day India
- Krishna II (r. c. 878–914 CE), Rashtrakuta king of present-day India
- Krishna of Devagiri (r. c. 1246-1260 CE), Seuna (Yadava) king of present-day India
- Kannara, Thrissur, a village in Kerala, India
