= Mannamangalam =

- village
- Location in Kerala, India Mannamangalam (India)
- Coordinates: 10°29′40″N 76°20′10″E
- Country: India
- State: Kerala
- District: Thrissur

Government
  - Body: Puthur Grama Panchayath, Pananhery Grama Panchayath

Population (2011)
  - Total: 7,878

Languages
  - Official: Malayalam, English
- Time zone: UTC+5:30 (IST)
- PIN: 680014
- Vehicle registration: KL-

Mannamangalam is a village in Thrissur district in the state of Kerala, India.

== Demographics ==
As of 2011 India census, Mannamangalam had a population of 7878 with 3927 males and 3951 females.
