= Koodal =

- town
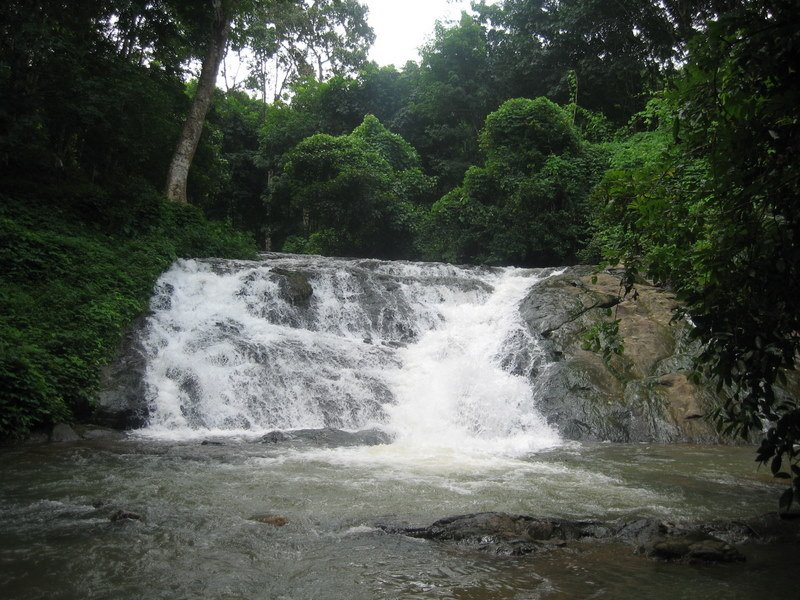
- Water falls at the Rajagiri estate in Koodal

- Location in Kerala, India
- Coordinates: 9°9′0″N 76°51′0″E
- Country: India
- State: Kerala
- District: Pathanamthitta

Government
  - Body: Kalanjoor Grama Panchayat

Area
  - Total: 33.05 km^{2} (12.76 sq mi)

Population
  - Total: 15,979
  - Density: 483.5/km^{2} (1,252/sq mi)

Languages
  - Official: Malayalam, English
- Time zone: UTC+5:30 (IST)
- PIN: 689693
- Telephone code: 914682, 914734
- Vehicle registration: KL-83
- Nearest city: Pathanamthitta
- Sex ratio: Males-8441, Females-9443 ♂/♀
- Literacy: 95%
- Lok Sabha constituency: Pathanamthitta
- Climate: normal (Köppen)

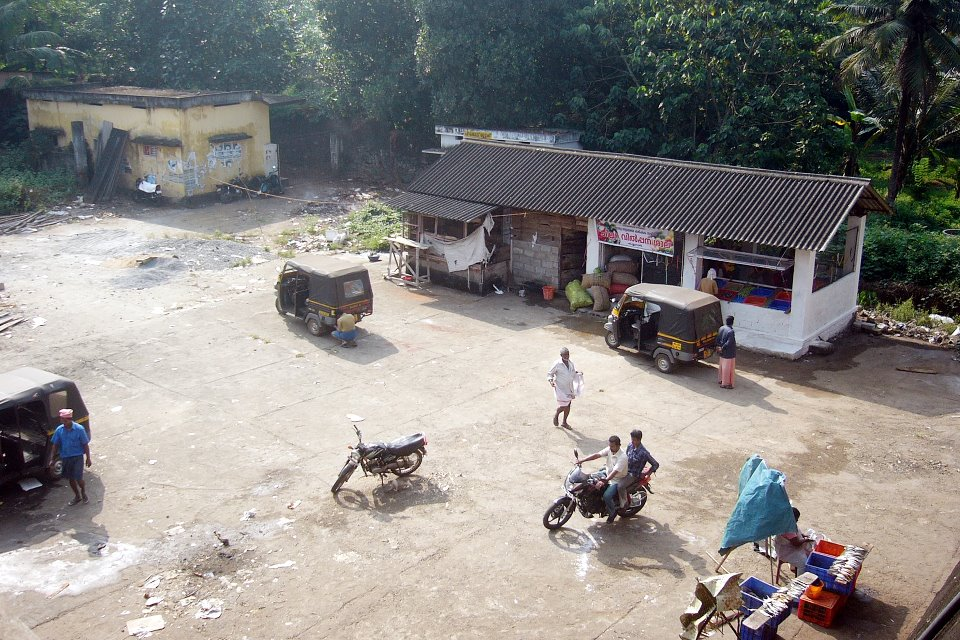
Koodal Market

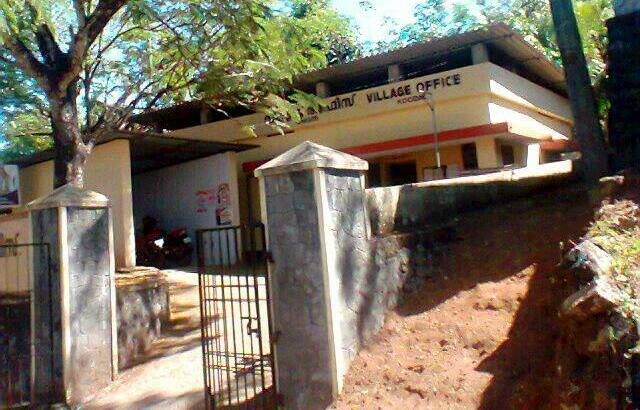
Village Office

Koodal is the second largest town in Konni Taluk at Pathanamthitta District, located in Kerala state, India.Koodal Situates On Main Eastern Highway (Punalur-Muvattupuzha Road).

== Location ==
Koodal is located on the Main Eastern Highway (Punalur-Pathanamthitta-Muvattupuzha Road / SH - 08) between Konni and Pathanapuram. A panchayat stadium is situated in koodal for sports and other cultural activities

== Transportation ==
Koodal is accessible by bus from Punalur (19 km), and Konni 11 km and the nearest railway stations are Punalur, Chengannur, Thiruvalla, Avaneeswaram and Kayamkulam. The nearest airport is Trivandrum International Airport. Nearest temple is koodal sreedevi temple

== Schools ==
- Govt.VHSS & HSS Koodal
- Koodal Govt. LP school
- Sn Public School

== Population ==
Koodal has a mixed population of Hindus, Muslims and Christians. Many of the inhabitants of this village are settlers there due to the introduction of rubber plantations, mainly by the plantation corporation of Kerala and the A.V. Thomas and company. A number of people from Koodal are employed abroad, mainly in the Middle East and US. Koodal has its own police station, primary health centre, Government Vocational Higher Secondary School and other public schools, post office, panchayath mini stadium, homeo clinic, ice cream factory etc...

== Clubs and associations ==
- Koodal has a Rotary club and various other cultural and youth clubs.
- Lions Club
- Punnamood Grandasala
- Karakkakuzhi Grandasala
- Navodaya Arts and Sports Club
- Pulari Club
- Yuva Arts And Sports Club Kurangayam
- Cosmos Arts And Sports Club Stadium
- Brothers Club Stadium
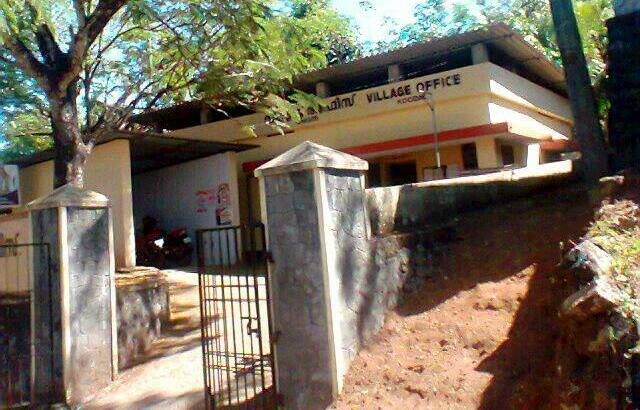
Koodal Village Office

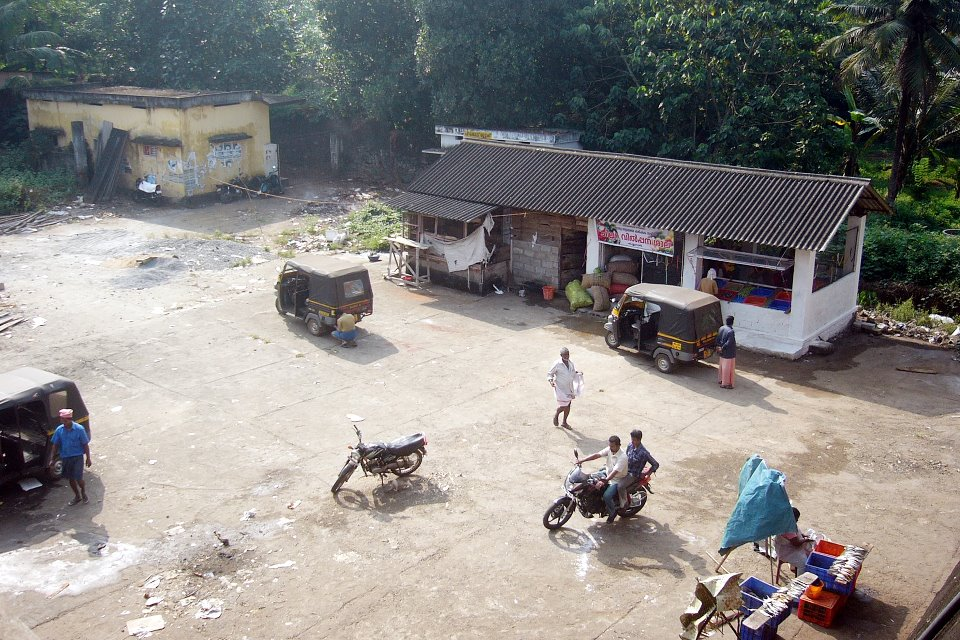
Koodal Market

== Churches & Temples ==
- KOODAL SREEDEVI TEMPLE
- ST PIUS MALANKARA CATHOLIC CHURCH
- KOODAL ST GEORGE MALANKARA JACOBITE CHURCH(Kandathi palli)
- Koodal St Marys Orthodox Mahaedavaka
- Koodal St Pauls Orthodox Church
- Kalanjoor St George Orthodox Valiyapally
- India Pentecostal Church of God
- Bethel Assemblies of God church
- Sharon Fellowship Church
- Bethel Marthoma church
- Koodal-St George Jacobite Church
- Karakkakuzhi Sree Bhadrakali Temple
- Karakkakuzhi Sree Mahadeva Temple
- Pothupara Malanada Sree Bhagavathi Temple
