= Kolichal =

Village in Kerala, India

Kolichal is a small village town located in Vellarikkund, Kerala, India.
