= Karuvanchal =

- Town
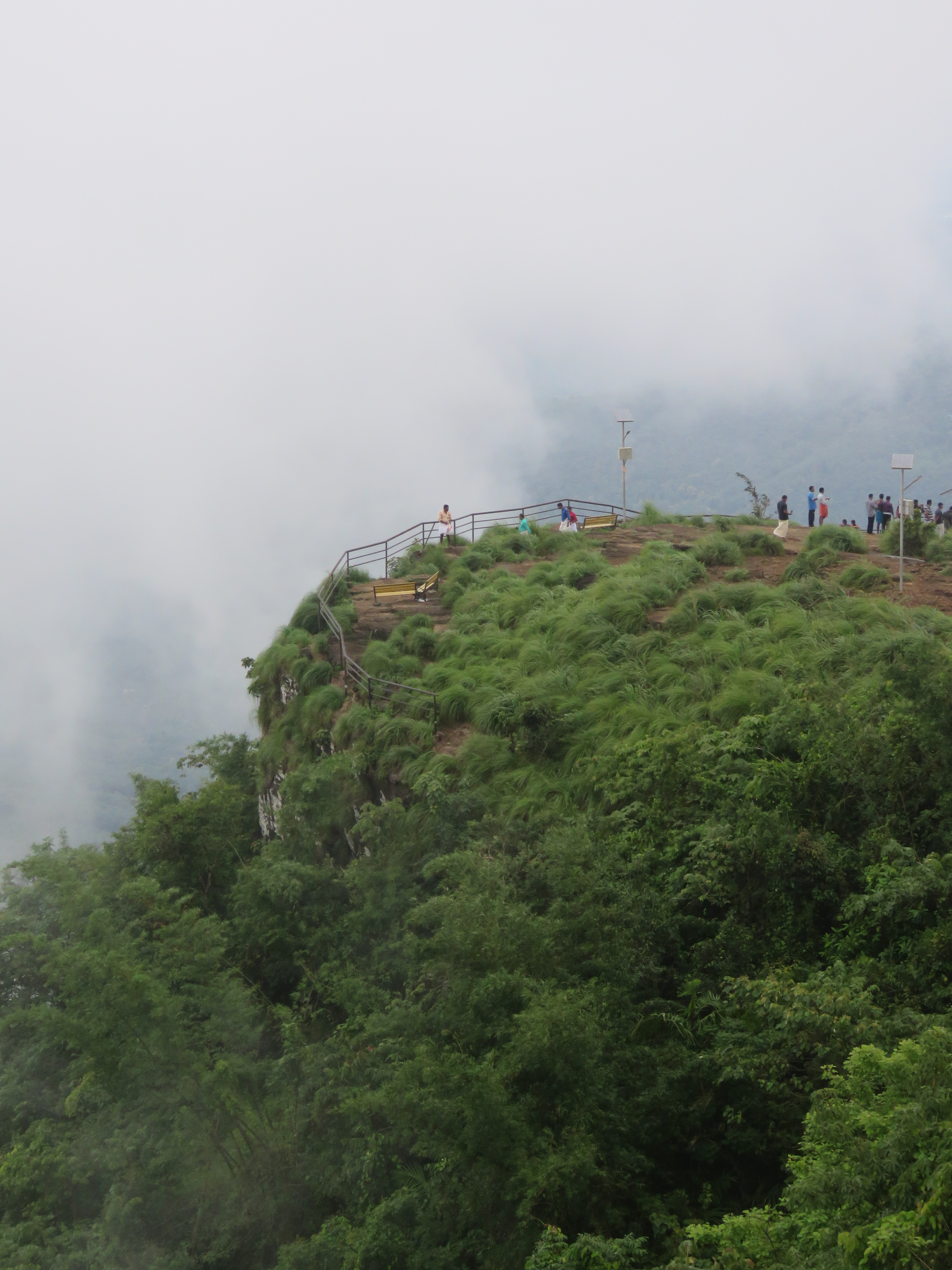
- Palakkayam Thattu viewpoint

- Location in Kerala, India Karuvanchal (India)
- Coordinates: 12.1673°N 75.4619°E
- Country: India
- State: Kerala
- District: Kannur
- Taluk: Taliparamba

Government
  - Body: Naduvil Grama Panchayat
- Elevation: 38 m (125 ft)

Languages
  - Official: Malayalam, English
- Time zone: UTC+5:30 (IST)
- PIN: 670571
- Telephone code: 04982
- ISO 3166 code: IN-KL
- Vehicle registration: KL 59
- Assembly constituency: Irikkur
- Lok Sabha constituency: Kannur
- Nearest Railway station: Kannur, Kannapuram

Karuvanchal is a town in the hilly terrain of Kannur district in the Indian state of Kerala. Kerala Hill Highway (SH 59) passes through Karuvanchal town.

== Location ==
Karuvanchal town is situated on the banks of Kuppam River which originates from Western Ghats and flows into Arabian Sea. It is located on Taliparamba-Coorg border road of about 22 km north east of Taliparamba and 44 km away from Kannur.

== Economy ==
Karuvanchal is mainly an agrarian economy. Crops like rubber, coconut, areca nut, cashew, pepper etc are cultivated here.

The fifth Vithulsavam (seed festival) was held at Karuvanchal on 2016 under the auspices of the Fair Trade Alliance Kerala (FTAK), an organisation of small holder farmers drawn from the hill areas of the State, has exhibited a large collection of seeds of agrarian crops.

== Important Institutions ==
- St. Joseph's Multi Speciality Hospital, Karuvanchal
- State Bank of India, Karuvanchal
- South Indian Bank, Karuvanchal
- Kerala Grameen Bank, Karuvanchal
- Kerala Bank, Karuvanchal
- Naduvil Co-operative Bank, Karuvanchal
- Little Flower Senior Secondary School, Karuvanchal
- Government Higher Secondary School, Kaniyanchal
- St. Joseph's Higher Secondary School, Vayattuparamba

== Demographics ==
As of 2011 Census, Vellad village (HQ: Karuvanchal) had a population of 25,875 which constitutes 12,985 males and 12,890 females. Vellad village office is located at Karuvanchal town.

== Administration ==
Karuvanchal comes under ward no.1 of Naduvil Grama panchayat. Naduvil panchayat divided into 19 wards. It is 7 km away from Naduvil town. Local body elections are conducted once in every 5 years. However, there was a proposal for the formation of new Karuvanchal panchayat by bifurcating Naduvil panchayat in 2015. And Along with this, many panchayats were about to bifurcate. But Kerala government reverted their decision to form new panchayats due to less political support. So Karuvanchal panchayat didn't get materialized.

== Tourism ==
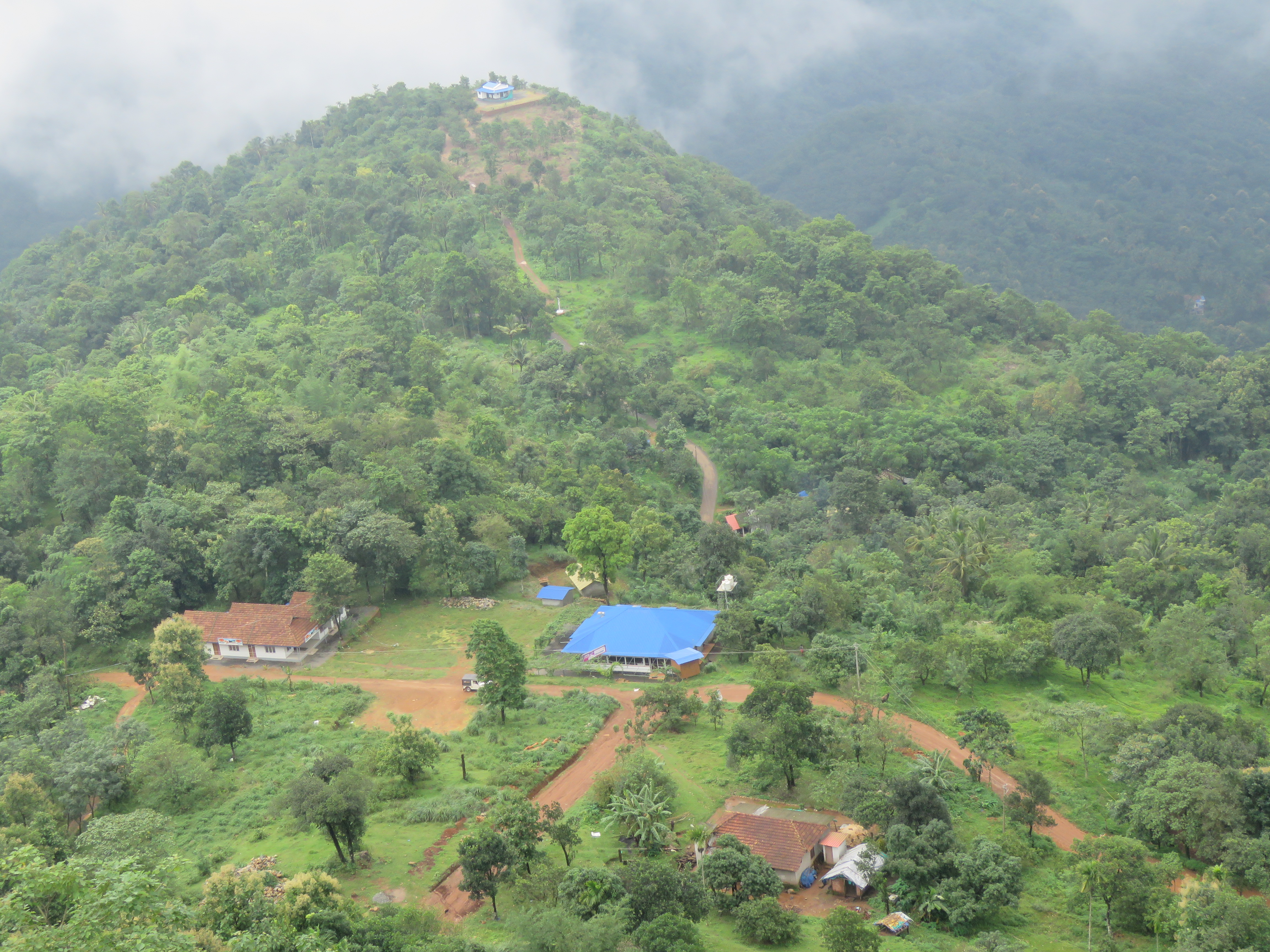

Karuvanchal is the gateway to Palakkayam Thattu, one of the major tourist spots in the region which is termed as the Ooty of Malabar. The facilities provided there include those who like adventure tourism. The tourists can relish the sight of the place sitting on the metal benches fixed besides the barricades. Adventure park, trekking, tents and view points are the interest points. Zip line, rope cross, zorbing ball, gun shooting, and archery are the attractions of the park.

== Transportation ==
Kerala Hill Highway (SH 59) passes through Karuvanchal town. It connects with Iritty and other towns in Hill Highway. The road to the east of Iritty connects to Mysore and Bangalore. National Highway (NH 66) passes through Taliparamba town. Mangalore and Mumbai can be accessed on the northern side and Cochin and Trivandrum on the southern side.

The nearest railway stations are Kannur and Kannapuram on the Shoranur-Mangalore section. The nearest airport Kannur International Airport is 43 km away.
