= Vellad =

- village
- Location in Kerala, India
- Coordinates: 12.1620°N 75.4956°E
- Country: India
- State: Kerala
- District: Kannur

Area
  - Total: 80.94 km^{2} (31.25 sq mi)

Population (2011)
  - Total: 25,875
  - Density: 319.7/km^{2} (828.0/sq mi)

Languages
  - Official: Malayalam, English
- Time zone: UTC+5:30 (IST)
- PIN: 670571
- ISO 3166 code: IN-KL
- Vehicle registration: KL 59

Vellad is a large village in Kannur district in the Indian state of Kerala.

== Demographics ==
As of 2011 census, Vellad had a population of 25,875, with 12,985 (50.2%) males and 12,890 (49.8%) females. Vellad village spreads over an area of 80.94 km^{2} (31.25 sq mi) with 6,229 families residing in it. The average sex ratio was 993, lower than the state average of 1,084. In Vellad, 9.7% of the population was under the age of six. Vellad had an average literacy of 95.85%, higher than the state average of 94.00%; male literacy was 97% and female literacy was 94.7%.

== Economy ==
The population depends on agriculture for their livelihood. The main commercial cash crop is rubber. There are two high schools within a radius of 3 km.

== Transportation ==
The national highway passes through Taliparamba town. Goa and Mumbai can be accessed to the north and Cochin and Thiruvananthapuram to the south. Taliparamba has a bus station and buses are available to all parts of Kannur district. The road to the east of Iritty connects to Mysore and Bangalore, but buses to these cities are available only from Kannur, 22 km to the south.

The nearest railway stations are Kannapuram and Kannur on the Mangalore-Palakkad line. Trains are available to almost all parts of India subject to advance booking over the internet.

There are airports at Kannur, Mangalore and Calicut. All three are international airports, although direct flights are available only to Middle Eastern countries.
