= Kudappanamoodu =

Village in Thiruvananthapuram District, Kerala, India

Coordinates: 8.477°N 77.187°E

Kudappanamoodu is a village in the south east of Thiruvananthapuram district in the state of Kerala in India. Kudappanamoodu is a village town with a population (As of 2001) of 1789. An important ethnic group in the area is communist and the Tamil Muslims. Kudappanamoodu is 41 km (25 mi) from the Agastiya mountain peak where Sage Agastiya, the founder of Ayurveda, is believed to have built his hermitage.

== Geography ==
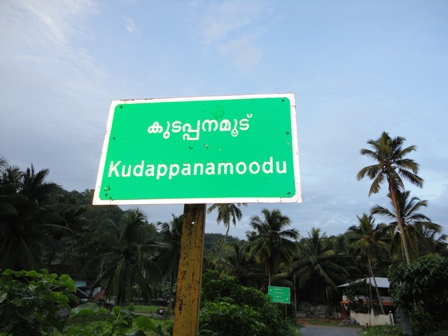
Kudappanamoodu board in Kasaroad

Kudappanamoodu is situated in the southern tip of western ghats, surrounded by hills. South east of Kudappanamoodu is the state of Tamil Nadu. It is surrounded by the grama panchayaths of Vellarada, Ottasekharamangalam, Aryancode, and Kallikkadu in the south, south-west and west respectively. Kudappanamoodu is well known for its high-yielding rubber plantations. The area also cultivates coconut, pepper, herbs, and medicinal plants.
