= Paithalmala =

Hill station in Kerala, India

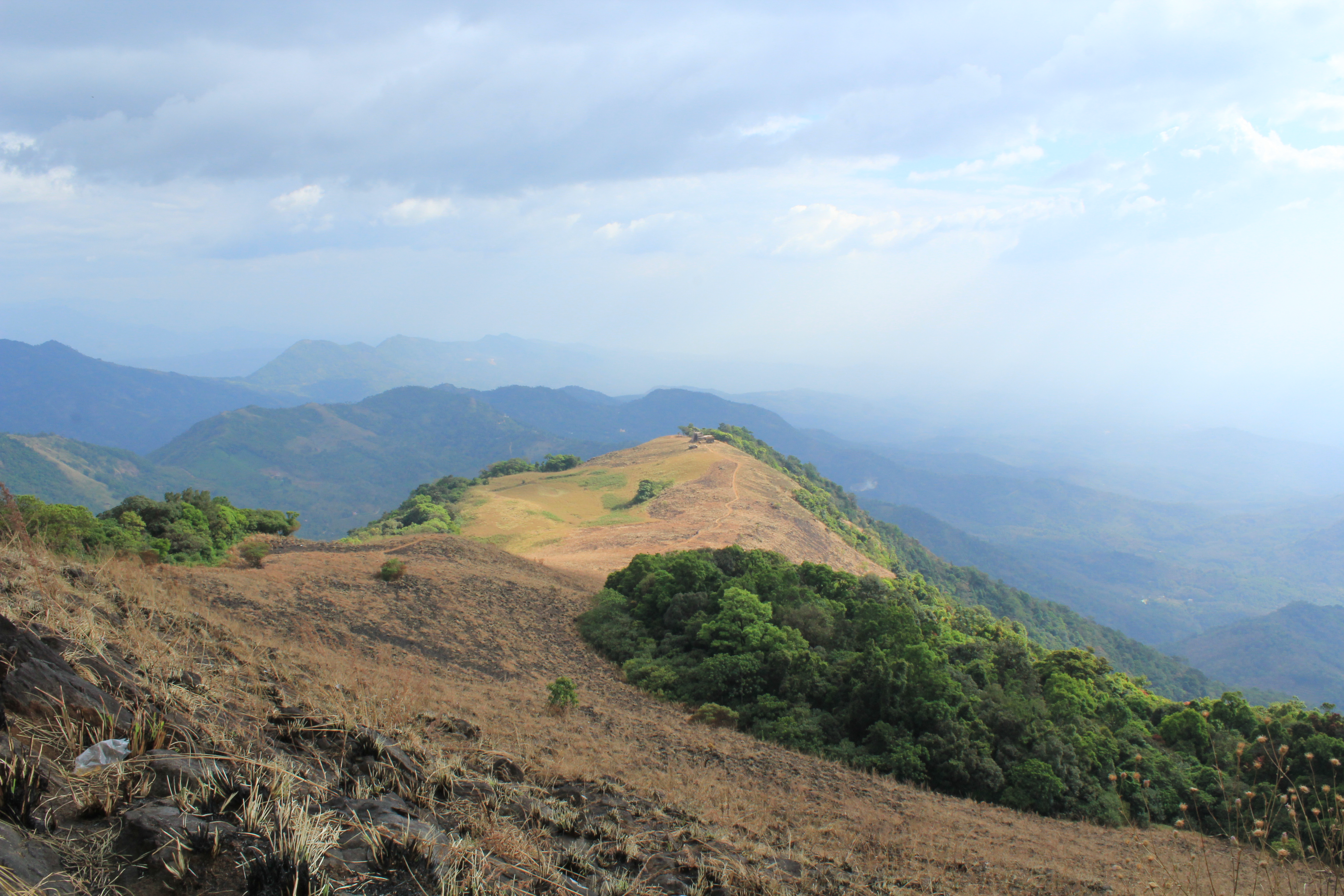
- Paithalmala

Highest point
- Elevation: 1,371.6 m (4,500 ft)
- Coordinates: 12°10′20″N 75°34′00″E

Naming
- English translation: പൈതൽമല
- Language of name: Malayalam

Geography
- Location within Kerala Location within India
- Location: Taliparamba, Kannur, Kerala, India
- Parent range: Western Ghats

Geology
- Mountain type: Tourism

Climbing
- Easiest route: From Potenplave, via Kudiyanmala

Paithalmala is a hill station in the Kannur district of Kerala in India, located near Pottenplave. At a height of 4500 ft above from sea level, it is the highest geographic peak in Kannur. It is located 40 km from Taliparamba and 65 km from Kannur. Nestled in the Kerala Karnataka border near to Kodagu forests, it lies in the Western Ghats.

== Trekking at Paithalmala ==
Paithalmala is a popular trekking destination. There are two trekking seasons at Paithalmala: monsoon and summer. Trekking in Paithalmala can be challenging due to frequent rain, leeches, and occasional elephant visits.

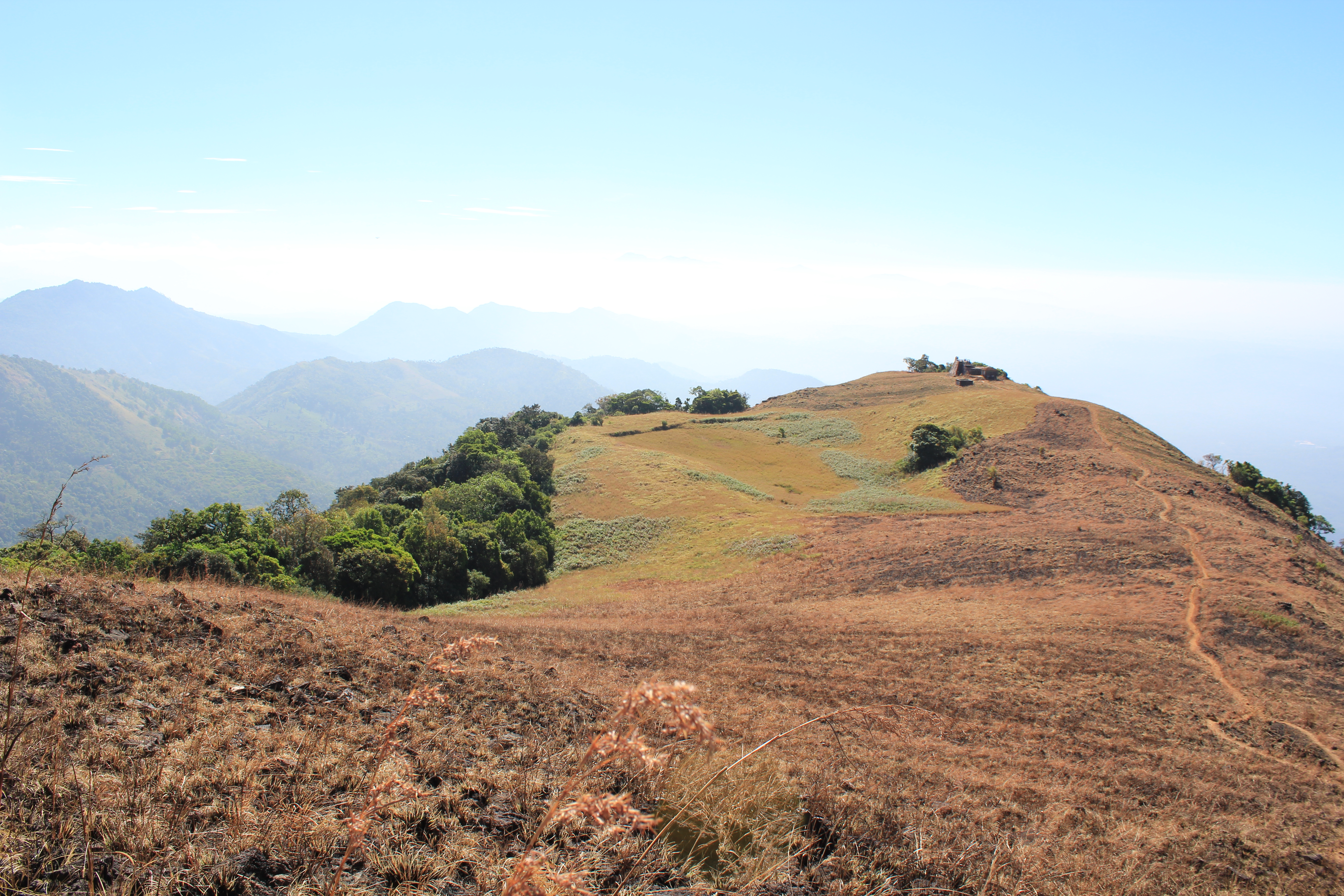
Paithalmala Hilltop: The observatory tower is seen at the extreme

Monsoon is followed by a cool climate in Paithalmala and the grass surrounding the hills grow to their fullest size, making it difficult to walk through. As they grow above seven feet, finding the regular way becomes a difficult task. By December, the forest caretakers set fire to the grass, taking care of the rest of the forest, to ease out the trekking experience. Soon after this, the hill becomes unsuitable to trek because of the black sooth formed but clears away after a couple of weeks. Most people generally trek between January and March.

== Tourism ==
There is an observatory tower made by the department of tourism at the hilltop which can be reached after a 45 min walk from the Paithal valley. Trekking starts through the dense forest followed by the plain grass land on the hill top. At the highest point of the observatory, the observer can see more than half the area of Kannur district.

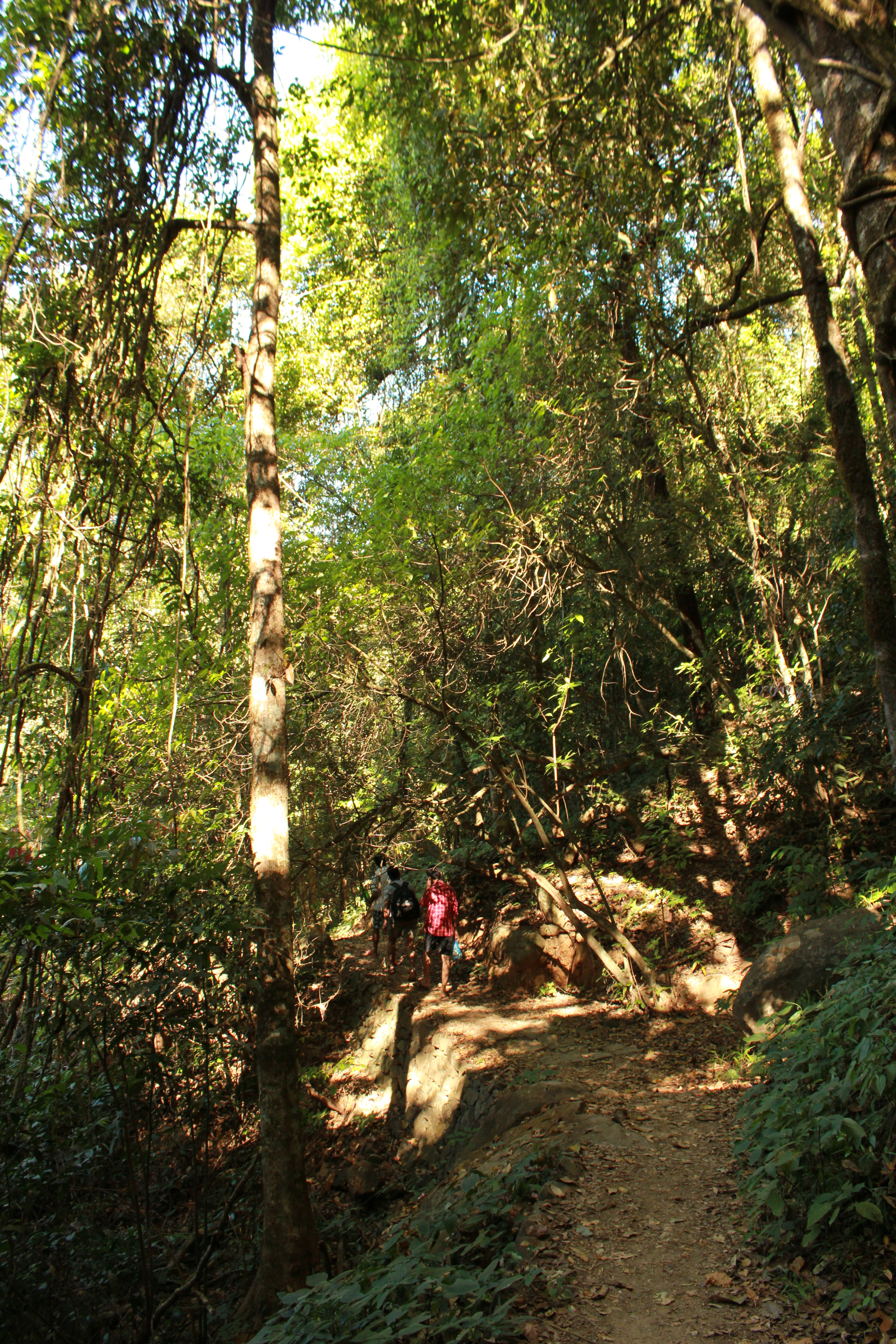
Forest trail towards the hill

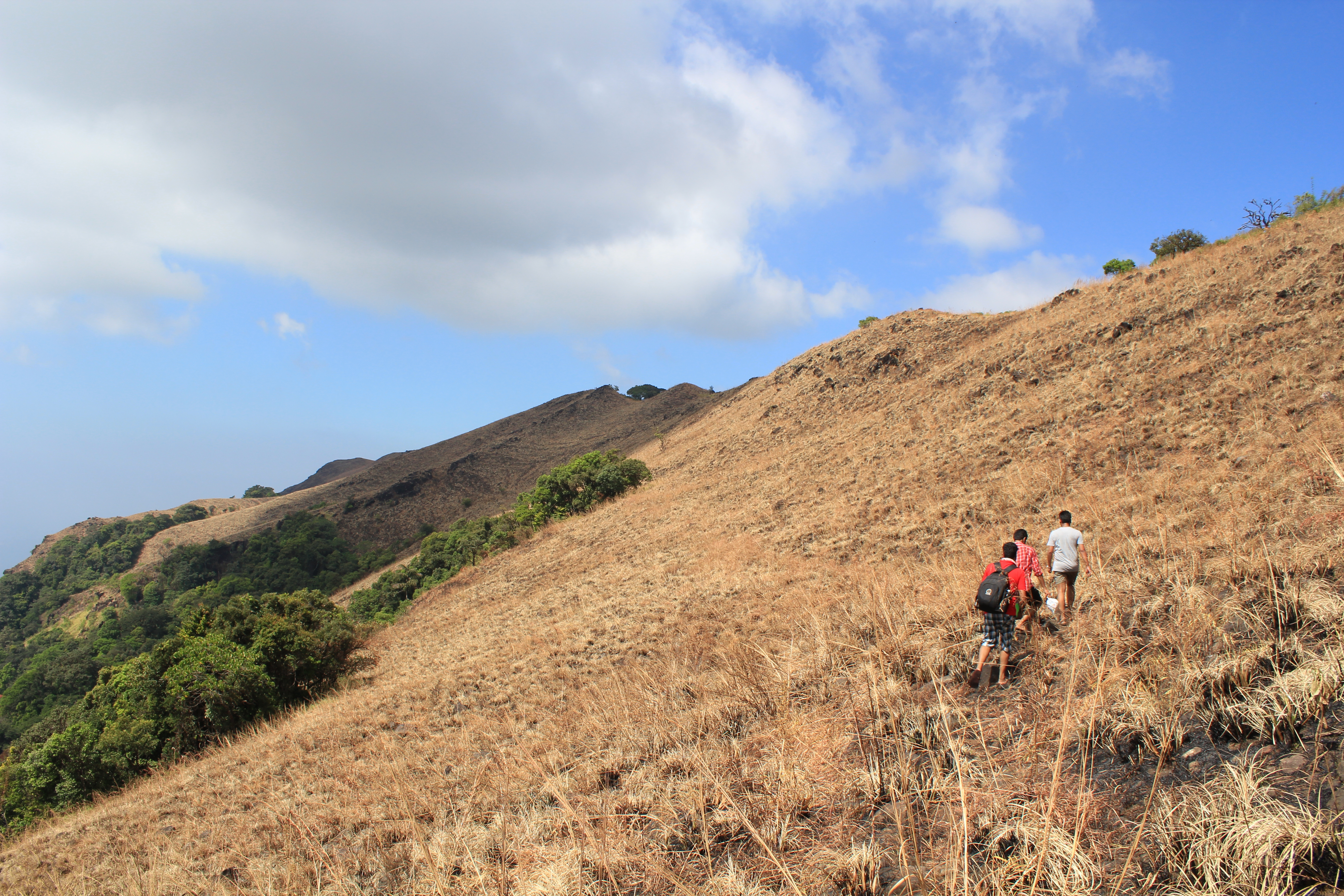
Trekkers at paithal hills

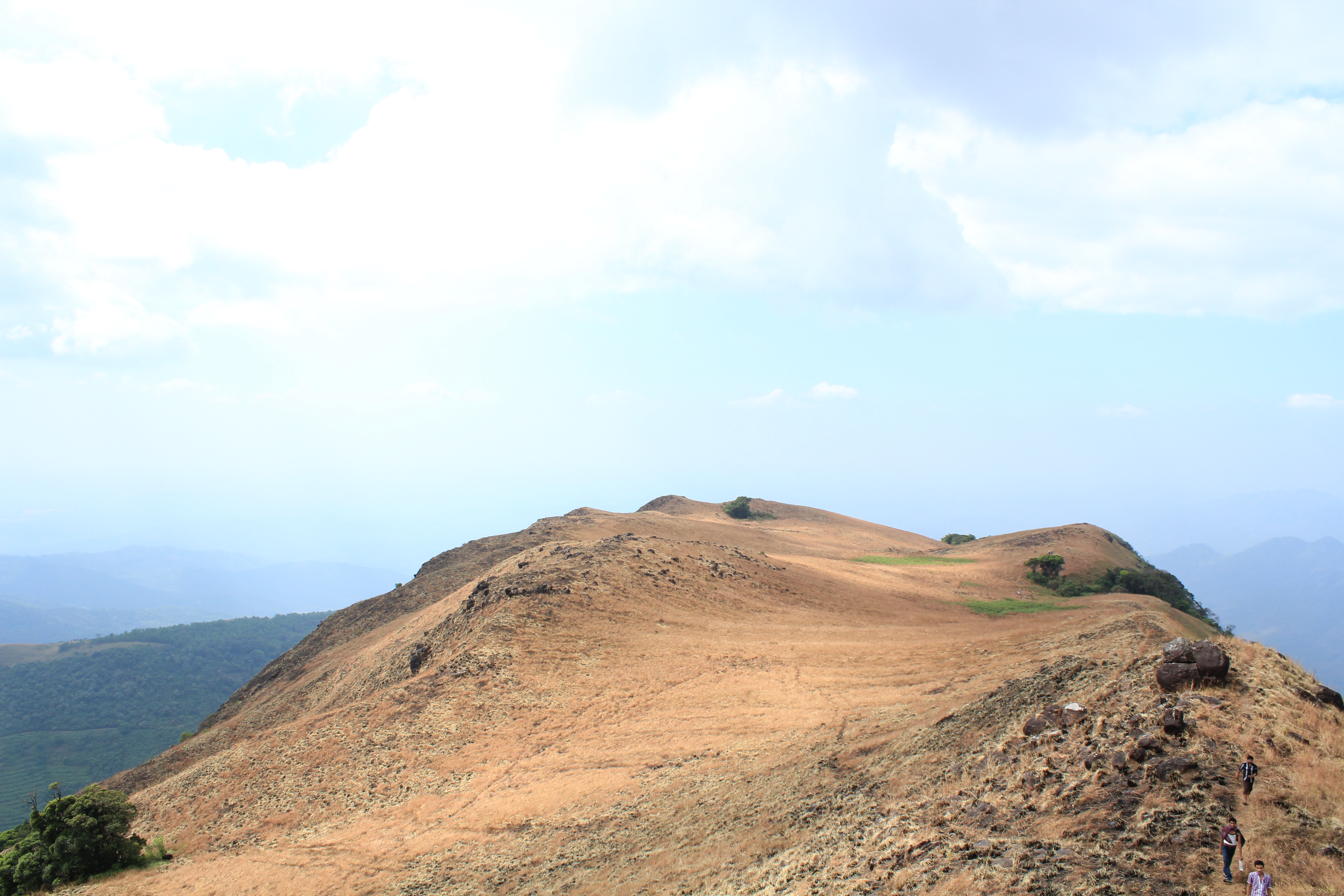
Scenic view from the hilltop

The main part of the trek is considered to be the walk from the observatory tower to the thick forest where trail from Kappimala ends, where the Coorg forest and Paithal valley can be seen. Mobile networks other than BSNL are not available in the vicinity.

== Problems with Pollution ==
Since accessibility to it is limited, Paithalmala is one of the few places in Kerala where nature is largely unaffected by human invasion. Recently however, visitors have increasingly tended to use it as a drinking spot. The observatory tower is in poor condition as its walls and barricades are broken or destroyed, and the surroundings of the tower are littered with beer bottles and plastic items. The hill top remains largely non-polluted and visitors are advised to preserve it.

== See also ==
- Kudianmala
- Naduvil
- Alakkode
