= Amboori =

- Village
- Location in Kerala, India Amboori (India)
- Coordinates: 8.47°N 77.19°E
- Country: India
- State: Kerala
- District: Thiruvananthapuram
- Talukas: Kattakkada

Government
  - Type: Panchayat
  - Body: Amboori Grama Panchayat

Area
  - Total: 81 km^{2} (31 sq mi)

Population (2011)
  - Total: 15,920
  - Density: 200/km^{2} (510/sq mi)

Languages
  - Official: Malayalam, English
- Time zone: UTC+5:30 (IST)
- PIN: 695505
- Telephone code: 35567443
- Vehicle registration: KL-74
- Sex ratio: 1072 ♂/1000♀

Amboori is a panchayath in Kattakkada Taluk of Thiruvananthapuram district in the state of Kerala in India. It is situated 38 km south-east of capital city Trivandrum.

As per the 2011 Census, Amboori village has a population of 15,920, of which 4464 are males and 4785 are females. The population of children aged 0–6 is 866, which makes up 9.36% of the total population of the village. The average sex ratio of Amboori village is 1072, lower than the Kerala state average of 1084. The child sex ratio for Amboori, as per the census, is 977, which is higher than the Kerala average of 964.

Amboori village has a lower literacy rate than Kerala. In 2011, the literacy rate of Amboori village was 92.37% compared to 94.00% in Kerala. In Amboori male literacy stands at 94.34% while the female literacy rate was 90.54%.

An important ethnic group in the area is the Kanikar tribe; about 1200 members of this tribe live in the area.

Amboori is 40 km (25 mi) from the Agastiya mountain peak where Sage Agastiya, the founder of Ayurveda, is believed to have built his hermitage.

== Geography ==
Amboori is situated in the southern tip of western ghats, surrounded by hills and is near to kattakkada. South east of Amboori is the state of Tamil Nadu. It is surrounded by the grama panchayaths of Vellarada, Aryancode, and Kallikkadu in the south, south-west and west respectively. The eastern part is covered by densely forested Neyyar Wildlife Sanctuary. Amboori is well known for its high-yielding rubber plantations, however, the area also cultivates coconut, pepper, herbs, and medicinal plants. Amboori contains a plantation of holy Rudraksha (Eleocarpus Spaericus) trees. Adjoining Amboori is the Neyyar Wildlife Sanctuary that is separated from the populated area by the catchment area of Neyyar Reservoir.

In the western hills of Amboori there is a large boulder called the Dravyappara (the treasure rock). It is believed that Raja of Venad, later Thiruvithamcore or Travancore, on his exile, spent his days on the top of this rock. There are 72 steps carved on the side of the boulder allowing one to ascend to the top. The height of the Dravyappara is approximately 700 ft from its base and approximately 1500 ft above sea level. There is a cave temple at the top of Dravayappara.

Amboori has witnessed a large landslide in 2001 which claimed the life of 39 people. The tragedy occurred when a hill collapsed on to a house where there was a family gathering.

== History ==
There are many stories about how Amboori got its name. The first one is that the tribal settlers had a rice variety which will flower and ripen in a single day! It is called "Annoori Nellu". Later Annoori became Amboori. There is another story which is related to Chadachi Marthandan Pillai, who was a great archer of King Marthanda Varma. Once, the Chadachi Marthandan Pillai was participating in an archery competition in a place called Ottashekharamangalam. He shot an Arrow (Ambu) which landed in a tree at a far away place. While removing (oori) the arrow from the tree, he has placed a special marking in it. Later the surrounding area has known as Amboori (Removed the Arrow).

Amboori was inhabited by members of the Kanikar tribe since time immemorial. Around 1200 members are still living here with all cooperation to new settlers. During the year 1729, a princely state came up in the name of Thiruvithamcoor or Travencore under the rule of King Marthandavarma. The King had several enemies like "Ettuveettil Pillamar", who was trying to eliminate him. To escape from them, the King stayed in various places like Ammatha, Pathukaani, Kottamanpuram, and Meenmutty in Neyyar River belt. At that time, the Kani tribe was taking care of his safety and security. At a time, the tribe took him to a large boulder called the Dravyappara (the treasure rock), which is approximately 700 ft from its base and 1500 ft above sea level.

The King was very much pleased with the tribes courtesy and the way they took care of him. Before leaving this place to Tamil Nadu, the King has allotted the tribe approximately 36000 hectors of land in chembu pattayam, totally exempting from land tax, this area mostly falls under Neyyatinkara and Nedumangadu Taluks, Amboori too falls under that stretch of land.

Amboori became quickly famous after the Second World War. The princely state of Thiruvithamcoor or Travencore has experienced severe famine. Hence, the King has allowed Saint Thomas Christians of Kottayam region to settle in uncultivated Western Ghats ranges. The announcement from the King resulted in migration to this area in 1930. The new settlers used to walk from Kattakada to reach Pantha which is the early settlement of Christians.

Kochupuraykkal Kuryachan from Cheruvandoor, Punchaal Chacko, Thomman Mullankuzhiyil, and Maylakkuzhi Kutty from Anikkadu, Vattanthottiyil Mathan Vaidyar and his brother Devasya from Mattakkara were the first one to reach this place.

Even though they could start farming after clearing the forest, fighting with Animals, and some local goons, they couldn't take it further with harsh nature and diseases like Malaria. Mullankuzhiyil Thomman died in July 1931 and he has been laid to rest at Mylakkara Church. Other people also lost their health and slowly they left the area.

The second migration started in 1932 when a group of 50 families from the central Travencore reached here. They stayed in Tree Houses and started farming. Tragedy stuck again in the form of Malaria. Many lost their lives and some left to better places. The families to stayed back had a real tough time in the middle of the jungle. Finally, only 3 families – Mullankuzhi, Mylakkuzhi, and Paranjattu- were alive.

Another migration of around 75 families started in 1937 and ended up in 1944. The families spread from Panthaplavu to Karumamkulam area. Their experience was also not different. Most of them lost their dear once'. Finally, 13 families – including Chirakkathottil Devasya, Valliyanippuram Paily, Moonanal Families, Meeshouseppu, Muthiyamala Samuel, Puthenparambil Mamchan, Thuruthel Kunjouseppu, Kalayil Unnichettan- left behind.

Most of the first migrators settled in a place called Pantha which has better water sources for farming. Patha is located north of Amboori and near Mayam. Even though most of the people are Catholics, they didn't have a priest to take care of their spiritual needs. Rev. Fr. Adeyadathos O C D (Muthiyavila Valyachan) has reached there and started taking care of everyone without religious boundaries.

It is learned from the elders, that Fr. Adeyadathoos had miraculous powers. After he finished the house visits, the area was covered by high wind and the problems with several diseases like malaria came to an end. The children born after this period was alive and started growing up. Before that, all the newborns used to die.

Fr. Adeyadathoos has constructed a Church – St. Mary's Church in Mayam, which is the first Church in this area. Since, there was an order of the Catholic hierarchy that if any new church is constructed, it should have an educational institution as well, they have also started St. Mary's School in Mayam. This school also the first such institution in this area.

However, the decision to construct a dam in Neyyar River, forced the people of Pantha, mostly Syrian Christians, Pulayas, and Parayas to resettle leaving all their lively hood. Most of them resettled in Amboori.

By seeing the new gazette in 1949–50 to convert Amboori area into a fully agricultural sector, more families reached here and most of them were Christians. For the new migrants to stay temporarily, a shed has been constructed by Kottakkuzhiyil Joseph Vaidyan and the first Holy Mass was celebrated in this shed by Fr. Adeyadathoos. So, the history of Amboori is the history of St.George's Church too. Here it started after the final Holy Mass celebrated at Vettukallel Chacko's new house, celebrating Holy Mass at an individual's house has stopped.

To have a new shed for the church, a committee has taken charge under the leadership of Thadikkattu Varki Mani as Convenor and Odalaniyil Thomas, Odanalyil Joseph, Nadackal Varkki, Kudilil Kuryakkos, Edathattel Varki, Pallithazhathu Chacko, Muttuchira Chacko, Karuvayil Mathew, Moonnanayil Kochu Varki, Vettukallel Joseph, Vettukallel Chacko, Karimbaniyil Devasya Chandi, Koolipparambil Mathayi, Kudilil Agasthy, Valliyanippuram Paili, Mundolikkal Joseph and V T Antony Vellappallil were members in this committee. The first church had 40 ft length and 20 ft width. By this time around 85 families newly arrived.

The church shed was also used as a school. Kottur Kuriyakkos, who was appointed as Pastor in the Church was also started teaching here. Anchupankil Thomas, Kesari, Nadackal Abraham, Thekkel Philip, V A Joseph were also Teachers in this primary school.

While taking a survey of Amboori, the faithful decided to shift the church a new place which is bought from Pattani A Varkki Vakkeel, who had around 200 acres of land in Amboori. Half acres of land had been bought by Rs. 150/- and another half acres he had donated. A new shed also came up for school.

In 1955, Rev. Fr. Joseph Malipparambil has been appointed as the Vicar of the Church. Fr. Jacob Thottanani, Fr. Losious, and Fr. Antony Puthoor helped him. Their combined effort has changed the face of Amboori. St. George LP School building has been completed. A new building for St. Thomas UP School has been erected and approval for the Schools has been received from Government. They also concentrated to develop nearby places like Arukani, Netta, Thekkupara, Dalmukham, Vavodu, and Venuthadam. Amboori has got a Post office in 10-07-1955, Roads linking Kudappanamoodu-Koottappu-Amboori, Vazhichal-Amboori, Aanamukham-Amboori, Pantha-Amboori, Thekkupara-Amboori has been developed with the help of all locals. During this time, Amboori also had a Library and Sports Club.

In 1961, under N E S Block, Perunkadavila a Health Center & Midwifery started here. In 1962, a private market established in Koottappu. The Amboori Co-operative Bank has started functioning from 29-03-1965. A Milk Society, Dairy Farm, Poultry Farm, Bee Farm, and Bamboo Societies established during the 1965–69 period by Fr. Antony Puthoor.

Between 1966–70, the U P School has been upgraded to High School, Federal Bank started its operation, Printing Press and Good Samaritan Hospital started functioning in Amboori. Electricity reached Amboori in 5.7.1975. Amboori became a Panchayat in 27-12-1975. In 1-1-1979, the first telephone connection established. The First Bus Service from Neyyattinkara Depot to Koottappu via Pantha and Amboori started in 19-5-1976. First Grade Electricity Overseer Office started in 4-11-1987, Village office started in 30-05-1986, and Veterinary Hospital started in 6-2-1987.

Source: St. George's Church's Souvenir – 1988

== Educational institutions ==
- St. Thomas Higher Secondary School, both English and Malayalam medium
- St. Joseph's primary school
- St. Mary's Upper Primary School, Mayam
- Tribal Primary School, Puravimalai
- Kovilloor LPS Kannannoor, one of the first LP schools in Amboory area
- Govt. UP School, Kuttamala
- Mar Baselieus English Medium School, Kuttamala
- St. Mary's LP School, Thekkupara, S.H. Nursery school Thekkuppara
- Industrial Training Centre for Scheduled Tribes, Kuttamala
- Koottappu Gopalan Memorial Library and Research Institute, Koottappu

== Legends ==
Legend has it that the poor citizens of Amboory used to get small loans from an unnamed goddess (spirit) of the Dravyappara. A request for money was to be said aloud standing next to a large granite door on the northeastern side of the rock. On approval of the loan by the devata, a granite bucket on the southeastern side of the door would be filled with the requested amount. The citizen was expected to remit the same amount in a reasonable time frame by dropping the money in the bucket and pronouncing aloud that the money was deposited.

It was an unspoken rule that no one should look inside the door; however, one day a young man, while returning the loan of his father, waited to see who the lender was. Eventually, he saw a beautiful nude woman come out, take the money, and turn to go inside. However, as the story goes, she sees the young man and, instantaneously, the door of the Dravyappara closed forever with a large thunderclap.

Some villagers believe that one day the door will open again, and they perform pujas (worship rituals) regularly on the southeastern side of the Dravyappara where there are three narrow entrances.

The Kani Tribe of Amboory have another legend in which one of the oldest devotees of the Dravyappara received a divine vision of a Devi (goddess) while performing his puja. She reportedly told him, "I will open the door for you provided you can sow and reap the rice in a single day" from a certain paddy field. However, the tribe has no conclusion to the story.
