= Kuttichal =

Kuttichal Mannoorkkara
- village
- Location in Kerala, India Kuttichal (India)
- Coordinates: 8.5677599°N 77.0906782°E
- Country: India
- State: Kerala
- District: Thiruvananthapuram
- Talukas: kattakada

Government
  - Type: village
  - Body: Kuttichal Panchayat

Languages
  - Official: Malayalam, English
- Time zone: UTC+5:30 (IST)
- PIN: 695574
- Telephone code: 0472
- Vehicle registration: KL-21, KL -74
- Sex ratio: ♂/♀
- Civic agency: Kuttichal Panchayat

Kuttichal (formerly known as Mannoorkara) is a village in Thiruvananthapuram district in the state of Kerala, India. Kuttichal is part of Kattakada Taluk, Vellanad block panchayath and Aruvikkara Legislative Assembly.

Kuttichal is under the foothills of the Agastyarkudam of the Sahya Mountains.
