= Kudappanakunnu =

- neighbourhood
- Location in Kerala, India
- Coordinates: 8.555983°N 76.961030°E
- Country: India
- State: Kerala
- District: Thiruvananthapuram
- Talukas: Thiruvananthapuram

Languages
  - Official: Malayalam, English
- Time zone: UTC+5:30 (IST)
- PIN: 695043
- Nearest city: Thiruvananthapuram
- Literacy: 95%

Kudappanakunnu is the headquarters of Thiruvananthapuram district in the Indian state of Kerala.

Thiruvananthapuram Doordarshan Kendra and the District collectors office are the major landmarks here. Vazhayila, Nalanchira, Muttada and Mannanthala are some of the adjoining areas.

Kunnath Mahadeva Temple is an ancient Shiva temple situated in Kudappanakunnu. The temple is regarded as one of the existing 108 ancient Shiva Temples of Kerala Worshiped by Parashurama.

Special bus services have been started to connect Kudappanakunnu with city center and nearby areas. Thiruvananthapuram Central Railway Station is the nearest rail station. Trivandrum International Airport is the nearest airport.

== Etymology ==
The name Kudappanakunnu comes from three words "Kuda", "Pana" and "Kunnu" meaning a hilly area occupied by Kudapanas, a variety of palm tree. Kudapana in turn means "Kuda" = Umbrella + "Pana" = palm tree. Kudappanakunnu has been widely regarded as a beautiful and peaceful locality in Thiruvananthapuram city.

== Prominent institutions ==
- Civil Station
- Doordarshan Kendram
- National Coir Research & Management Institute (NCRMI)
- The Regional Poultry Farm and the District Livestock Farm
- Visweswara Institute for Competitive Exams
- Corporation Zonal Office
- Govt. Veterinary Dispensary
- B S N L Exchange & BSNL Customer Service Centre
- KSEB office
- Government Homeopathy Dispensary.
- KSFE
- Kerala State Youth Welfare Board

== Educational Institutions ==
- Concordia Lutheran School and Church
- MaryGiri School EMHSS
- Kudappanakunnu Govt LP School
- St Thomas Residential School, Mukkola

== Financial institutions ==
- Kudappanakunnu Sub Post Office
- State Bank of India
- Bank Of Maharashtra
- Muthoot Fincorp
- KSFE
- Manappuram Gold
- Peroorkada Service Co-operative Bank
- Canara bank

== Religious ==
- Kunnath Sree Mahadeva Temple
- Kudappanakunnu Devi Temple
- Perapooru Devi Temple
- Kunnumpuram Chamundi Temple
- Manaykkakam Mahadeva Temple
- Thalayapooru Devi Temple
- Concordia Lutheran Church Kudappanakunnu
- St. Gregorious Orthodox Church
- CSI Church Kudappanakunnu
- Seventh-day Adventist Church
- Fathima Matha Church Marygiri
- Sri Radha Krishna Temple(ISKCON)

== Sub-roads ==
- Panchayath Office Lane
- Jayaprakash Lane
- Ganga Nagar
- Vivekananda Nagar
- Chandana Gardens
- Darshan Nagar
- VP Thampi Road
- MLA Road
- Concordia lane
- NCC Road( Made BY NCC Cadets Camp At Concordia Lutheran School)
- Deya Nagar Residence Association Road
- Devi Lane
- Ganga Lane

== Famous personalities ==
- Manikuttan

== Nearby places ==
Peroorkada, Mukkola, Mannanthala, Pathiripalli, Nalanchira, Vazhayila, Perappuru,
