= Mar Baselios College of Engineering and Technology =

College in Kerala, India

Mar Baselios College of Engineering and Technology (Autonomous)
- Other name: MBCET (AUTONOMOUS)
- Motto: Duc In Altum
- Motto in English: Leading to the Heights of Excellence
- Established: July 2002
- Religious affiliation: Syro-Malankara Catholic Church
- Academic affiliations: APJ Abdul Kalam Technological University; AICTE
- Principal: Abraham T. Mathew
- Director: Samuel Irenios (Vice Chairman of Malankara Catholic Educational Society)
- Patron: Cyril Baselios Catholicos
- Students: 2662
- Undergraduates: 2410
- Postgraduates: 252
- Location: Thiruvananthapuram, Kerala, India; 8.5520°N 76.9379°E
- Colours: Blue & white
- Website: www.mbcet.ac.in

Mar Baselios College of Engineering and Technology (Autonomous), is an engineering educational institution located at Thiruvananthapuram, Kerala, India offering engineering education and research. The college is located on a hillock in the Bethany Hills. The educational Institution is situated along the way from Kesavadasapuram to Mannanthala route, this road further extends to north of Kerala as the MC Road.

The college is a part of the Mar Ivanios Vidyanagar Campus which has 22 educational institutes, including primary, secondary and higher secondary schools, training institutes and an arts college. The college which started operations in July 2002 is affiliated to the APJ Abdul Kalam Technological University.

It is one of the top ranked colleges in Kerala for engineering. All B.Tech. programmes have been accredited by the National Board of Accreditation w.e.f 1 July 2016.

== Academics ==
The following courses in MBCET are approved by the All India Council for Technical Education (AICTE) and sanctioned by the Government of Kerala, leading to the B.Tech. Degree of the University of Kerala and Kerala Technological University. It has an annual intake of 600 students for B.Tech. courses. The distribution of seats are as follows.

- Civil Engineering : 120 seats
- Computer Science & Engineering : 120 seats
- Electrical & Electronics Engineering : 120 seats
- Electronics & Communications Engineering : 120 seats
- Mechanical Engineering : 90 seats

MBCET offers M.Tech. programmes in the CSE, EEE, ME, CE and ECE Departments.

=== Computer Science and Engineering ===
The Department of Computer Science and Engineering offers 4 years undergraduate program leading to the award of B.Tech. Degree in Computer Science and Engineering. Every year 120 students are admitted to the Program.

- Head of the Department: Dr. Tessy Mathew
- Year in which the department began: 2002

=== Electrical and Electronics Engineering ===
Electrical & Electronics engineering deals with the generation, transfer and conversion of electric power with the aid of mechanical, electronic circuits and computer systems. (Batch 2016–2020)

- Head of the Department: Mr. Shajilal A S
- Year in which the department began: 2002

=== Electronics and Communication Engineering ===
This department deals with the teaching of electronic engineering such as analog circuits, digital circuits, VLSI, and solid state conductors, and communication engineering, networking, and digital signal processing.

- Dean of Research and Development: Sakuntala. S. Pillai
- Head of the Department: Dr. Jayakumari J.
- Year in which the department began: 2002
- Student body: Electronic Association (EA), IEEE

Mr. Joji John Varghese was selected as the winner in Electronics Skills from Kerala as part of Nypunyam 2015 and won first prize worth Rs 1,50,000/-.
Student project gets funding from Startup Village and Kerala Chapter of IEEE Communication Society.

=== Mechanical Engineering ===
The Mechanical Engineering department of Mar Baselios College has various contributions and had students develop environment friendly engines. The batch of 2005 had introduced the G-Mech or "Generation Mech" as a student body to unite future mechanical engineering students and act as a branch student body.

- Head of the Department: Rajesh T N
- Year in which the department began: 2005
- Student Body: Association of Mechanical Engineers (G-Mech)

==== List of notable mechanical projects in MBCET ====
Batch	Project	Specific client(s)	Key factor	Project completion
2015	Plastic waste disposal	N/A	IEEE Award	2015
2009	Thermo-acoustic refrigerator	N/A	High COP attained	2013
2008	Coconut de-husker	N/A	Speedy and cost effective	2012
2007	Multi-purpose farming machine	N/A	Cheaper than market	2011
2006	Compressed air engine	N/A	Zero carbon emission (patent pending)	2010
2005	V II 400 redesign	Kerala Automobiles Limited (KAL)	KAL accepted the redesign	2009
2005	Diesel two-wheeler	N/A	( Lower Carbon Emission)	2009

=== Civil Engineering ===
- Head of the Department: Dr. Jisha S V
- Year in which the department began: 2005
- Student Body: Civil Engineering Students Association (CESA)
- UTBHAV – Annual Technical fete by Civil Engineering Department

=== Basic Sciences ===
The department offers courses in engineering mathematics, engineering physics and engineering chemistry within the engineering curricula. There are no students directly under this department. However, there are lectures and seminars conducted by these department to all students in the first year of Engineering.

- Head of the Department: Cherian
- Year in which the department began: 2002

== Governance ==
Mar Baselios College of Engineering and Technology is administered by the Major Archdiocese of Thiruvananthapuram through the Malankara Catholic Educational Society, a society found by the diocese exclusively for the formation of educational technical and other institutions to benefit the community and the public in general.

The society was registered in 1996, under the Travancore – Cochin Literary Scientific and Charitable Societies Registration Act XII of 1955. The major Archdiocese of Thiruvananthapuram under which the society functions, has established several primary, secondary and higher secondary schools, nursing college, technical college, NAAC 'A' grade training college and other colleges.

== Admissions ==
Candidates for admission to the B.Tech. degree courses will have passed the higher secondary examination of Kerala with Mathematics, Physics and Chemistry as subjects or any other examination accepted as equivalent by the Kerala Technological University. Pass in Higher Secondary Examination of the Board of Higher Secondary Education of Kerala or an examination recognized equivalent thereto with at least Fifty percent marks in Mathematics separately and Fifty percent marks in Mathematics, Physics and Chemistry / equivalent subjects put together or equivalent grade. Candidates should qualify in the Engineering Entrance Exam conducted by the Commissioner of Entrance Exams, Govt. of Kerala.

== Facilities ==
=== Library ===
The backbone of MBCET is the library. There are 21,000 engineering books for the six engineering branches. A periodical section has 190 national and international journals. Back volumes of journals, question papers etc. are available for reference. MBCET Library Portal
Award for MBCET Library portal

=== Hostel ===
MBCET's men's hostel is Mar Aprem Hostel and it is located behind the college. The ladies stay at the foot of the hillock at the Sacred Heart Hostel along with students from other institutions in the Mar Ivanios Vidyanagar.

=== Other facilities ===
- Amenities center
- Chapel
- Canteen
- Central Computing Facility

== NATIONAL SERVICE SCHEME (NSS) ==
The NSS unit of the college is a very active one which does a number of Social Service activities in and out of the college. It Conducts campaigns to make students aware of the society. Assistant professor Sreeju Nair S B is the program officer of the unit 706, Jetcin and Insha are the volunteer Secretaries of the unit.

== Conferences and workshops ==
Design and Innovation Workshop by MIT Media Lab

The Massachusetts Institute of Technology (MIT) Media Lab is an interdisciplinary research laboratory devoted to projects at the convergence of technology, multimedia and design. The MIT Media Lab joins hands with Mar Baselios College of Engineering and Technology (MBT) to host a Design and Innovation Workshop from 30 July to 1 August 2013 at MBT Campus. The workshop has been designed around the MIT Media Lab philosophy, where the future is lived, not imagined. The workshop aims to share MIT's interdisciplinary research, design, and development cultures—hands-on creative learning (learning-by-doing) and "hacking" (rapid prototyping).

International Conference on Green Technologies 2012

International Conference on Green Technologies (ICGT12) was organized by Mar Baselios College of Engineering and Technology, Trivandrum, jointly with University of Dayton, USA during 18–20 December 2012 at Mar Baselios College of Engineering and Technology, Trivandrum. The Conference was technically sponsored by IEEE EDS India Chapter and IEEE Kerala Section. The Conference was inaugurated by Honorable Minister for Education Sri P K Abdu Rabb and was presided by Samuel Irenios, Auxiliary Bishop, Archdiocese of Trivandrum.

During the three days of the Conference, the Research and Development activities in all Engineering fields viz. Civil, Computer Science and IT, Electrical, Electronic and Mechanical Engineering related to Green Technologies were discussed. The keynote address "Alternative Energy Sources: A Practical Perspective" was delivered by R. Unnikrishnan, Dean, California State University, Fullerton, USA.

Organ Donation Camp(Dec 2015)

Mohanlal in 2015 took part in the 'Organ Donation Campaign' organized by Mar Baselious College. Mar Baselious College frequently conducts such programs that involves the society and are useful for the humankind. Mohanlal declared MBCET as the first organ donation friendly campus.

== Professional student bodies ==
The college shows keen interest in developing a professional caliber among the students. This was done with the help of various international organisations forming student bodies with the college. Mar Baselios College in association with the Institution of Electrical and Electronic Engineers (IEEE), Kerala circle, Computer Society of India, Thiruvananthapuram chapter, and the Institution of Electronics and Telecommunication Engineers (IETE) had organised national conference on communication systems and networks (CoMNeT- 2010). The Mar Baselios College in association with the Institution of Electrical and Electronic Engineers (IEEE), Kerala circle, Computer Society of India, Thiruvananthapuram chapter, has also conducted a national conference on broadband technologies in 2008.

=== Computer Society of India ===
The college is an institutional member of the Computer Society of India. The CSI Student Branch of Mar Baselios College of Engineering & Technology was inaugurated on 24 September 2004. Over the years, the CSI branch has proved itself to be the most active association in the college. It is also the biggest student branch in the Kerala state, boasting 153 members.

The CSI branch has been conducting an annual technical quiz competition under the name BYTES. CSI has in its own way been a trend setter in the matter of conducting events regularly. The branch also had the privilege of hosting the State Level Student Convention in 2006.

An important event and a milestone in the history of the CSI Student Chapter was the 26th National Student Convention – NSC 2010 that the Mar Baselios Student Branch hosted in association with Trivandrum Chapter of CSI from 2–4 September 2010.

The CSI student branch of MBCET was selected as the Best Student Branch from among engineering colleges in Kerala, Tamil Nadu and Pondicherry for the year 2010–2011. This is the second consecutive year that the student branch has received this award.

=== Indian Society for Technical Education ===
The college is an institutional member of the ISTE since 2005. A chapter of the society is functioning in the college with 37 members.

=== IEEE student branch ===
An IEEE student body was set up on 14 February 2006. A number of students are involved in the activities conducted by the IEEE MBCET Student Branch.

Deepthi Anna George, student of Computer Science branch has been selected to receive the prestigious IEEE Computer Society – Richard E. Merwin Scholarship – 2011 in recognition of her exemplary involvement in student chapter activities and excellent academic achievement. She is one among fourteen students chosen from colleges and universities throughout the world for this scholarship. The scholarship includes an award and amount of $2,500.

=== Finishing school ===
In alliance with EDS Technologies, Mar Baselios College of Engineering and Technology has set up a finishing school to provide industry specific technical training in Product Lifecycle Management (PLM).

=== Green Dream ===
An environmental initiative was undertaken by students of Mar Baselios College of Engineering along with nine other college to form Green Dream. The group along with UST Global and "TidyCity" ran a clean-up drive on Veli beach.

== Developer Communities ==
=== Google Developer Student Clubs ===
Google Developer Student Clubs Mar Baselios College of Engineering and Technology or GDSC MBCET is a student run community, powered by Google Developers. GDSC MBCET was introduced in 2019. GDSC MBCET focuses on helping students adapt to new developer technology trends and build projects, by collaborative learning. GDSC MBCET is free and open to anyone and everyone, who is interested in trying out new developer technologies.

== Sports and College Festivals ==
=== Crossroads ===
Mar Baselios College of Engineering and Technology (MBCET) holds an annual technical and cultural event named CROSSROADS. This is conducted in the month of February or March. It is often a three- or four-day event.

=== TEDxMBCET ===
TEDxMBCET was first organized by the Department of Computer Science and Engineering (Batch 2015–2019) in February 2019. Speakers included Karikku founder – Nikhil Prasad, playback singer Job Kurian, and others.

=== Hash ===
Hash is the annual inter college technical fest conducted by Department of Computer Science and Engineering. It was first conducted in the year 2018. It is usually conducted in odd semesters.

=== Sports ===
Joji Varghese is the coach for the basketball team and is in charge of Physical Education.

==== Basketball ====
Mar Baselios College has a basketball team. This team has won several accolades and awards at various intra college basketball tournaments. It hosts the Baselios Trophy all-Kerala Professional Colleges Basketball Tournament.

===== Awards won by MBCET Basketball team =====
Year	Position	Tournament name	Scores	Last match against
2013	First	Don Bosco All-Kerala Basketball Tournament	69–67	Kerala Police
2013	First	Mar Baselios Trophy All-Kerala Basketball Tournament	64–47	Viswajyothi College of Engineering
2012	First	19th Viswappan Memorial All-Kerala Basketball Tournament	77–56	SB College (Changanassery)
2012	First	Mar Baselios Trophy All-Kerala Basketball Tournament	68–42	FISAT
2011	First	Kerala University Inter Collegiate Basketball Tournament	74–56	Mar Ivanios
2011	First	IV Marian All-Kerala Professional College Basketball Tournament	37–17	Marian College of Engineering
2011	First	Arena 2K11	32–12	Amal Jyothi College
2011	First	All-Kerala Professional Collegiate Basketball Tournament	64–49	FISAT
2010	First	Fisat Trophy All-Kerala Inter-collegiate Basketball Tournament	60–34	FISAT
2009	First	Mar Baselios Inter-collegiate Basketball Tournament	64–51	Marian College of Engineering

MBCET students part of Kerala State team for South Zone basketball championship.

==== Table tennis ====
Mar Baselios won awards in table tennis in Kerala University's inter-collegiate table tennis tournament held at the Government Engineering College in 2009.

==== Badminton ====
Mar Baselios Engineering College won the title in the Kerala University inter-collegiate women's badminton tournament held on 9 October 2012.

== College rating ==
Careers360 rates MBCET among the Top 10 Engineering Colleges in Kerala.

== Tallest Christ statue in India ==
33.5 feet-tall statue of Jesus Christ, the tallest Christ statue in the country, was unveiled and blessed by Major Archbishop of the Syro-Malankara Catholic Church Baselios Cleemis at the campus of Mar Baselios College of Engineering and Technology on 29 September 2012.
