= Madathara =

- Town
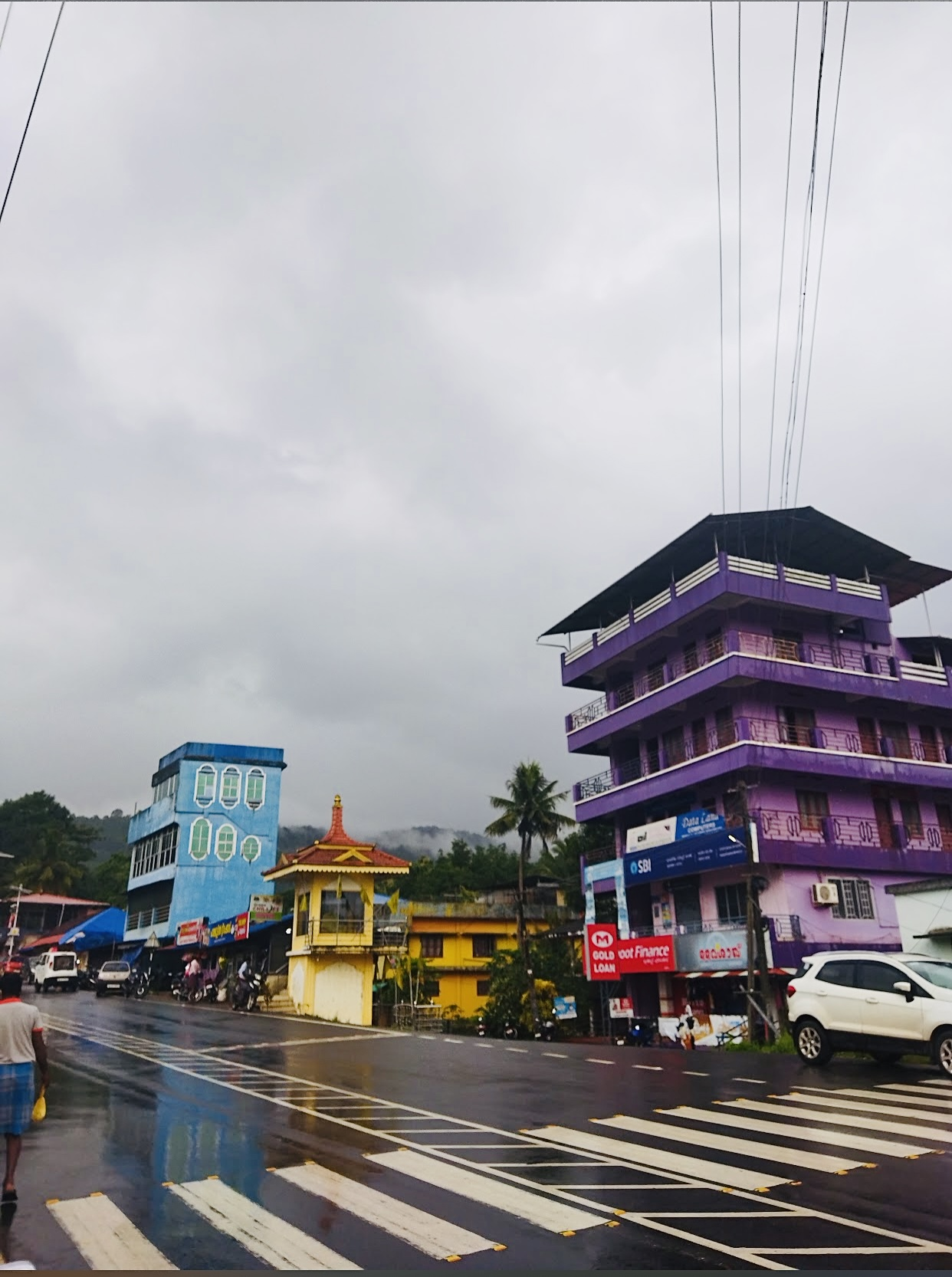
- Madathara
- Interactive map of Madathara
- Coordinates: 8.817755°N 77.013259°E
- Country: India
- State: Kerala
- District: Kollam

Government
  - Body: Gram panchayat
- Elevation: 500 m (1,600 ft)

Languages
  - Official: Malayalam, English
- Time zone: UTC+5:30 (IST)
- PIN: 691541

Madathara is a major town junction located in Kollam district in the Indian state of Kerala. Madathara is the town in Thiruvananthapuram-Thenmala -Shenkottai State Highway 2 (Kerala) and SH-64 Varkala -Parippally - Madathara road intersection, Madathara is a junction town. It is nestled in Kulathupuzha hills of Western ghats. The Kallada river originates from Madathara hills.

== Nearby towns ==
Madathara is well connected by major towns in Kerala and Tamil Nadu.

- Thiruvananthapuram city 48 km (30 mi)
- Nedumangad 30 km (19 mi)
- Kollam 53 km (33 mi)
- Palode 13 km (9 mi)
- Kulathupuzha 15 km (10 mi)
- Thenmala 25 km (16 mi)
- Tenkasi 62 km (39 mi)
- Madurai 217 km (136 mi)
- Thoothukudi 177 km (110 mi)
- Kadakkal 13 km (9 mi)
- Punalur 32 km (20 mi)
- Pathanamthitta 82 km (51 mi)

== Educational institutions ==
- Travancore Arts And Science College, Madathara
- Government High School Madatharakkani
- SNHSS Paruthi, Chithara
