= Vazhayila =

- Suburb
- Location in Kerala Vazhayila (India)
- Coordinates: 8°32′49″N 76°58′26″E
- Country: India
- State: Kerala
- District: Thiruvananthapuram

Languages
  - Official: English, Malayalam
- Time zone: UTC+5:30 (IST)
- Postal code: 695005

Vazhayila is a suburb of Thiruvananthapuram near Peroorkada in the Thiruvananthapuram district of Kerala, India. It comes under the Vattiyoorkavu Assembly constituency. The Killi River, a tributary of the Karamana River, passes through Vazhayila.

== Connectivity ==
Vazhayila is connected via State Highway 2 to various places inside and outside the district like Karakulam, Nedumangad, Palode, Thenmala etc.
