= Mannanthala Anandavaleeswaram Temple =

Hindu temple in Thiruvananthapuram district of Kerala

- Anandavaleeswaram Temple, Mannanthala, Thiruvananthapuram, Kerala

Religion
- Affiliation: Hinduism
- District: Thiruvananthapuram
- Deity: Parvati

Location
- Location: Mannanthala
- State: Kerala
- Country: India
- Coordinates: 8°33′23″N 76°56′38″E

Architecture
- Type: Architecture of Kerala
- Completed

Specifications
- Temple: One
- Elevation: 73.72 m (242 ft)

Mannanthala Anandavalleshwaram Devi Temple is a Hindu temple in the Mannanthala suburb of Thiruvananthapuram, India.

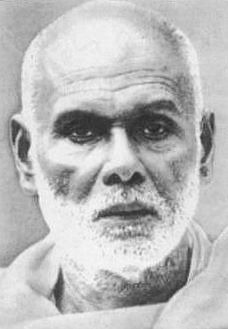
Sri Narayana Guru : Spiritual Guru, One of the greatest Social reformers in India

== Location ==
This temple is located at an altitude of about 73.72 m above the mean sea level. Mannanthala Anandavalleshwaram temple is situated near main road, one bus stop ahead of Mannanthala junction while travelling from Trivandrum to Kottayam via MC road. This temple can easily be identified by its North Indian style architecture and presence of a banyan tree near the temple.

== Origin ==
In earlier days priests worshiped 'Bhadrakali'. They sacrificed animals to please the Devi. At that time this was a common thing. One day Sree Narayana Guru came there. He raised his voice against this brutal and ancient act and stopped the animal sacrifice at the temple. Here Guru made a new Prathista after the famous Aruvippuram Prathista. Later Guru advised the chief priest of the temple to worship Devi as 'Sree Parvathy'. Guru also wrote a poem, which hails the Devi, known as "Mannanthala Devi Stavam". From that day onwards Devi has been worshiped as 'Sree Parvathy'.

== Present state ==
Now main deity is Devi Sree Parvathy. Lord Vinayaka, Lord Subramanya and Nagaraja are sub deities. Temple opens at five o' clock and closes around ten o' clock, in the mornings in normal days. Similarly temple opens at five o' clock and closes around eight o' clock in the evenings. Remember this timing is not valid for festival days. Different types of poojas are available at this temple. Priests are selected from Ezhava Community.

== Administration ==
The administration of this temple is carried out by a selected trust under SNDP Yogam.

== See also ==
- Narayana Guru
- Sree Narayana Dharma Paripalana
- Ezhava
- Aruvippuram
- Sivagiri, Kerala
- Mannanthala
