= Kudappanakunnu Kunnathu Sri Mahadeva Temple =

Hindu temple in India

Kunnathu Sri Mahadeva Temple
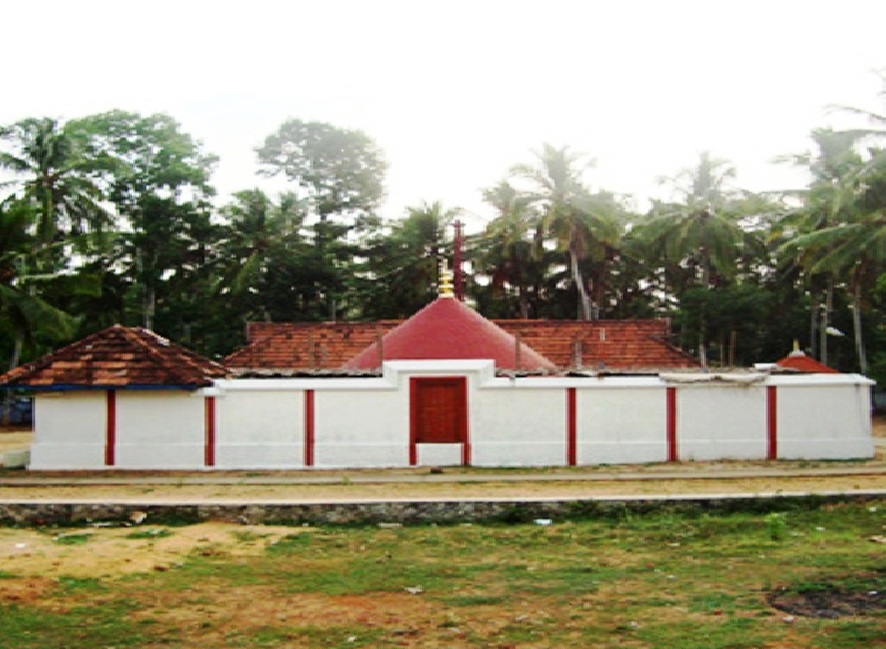
- Nalambalam & Sreekovil

Religion
- Affiliation: Hinduism
- District: Thiruvananthapuram District
- Deity: Shiva
- Festival: Maha Shivaratri

Location
- Location: Kudappanakunnu, Thiruvananthapuram
- State: Kerala
- Country: India
- Interactive map of Kunnathu Sri Mahadeva Temple
- Coordinates: 8.555207°N 76.961195°E

Architecture
- Type: Kerala style
- Completed: Not known
- Monument: 1

Kunnathu Sri Mahadeva Temple (കുന്നപ്പുറം, കുന്നത്ത്കാവ്)is located in the city of Thiruvananthapuram at Kudappanakunnu in Thiruvananthapuram district. The presiding deity of the temple is Lord Shiva, located in separate sanctum sanatoriums, facing east. It is believed that this temple is one of the 108 Shiva temples of Kerala and is installed by sage Parasurama dedicated to Lord Shiva. The temple is located near the Kudappanakkunnu Civil Station on the Peroorkada-Mannanthala road.

The main shrine and its surroundings however has its old charm punctured by crude constructions. Other deities in the Kunnathu temples worshiped are Ganapathy and Vasuki (snake). Annual festival of the temple celebrates in the Malayalam month of Dhanu (month) (December–January).

== See also ==
- 108 Shiva Temples
- Temples of Kerala
