= State Highway 2 (Kerala) =

State highway in Kerala, India

State Highway 2
- Thiruvananthapuram - Thenmala road
- SH 2 highlighted in red

Route information
- Maintained by Kerala Public Works Department
- Length: 73.2 km (45.5 mi)
- Component highways: SH 45 from Thiruvananthapuram to Ponmudi

Major junctions
- South end: Peroorkada, Thiruvananthapuram
- SH 3 / SH 47 in Nedumangad; SH 45 in Chullimanoor; SH 59 in Palode; SH 64, Madathara; SH 59, Kulathupuzha
- North end: NH 744 in Thenmala

Location
- Country: India
- State: Kerala
- Districts: Thiruvananthapuram, Kollam

Highway system
- Roads in India; Expressways; National; State; Asian; State Highways in Kerala
← SH 1	→ SH 3

State Highway 2 (SH 2) is a State Highway in Kerala, India that starts from Thiruvananthapuram Peroorkada and ends near Thenmala Kollam by joining with Kollam-Tirumangalam NH-744. The highway is 73.2 km long. The major towns in this highway are Nedumangad, Palode, Madathara and Kulathupuzha.

This road also known as Trivandrum Sengottai road was a historic route that connected Travancore capital with the exclave of Sengottai and Courtallam. In 1900 November Lord Curzon used this route to travel from Travancore to Tirunelveli.

== Route description ==
Trivandrum > Peroorkada > Vazhayila > Karakulam > Pazhakutty > Anad > Nanniyode > Palode > Madathara > Kulathupuzha > Thenmala junction - joins with Kollam-Tirumangalam NH-744. This highway starts from Thiruvananthapuram corporation limits and ends at Thenmala junction kollam District. From Vellayambalam to vazhayila near Peroorkada in City limits, the highway is upgraded into a four-lane road with the part of Thiruvananthapuram City Road Improvement Project (TCRIP) Under Kerala Road Fund board. This stretch is one of the busiest roads in Trivandrum.

== Development ==
In 2016 the state government announced the upgrading of Vazhayila to Nedumangad 12 km stretch into 21m four lane road. Government approved the project and land acquisition is going on. The remaining Nedumangad to Thenmala stretch is developing into standard two lane highway by PWD.

In 2017 the central government announced that the highway is approved in principle as a National Highway as part of developing the road under Bharatmala scheme and is preparing a Detailed Project Report through NHAI.

The Trivandrum Outer Ring Road Project and Hill Highway intersects and overlaps ith certain reaches of this highway.

== Main intersections ==
- Peroorkada (Thiruvananthapuram)
- Nedumangad (11nth Stone Junction) (SH 3)

Connecting Nedumangad - Aruvaimozhi (Tamilnadu)

- Nedumangad (Pazhakutty junction) (SH 47)

Connecting Nedumangad - Vembayam (MC Road)

- Nedumangad (Chullimanoor junction) (SH 45)

Connecting Nedumangad - Vithura - Ponmudi highway

- Palode (SH 59 Hill Highway)

Palode - Peringammala- Vithura road & Palode - Braemore road

- Madathara (SH 64)

connecting Madathara- Paripally (NH 66)

- Kulathupuzha (SH 59 Hill Highway)

Connecting Kulathupuzha - Anchal road

== See also ==
- Roads in Kerala
- List of state highways in Kerala
