= Sarvodaya Vidyalaya, Trivandrum =

Sarvodaya Vidyalaya Trivandrum

Location
- Mar Ivanios Vidya Nagar; Nalanchira; Thiruvananthapuram, Kerala, 695015; India; 8.5463°N 76.9393°E

Information
- Type: Private
- Motto: Let there be light
- Established: 3 January 1973
- Founder: Archbishop Benedict Mar Gregorios
- Sister school: Sarvodaya Central Vidyalaya (CBSE)
- School board: CISCE, ISC, SCERT
- School district: Thiruvananthapuram
- Category: Co - Educational Institution
- School code: KE 033
- Principal: Mr. John Kurian
- Bursar(Local Manager): Rev. Fr. Abraham Uzhathil
- Head teacher: Mrs. Terine Joseph
- Teaching staff: 160+
- Years offered: LKG - 12
- Age: 3½+
- Enrollment: 4500+
- Language: English
- Hours in school day: 7
- Campus: Mar Ivanios Vidya Nagar
- Houses: Brainy Badgers; Patriotic Panthers; Glorius Grizzlers; Euphoric Eagles
- Colours: Red; Blue; Green; Yellow
- Sports: Cricket; Football; Basketball; Badminton; Chess; Karatte; Kalari; Yoga; Skating; Music; Dance
- Accreditation: ISO 9001:2015
- Website: sarvodayavidyalaya.edu.in
- Last updated: 21/06/2024

Sarvodaya Vidyalaya is a school of the Major Archiepiscopal Eparchy of the Syro-Malankara Catholic Church. Situated on the Bethany Hills at Nalanchira, Sarvodaya was founded on 3 January 1973 by Benedict Mar Gregorios, the Metropolitan Archbishop of Trivandrum.

The school is one of the few schools in the district which provides ISC and ICSE syllabi, one of the advanced course in the country. The school has a population of 4,500 students and over 160 teachers.

The motto of the school is "Let there be light".

== Management ==
The school is owned and managed by the Major Archdiocese of Trivandrum. One of the primary apostolates of the archdiocese concerns its service in the field of education. For the last 75 years, it has been providing education to thousands of students across the nation.

Patron Manager: Baselios Cardinal Cleemis, Major Archbishop of Trivandrum is the patron of the School.

=== Former local managers ===
1. Late Rev. Fr. George Mootheril (1973-1995)
2. Msgr. Varkey Attupurathu (1995-2007)
3. Rt Rev. Dr. Thomas Mar Eusebious (2007-2010)
4. Fr. Jacob Kalianthanath (2010-2012)
5. Fr. Thomas Koipurath (2010-2012)
6. Fr. Sheen Palakuzhi (2012-2014)
7. Fr. Koshy Chirakkarottu (2014-2016)
8. Fr. Antony Raj (2016-2018)
9. Fr. Koshy Chirakkarottu (2018- )

=== Former principals ===
1. Paul Varghese (1973-1978)
2. Fr. Philip C. Pantholil (1979-1980)
3. Jacob Cherian (1980-1982)
4. T. M. George (1982-1990)
5. A.C. Philip (1990-1994)
6. Dr. George Francis Parappally (1994-1996)
7. Prof. James Stewart (1996-2001)
8. Dr. Antony Eapen (2001-2011)
9. Fr. George Mathew Karoor (2011-2020)
10. Dr. James T. Joseph (2020-2023)

Prof.Dr. Shirley Stewart was appointed as the new Principal of the school in June 2023 and Fr. Koshy Chirakkarottu is the Bursar (Cum Local Manager) of Sarvodaya Vidyalaya and Sarvodaya Central Vidyalaya Schools at Mar Ivanios Vidya Nagar, Nalanchira, Trivandrum.

== Courses ==
=== ICSE/ISC course ===
The ICSE course, the most advanced one now available in India, is modelled and organised on the lines of the Senior Cambridge Course of England. The syllabi are prepared, books prescribed and examinations conducted accordingly to achieve academic excellence. There are about 100 recognised ICSE/ISC schools in the whole country.

1. Formal education is imparted to students from standard I to X in accordance with the guidelines prescribed by CISCE (Council for the Indian School Certificate Examinations). Examinations are conducted accordingly which is the criteria for admission to the Plus two course.
2. The school also offers Plus Two (ISC-Indian School Certificate) course which is equivalent to the Higher Secondary Course giving eligibility for admission to Professional Courses. English, Mathematics, Physics, Chemistry and Biology / Computer Science are the subjects offered by this school. The ISC course is the only course in India to receive accreditation in foreign countries.
3. The medium of instruction is English. English, Malayalam and Hindi are compulsory languages for standard I to VIII. Students of standard IX and X can opt either Malayalam or Hindi as their second language along with English as their first language

=== SSLC course ===
The school offers SSLC Course with Kerala State syllabus in English medium from standard VIII. Students joining SSLC course from any other course can choose Special English instead of Malayalam. The school also offers Higher Secondary Course (Plus two course) in the Bio-maths stream.

== Admission ==
1. Admission to LKG class of the succeeding Academic year is given in October of the previous year.
2. The minimum age for admission to LKG class is 3½ years and to standard I is 5½ years on the first of June of the year of study.

== Facilities ==
=== Library ===
The school has a library with more than 20,000 books and more than 15 standard periodicals, and a reference section. Members of staff and students are expected to use the school library regularly. Internet, FAX and photocopying facilities are provided in the library. The library consists of multiple language books like Malayalam, English etc.

=== Laboratory ===
There are five laboratories in the school for Physics, Chemistry, Biology, Computer and Mathematics.

=== Transportation ===
Twenty three School buses run to different parts of the city.

== Accreditation ==
Sarvodaya Vidyalaya has been accredited with ISO 9001:2015. The school has been assessed and found to be in accordance with the requirements of standard given below ("Providing Academic Education from Nursery to XII Standard as per ICSE and Kerala State Board")

== Notable alumni ==
- Sajan Skaria - Character Supervisor at Pixar Animation Studios and part of the team that won the academy award for the animated movie Inside Out
- Sakhi Elsa - Kerala State Award winner for Best Costume Designing.
- Arthana Binu - Actress in Malayalam and Tamil Film Industry
- Nazriya Nazim - Actress
