= Keraladithyapuram =

- Residential Area
- Location in Kerala, India
- Coordinates: 8°33′47″N 76°56′0″E
- Country: India
- State: Kerala
- District: Thiruvananthapuram

Languages
  - Official: Malayalam, English
- Time zone: UTC+5:30 (IST)
- PIN: 695588
- Telephone code: 0471
- Vehicle registration: KL-01 & KL-22
- Nearest city: Thiruvananthapuram

Keraladithyapuram is a semi urban business area situated in the suburbs of Thiruvananthapuram.It is 1 km away from Mannathala and situated on Mannanthala-Powdikonam-Sreekariyam route.It is under the jurisdiction of the Thiruvananthapuram Municipal Corporation. It is located at.

== Location ==
Keraladithyapuram is located at. It is 1 km away from Main Central Road and 11 km away from the city East Fort.The nearest airport is Thiruvananthapuram International Airport which is 13 km away and the nearest railway station Thiruvananthapuram Central is 10 km away. Regular bus service is provided by Kerala State Road Transport Corporation.

== Culture ==
Hindus constitute a majority of the population. Hindu, Muslim, and Christian communities are present in the village. The area contains several Hindu temples and other religious institutions. Kelamangalam Sree Mahavishnu Temple is a Hindu temple dedicated to Mahavishnu. The temple was renovated during the reign of Sree Chithira Thirunal Balarama Varma, the Maharaja of Travancore. The main idol faces west. Mailappally Devi Temple is another Hindu temple in the area. Christian institutions in the area include the Mar Thoma Bishop's House and Trivandrum Bible College.

== Places of interest ==
- Kelamangalam Sree Mahavishnu Temple
- Sree Mailappally Devi Temple
- Mar Thoma Bishop's House
