= Nalanchira =

- town
- Location in Kerala, India
- Coordinates: 8.5533200°N 76.9367300°E
- Country: India
- State: Kerala
- District: Thiruvananthapuram

Languages
  - Official: Malayalam, English
- Time zone: UTC+5:30 (IST)
- Postal code: 695015
- Telephone code: 0471
- Vehicle registration: KL-01, KL-22

Nalanchira is a suburb of Thiruvananthapuram the capital of Kerala state in India. It is an educational hub of Kerala, situated between Mannanthala and Pananvila. Nalanchira is approximately 8 km from the Thiruvananthapuram railway station and 11 km away from Thiruvananthapuram International Airport. The Main Central Road (MC Road) runs through this place. This middle-class residential locality is famous for its educational and social service institutions. The Nalanchira Bethany Hills were originally owned by a chettiar and was given to Mar Ivanios the founder of Syro-Malankara Catholic (MSC) Church to start an educational institution. The main residential areas are Benedict Nagar, Christian medical centre (CMC) lane, Parakodu lane, Mangalathu Lane, Convent Lane, Rajeev Gandhi Nagar, Puliyoor Gardens, Rose Nagar, Akshaya Gardens, Shawallace Lane, Thattinakam Souhrda Residents Association, Parkanthara Lane, Post Office Lane, Chathiode Lane, Udayannoor Lane, Kurishadi Jn., Anupama Nagar, Kushavarkal Road, Bethany Nagar Lane and Jayamatha Lane.

Christians, Hindus and Muslims live in harmony in Nalanchira.

The major churches are St. Thomas Syro-Malankara Catholic Church, St.Mary's Malankara Orthodox Church and St. Peter CSI Church Nalanchira.

Bethany Ashram, the first religious congregation in the Syro Malankara Catholic Church, has a house that was established in 1933 by Servant of God Arch Bishop Mar Ivanios OIC. This house is the mother house of the congregation and the Ashram Chapel is considered as the first church in Trivandrum by the Syrian Christian community. Near to Bethany Ashram, there situates the Provincial House of Bethany Navajeevan Province. At Bethany Nagar Lane there is one of the 'Dayaras' of Bethany Ashram which is also the Minor Seminary of the Congregation. Ashram runs the institutions such as Navajeevan Bethany Vidyalaya (School), Bethany Nature Cure Centre, Bethany College of Physiotherapy and Bethany Students Centre (Hostel for boys).

Udiyannur Shiva Temple is one of the main temples, another major temple is the Eravipuram Sri Krishna Swami Temple.T he Uriyadi festival at this temple on the occasion of Janmashtami attracts devotees from all over the country. Udayannur Shiva Temple is unique among the Siva temples by having two Siva temples in the same temple campus. It is one of the oldest Siva temples in the city. Another famous temple is Ezhukanyavoor Devi.

Shri VK Prasanth of Left Democratic Front (LDF) represents Nalanchira in the state legislative assembly which is a part of the Vattiyoorkavu constituency, while Shri Sashi Tharoor represents the area in the Lok Sabha.

Bethany Nature Cure, an ayurvedic treatment and yoga centre, is located here. The Synaxis of the Bethany Ashramam held in the year 1998 decided to divide the congregation into two provinces, namely Bethany Navajeevan Province and Bethany Navajyothi Province (the headquarters) is situated at Bethany Hill, Nalanchira, Trivandrum. The Jayamatha Orphanage, run by Franciscans Christian Missionaries, is also located in Nalanchira.

This suburb is home to several educational institutions such as Mar Ivanios College, Mar Baselios College of Engineering and Technology, Mar Gregorios College of Law, Sarvodaya Vidyalaya, Mar Theophilus teacher training college, Bethany College, St. John's School, St. Goretti’s School, Jaimatha Institutions, Navajeevan School, Hotel Management College and the Institution for Fire and Safety Engineering. Hospitals include KJK Hospital at Shawallace Lane which specialised in infertility treatment.
