= Mannanthala =

- town
- Location in Kerala, India
- Coordinates: 8°33′53″N 76°56′37″E
- Country: India
- State: Kerala
- District: Thiruvananthapuram

Languages
  - Official: Malayalam, English
- Time zone: UTC+5:30 (IST)
- PIN: 695015
- Telephone code: 0471
- Vehicle registration: KL 22(Ulloor Zone), KL 01 (kudappanakkunnu Zone)
- Nearest city: Thiruvananthapuram
- Website: www

Mannanthala is a suburb of Thiruvananthapuram, the capital of Kerala, India.

It is located on the Main Central Road, after Nalanchira, in the direction of Kottayam. Keraladithyapuram is about 1 kilometre (0.62 mi) away from Mannanthala. It is connected to the city by buses run by Kerala State Road Transport Corporation from the Thampanoor and East Fort bus depots. The nearest airport is Thiruvananthapuram International Airport.

Prominent institutions and places of interest include:

- Mannanthala Anandavaleeswaram Temple
- St Thomas School, Mukkolakkal
- Government Press Mannanthala
- Vayambachira Pond
- Government High School
- Mannanthala Mukkolakkal Mahaganapathy Temple
- St.Rita's Malankara Catholic Church, Aruviyode
- Melamcodu Devi Temple

The MLA of Mannanthala is from the Vattiyoorkavu Assembly constituency of the Kerala Legislative Assembly. The elected Member of Legislative Assembly (MLA) for this region is K. Muraleedharan of the Indian National Congress (INC).
