= Palode =

- Town
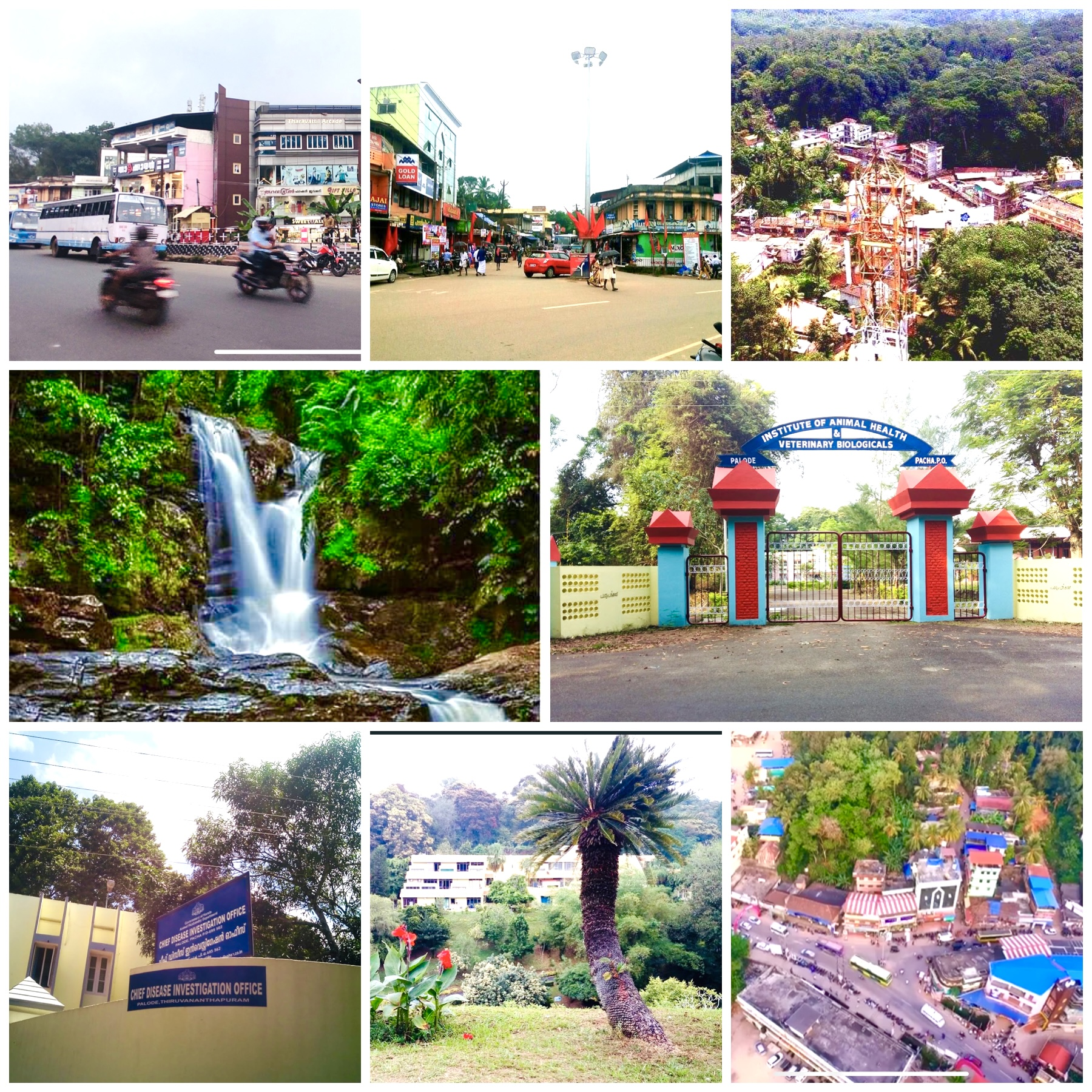
- Clockwise from Top; Kusavoor jn, Palode Town, Veterinary Biologicals Institute, Tropical Botanical Garden, Chief Disease Investigation Office, Mankayan Eco-Tourism
- Nickname: Pacha Palode
- Location in Kerala, India Palode (India)
- Coordinates: 8.7033°N 77.0264°E
- Country: India
- State: Kerala
- District: Thiruvananthapuram
- Taluks: Nedumangad

Government
  - Type: Serpanch
  - Body: Gram panchayat

Population (2001)
  - Total: 14,795

Languages
  - Official: Malayalam, English
- Time zone: UTC+5:30 (IST)
- PIN: 695562
- Area code: +91472
- Vehicle registration: KL-21 & KL-16

Palode is a town in Thiruvananthapuram district in the Indian state of Kerala. Palode town is 35 km (22 mi) from Thiruvananthapuram city and 17 km (11 mi) from Nedumangad municipality. Thenmala Dam is 38 km (24 mi) from Palode, and the Ponmudi hills are 35 km. Palode is on the Thiruvananthapuram-Thenmala-Shenkottai State Highway 2 (Kerala). Tenkasi is 75 km (47 mi) from Palode.

Palode is surrounded by the Western Ghats and is a gateway for tourism destinations. Places of interest and tourism near Palode include Jawaharlal Nehru Tropical Botanic Garden and Research Institute, Mankayam Ecotourism, Brimore Tourism, and Lower Meenmutty Hydel Tourism Centre Nanniyode. Brimore is 11 km (6.8 mi) away and has a tea estate and plantations.

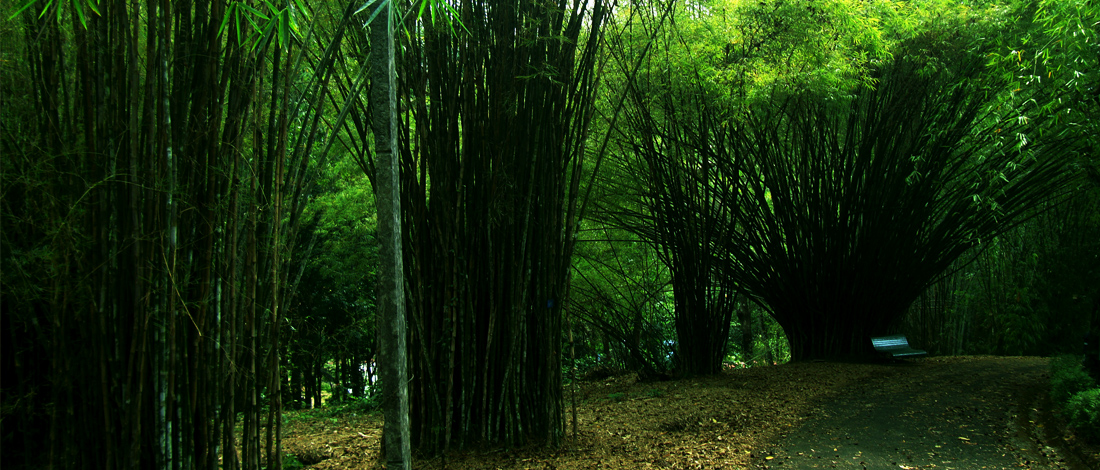
Tropical Botanical Garden

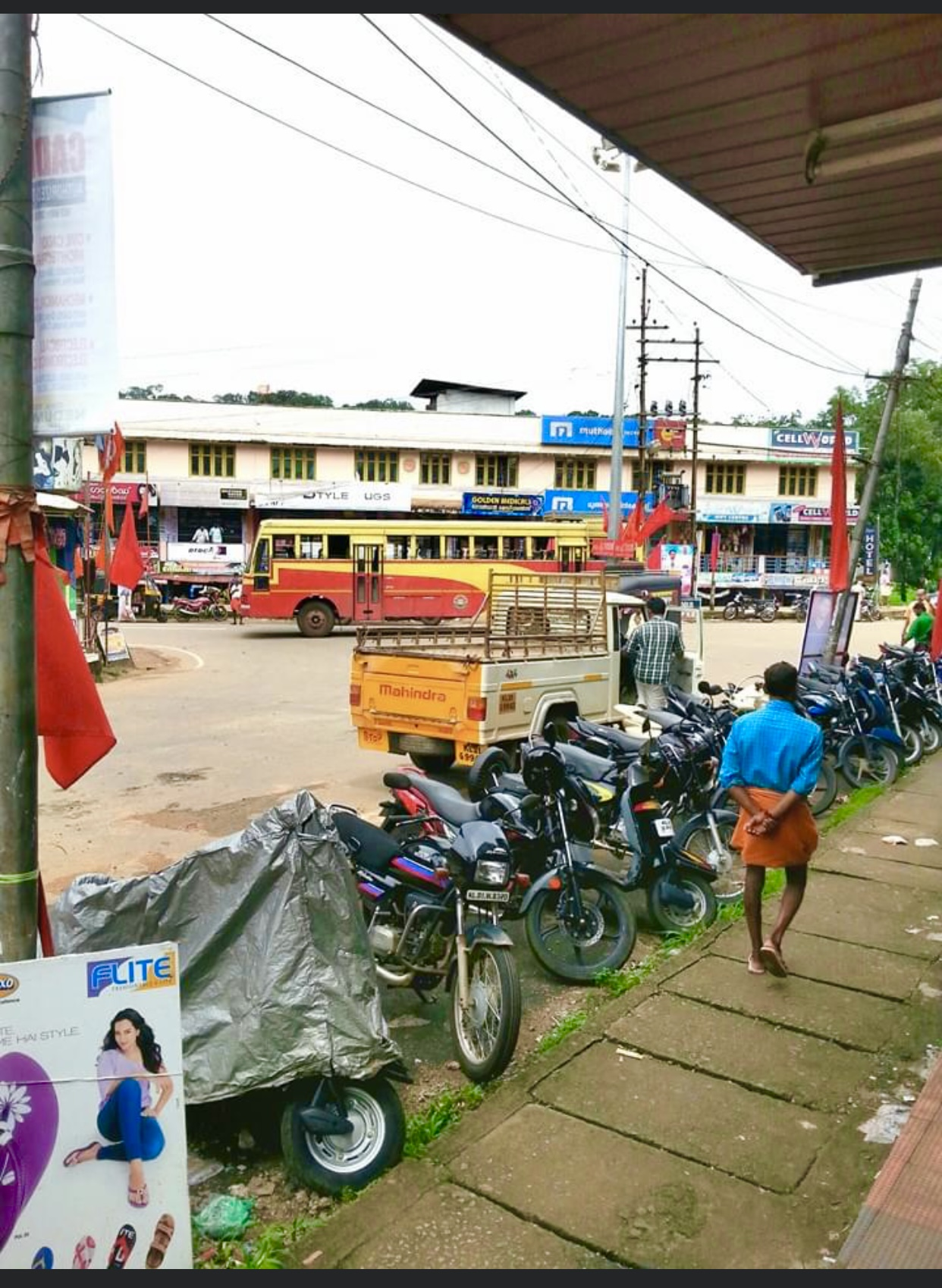
Kusavoor Jn in Palode

== Demographics ==
Palode's population in 2023 was estimated to be 18,205. It had a population of 14,922 in 2011, with 7,005 males and 7,917 females. The total female population was 53.1%. Scheduled Tribe population was 4.2%. Scheduled caste population was 10.1%. The total literacy rate was 84.3% (2011). The working population of Palode was 38.8%.

== History ==
Palode was once a stronghold of the Venad empire, a medieval kingdom that exerted much dominance in the region. However, the onset of the colonial era saw the once-mighty empire splinter into four provinces, namely Chirava, Tripappor, Ilayidam (Kottarakara), and Perakam (also called Nedumangad).

== Geography ==
Palode is located at 8.7033N 77.0264E. It is 35 km (22 mi) northeast from Thiruvananthapuram city. It is a small hamlet on the foothills of the Western Ghats covered by rubber plantations and forest. Vamanapuram river passes through Palode. The town is surrounded by Peringammala, Nanniyode and Pangode Panchayath.

== Transport ==
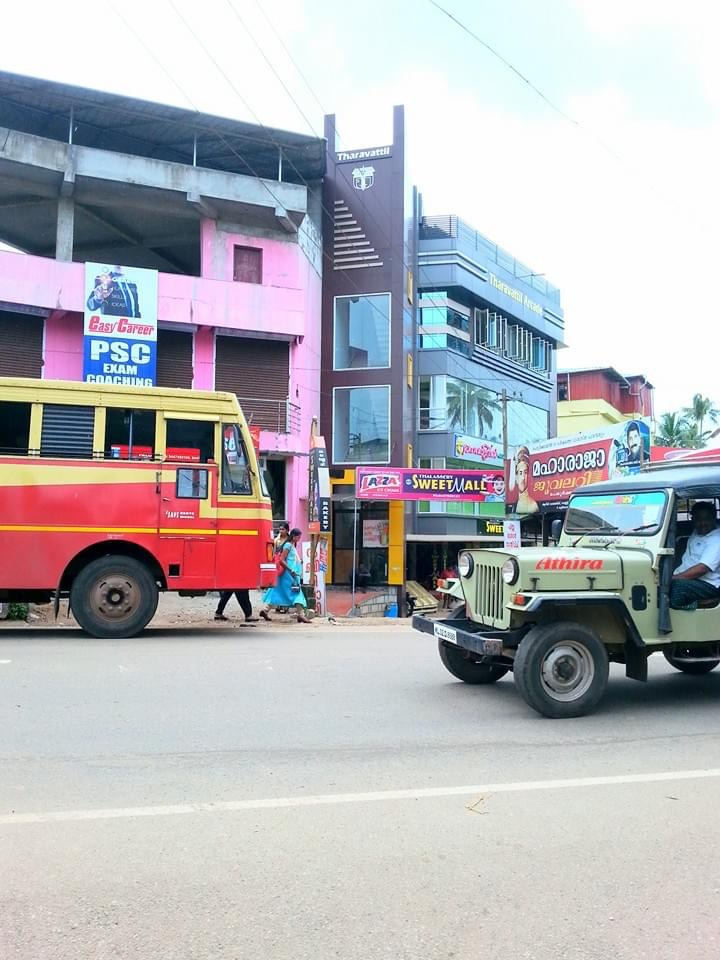
Palode

=== Road transport ===
Palode is well connected to major cities in Kerala and Tamil Nadu. Thiruvananthapuram-Thenmala SH-2 passes through Palode. Kerala state road transport corporation has a bus depot in Palode connecting major towns and villages in Thiruvananthapuram and Kollam District. Thiruvananthapuram is 35 km (22 mi), Kollam is 66 km (41 mi) and Tenkasi is 75 km (47 mi) away. The main places near Palode are Madathara (13 km (8.1 mi)), Kallara (17 km (11 mi)), Vithura (14 km (8.7 mi)) and Kulathupuzha (28 km (17 mi)). Palode can be reached by roads from most parts of Kerala. MC Road (State Highway 1) is connected by Karette-Kallara-Palode bus route.

- Thiruvananthapuram city 35 km (22 mi)
- Nedumangad 17 km (11 mi)
- Kollam 66 km (41 mi)
- Thenmala 38 km (24 mi)
- Tenkasi 75 km (47 mi)
- Madurai 230 km (140 mi)
- Thoothukudi 190 km (120 mi)
- Attingal 37 km (23 mi)
- Punalur 45 km (28 mi)
- Pathanamthitta 95 km (59 mi)

=== Air transport ===
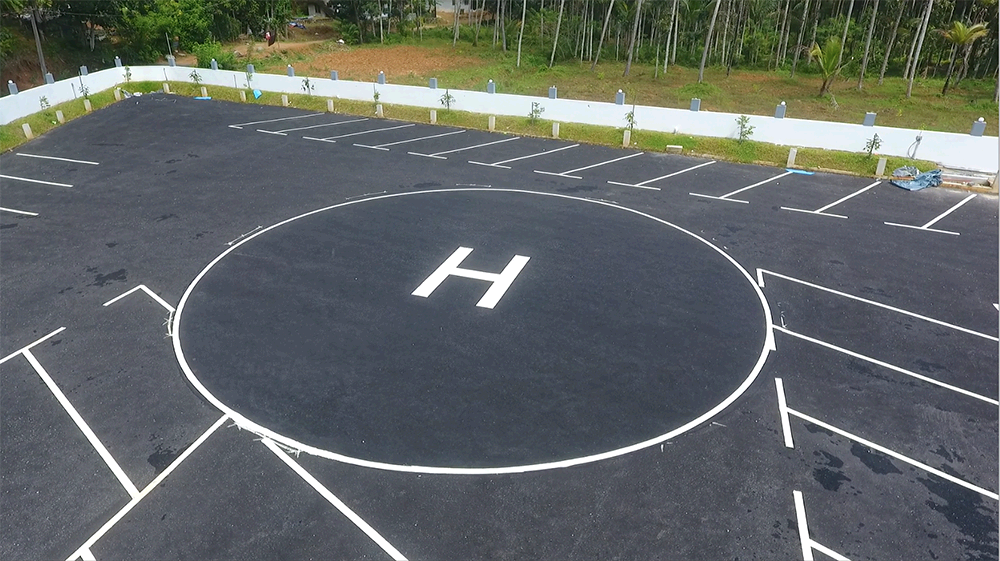
Palode helipad

The nearest airport is Thiruvananthapuram International Airport (TRV), 35 km (22 mi)away. Cochin International Airport is 225 km (140 mi)away.

There is a helipad in Palode.

=== Rail transport ===
No railway lines pass through Palode. In phase 3 of the proposed Sabari railway line, there will be a station in Palode. Nearest railway stations near Palode are:

- Thiruvananthapuram Central Railway Station 35 km (22 mi)
- Thenmala railway station 38 km (24 mi)
- Punalur Railway station 45 km (28 mi)
- Chirayinkil Railway Station 43 km (27 mi)
- Varkala Railway Station 47 km (29 mi)
- Kollam railway Station 63 km (39 mi)

== Place of worship ==
- St George Roman Catholic Latin church
- Assemblies of God Church
- Palode Juma Masjid
- Uma Maheswara Temple Palode
- Sree Dharma Sastha Temple, Pacha
- Madan Thampuran Temple
- CSI Palode Church
- Seventh-day Adventist Church Palode
- Pappanamcode Juma Masjid
- St. Joseph Malankara Catholic Church Palode

== Places of interest and tourism ==
=== Mankayam ecotourism ===
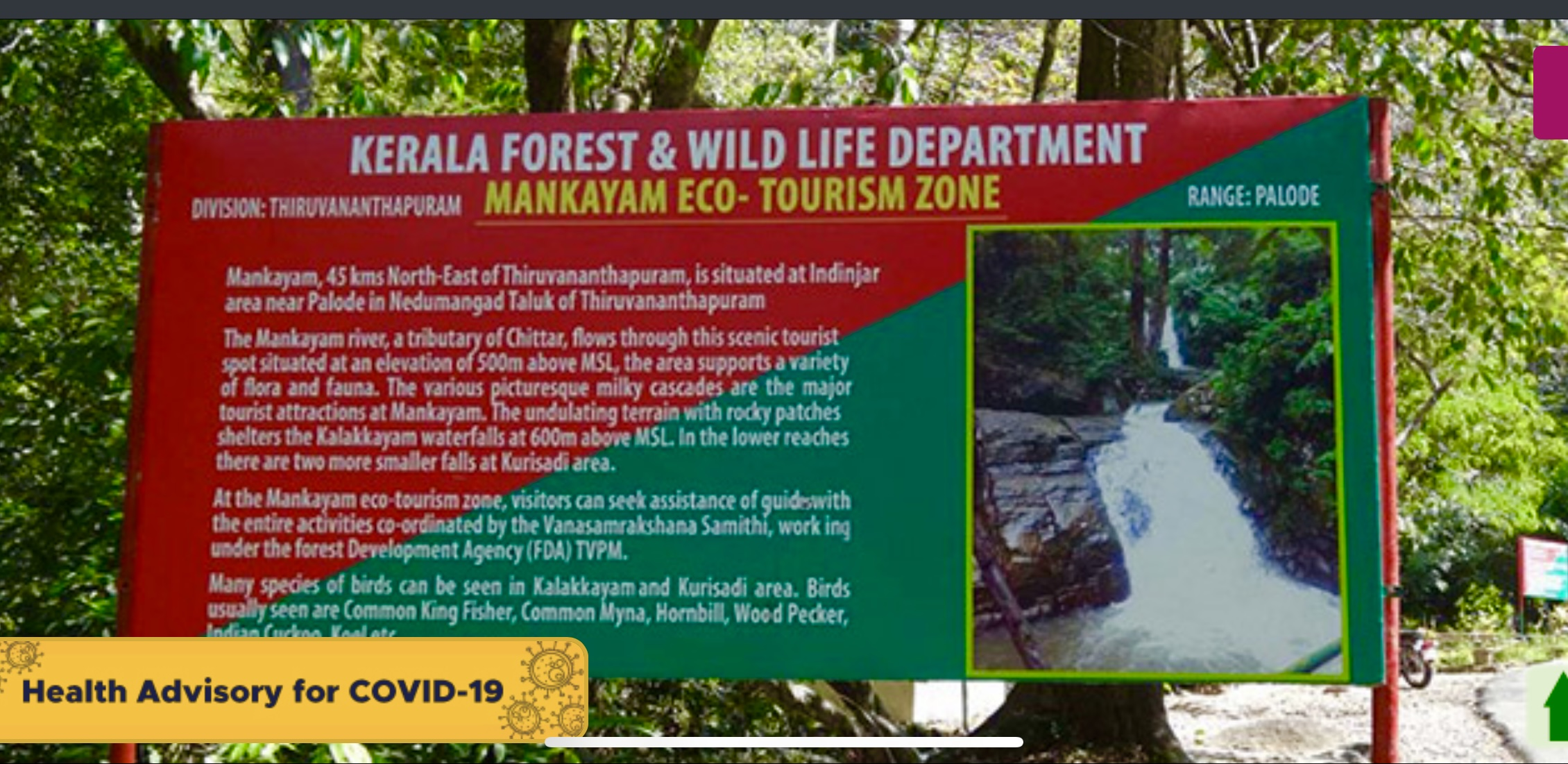
Mankayam Ecotourism main entry

Mankayam is about 45 km (28 mi) northeast of Thiruvananthapuram City, 11 km (6.8 mi) from Palode on the way to Brimore. Mankayam is a popular eco-tourism spot in Kerala. From the hill ranges of Chemunchi the Chittar River flows down through the forest, creating a tributary in the form of the Mankayam River. The picturesque milky cascades are the major tourist attractions at Mankayam. Among the two waterfalls are the Kalakayam and Kurissadi which are among the biggest waterfalls in southern Kerala. The state forest department offers exclusive trekking options.

=== Brimore tourism ===
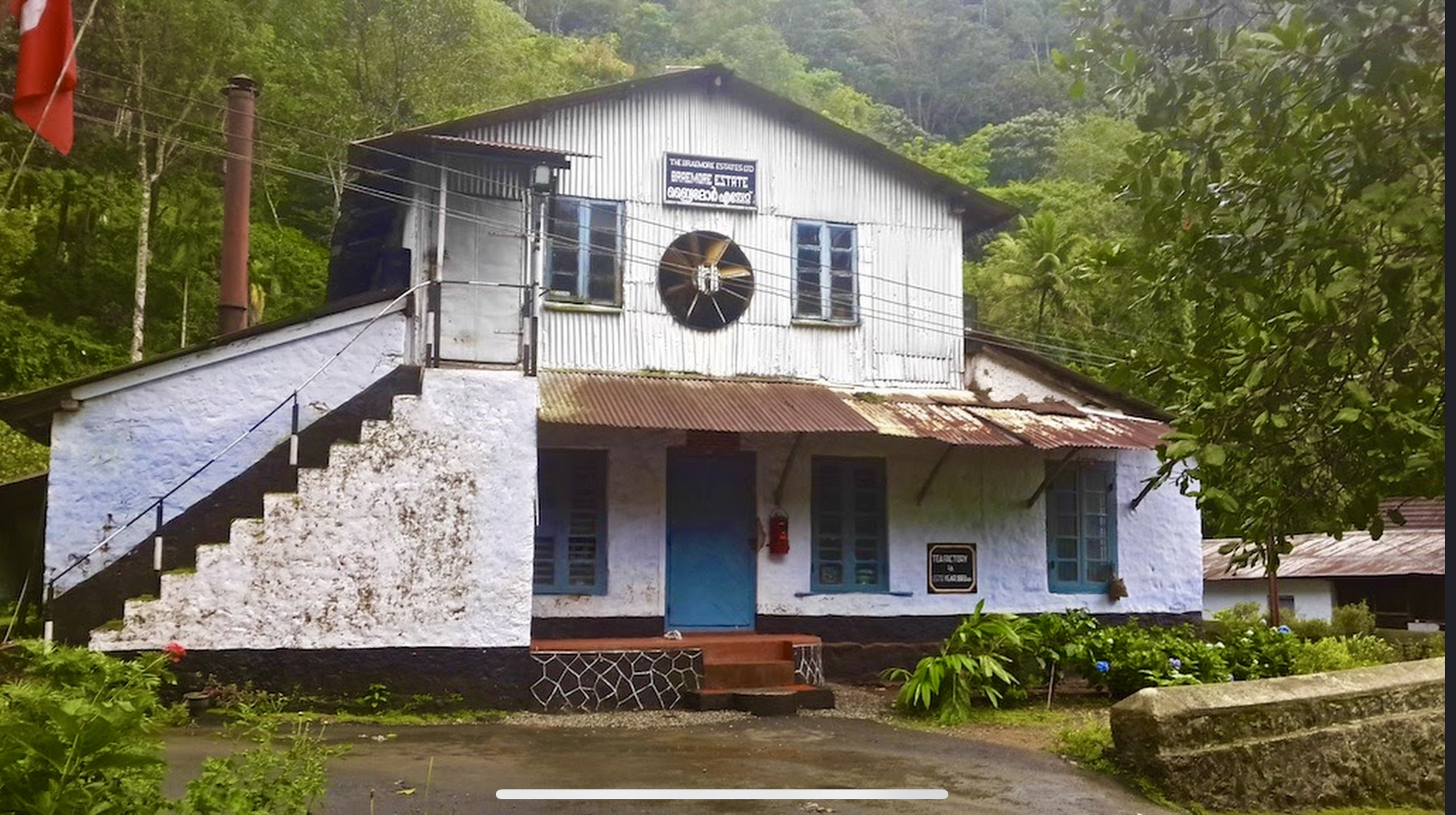
Braemore Estate

Brimore Marigold Estate is a 900-acre tea, rubber and coffee estate 13 km (8.1 mi) from Palode established by the British in 1880.

Brimore is one of the best trekking spots in Kerala and lies at a height of 300 metres (980 ft) above sea level. The forest checkpost at Mankayam waterfalls requires a payment of Rs 25 per vehicle. Attractions near Brimore include:

- Ayyappa temple - An old termite mound converted into a granite temple
- Brimore Tea Factory - One of the oldest tea factories in Kerala
- Madame Falls - 2 km (1.2 mi) inside the Brimore estate
- Ramayana Cave - A stream originates from the cave.
- Seetha waterfalls - Safe for bathing a natural bathtub
- Braemore Estate Bungalow
- Braemore Palace
- Braemore Hills

=== Lower Meenmutty Hydel Tourism Centre, Nanniyode ===
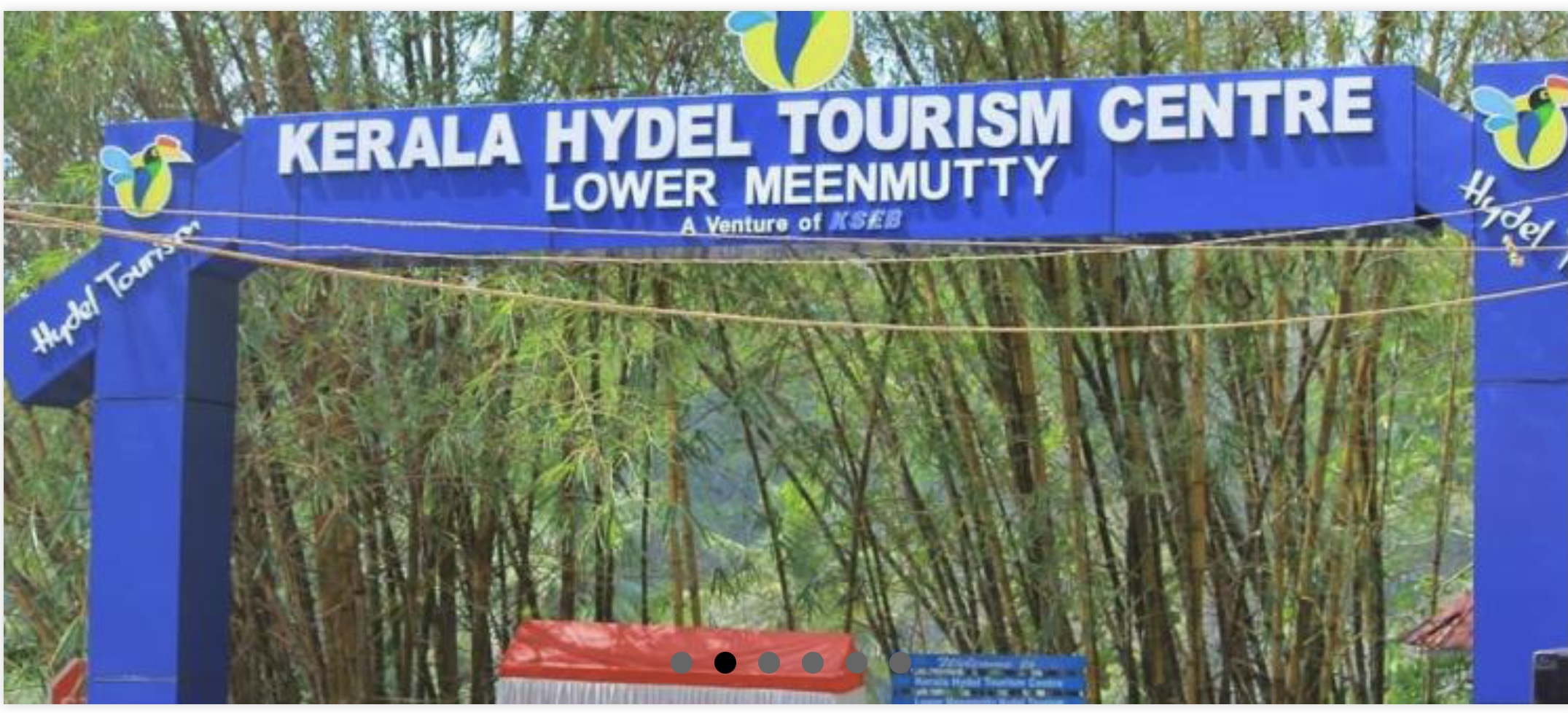
Kerala Hydel Tourism Centre, Lower Meenmutty

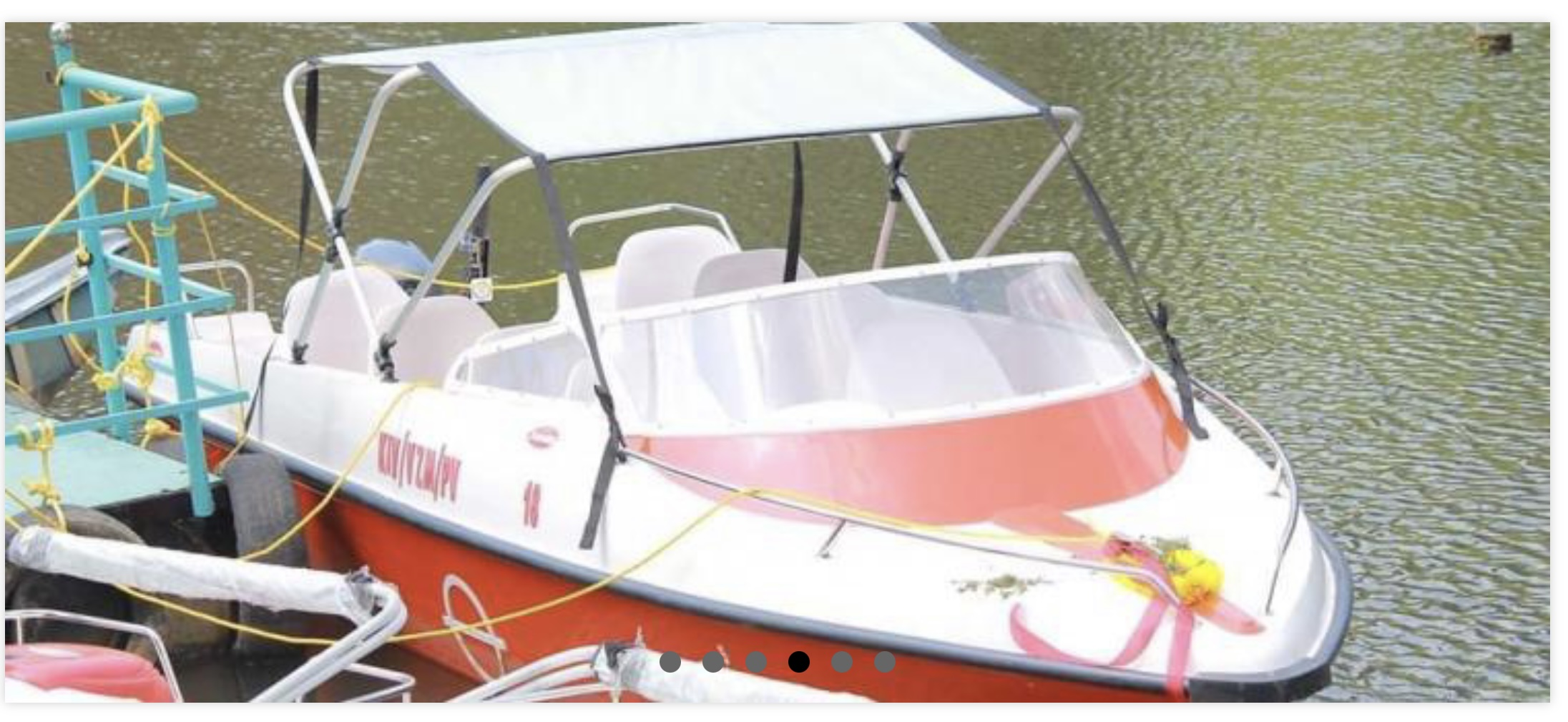
Boat in lower Meenmutty Hydel

The lower Meenmutty Hydel Tourism centre is 4 km (2.5 mi) from Palode in Meenmutty and is related to Lower Meenmutty dam. The lower Meenmutty Hydel Tourism project is the only project working under KSEB in southern Kerala.

The center is surrounded by forest, on the shores of the Vamanapuram river. Boating is a common activity here. Another attraction is the garden. Lower Meenmutty Hydel tourism centre has an amusement zone for children, pedal boats and slow boats. There is a small dam in lower Meenmutty Hydel.

== Climate ==
Palode has a climate that lies on the border between a tropical savanna climate (Köppen Aw) and a tropical monsoon climate (Am). As a result, its only distinct seasons relate to rainfall rather than temperature. The mean maximum temperature is 34 °C (93 °F) and the mean minimum temperature is 21 °C (70 °F). The humidity is high and rises to about 75% during the monsoon season. Palode has south-west monsoons and gets its first showers in early June. The city receives heavy rainfall of around 1,827 mm (71.9 in) per year. Palode gets rain from the receding north-east monsoons which hit the October. The dry season sets in by December. The lowest temperature recorded in the city core was 17.8 °C (64.0 °F) on 6 January 1974 and the highest temperature was 38.0 °C (100.4 °F) on 4 April 2007.

Climate data, Palode (1981–2010, extremes 1901–2012)
Month	Jan	Feb	Mar	Apr	May	Jun	Jul	Aug	Sep	Oct	Nov	Dec	Year
Record high °C (°F)	35.8 (96.4)	36.3 (97.3)	37.7 (99.9)	38.0 (100.4)	35.8 (96.4)	35.8 (96.4)	33.7 (92.7)	34.0 (93.2)	35.4 (95.7)	35.2 (95.4)	34.3 (93.7)	35.5 (95.9)	38.0 (100.4)
Mean maximum °C (°F)	34.4 (93.9)	34.8 (94.6)	35.4 (95.7)	35.1 (95.2)	34.6 (94.3)	32.8 (91.0)	32.1 (89.8)	32.3 (90.1)	33.0 (91.4)	32.8 (91.0)	33.1 (91.6)	34.1 (93.4)	35.9 (96.6)
Average high °C (°F)	32.4 (90.3)	32.8 (91.0)	33.5 (92.3)	33.3 (91.9)	32.6 (90.7)	30.4 (86.7)	30.1 (86.2)	30.3 (86.5)	30.9 (87.6)	30.9 (87.6)	31.0 (87.8)	32.0 (89.6)	31.7 (89.1)
Daily mean °C (°F)	27.4 (81.3)	27.8 (82.0)	28.9 (84.0)	29.2 (84.6)	28.9 (84.0)	27.1 (80.8)	26.7 (80.1)	26.9 (80.4)	27.2 (81.0)	27.2 (81.0)	27.1 (80.8)	27.3 (81.1)	27.6 (81.7)
Average low °C (°F)	22.3 (72.1)	22.9 (73.2)	24.3 (75.7)	25.1 (77.2)	25.1 (77.2)	23.8 (74.8)	23.3 (73.9)	23.4 (74.1)	23.5 (74.3)	23.5 (74.3)	23.2 (73.8)	22.6 (72.7)	23.6 (74.5)
Mean minimum °C (°F)	20.2 (68.4)	20.9 (69.6)	22.1 (71.8)	23.0 (73.4)	22.6 (72.7)	22.0 (71.6)	21.7 (71.1)	21.8 (71.2)	22.1 (71.8)	22.1 (71.8)	21.6 (70.9)	20.3 (68.5)	19.7 (67.5)
Record low °C (°F)	17.8 (64.0)	18.1 (64.6)	20.2 (68.4)	20.3 (68.5)	20.1 (68.2)	20.0 (68.0)	20.2 (68.4)	18.2 (64.8)	20.8 (69.4)	20.1 (68.2)	18.9 (66.0)	18.2 (64.8)	17.8 (64.0)
Average rainfall mm (inches)	19.9 (0.78)	23.7 (0.93)	32.8 (1.29)	123.0 (4.84)	191.6 (7.54)	305.7 (12.04)	189.4 (7.46)	135.7 (5.34)	182.9 (7.20)	281.2 (11.07)	216.3 (8.52)	58.8 (2.31)	1,761.1 (69.33)
Average rainy days	0.9	1.6	2.5	6.9	8.6	16.3	13.6	9.7	9.2	12.0	10.0	3.3	94.7
Average relative humidity (%) (at 17:30 IST)	64	63	66	73	75	80	79	77	77	80	78	69	73
Mean monthly sunshine hours	260.4	248.6	254.2	201.0	192.2	129.0	136.4	164.3	180.0	173.6	165.0	217.0	2,321.7
Mean daily sunshine hours	8.4	8.8	8.2	6.7	6.2	4.3	4.4	5.3	6.0	5.6	5.5	7.0	6.4
Source 1: India Meteorological Department (sun 1971–2000)
Source 2: Tokyo Climate

== Educational institutions ==
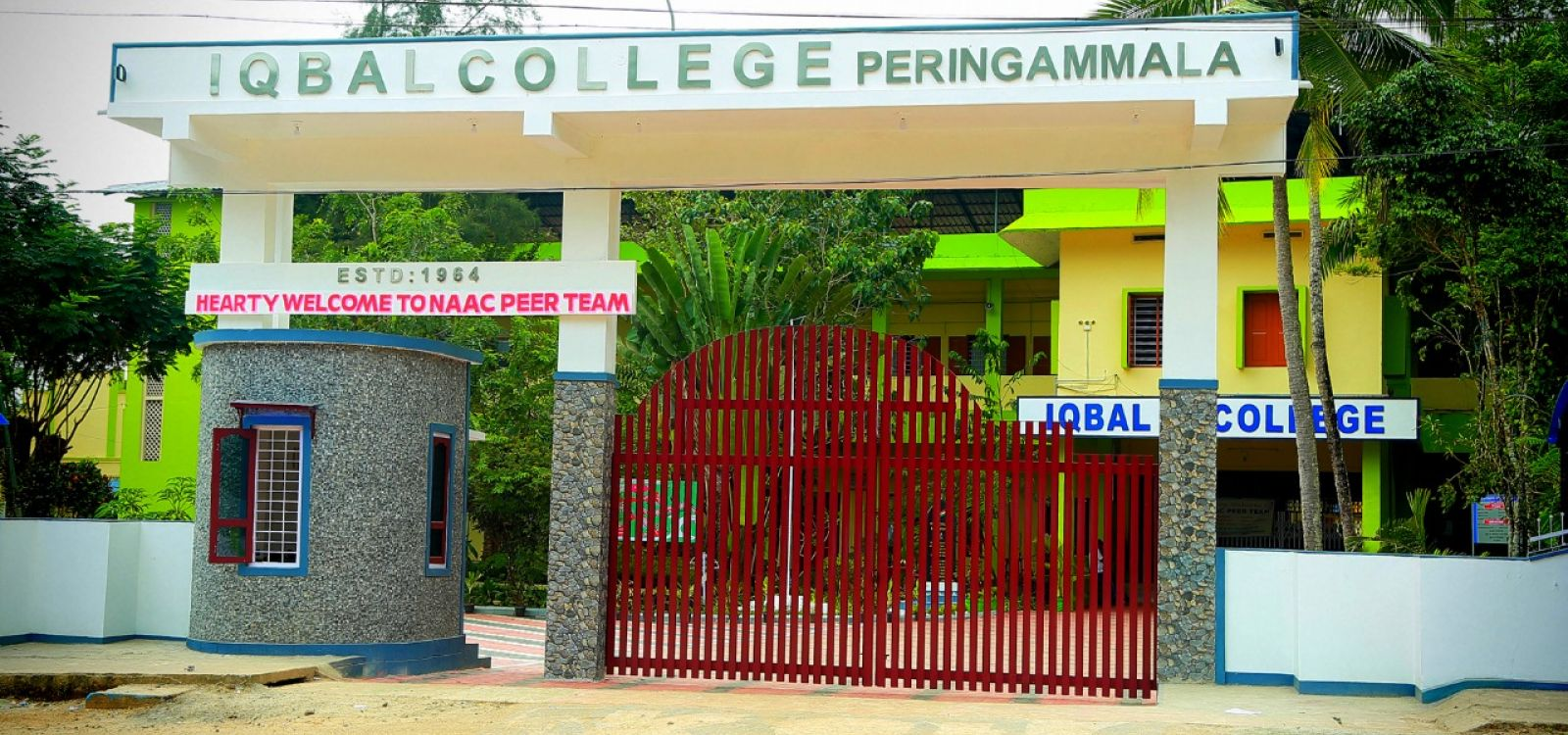
Iqbal College Peringammala

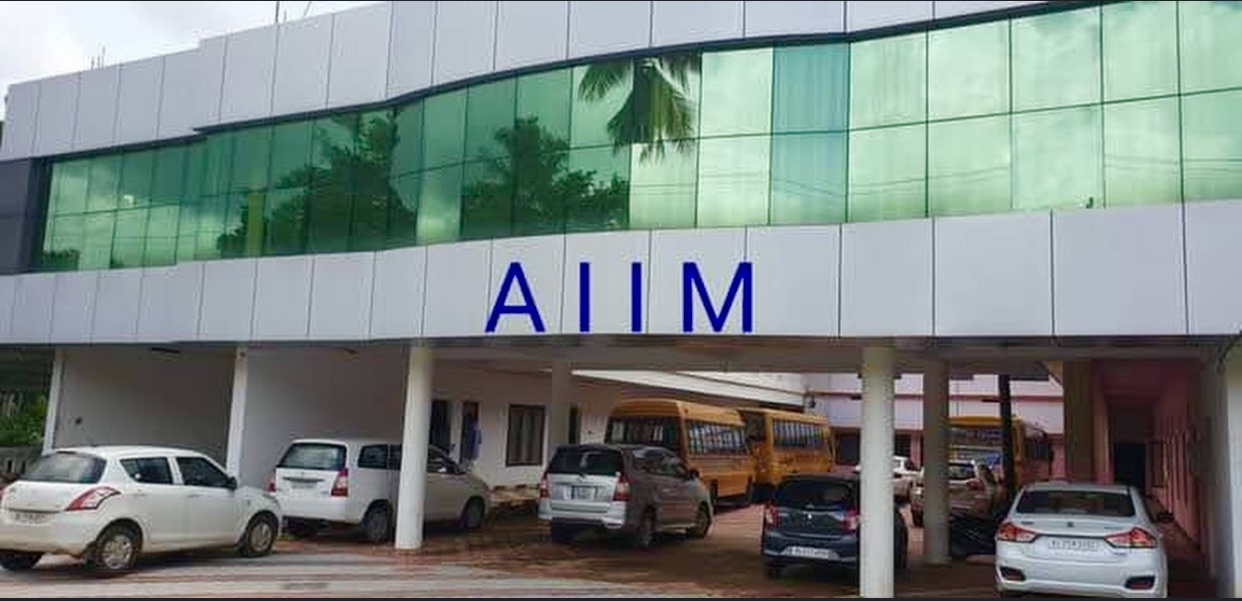
Allama Iqbal Institute of Management

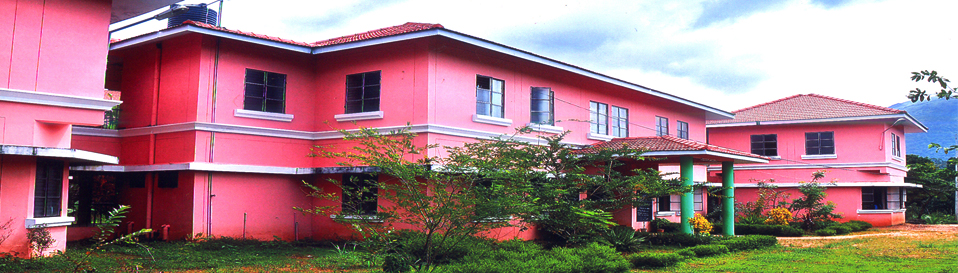
Dr Ambedkar Vidya Niketan Cbse Model School

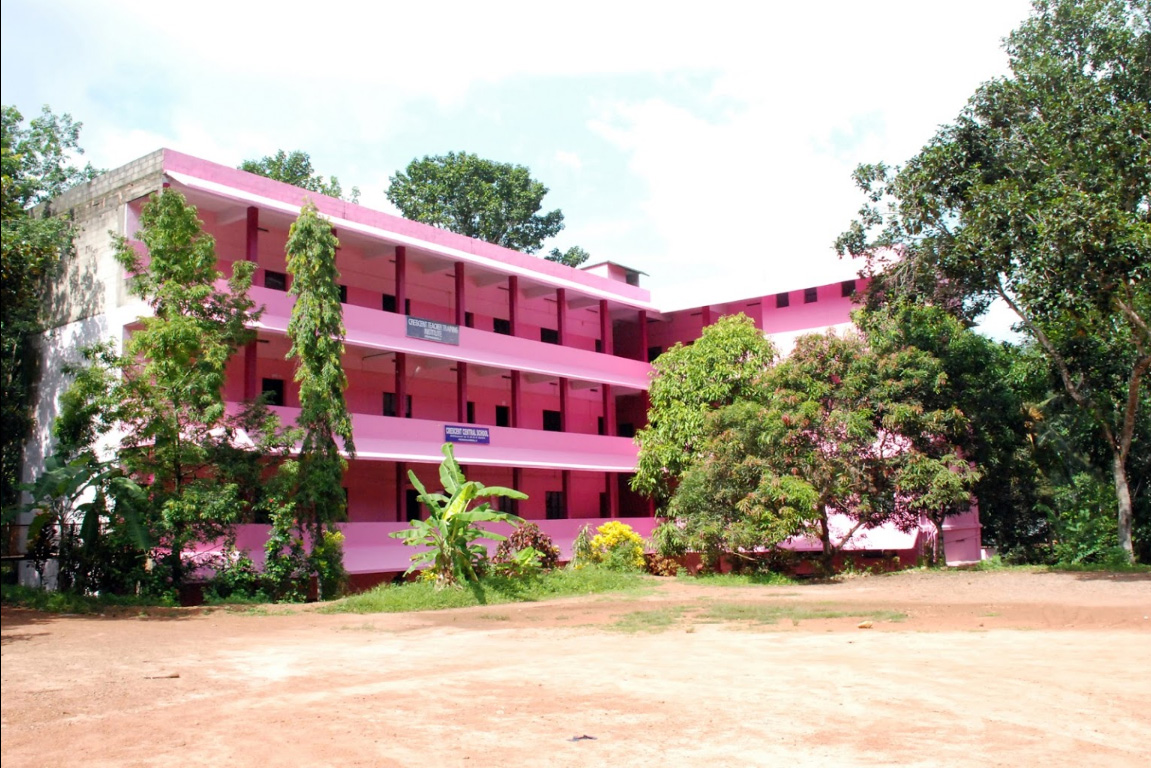
Crescent Central school

- Iqbal College
- Allama Iqbal Institute of Management (MBA)
- Crescent Central School, Panangode, Palode
- Jawahar Navodaya Vidyalaya, Chettachal
- S.K.V Higher Secondary School, Pacha
- N.S.S Higher Secondary School
- Dr Ambedkar Vidya Niketan CBSE Model School, Njaraneeli
- Government UPS Peringamala

== Health care ==
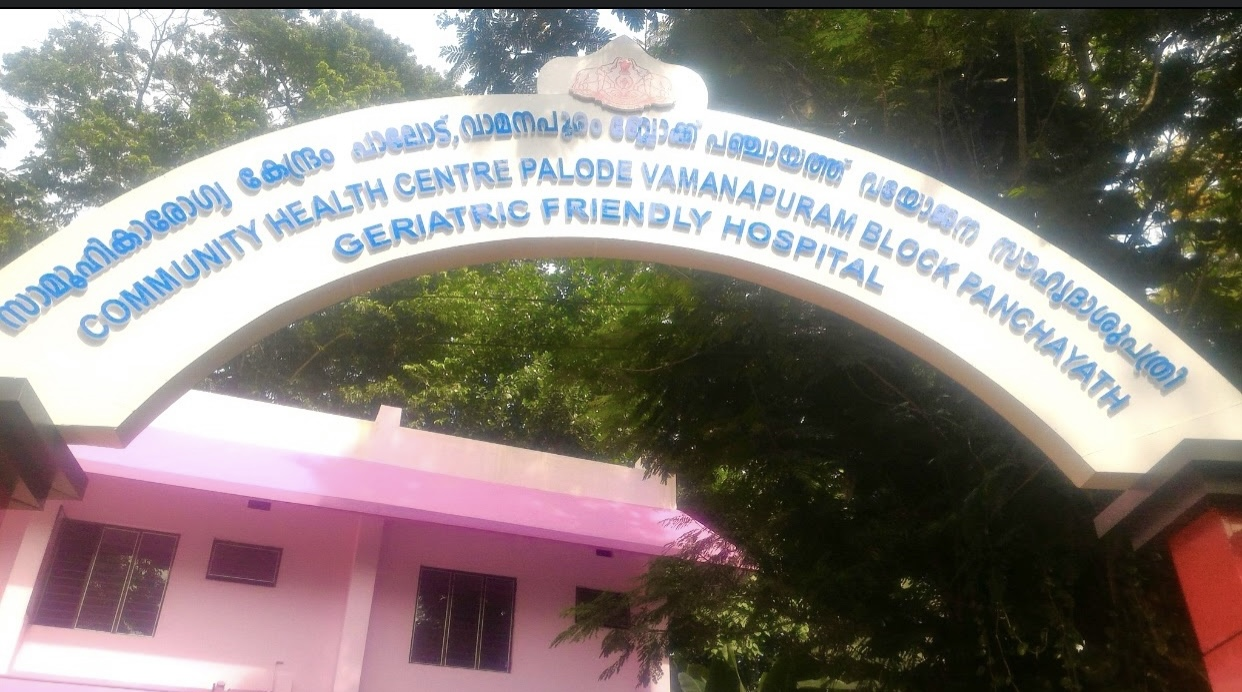
Community Health Centre Palode

Local hospitals and clinics include:

- Govt. Community Health Centre
- Brothers Medical Centre
- White Hospital
- Peringamala Primary Health Center
- Premier Nursing Home
- Arya Hospital

== Government institutions ==
- Jawaharlal Nehru Tropical Botanic Garden & Research Institute
- Kerala State Bharat Scouts and Guides Centre
- Institute of Animal Health & Veterinary Biological Institute
- Chief Disease Investigation Office
- Indian Institute of Oil Palm Research Center (ICAR)
- Government community Health Centre
- Palode Police Station (Circle)
- Kerala State Road Transportation Corporation Palode
- Palode Forest Range Office.
- Integrated Child Development Services (ICDS)
- PWD Guest House Palode
- Shanthi Kudeeram government public crematorium
- Tribal employment exchange career development center and model samanwaya center

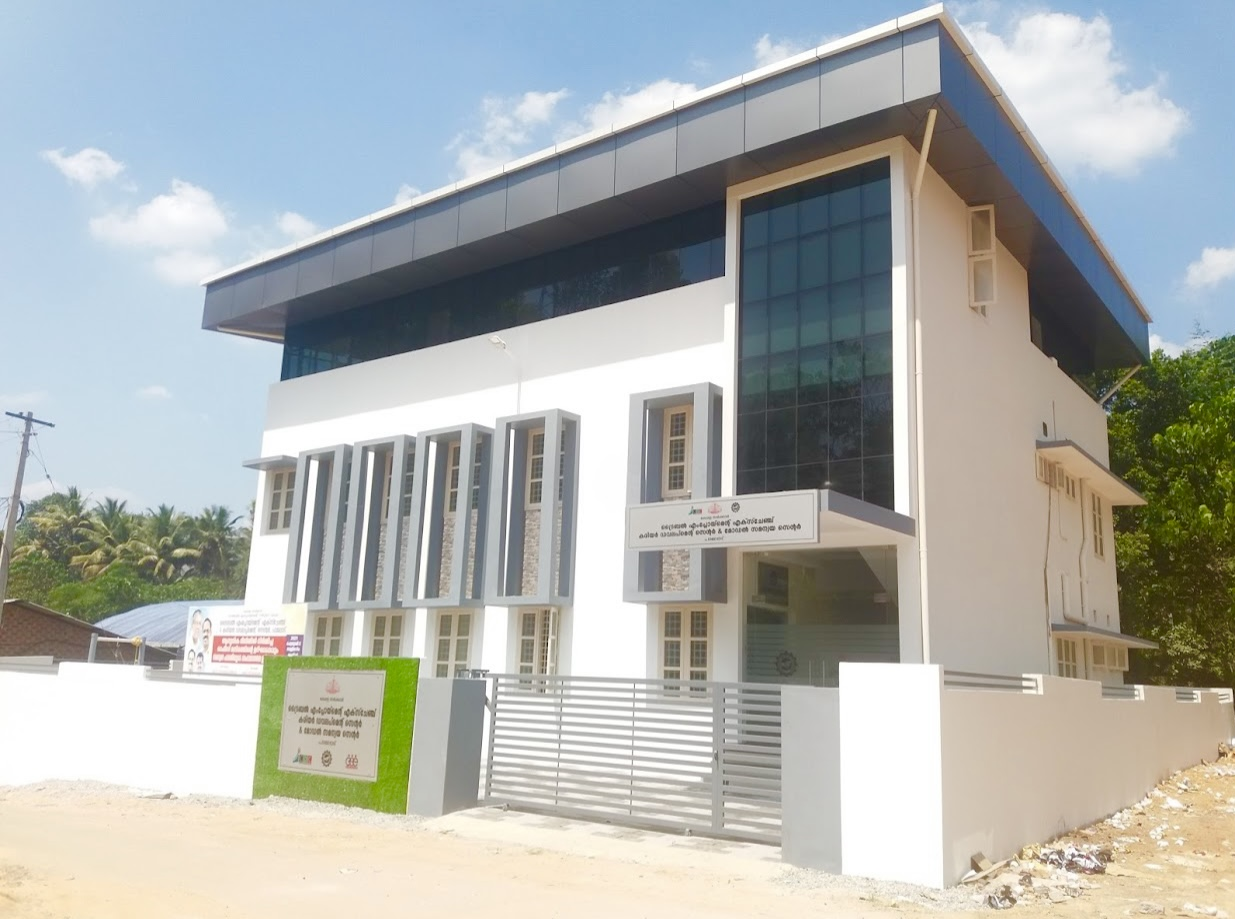
Tribal employment exchange career development center

== Economy ==
Most of Palode's economy comes from retail. There are small and big retail shops around Palode. Timber and Wood related business, and tourism are other major parts of the local economy.

Palode is predominantly an agriculture-dependent area and most of the people are directly or indirectly involved in agriculture for their livelihood. With the spread of rubber cultivations in the 1970s and 1980s in the eastern regions of Kerala, farmers of Palode quickly moved over from coconut and paddy cultivation to rubber, attracted by its high return on investment. In the 1990s, a lot of village youth traveled to the Middle East countries in search of jobs. Now, many adults from the village are working abroad and, therefore, remittance is also a good source of income. The flow of remittance has resulted in an increase in the number of concrete buildings, replacing the old thatched and tiled houses.

=== Palode Mela ===
The Palode Mela started as a livestock fair named "Kaala Chantha" in 1962, and transformed into a Grameen Mela held for 10 days. It is now the national fest of south Kerala, celebrated in February. More than 50,000 people visit the mela per every year. When the period of cattle rolled the economic position of society, before the time of globalisation and economic liberation, the farmers started this mela as a trade fair.
