= Maloram =

Maloram Malapuram
- Local Area
- Location in Kerala, India Maloram (India)
- Coordinates: 11°30′N 75°58′E
- Country: India
- State: Kerala
- District: Kozhikode

Languages
  - Official: Malayalam, English
- Time zone: UTC+5:30 (IST)
- PIN: 673586
- Telephone code: 0495
- Vehicle registration: KL- 57
- Nearest city: Thamarassery
- Climate: wet (Köppen)

Maloram is a place in the Puthuppadi village in Kerala, India. The highway sided Hillside place is one of the cleanest area in Kozhikkode district.

It is under the Thiruvambady Assembly Constituency.

== Demographics ==
As of 2001 the India census, Maloram is the 16th ward of Puthuppadi Panchayath. the Current Ward member is AYISHA BEEVI from Indian Union Muslim League. According to Voters list and other sources, Around 600 Families and 3000 Peoples are living at this area. They are 60% of Lower middle Class families and 20-20 Upper middle class, Poor families.

National Highway 766 (India) Is the main transport road at Maloram.
