= Begur =

Begur may refer to:

- Begur, Bangalore, Karnataka, India
- Begur, Dharwad, Karnataka, India
- Begur, Gundlupet, Karnataka, India
- Begur, Catalonia, Spain
