= Thamarassery Churam =

Mountain pass in Kerala, India

- Wayanad churam
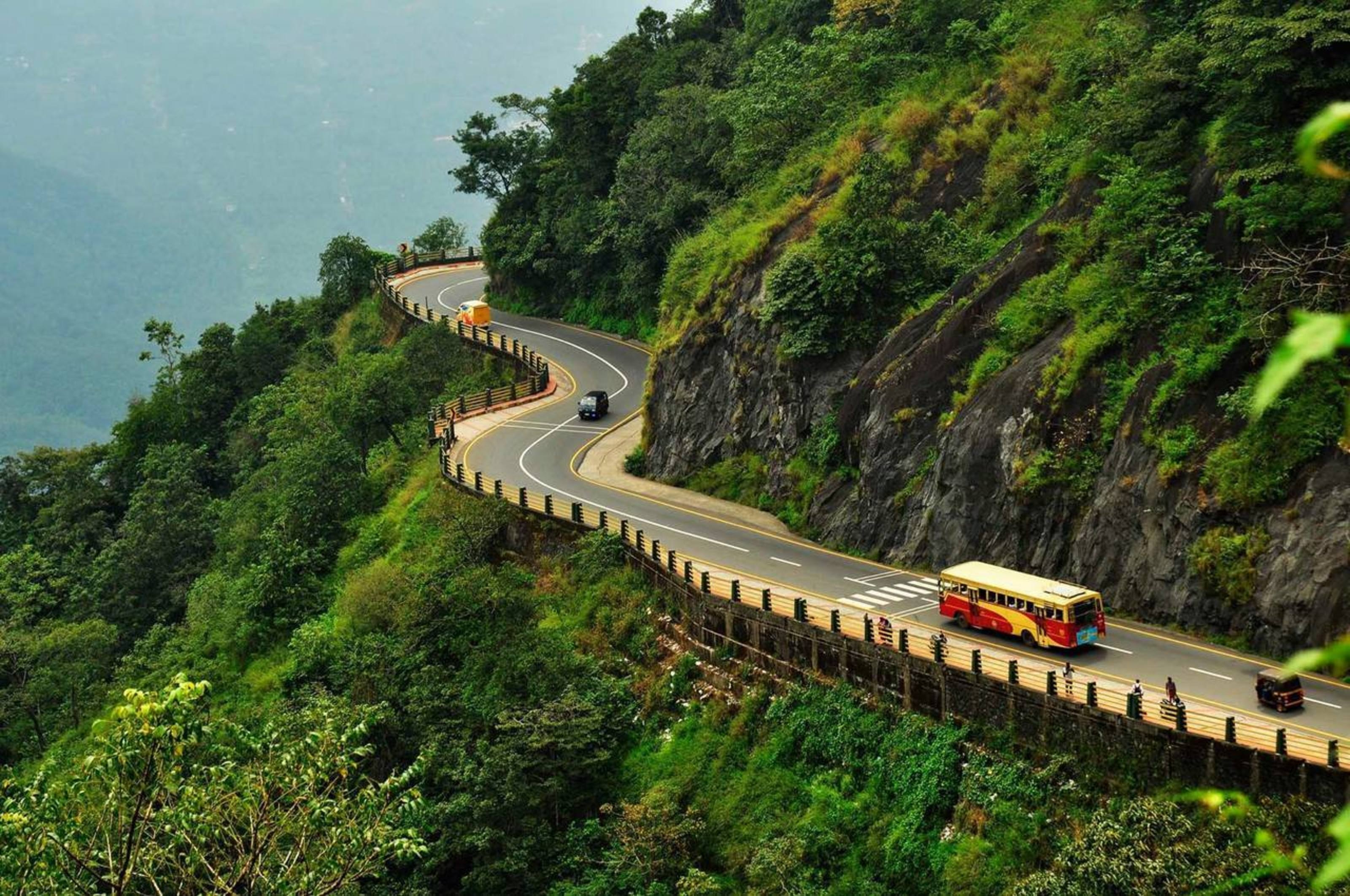
- Viewpoint of Thamarassery churam

- Location within Kerala
- Elevation: 1,000 metres (3,300 ft)
- Traversed by: NH766

Third Approach
- Location: India
- Range: Western Ghats
- Coordinates: 11°29′54″N 76°1′20″E

Thamarassery Churam is a mountain pass located in Kozhikode District in Kerala, India across the Western Ghats. "Churam" is the Malayalam word for mountain pass. It is a part of the National highway 766.

== History, myth ==
The British used to transport spices from Wayanad to Beypore Port, Kozhikode via the Kuttiadi route. Between 1700 and 1750, they searched for a new route which could reduce the distance. For which, they sought the help of Karinthandan Moopan (chief), a tribal leader from the Paniya tribe in Wayanad. The route via the Thamarassery ghat was found with the help of Karinthandan. It is believed that he was later shot to death. It is also believed that Karinthandan's ghost haunted the travellers for a while until it was nailed to a tree by a wizard. The mysterious chain tree is situated at Lakkidi in Wayanad district, 1 km away from the Churam viewpoint.

== Geography ==
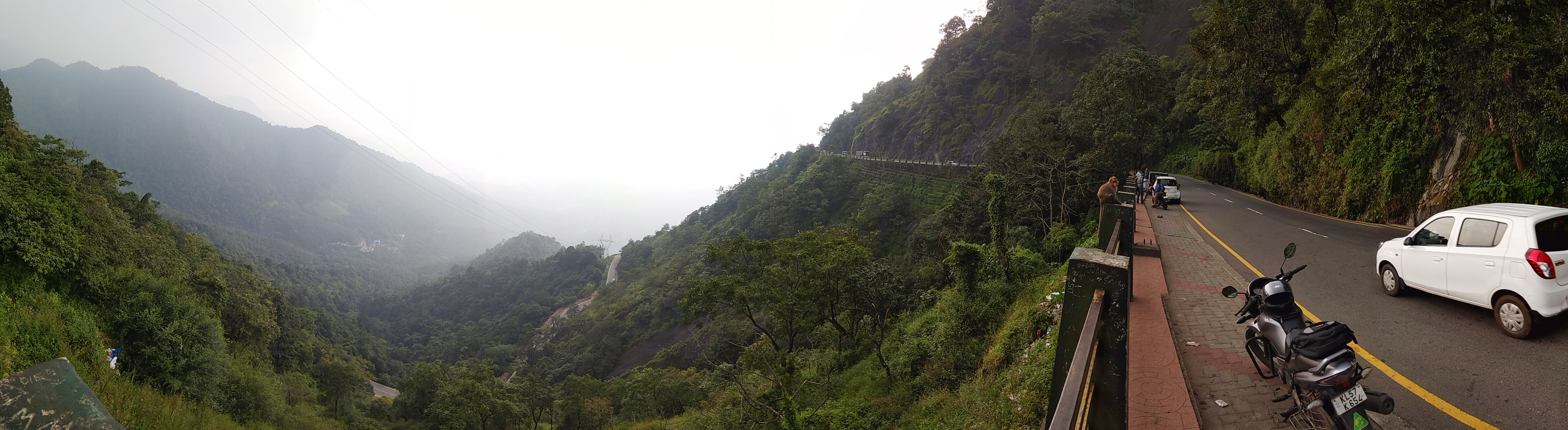
Panoramic view of Thamarassery Churam

It is located around 800 meters above sea level on National Highway 766 (India) in Wayanad District. This area is a popular tourist destination that offers a unique blend of landscape, wildlife sanctuaries, waterfalls, dams, coffee plantations, beautiful hilltop view and varied flora and fauna. This mountain range connects the Kozhikode and Wayanad Districts. It lies within the Western Ghats that run parallel to the western coast of the Indian peninsula, located entirely in India. The highway has nine hairpin bends. Churam is about 14 kilometers in length, starting from Adivaram to Lakkidi Viewpoint.

== See also ==
- Kozhikode–Wayanad Tunnel Road
