= Chamal =

- village
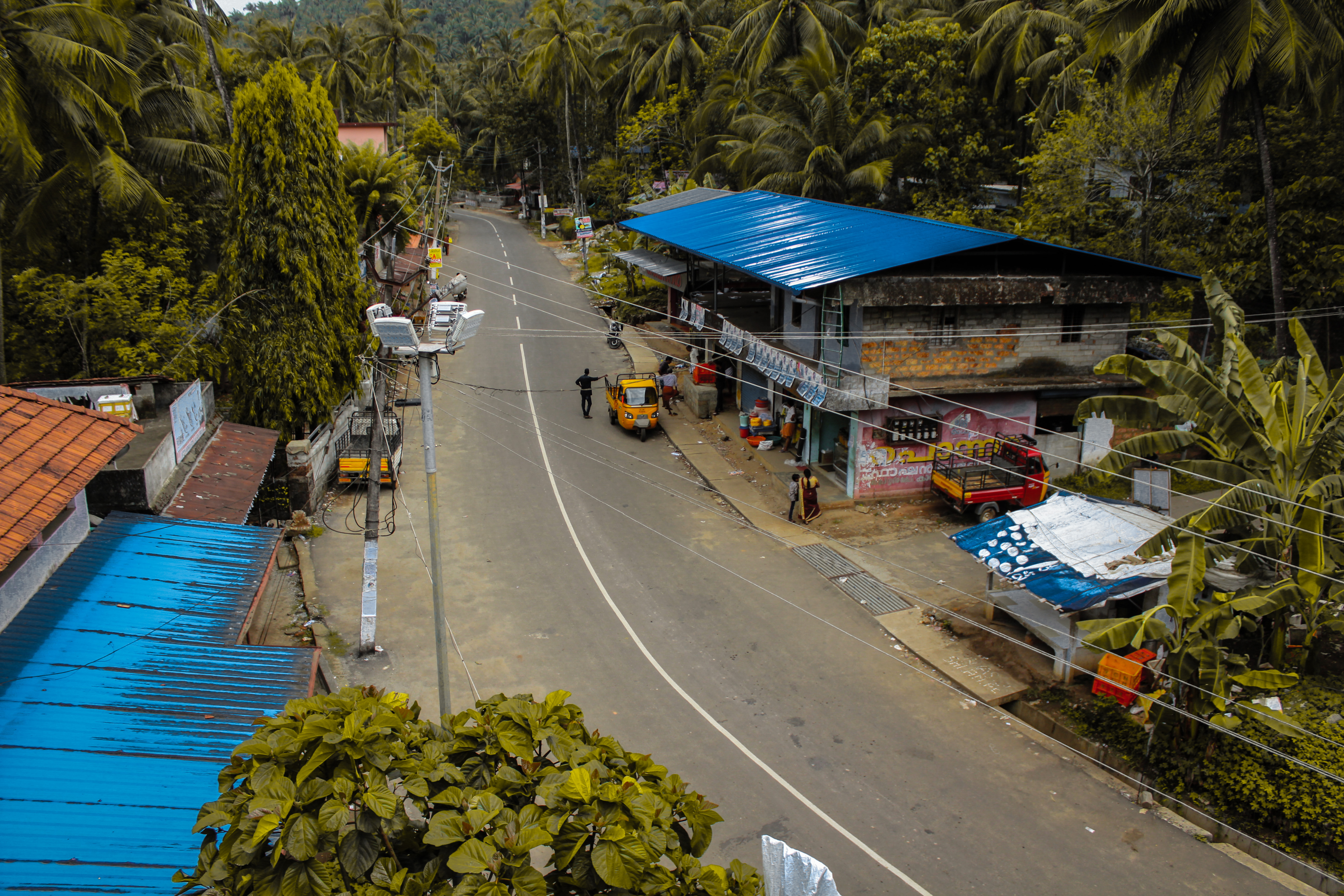
- chamal

- Location within Kerala Location within India
- Coordinates: 11°27′48″N 75°56′31″E
- Country: India
- State: Kerala
- District: Kozhikode

Government
  - Member of Parliament: M K Raghavan
  - MLA (Koduvally): Rasak Karat
  - Panchayath President: Baby Raveendran
  - Panchayath Vice President: Nidheesh Kallulathode

Languages
  - Official: Malayalam, English
- Time zone: UTC+5:30 (IST)
- PIN: 673573
- Sex ratio: 1000:1040 ♂/♀
- Literacy: 88%
- Lok Sabha constituency: Kozhikode
- Vidhan Sabha constituency: Koduvally
- Climate: pleasant (Köppen)

Chamal is a village under Kattippara, village panchayat in Koduvally, Kozhikode district, Kerala, India. It is situated near National Highway-212 (just 3 km distance from NH) and also 3 km distance from Kattippara. In Chamal there is a post office, South Malabar Gramin Bank, school up to 7th standard, Masjid and Church. It is located about 10 km from Thamarassery town. It is a village with a lot of hilly areas. The adjacent villages are Chundakuzhy, Perumpally, Thalayad, Unnikulam, Puthuppadi and Thamarassery.

== History ==
The name Chamal was formed from a literary word Chamalkaram which means 'the beauty'. A man who lived here in the past, despite the fact that the beauty of this place and thought that it was so named.

== Economy ==
The major source of income in this village is agriculture. Majority of the population depend on the agriculture crops such as rice, vegetable, rubber, coconut, arecanut, ginger, pepper etc. A very minority only depend on business and government jobs. There are many self-help groups, small scale industries and a kudumbasree units active in this place. Other major sources of the people are products of agriculture, daily wagers, constructions and other businesses.

== Tourism ==
The major tourist places in this village are poovanmala forest and Kulamala which are good for trekking and sightseeing. Wild animals like monkeys, deer, wild pigs, wild buffaloes and a large variety of insects and birds are found in the innermost forest area of both Kulamala and poovanmala forest.

== Climate ==
Chamal has a generally cool humid climate with a very hot season extending from March to May. The average annual rainfall is more than 3500 mm and it is the highest rain fall in this region.

== Demographics ==
Population consists of mainly Christian, Hindu and Muslim communities.

== Educational institutions ==
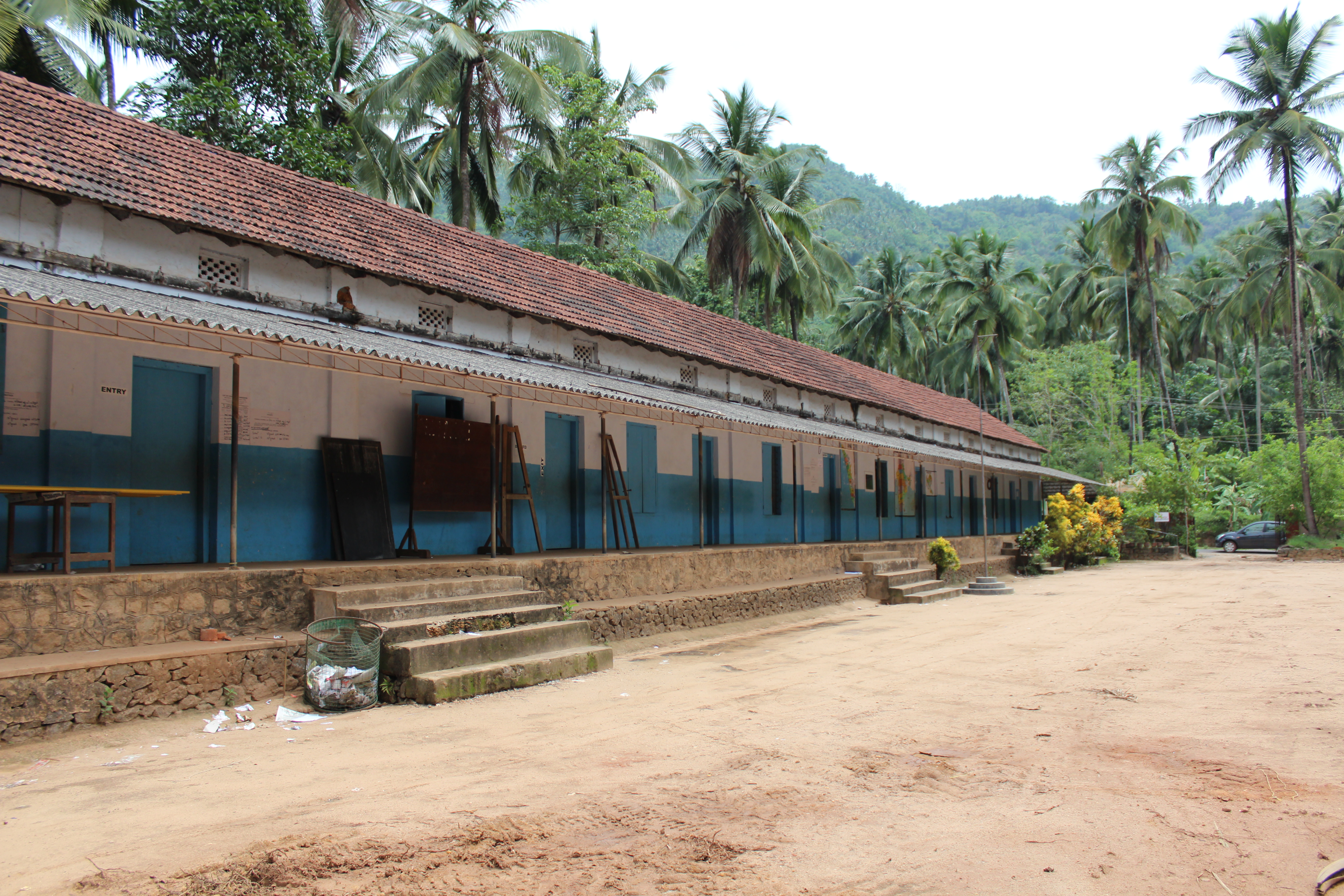
Nirmala UP School Chamal

Chundankuzhi L.P School and Nirmala U.P. School are the major educational institutions (both are aided) in this village and students from nearby places also depend on these schools for their formal and basic education. Other than these institutions there are preliminary schools, KGs and anganwadis

== Government institutions ==
The 'Akshaya e kendra' and 'post office' (673573). are the only government institution in this locality.

== Transport ==
Chamal village connects to other parts of India through Calicut city on the west and Thamarassery town on the east. National highway No.66 passes through Kozhikode and the northern stretch connects to Mangalore, Goa and Mumbai. The southern stretch connects to Cochin and Trivandrum. The eastern National Highway No.54 going through Adivaram connects to Kalpetta, Mysore and Bangalore. The nearest airports are at Kannur and Kozhikode. The nearest railway station is at Kozhikode.

== Gallery ==
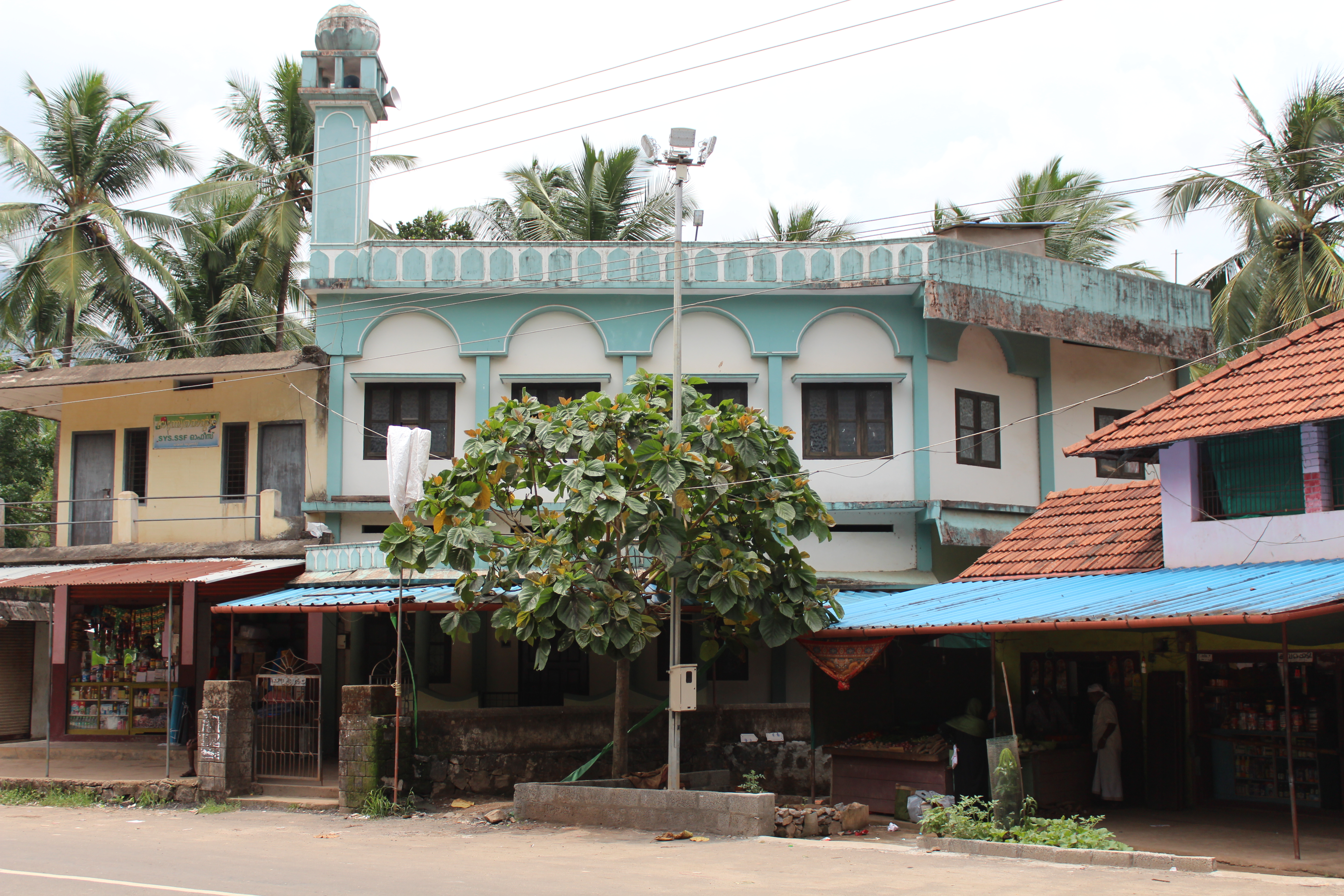
Chamal town Juma Masjid

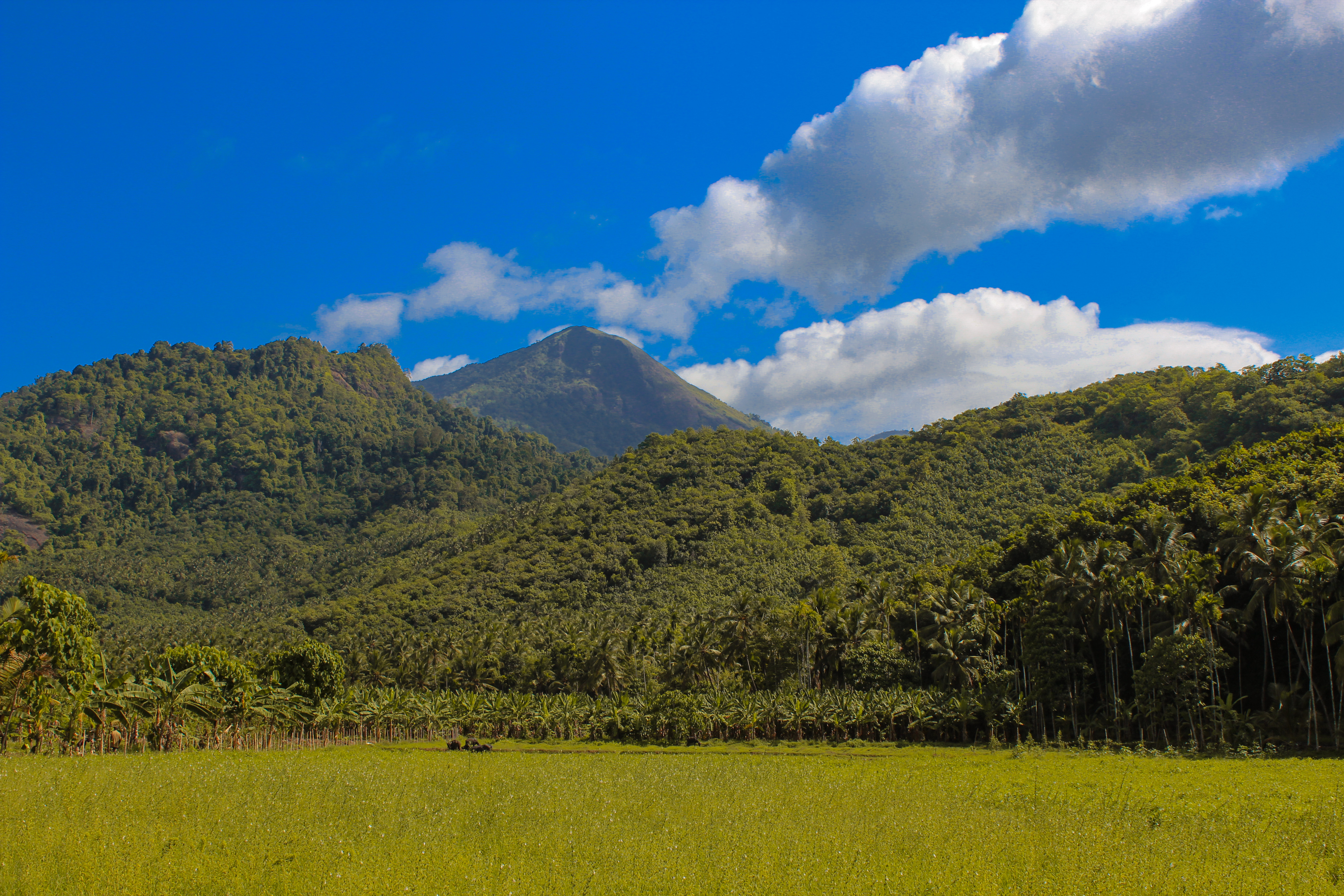
Landscape of Chamal

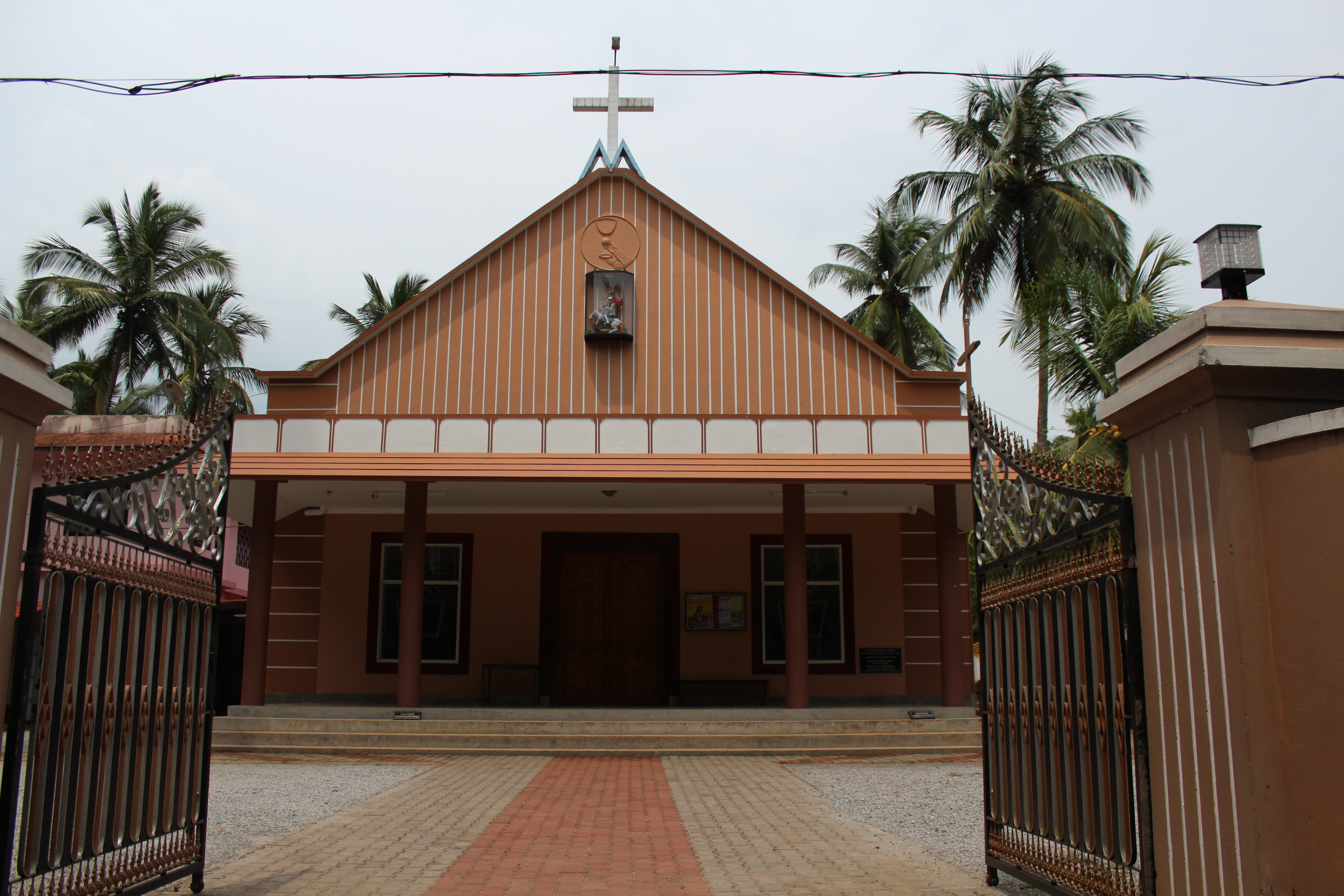
St. George church Chamal
