= Wayanad Tunnel =

Proposed tunnel in Kerala, India

Kozhikode- Wayanad Tunnel
- Interactive map of Kozhikode- Wayanad Tunnel

Overview
- Location: Kerala, India
- Start: 2025
- End: 2029

Operation
- Traffic: Automotive
- Character: Passenger and Freight

Technical
- Length: 8,100 m (26,600 ft)
- No. of lanes: 4

The Kozhikode–Wayanad Tunnel Road, also known as the Anakkampoyil–Kalladi–Meppadi Tunnel Road, is an under-construction twin-tube road tunnel project in the Indian state of Kerala. The project consists of two parallel unidirectional tunnels, each carrying two traffic lanes, along with approach roads connecting Anakkampoyil in Kozhikode district to Meppadi in Wayanad district. This 8.1km road tunnel, is the third longest underpass in India would run through the sensitive hills and forests of the Western Ghats. This tunnel will be an alternate bypass to Thamarassery Churam by reducing travel time and distance to Kozhikode and Wayanad.

The project is constructing by Kerala Government with SPV agreement with Konkan Railway Corporation Limited with construction cost of ₹2134 crore. Dilip Buildcon Limited awarded tunnel work tender and Bridge, approach road work tender awarded to Punia Construction Company. National Highway Authority of India is considering Wayanad Tunnel as a bypass for Thamarassery Ghat in NH 766 and currently undertaking Detailed Project Report (DPR) studies for making Kunnamangalam to Kalpetta stretch realigning via SH 83. As Wayanad Tunnel is already a 4 lane road and have got all environmental clearances including Stage-II forest clearance, there is a high-demand to realign NH 766 via this route and make Kozhikode- Sulthan Bathery- Mysore road through Wayanad Tunnel.

== Kalladi mudslide disaster ==
The Kalladi mudslide disaster occurred on 7 July 2026 at the Kalladi construction site of the Kozhikode–Wayanad Tunnel Road project. Heavy monsoon rainfall triggered a landslip that caused excavated soil, rock, and debris to collapse onto the construction site, burying workers, construction equipment, and nearby infrastructure. Rescue operations were carried out by the National Disaster Response Force (NDRF), Kerala Fire and Rescue Services, the Kerala Police, and local volunteers over several days. According to official reports, the disaster resulted in six fatalities, while several other workers were rescued or sustained injuries. Following the incident, the Government of Kerala temporarily suspended construction activities and ordered investigations into the causes of the landslip. The inquiries included examining whether the disposal of excavated material and other construction practices complied with applicable engineering and environmental standards.

== Route ==
Kozhikode - Kunnamangalam - Mukkam - Thiruvambady- Anakkampoyil - Kalladi - Meppadi - Kalpetta - Sulthan Bathery - Gundlupete - Mysuru

== Features ==
Wayanad Tunnel has following features:

- Built via the New Austrian Tunnelling Method, which relies on monitored rock.
- Twin Tube Tunnel ( 2 way lane each directions, total 4 lane road) with all weather conditions
- Cross Passages: Emergency escape cross-passages link the twin tunnels every 300 m, ensuring a safe, immediate evacuation corridor for drivers in the event of an accident or vehicle fire.
- Environmental and Traffic Controls: It is outfitted with heavy-duty automated mechanical ventilation systems to manage exhaust, smart LED lighting layouts, 24/7 CCTV surveillance arrays, emergency call stations, and specialized integrated traffic signaling.
- Reduced Gradient: The alignment features a significantly lower, smoother gradient than the grueling hairpins of the old Churam, drastically minimizing vehicle mechanical stress and fuel consumption for heavy transport.
- Cleared all Environmental and Forest Clearances. Cleared all Supreme Court and High Court Law Clearances.

== Overview ==
The project started in 1980's by public interest of people in Thiruvambady area. In 2011–2016, UDF government allowed fund in Budget for preliminary survey for this project considering a bypass for Thamarassery Ghat. In 2016–2021, under CPIM government considered Tunnel Project as best proposals to minimise environmental impacts. In 2021–2026, Konkan Railway was appointed as SPV for tunnel project by CPIM Government and proceeded for further National green clearances. On 2024 September, Konkan Railway opened tenders for project and out of 7 bids Dilip Buildcon Limited awarded the project for ₹1341 crore with a construction period of 4 years. Approach Bridge at Iruvanjippuzha tender awarded to Punia Construction Company at ₹73.86 crores. Tunnel Construction officially started on 31 August 2025 and rock excavation started early 2026 by getting Forest Stage-II clearance. In 2026–2031, INC government decided to move forward with project giving financial approvals considering traffic chaos in Thamarassery Churam. It is anticipated a 4 lane bypass to existing Thamaraserry Ghat of NH 766 of Kozhikode - Muthanga - Mysore road will come through this Tunnel.

It is considered significant since it easily connects business, industrial, and tourism areas such as Bengaluru and Mysore with Kozhikode. The existing route via the Thamarassery Ghat is time-consuming and frequently disrupted by landslides and rain, making the tunnel road a much-needed option. The new tunnel road is expected to reduce this traffic congestion in Thamarassery Ghat and also improve the cargo transit from Karnataka.

The twin-tube tunnel's entire length will be 8.17 km. In September 2020, the tunnel construction survey began. In lieu of the land used for the project, the Government of Kerala has given the Government of India to plant trees on 17.263 ha and declared them as reserve forest. The construction of Tunnel started on 31 August 2025 with a 4 years construction timer period. Rock excavation started early 2026.

== NH 766 Thamarassery Ghat Bypass and Kozhikode - Mysore 4 lane Proposal ==
NHAI/MORTH is already making DPR for 4 lane development of Kozhikode - Muthanga section of NH 766 and Thamarassery Ghat Bypass. As Wayanad Tunnel located in close proximity to the Thamarassery Ghat section, with an aerial distance of less than 10 km there is a high demand to realign NH 766 via Wayanad Tunnel from Kunnamangalam to Kalpetta. Wayanad Tunnel project already obtained the required forest and environmental clearances including SEAC and SEIAA approval, MoEFCC stage-II clearance. Integrating this tunnel corridor into the DPR would offer substantial advantages, including:

- Saving approximately 17.23 ha of forest land and no need of compensatory afforestation
- Elimination of the need for further forest and environmental clearances of 5 years process
- Improved safety, reduced gradient, and all-weather connectivity through twin tube Tunnel
- Saving ₹2000 crore for Thamarassery Ghat Bypass
- Faster and more sustainable long-term connectivity between Kozhikode and Wayanad through 4 lane Kunnamangalam - Mukkam - Anakkampoyil - Tunnel - Meppadi - Kalpetta Bypass - Meenangadi - Sulthan Bathery and connectivity to Kozhikode, Palakkad, Calicut Airport and NH 66.
- Easy Land Acquisition of SH 83 and converting to 4 lane NH 766
- Thamarassery Ghat heavy traffic issue can resolve

Such an approach would ensure environmentally responsible planning, faster project implementation, and alignment with ongoing state-supported infrastructure initiatives in the region.

== See also ==
- State Highway 83
- Kuthiran Tunnel
