= Puthuppadi =

Puthuppadi Grama Panchayat
- village
- Interactive map of Puthuppadi Grama Panchayat
- Coordinates: 11°30′N 75°58′E
- Country: India
- State: Kerala
- District: Kozhikode

Area
  - Total: 64.75 km^{2} (25.00 sq mi)

Population (2011)
  - Total: 25,965
  - Density: 401.0/km^{2} (1,039/sq mi)

Languages
  - Official: Malayalam, English
- Time zone: UTC+5:30 (IST)
- PIN: 673586
- Telephone code: 0495
- Vehicle registration: KL- 57
- Climate: wet (Köppen)

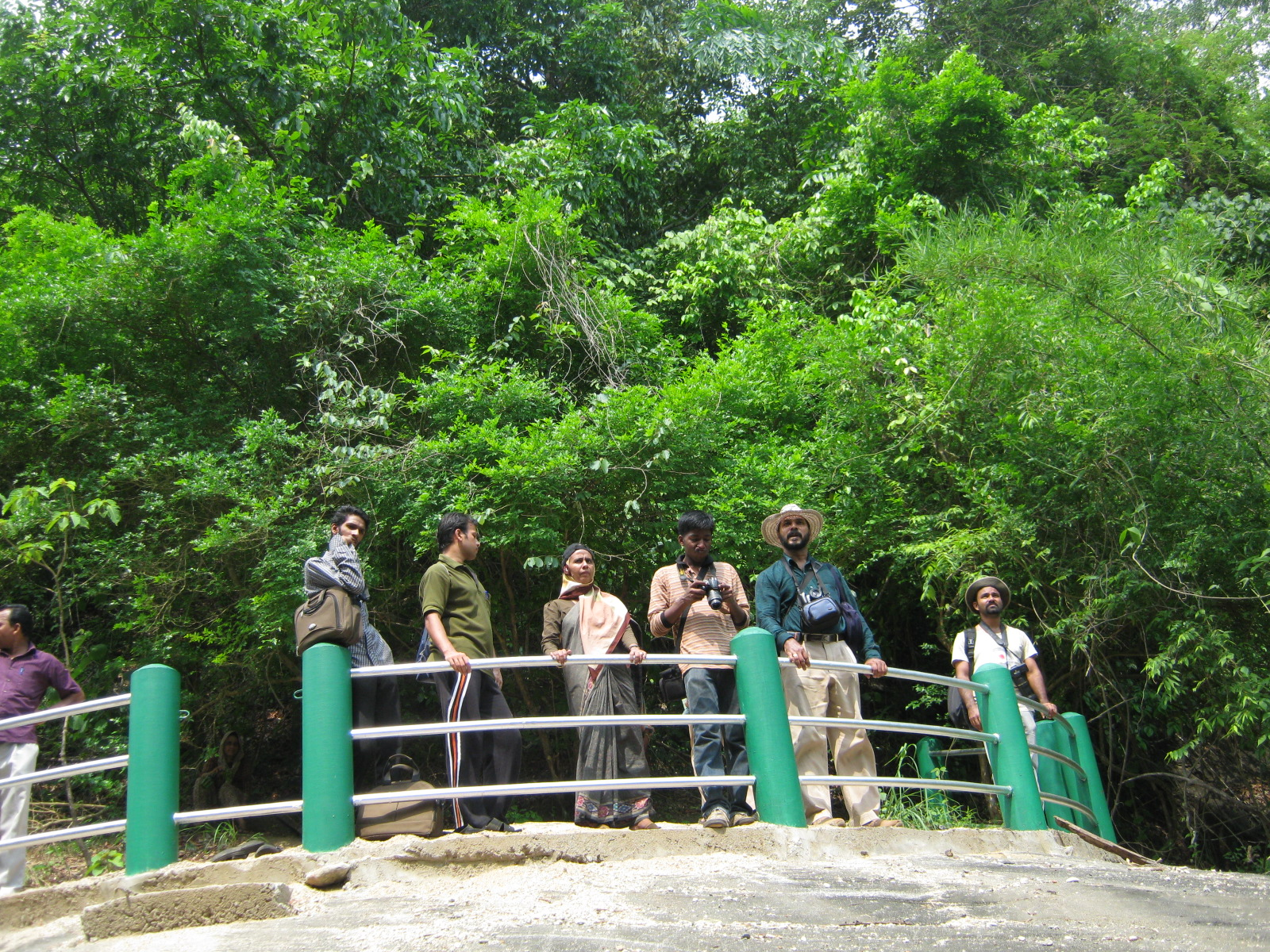
Kakkavayal Viewpoint

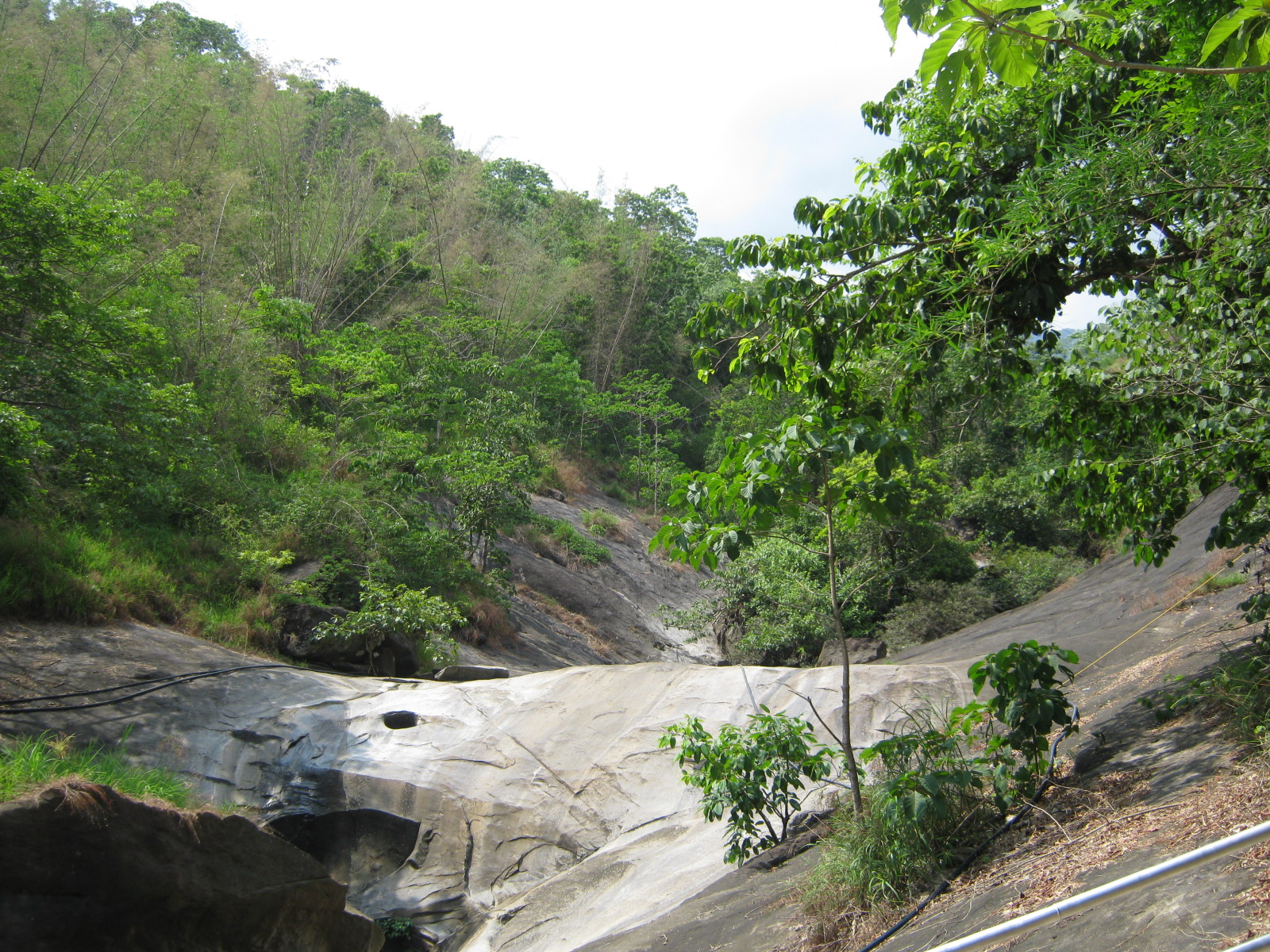
Kakkavayal Hills

Puthuppadi is a village and Panchayath located in Kozhikode district of Kerala, India. Puthuppadi Grama Panchayat covers an area of 64.75 km^{2} and is spread over the villages of Engapuzha and Puthuppadi. The panchayat is bounded on the north by Thamarassery, Kattippara, Kodenchery, Vythiri (Wayanad) panchayats, on the east by Vythiri (Wayanad) and Kodancheri panchayats, on the south by Thamarassery and Kodancheri panchayats and on the west by Kattippara panchayat. Famous Wayandan Churam or Wayandan Pass, which has nine hairpins between Adivaram of Puthuppady Panchayath and Lakkidi of Vythri Panchayath, is in Puthuppadi Panchayat.

Puthuppadi Panchayat is a beautiful agricultural village located near the Wayanad Pass, which is a natural fort that separates the districts of Kozhikode and Wayanad. Puthuppadi Panchayat is located 40 km northeast of Kozhikode town, adjoining Wayanad district. Many rivers and streams originating from the Western Ghats flow through this panchayath. The Kozhikode-Mysore-Kollagal-Bangalore National Highway, NH 766, passes through the heart of the panchayat.

== History ==
It is said that the name Puthuppadi was derived from the word Paadi, meaning small shelter, that was made by the old estate owners and landlords to house their workers brought from other places.

Until the enactment of the Kerala Panchayat Act 1960, on 1 January 1962, Puthuppadi Panchayat was part of the Thamarassery Panchayat which functioned under the Madras Village Act. The governing body was constituted on 12 February 1962 under the leadership of Special Officer C. Raghavan. On 18 December 1963, P. P. Sayeed became the first President of the Panchayat.

The panchayat office, which had to operate alternately in many places without its own headquarters, was made permanent with the construction of a building on the land donated by the first president PP Sayeed.

== Administration ==
Puthuppadi falls under the Thiruvambady State Assembly Constituency and the Wayanad Lok Sabha Constituency. Beena Thankachan is the president of the Puduppadi Grama Panchayat.

== Education ==
During the first half of the twentieth century, migration became widespread and large-scale cultivation began. Thus, the early cultural institutions must have been the places of worship established here belonging to different religions. Attempts to establish a high school and a library in Puthuppadi began in the 1970s. As a result, Puthuppadi Govt. High School was started in 1974 and Deepti Library in 1976. However, schools have been functioning here since 1949. The primary school in the village was the Elementary School started by the Malabar District Board in Kaithapoyil in 1949. This school is now known as Puthuppadi GMUP School. The second school is St. Anthony's School, which was started in 1950 under the auspices of Kannoth Catholic Church with Government approval. In 1955, it became the first UP school. The third is the NALP School which was started in 1951 in Manamel Estate in Engapuzha. It became NAUP in 1959 and MGM High School in 1983. In view of the absence of a high school in the panchayat, the land purchased under the leadership of K. P. Marcos in the name of St. Ostathios was later handed over to the Government and Puthuppadi Govt. High School was sanctioned in 1974 after paying a bond of Rs. 25,000. It is one of the high academic schools in Kozhikode district. The school has long been ranked second in government schools in terms of pass percentage. The children of this Panchayat still depend on educational institutions in Kozhikode town for higher education.

== Culture ==
Although there is no accurate information about the life of the people before the twentieth century, the evidence found at Ambalakandi, Chaliyakkadavu, Kunjukulam, Kurumarukandi and Kakkavayal, as well as the ruins of many ruined temples, indicate that highly civilized people had lived here. Traditional arts and crafts are becoming unpopular today.

Everyone, regardless of caste or creed, participates in temple festivals and church festivals. Duffmuttu, Kolkali and Udukupattu are active in some places. Before independence, Puthuppadi did not have much to say in the field of education. It is said that some temples were held at Engapuzha, 26th Mile and Kannoth.

In the early days, there was little effort to cultivate the habit of reading or to establish cultural centers in the vicinity of the plantation for a living. However, the people here have always been keen on maintaining a high cultural awareness and the progressive thinking, contribution and tolerance that is part of it. Deepti is the first club in the panchayat with its own building and about 500 members.

== Sports ==
The panchayat has contributed national level talents in the field of sports. Arjuna Award winning Indian volleyball player Sally Joseph, handball Indian team member Sheeba Mathew, T. M. Abdulrahman winning medals in high jump and athletics at national competitions, Lousy Kurian who have won medals at national competitions, cross country national Rosly Abraham, and Kho Kho national player K. P. David are all contributions of Puthuppadi

== Transportation ==
Although the rugged cliffs and rocks succumbed to the will of the ancestors for their livelihood, the transportable roads and vehicular facilities at that time were simply a mirage. However, recognizing the strength of team spirit and the important role that roads play in the development of the country, they had built many local roads by the time the panchayat was formed. This was followed by the construction of more roads. The Kozhikode-Mysore-Kollegal National Highway, NH 766, which passes through the center of the panchayat, plays a vital role in the road map of Kerala. Thus, the Panchayat has a well-developed network of roads that connects the Panchayat with other places in the district as well as in the state. Buses, both Government-owned (KSRTC) and private-owned, offer services to various destinations.

The nearest railway station is Kozhikode Railway Station (CLT) which is at a distance of 40 kilometers. The nearest airport is Calicut International Airport, which is at a distance of 53 kilometers.

== Ecology ==
Puthuppadi Panchayath, which is in the third position in Koduvally Block Panchayat in terms of area, is fully covered by the hilly landscape. The landscape of the panchayath includes hundreds of small and large hills, numerous streams and rivers originating from the Western Ghats and paddy fields. Red soil is the main soil type. Black sandstone, Sandstone and Gravel are also found. The fertile soil is suitable for the cultivation of coconut, paddy, spices and rubber. The climate in the panchayat is generally favorable. The heat is very low and it also gets more rain in the middle of the year.

== Demographics ==
As of 2011, Puthuppadi has a population of 25965.
