= Kuthiran =

- place
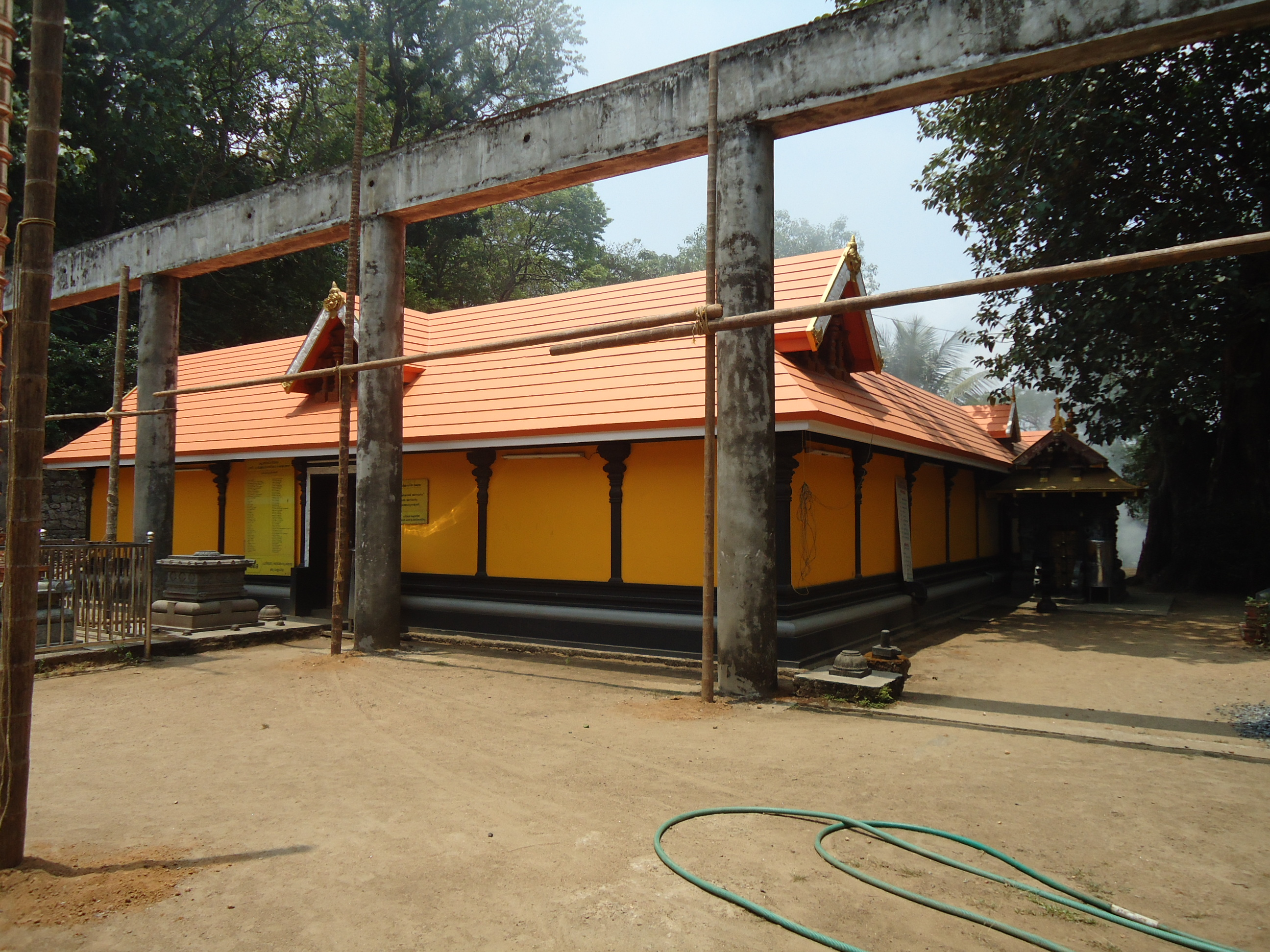
- Kuthiranmala Sree Dharmasastha temple

- Location in Kerala, India Kuthiran (India)
- Coordinates: 10.575°N 76.375°E
- Country: India
- State: Kerala
- District: Thrissur

Government
  - Body: Pananchery Grama Panchayath

Languages
  - Official: Malayalam, English
- Time zone: UTC+5:30 (IST)
- Vehicle registration: KL- 08

Kuthiran is a mountainous terrain in Thrissur district of Kerala state, south India. It is located on the banks of Manali river, which has its source in the nearby mountains. It is in between Thrissur and Palakkad. There is a famous Ayyappan Temple located here by the side of the highway. It is in the NH544 highway. This place is known for Kuthiran Tunnel that shortens travel time between Thrissur and Palakkad districts.

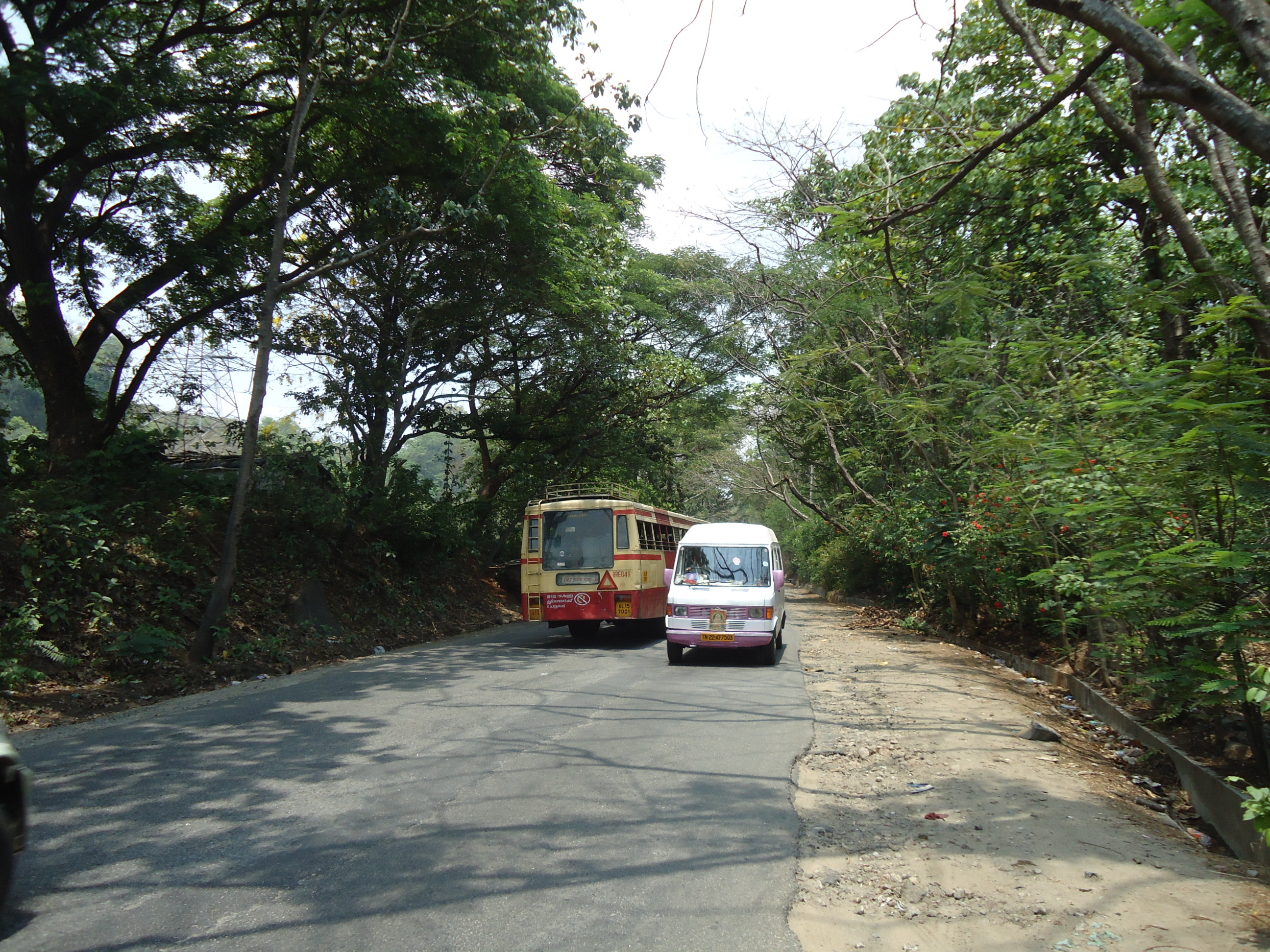
Kuthiran Road

Kuthiran is infamous for the bad condition of the National Highway. Accidents are very common across this stretch. Recent news clips show that people traveling between Trichur and Palakkad are choosing alternate roads like the Trichur-Shoranur-Ottapalam-Palakkad.

== See also ==
- Kuthiran Tunnel
