= Kolikkal =

Village in Kerala, India

Kolikkal is a suburban village near Poonoor, in Kerala State. Kolikkal is in Kattippara Grama Panchayat and about 5 km away from Thamarassery town. The Poonoor river flows through the heart of Kolikkal. The village is mostly known for a rubber plantation. Fishing during the beginning of the monsoon season is one of the most prominent hobbies of the village men. Autorickshaws are a common sight in Kolikkal.

The old Kolikkal Mahallu Juma Masjid, built in the 1950s, is one of the oldest Masjids in the district.

There are number of people who have migrated from neighbouring districts like Malappuram to work on the plantation.

== Schools ==
- Ishaath Public School
- Grace English Medium School

== Development ==
Kolikkal village is well developed in many aspects. The village has its own mobile application named Kolikkal Info.

== Transportation ==
Kolikkal village connects to other parts of India through Calicut city on the west and Thamarassery town on the east. National highway No.66 passes through Kozhikode and the northern stretch connects to Mangalore, Goa and Mumbai. The southern stretch connects to Cochin and Trivandrum. The eastern National Highway No.54 going through Adivaram connects to Kalpetta, Mysore and Bangalore. The nearest airports are at Kannur and Kozhikode. The nearest railway station is at Kozhikode.
