= Kuthiran Tunnel =

Tunnel in Kerala, India

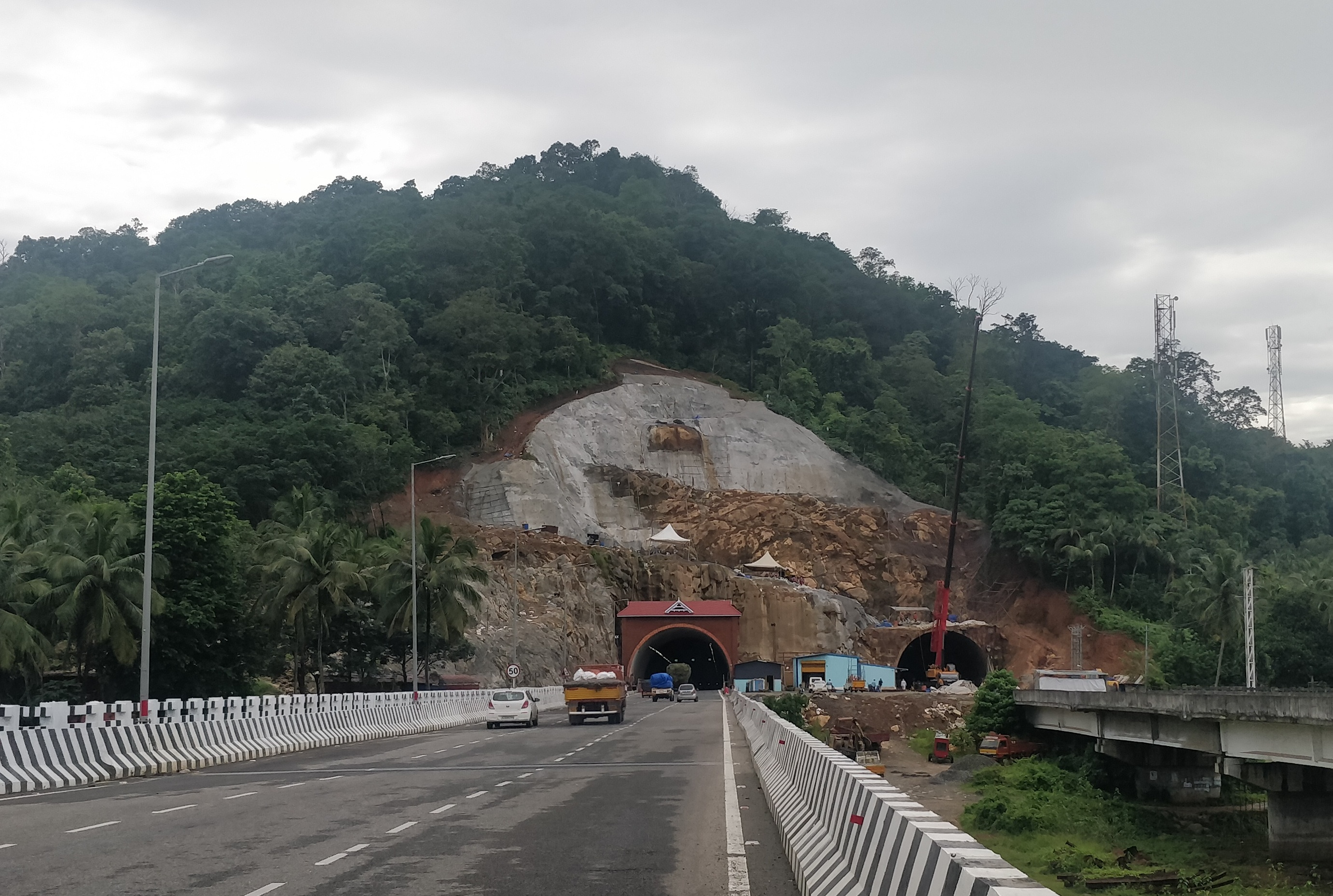
- Entrance of Kuthiran tunnel
- Interactive map of Kuthiran Tunnel

Overview
- Location: Kuthiran, Thrissur, Kerala, India
- Coordinates: 10.5715°N 76.381°E
- Status: Operational
- Route: NH 544
- Start: 10.5715°N 76.378°E
- End: 10.572°N 76.386°E

Operation
- Work began: 2016
- Opened: 31 July 2021 (4 years ago) (Left tunnel) 20 January 2022 (4 years ago) (Right tunnel)
- Owner: National Highways Authority of India
- Operator: National Highways Authority of India
- Traffic: Automotive
- Character: Passenger and Freight
- Toll: None

Technical
- Length: Left tube 955 m (3,133 ft); Right tube 944 m (3,097 ft)
- No. of lanes: 3 lanes per tube (6 lanes total in twin-tube with dual carriageway)
- Operating speed: Lane 1 - 40–80 km/h (25–50 mph) Lane 2 - 40–80 km/h (25–50 mph) Lane 3 - 40–80 km/h (25–50 mph)
- Tunnel clearance: 10 metres (33 ft)
- Width: 14 metres (46 ft)

Kuthiran Tunnel is a twin-tube six-lane highway tunnel in the South Indian state of Kerala. The tunnel is located on the National Highway 544 and it is owned and operated by the National Highways Authority of India. This is Kerala's first-ever tunnel for road transport and South India's longest six-lane road tunnel. Construction of the tunnel started in 2016 and completed by December 2021.

Nitin Gadkari, the Minister of Road Transport and Highways announced the opening of one of the twin tube tunnels through the social platform Twitter. The second tunnel opened in January 2022.

== Present traffic ==
Kuthiran gradient is situated in the Kuthiran Hills, situated in the western part of Anaimalai Hills. The hills are part of Peechi-Vazhani Wildlife Sanctuary.

Kuthiran gradient was a major traffic bottleneck and an accident spot on the crowded Thrissur-Palakkad stretch of the 6 lane National Highway 544 (India) used by long distance traffic coming from Coimbatore, Salem, Chennai and Bengaluru. It was the missing link that was planned to be constructed when the Highway was designed.

The works on tunnel took more than a decade to complete due to geological and administrative challenges. The project was awarded in 2009 but the work on the tunnel only began in 2016.

On completion of works, both the tunnels reduced the distance between Kochi to Coimbatore by 3 kilometres (1.86 mi) but travel time got reduced by hours from the ease in traffic jams caused from heavy vehicles traversing through the hills.

In August 2018 during 2018 Kerala floods, the tunnel was opened for passage of emergency vehicles. In June 2019 the tunnel was opened for four hours following a Gridlock caused due to an accident at Kuthiran Bridge. In October 2020, a Gridlock happened after an accident causing long queues extending to kilometers on both sides, and traffic resumed only in the evening after temporarily opening the under construction tunnel.

On 31 December 2020, seven vehicles collided in an accident and 3 people died at Kuthiran causing a gridlock. These types of gridlocks used to happen regularly at this spot due to frequent accidents, and people who are aware of this used to prefer alternative longer routes just for the sake of a reliable journey time. An RTI query in 2019 revealed 235 people have died in this stretch due to accidents in the past 10 years.

In January 2020, the tunnel was partially opened to facilitate Power Grid Corporation of India's underground cabling works between Thrissur and Palakkad.

On July 31, 2021, one of the two tunnels in Palakkad - Thrissur direction was officially opened for traffic following an announcement made by Nitin Gadkari through Twitter.

== Cost ==
The Pragati group was subcontracted the work by the Hyderabad-based KMC company. Pragathi bagged the sub-contract at a cost of Rs 200 crore.

== Dimension ==
The 6 lane twin tube tunnels will have length of almost 1 kilometer, left tube 955 m (3,133 ft) and right tube 944 m (3,097 ft), while the width and height would be 14 and 10 metres (46 and 33 ft), respectively. The tunnels would be located in a gap of 20 metres (66 ft). There are two emergency crossovers inside the tunnel.

== Gallery ==
Time Lapse video of Kuthiran Tunnel

== See also ==
- Kozhikode–Wayanad Tunnel Road
