= National Highway 766 (India) =

National highway in India

National Highway 766
- Map of National Highway 766 in red

Route information
- Length: 272 km (169 mi)

Major junctions
- From: Kozhikode, Kerala
- To: Kollegal, Chamrajnagar District, Karnataka.

Location
- Country: India
- States: Karnataka: 155 km Kerala:117 km
- Primary destinations: Kozhikode- Thamarassery -Kalpetta -Sulthan Bathery- Gundlupet - Mysore - Kollegal

Highway system
- Roads in India; Expressways; National; State; Asian
← NH 66	→ NH 948

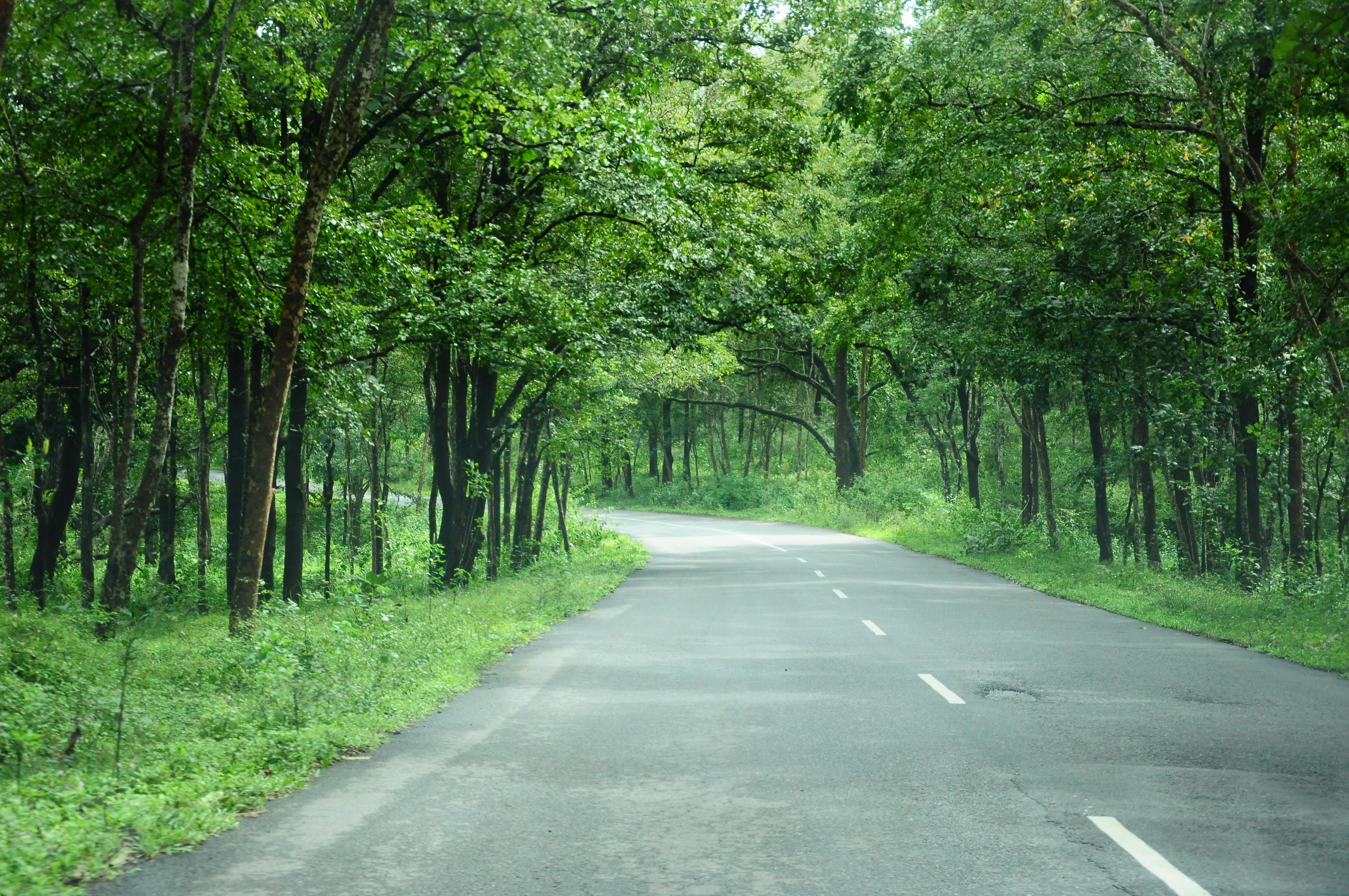
NH-766 through Bandipur forest in Karnataka

National Highway 766 (NH 766) (previously NH-212) is a National Highway in Southern India. NH 766 connects Kozhikode in Kerala with Kollegal in Karnataka via Mysore. Of the total distance of 272 km, 117 km is in Kerala and 155 is in Karnataka. At Kollegal, it joins NH 948, which connects Bengaluru and Coimbatore. The highway passes through dense forests of Western ghats of India. The NH-766 passes through 19.7 km Bandipur National Park and Wayanad wild life sanctuary. There is a Forest check post of Karnataka Aranya Elake at Moolehole on forest stretch of this highway to monitor and control vehicular traffic.

The section of the road from Vythiri (Lakkidi) in Wayanad to Thamarasserry (Adivaram) called as Thamarassery Churam (A hill highway with nine hairpin bends) offers a scenic drive. NHAI is considering Wayanad Tunnel as a bypass for Thamarassery Ghat in NH 766 and currently undertaking DPR studies for making Kunnamangalam to Kalpetta stretch realigning via SH 83. As Wayanad Tunnel is already a 4 lane road and have got all Environmental Clearances including Stage-II Forest Clearance, there is a high-demand to realign NH 766 via this route and make Kozhikode - Muthanga - Mysore road through Wayanad Tunnel.

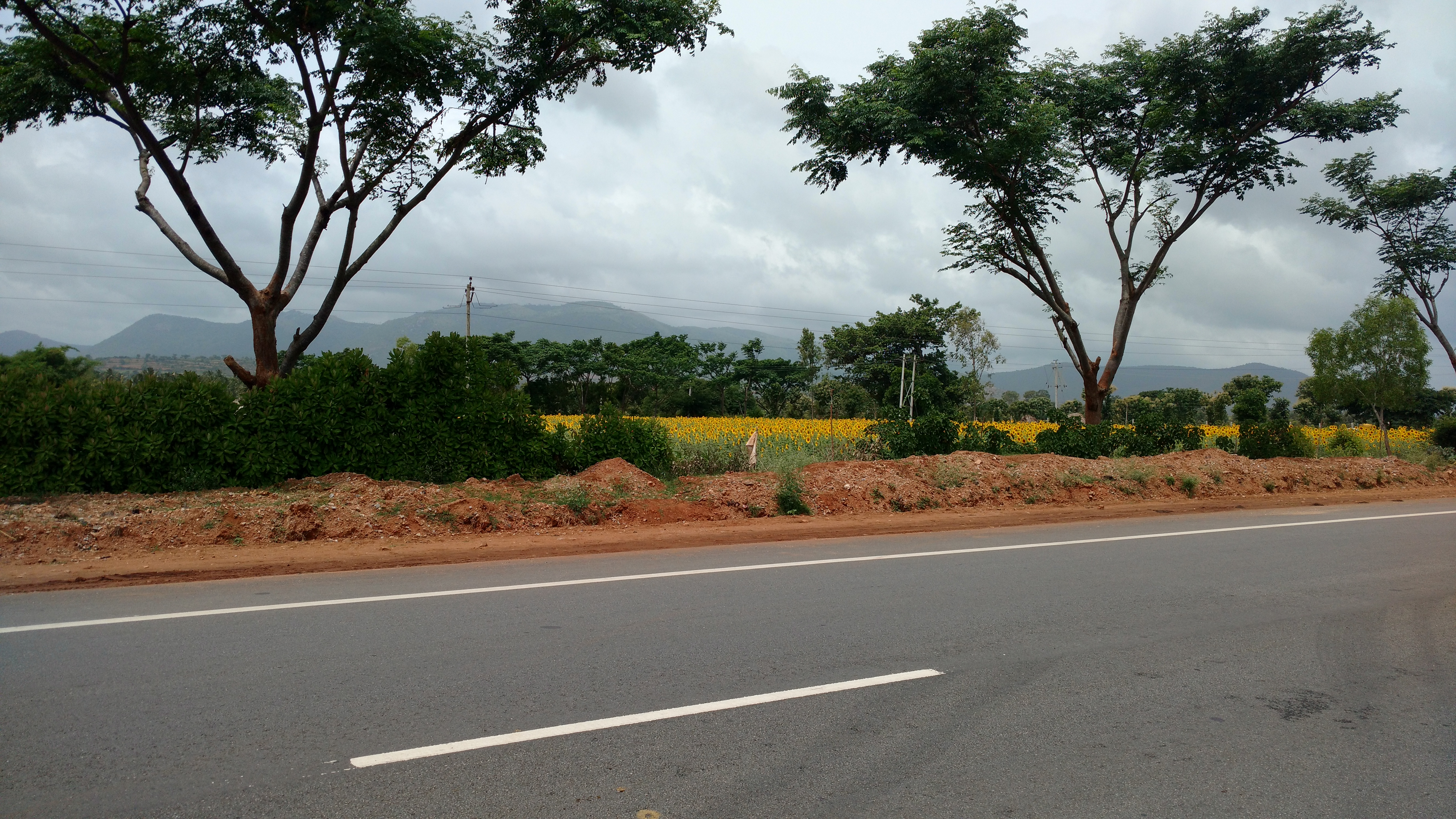
NH 766 view from Gundalpet to Wayanad

== Route ==
=== In Kerala ===
- Kozhikode
- Kunnamangalam
- Koduvally
- Thamarassery
- Vythiri
- Kalpetta
- Kakkavayal
- Meenangadi
- Sultan Bathery
- Muthanga

=== In Karnataka ===
- Gundlupete
- Begur
- Nanjangud
- Mysore
- T Narsipur
- Kollegal

== Night Traffic ban at Bandipura ==
The Karnataka government banned night traffic from 9 P.M. up to 6 A.M. through the road passing through Bandipur National Park as conservationists argued that it is disturbing the wildlife. It is closed for 2-wheelers from 6 P.M. to 6 A.M. The alternate road to use during night hours is from Kalpetta to Mysore via Mananthavady, Kutta, Gonikoppal, and Hunsur. This alternate route is much longer and completely bypasses Sulthan Bathery, Gundlupet and Nanjangud covering 352 kilometres (219 mi) distance.

== See also ==
- National Highways Development Project
- National Highway 181 (India)
- National Highway 948 (India)
- National Highway 150A (India)
