= Kattippara =

Kattippara Kattippara
- Town
- Location in Kerala, India Kattippara (India)
- Coordinates: 11°21′40″N 76°0′35″E
- Country: India
- State: Kerala
- District: Kozhikode

Government
  - Member of Parliament: M K Raghavan
  - MLA (Koduvally): MK Muneer
  - Panchayath President: Sajeena P

Area
  - Total: 21.29 km^{2} (8.22 sq mi)

Population (2001)
  - Total: 30,123
  - Density: 1,415/km^{2} (3,665/sq mi)

Languages
  - Official: Malayalam, English
- Time zone: UTC+5:30 (IST)
- PIN: 673573
- Sex ratio: 1000:1040 ♂/♀
- Literacy: 88%
- Lok Sabha constituency: Kozhikode
- Vidhan Sabha constituency: Koduvally
- Climate: pleasant (Köppen)

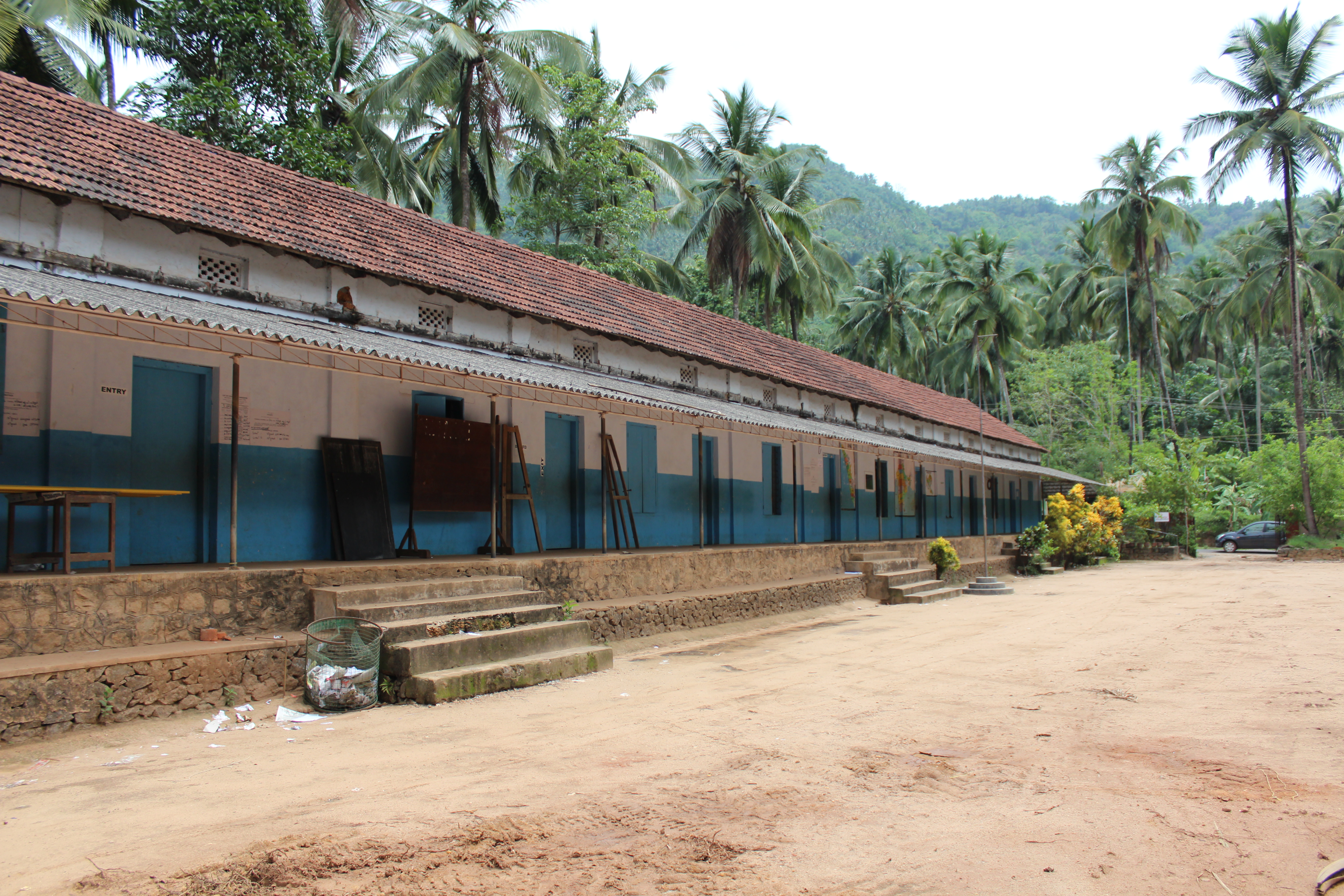
Nirmala U.P.School

Kattippara (Hard Rock in Malayalam) often called as Kattipara, is a Panchayat in Kozhikode district, Kerala. It is located about 10 km from Thamarassery town. It is a village with a lot of hilly areas. As the name indicates, it is famous for hard rocks which we can find everywhere in this village. The adjacent villages are Thalayad, Chamal, Kolikkal, Unnikulam, Puthupadi and Thamarassery.

== History ==
The name 'Kattipara' was formed from hard rocks which were used by the early occupants of this area and the people who came from other places for agriculture and other people.

The early occupants of Kattipara were tribals. then different migrants from different religions came in the 1940s they set up houses and started different agriculture.

== Economy ==
The major source of income in this village is agriculture. Majority of the population depend on the agriculture crops such as rubber, coconut, arecanut, ginger, pepper etc. A very minority only depend on business and government jobs. There are many self-help groups, small scale industries and a kudumba shree units active in this place. Other major sources of the people are products of agriculture, daily wagers, constructions and other businesses.

== Tourism ==
The major tourist places in this village are Kualamala and Amaradu Mala which are good for trekking and sightseeing. Wild animals like monkeys, deer, wild pigs, wild buffaloes and a large variety of insects and birds are found in the innermost forest area of both Kulamala and Amarad.

== Climate ==
Kattippara has a generally cool humid climate with a very hot season extending from March to May. The average annual rainfall is more than 3500 mm and it is the highest rain fall in this region.

== Demographics ==
Population consists of mainly Christian, Hindu and Muslim communities.

Nazareth LP School, Kattippara

== Educational institutions ==
Holy Family Higher Secondary School and Nazareth LP & U.P. School are the major educational institutions (are aided) in this village and students from nearby places also depend on these schools for their formal and secondary education. Other than these institutions there are preliminary schools, KGs and anganavadis.

== Government Institutions ==
The Kattipara Gram Panchayath is the major government institution in this locality which has Thamarassery, Poonor, Puthupadi and Thalayad as its borders. Other institutions include Kerala Gramin Bank, Kattipara Veterinary Hospital, Government Homeo Dispensory, Government Ayurveda Dispensory, Public Health Centre (PHC), Akshaya e kendra, branches of various banks, ATM, Bharat Petroleum pump etc.

== Transportation ==
Kattippara village connects to other parts of India through Calicut city on the west and Thamarassery town on the east. National highway No.66 passes through Kozhikode and the northern stretch connects to Mangalore, Goa and Mumbai. The southern stretch connects to Cochin and Trivandrum. The eastern National Highway No.54 going through Adivaram connects to Kalpetta, Mysore and Bangalore. The nearest airports are at Kannur and Kozhikode. The nearest railway station is at Kozhikode.
