= State Highway 83 (Kerala) =

Road in Kerala, India

State Highway 83
- Kunnamangalam - Wayanad Tunnel - Kalpetta Highway

Route information
- Existed: 2025–present

Location
- Country: India
- State: Kerala

Highway system
- Roads in India; Expressways; National; State; Asian; State Highways in Kerala

State Highway 83 (SH 83) is a state highway in Kerala, India that starts in Kunnamangalam, Kozhikode and ends in Kalpetta, Wayanad through Wayanad Tunnel.

SH 83 connects major towns Kunnamangalam - NIT/REC - Agastianmuzhi (Mukkam) - Thiruvambady - Anakkampoyil - Wayanad Tunnel - Meppadi - Kalpetta. The highway is 58.0 km long. The State Government of Kerala is constructing Wayanad Tunnel, an 8 km twin tube tunnel near Anakkampoyil - Meppadi in SH 83.

SH 83 starts and ends in NH 766. NHAI is considering Wayanad Tunnel as a bypass for Thamarassery Ghat in NH 766 and currently undertaking DPR studies for making Kunnamangalam to Kalpetta stretch realigning via SH 83. As Wayanad Tunnel is already a 4 lane road and have got all Environmental Clearances including Stage-II Forest Clearance, there is a high-demand to realign NH 766 via this route and make Kozhikode - Muthanga - Mysore road through Wayanad Tunnel.

== Route map ==
Kunnamangalam - NIT- Agastianmuzhi (Mukkam) - Thiruvambady - Pulloorampara - Anakkampoyil - Wayanad Tunnel - Kalladi - Meppadi - Kalpetta

Note that the section Anakkampoyil to Meppadi an 8 km twin tube Wayanad Tunnel is under construction by Kerala Government with agreement to Konkan Railway and Dilip Buildcon Ltd.
