= Begur, Gundlupet =

Begur is a small village in Gundlupet taluk of Chamarajanagar district of Karnataka state, India.

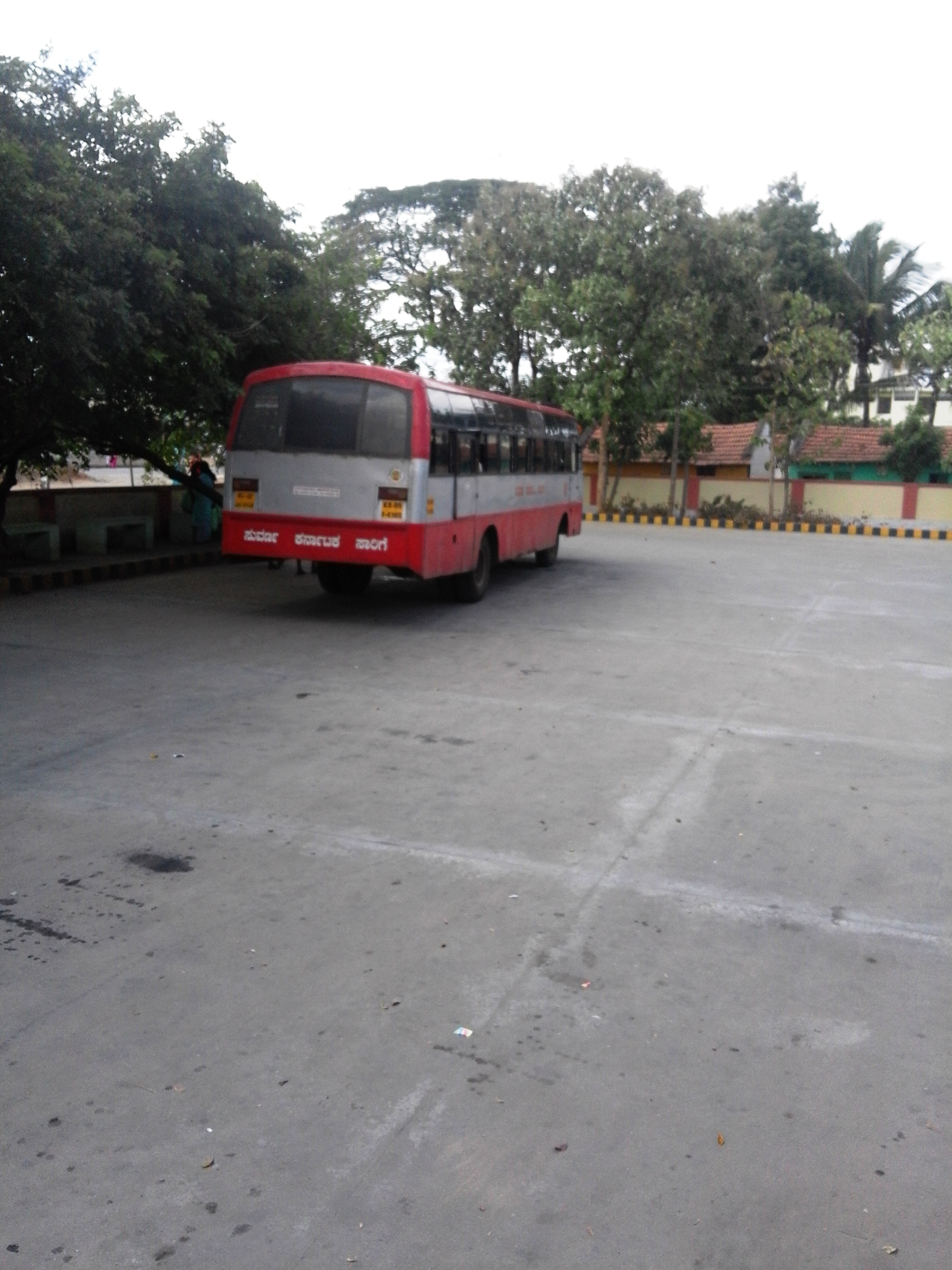
Begur bus station

== Location ==
Begur is located between Gundlupet and Nanjangud towns on the Ooty-Bangalore Road. Begur is 35 km from Chamarajanagar and 15 km from Gundlupet. There is a post office in Begur and the postal code is 571109.

== Agriculture ==
The main crops cultivated in Begur include food grains and commercial crops. Jowar and ragi are widely grown as staple food grains, suited to the semi-arid conditions of the area. Among commercial and cash crops, sugar cane, turmeric, onion, banana, cotton, and sunflower are predominant.

== Villages and suburbs ==
- Horeyala, 4 km
- Somahalli, 6 km
- Agathagowdanahalli, 7 km
- Kulagana, 9 km
- Nitre, 9 km

== Transportation ==
There is no railway station in Begur. The nearest railway station is Nanjangud.

== Highschool ==
- Gangadareswara Highschool
- Gowtham College, Bommalapura
- Little Flower Highschool, Begur
