= State Highway 7 (Kerala) =

Road in Kerala, India

State Highway 7
- SH 7 highlighted in red

Route information
- Maintained by Kerala Public Works Department
- Length: 32.8 km (20.4 mi)

Major junctions
- West end: SH 1 / SH 6 in Thiruvalla
- SH 9 / SH 10 in Kozhencherry; NH 183A in Pathanamthitta
- East end: SH 8 in Kumbazha

Location
- Country: India
- State: Kerala
- Districts: Pathanamthitta

Highway system
- Roads in India; Expressways; National; State; Asian; State Highways in Kerala
← SH 6	→ SH 8

The SH-07 / T.K.Road is the life line of the Central Travancore.

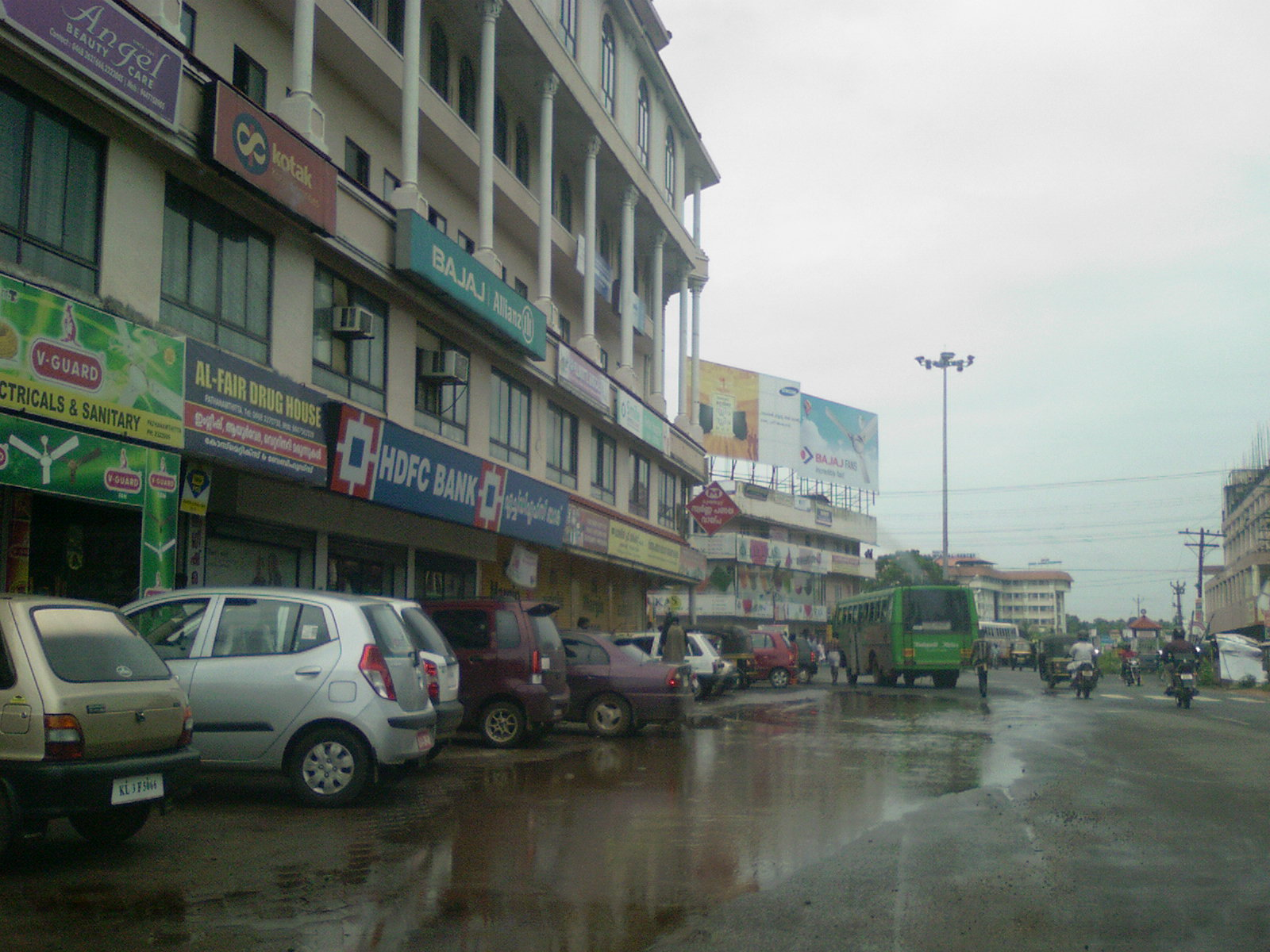
Pathanamthitta City is on The T.K.Road

It is also known as Thiruvalla-Pathanamthitta-Kumbazha Highway. This State Highway origins and ends within the Pathanamthitta District. It covers a total distance of 32.8 km.

It interconnects the townships of Thiruvalla, Kozhencherry and Pathanamthitta. It starts at SCS Junction, Thiruvalla (Main Central Road intersection) and ends at Kumbazha (Main Eastern Highway intersection). Till the 1990s, it was called Thiruvalla-Kozhencherry Road and ended at Kozhencherry (Poyanil Jn.). The first letters of Thiruvalla and Kumbazha forms the nomenclature of the road as T.K.Road

== Route description ==
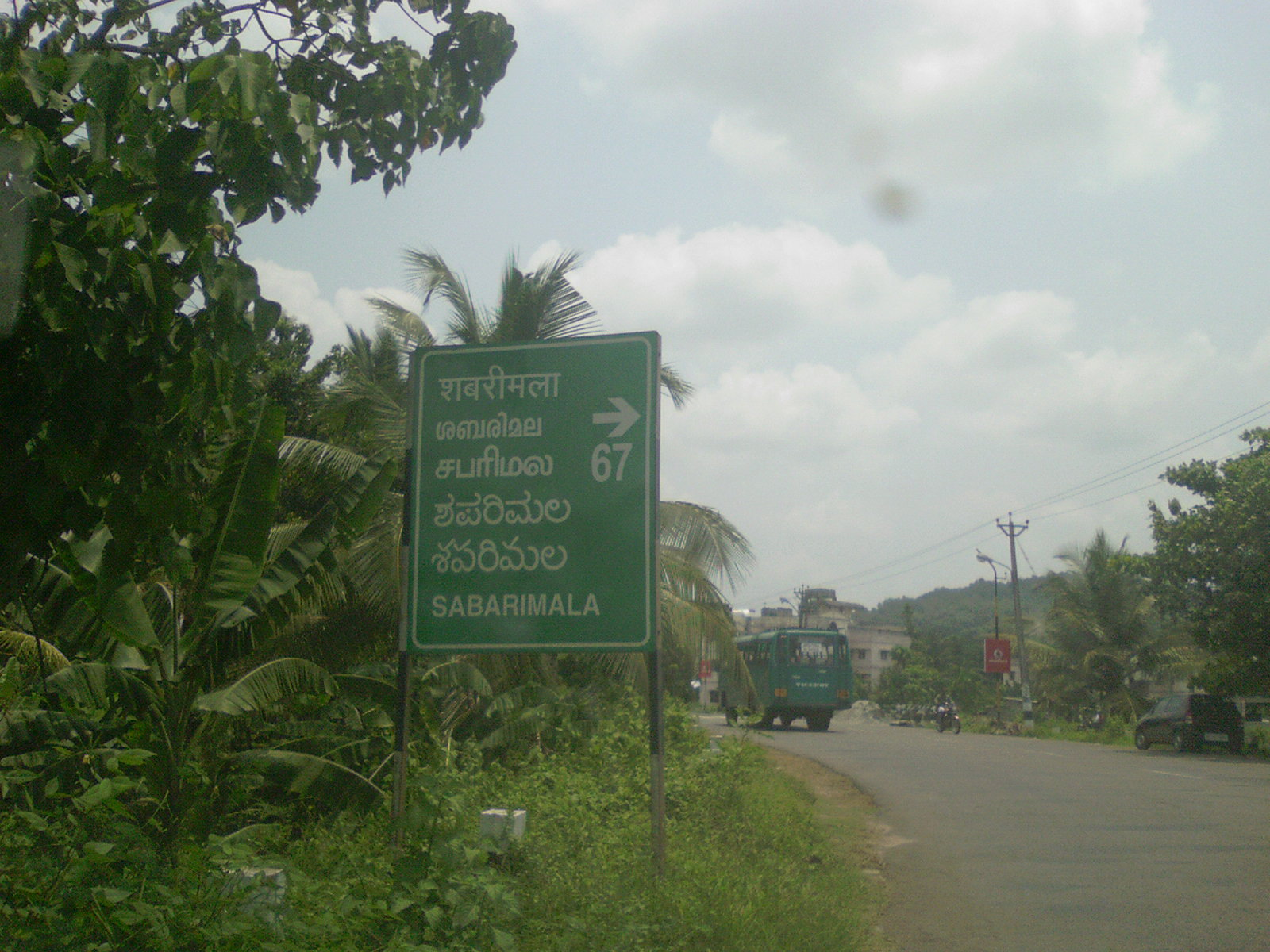
A sign-board that indicates the direction to Sabarimala. The multilingual board is written in English, Hindi, Malayalam, Tamil, Telugu and Kannad

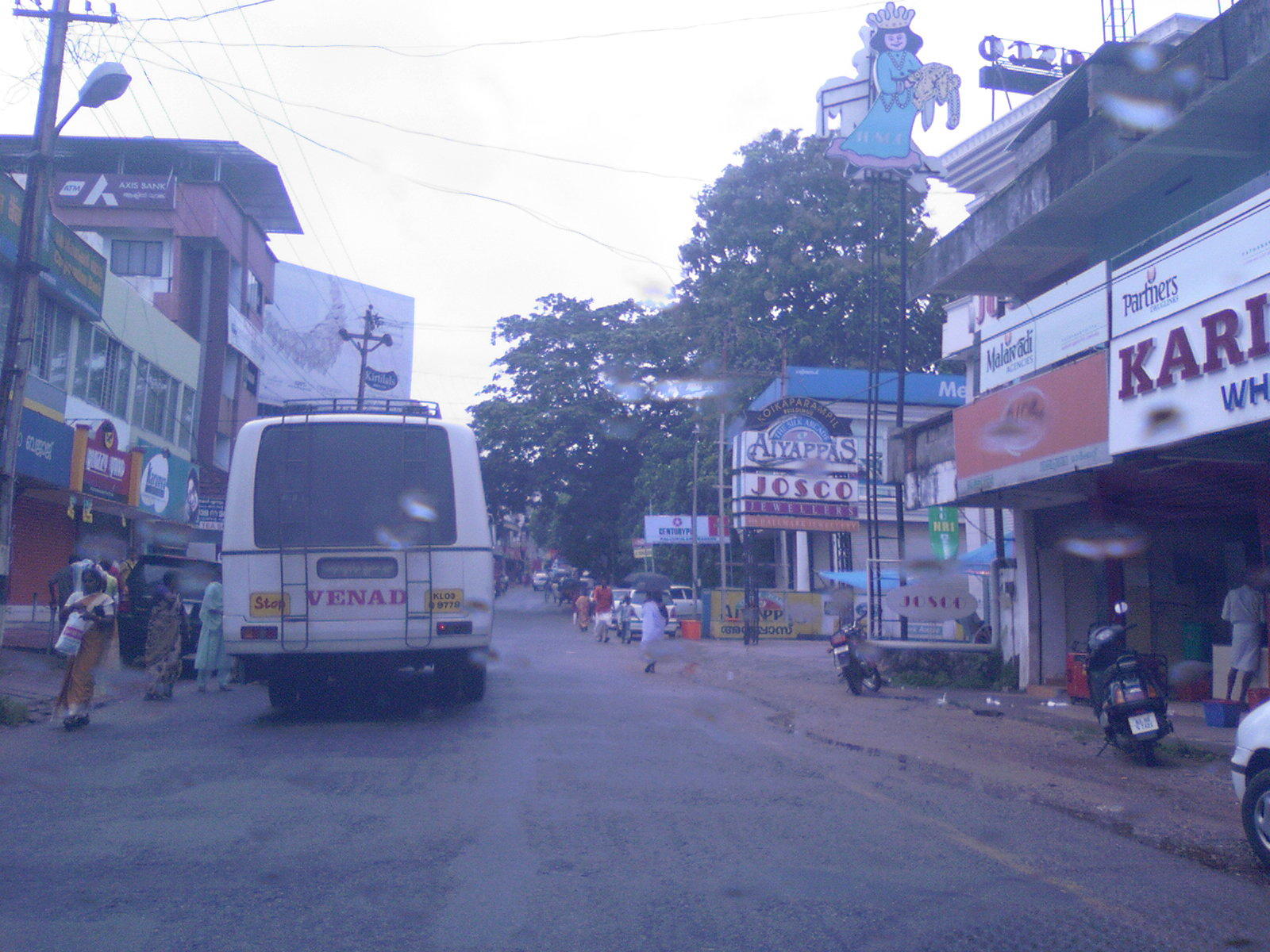
The General Hospital Road stretch of the T.K.Road

SCS junction, Thiruvalla - Manjadi - Meenthalakara - Kattode - Thottabagom - Vallamkulam Bridge - Nellad - Eraviperoor junction - Kumbanad Pullad (Kottayam - Kozhencherry Highway -SH09- joins - Chettimukku - Nedumbrayar - Maramon - Kozhencherry - Thekkemala junction - Nellikala - Elanthur - Pathanamthitta - Kumbazha junction (joins Main Eastern Highway / SH08)

The T.K.Road connects M.C.Road(S.H.-01) to Main Eastern Highway (S.H.-08). The T.K.Road (S.H.-07) has the richest townships en route. It can also be called as "the N.R.I. Highway of Kerala". Not only the main townships of Thiruvalla and Pathanamthitta, but all the small towns and villages through which T.K.Road passes through are major contributors towards India's Foreign Currency. The diaspora is spread across the world, mainly U.S., Middle East and Europe. The Highway also has great cultural significance too. The main trunk road to Sabarimala, Kerala's Largest Pilgrim Centre starts from Pathanamthitta. The annual Christian convention at Maramon is held near Kozhencherry which is on T.K.Road. The traditional Snake Boat race conducted during Onam celebration is at Aranmula which lies near to T.K.Road / S.H.-07. The District Headquarters, Pathanamthitta is connected to Cochin and Northern Kerala by T.K.Road. It connects the South Eastern townships of Kerala to M.C.Road. It is the shortest route to Cochin from Punalur, (the hill town of Kollam District) and in turn from the Tamil Nadu townships Tenkasi and Tirunelveli.

Though T.K.Road / S.H.-07 passes only through the Pathanamthitta District, it connects the district to the neighbouring districts of Kottayam, Alappuzha and Ernakulam. It also connects the Alappuzha and Kottayam districts to the eastern parts of Kollam district

== Townships on the T.K. Road / S.H.-07 ==
- Thiruvalla
- Manjadi Junction
- Meenthalakara
- Kattode
- Thottabhagam
- Vallamkulam
- Nellad
- Eraviperoor
- Kumbanad
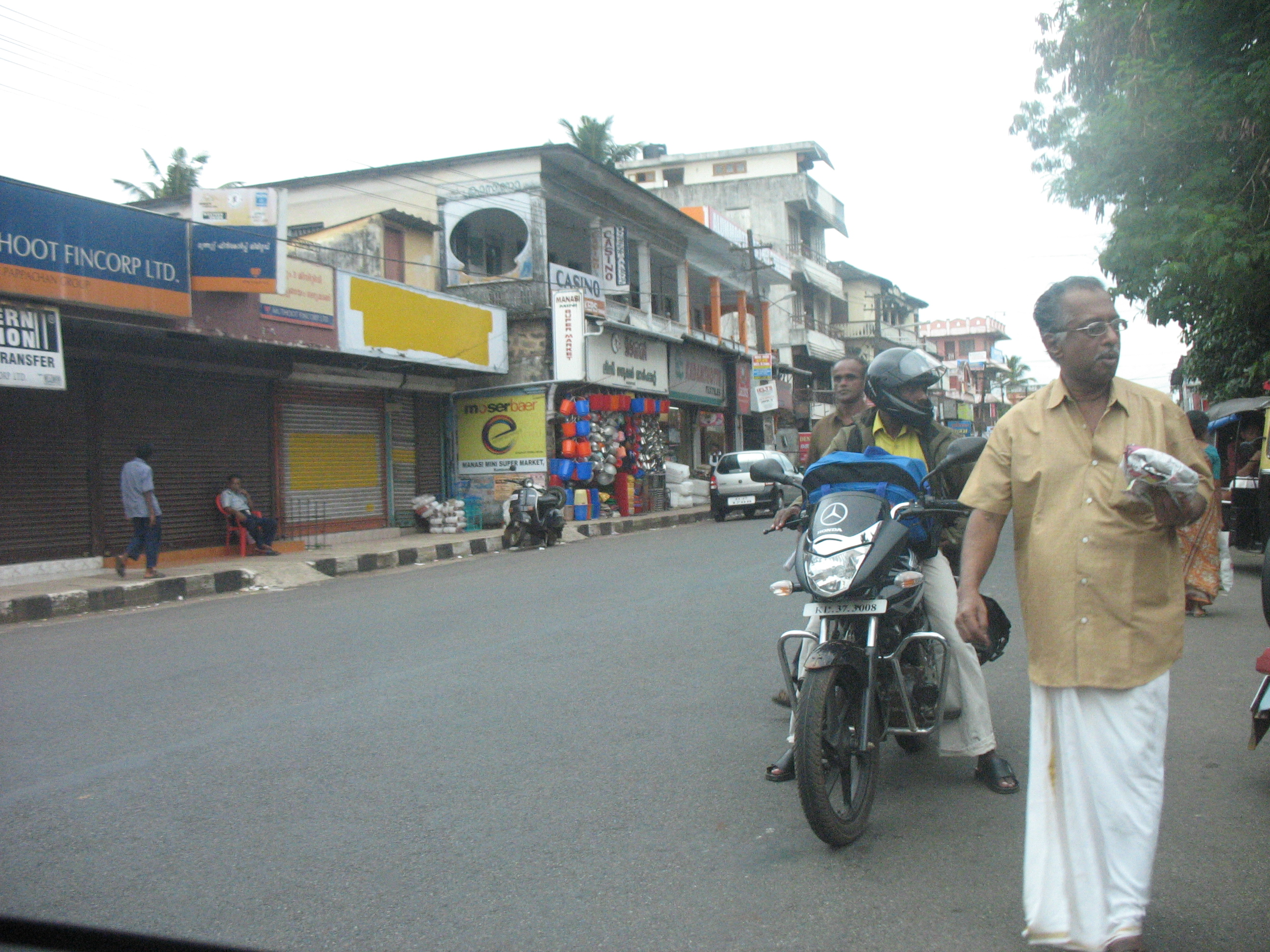
  Kumbanad Stretch
- Pullad
- Maramon
- Kozhencherry
- Thekkemala Jn.
- Karamveli
- Nellikkala
- Elanthur
- Varyapuram
- Pathanamthitta Town
- Kumbazha Jn. - Pathanamthitta

== See also ==
- Pathanamthitta
- Roads in Kerala
- List of state highways in Kerala
