= State Highway 6 (Kerala) =

Kayamkulam city to thiruvalla city RD

State Highway 6
- SH 6 highlighted in red

Route information
- Maintained by Kerala Public Works Department
- Length: 30.8 km (19.1 mi)

Major junctions
- South end: NH 66 in Kayamkulam
- SH 10 in Mavelikkara; SH 12 near Thiruvalla
- North end: SH 7 / SH 1 in Thiruvalla

Location
- Country: India
- State: Kerala
- Districts: Alappuzha, Pathanamthitta

Highway system
- Roads in India; Expressways; National; State; Asian; State Highways in Kerala
← SH 5	→ SH 7

State Highway 6 (SH 6) is a state highway in Kerala, India that starts in Kayamkulam and ends in Thiruvalla. The highway is 30.8 kilometres (19.1 mi) long.(NH66 to MC road)

== Route description ==
Kayamkulam Town - Chettikulangara Devi Temple - Mavelikkara junction - Chennithala - Mannar - Parumala - Travancore Sugars & Chemicals - Manipuzha bridge - Thiruvalla Town (joining (SH - 07))

== See also ==
- Roads in Kerala
- List of state highways in Kerala
