= Thiruvalla Bypass =

Bypass road in Kerala State

Thiruvalla Bypass Road is a 2.3 kilometre long bypass road built by Kerala State Transport Project that begins at Mazhuvangad and ends at Ramanchira (both on MC Road), bypassing the centre of the town of Thiruvalla in Pathanamthitta district of Kerala, India. Though the road is called a bypass, it has more signals and junctions than the main road that is supposed to bypass, causing the increase in the network or roads, not saving time spent on signals. Vehicles that enter this road assume it to be a bypass causing dangers due to the crossroads on it. The road was thrown open to public on 14 February 2021. The bypass has a 220-metre-long flyover above the Thiruvalla-Kumbazha Road at the YMCA junction. The road also links Thiruvalla-Mallappally Road with the MC Road at Ramanchira. The cost of the project is ₹37.5 crore.

The work on the ₹33-crore bypass project was formally launched by former Chief Minister Oommen Chandy in December 2014, fixing October 2016 as the deadline for its completion. However, the project had got into legal wrangles over land acquisition. This, coupled with the abandoning of the work midway by the contractor two years ago, badly affected the project.
