= Konni, Kerala =

Konni
- Town
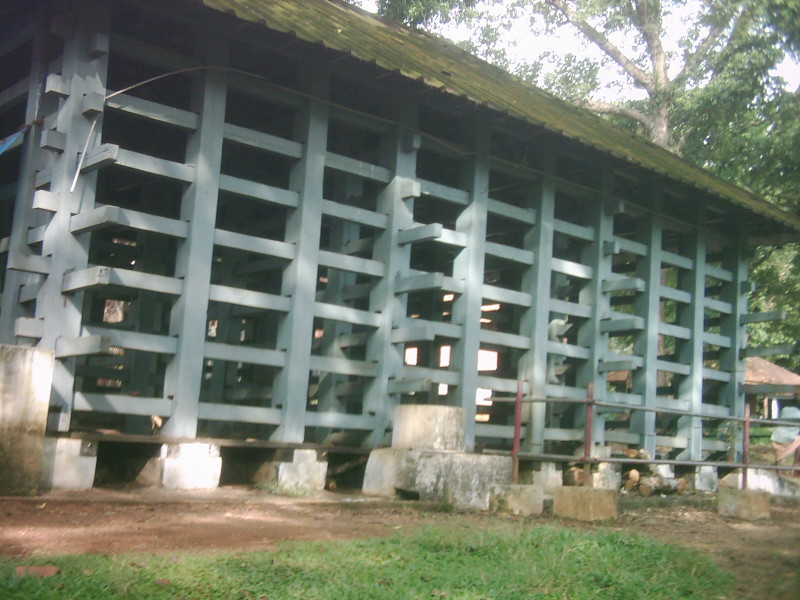
- Konni elephant cage

- Location within Kerala Location within India
- Coordinates: 9°13′36.34″N 76°50′57.77″E
- Country: India
- State: Kerala
- District: Pathanamthitta
- Named for: Konni elephant cage

Government
  - Type: Taluk

Area
  - Total: 41.45 km^{2} (16.00 sq mi)

Population (2011)
  - Total: 30,299
  - Density: 731.0/km^{2} (1,893/sq mi)

Languages
  - Official: Malayalam, English
- Time zone: UTC+5:30 (IST)
- Postal code: 689691
- Telephone code: 0468
- Vehicle registration: KL-83
- Nearest city: Pathanamthitta (10 km)
- Lok Sabha constituency: Pathanamthitta
- Assembly constituency: Konni
- Literacy: 94.55%
- Website: Official website

Konni is major town and grama panchayat and taluk headquarters in Pathanamthitta district of Kerala, India. Konni is known for its elephant cages, forests, and rubber plantations. It is also known as "Aana koodinte Nadu". Konni is located 10 km (6.2 mi) south east of district headquarters Pathanamthitta and 34 km (21 mi) away from Chengannur railway station. It is well-connected via the Muvattupuzha - Punalur state highway. The Government Medical College, Konni allotted to Pathanamthitta district is situated 5 km (3.1 mi) east of this town.

== Overview ==
Konni is an important town on the Main Eastern Highway (SH 08). Konni is about 10 km (6.2 mi) away from the district headquarters. Konni assembly constituency is part of Pathanamthitta (Lok Sabha constituency).

The lush green land has been prominent as a haven of wild elephants and as an elephant training center. The large area of thick forest with wild animals made Konni to emerge as another tourist spot for safaris and trekking. In Kerala there are two elephant training centers, the other located at Kodanad. It is located in the Adoor revenue division and it is one of the major towns situated near it. Most Tamil workers in Kerala are in Konni.

== Transport ==
The nearest Main Railway station is Chengannur Railway Station 34 km (21 mi) and Punalur.The nearest airport is Thiruvananthapuram International Airport, about 99 km (62 mi) from Konni-Pathanamthitta. The Cochin International Airport is around 124 km (77 mi) from Konni. The Main Eastern Highway ( Punalur-Pathanamthitta-Pala-Muvattupuzha Road / SH – 08 ) connects the town to other major towns. Konni is 10 km (6.2 mi) from Pathanamthitta and 28 km (17 mi) from Punalur both of which are in the same route. Konni-Kalleli-Achankovil Road- This is a new road built by PWD that provides easy access to Tamil Nadu (Tenkasi) via Achankovil. This is a part of Chittar-Achankovil Road Project. This route reduces the distance between Sabarimala to Tenkasi by about 21 km (13 mi). Konni to Achankovil is 39 km (24 mi). Konni-Chandanapally Road—This road connects Konni to the major and main cities and towns of the districts like Adoor and Pandalam and Tiruvalla. Konni-Vazhamuttom-Vallicode-Chandanapally-Kodumon-Adoor—24 kilometres Konni-Vallicode-Kaippattoor-Thumpamon-Pandalam—22 kilometres. Konni-Thannithode-Chittar Road—This is an alternate route to Sabarimala.
The nearest Bus station is located at Konni, Pathanamthitta,- (S-H-80) konni-haripad r-d going major junctions poonkavu-mallasery -vallicode- kaipattoor -pandalam-mavelikkara - haripad -distance (54 km)

== Elephant Training Center ==
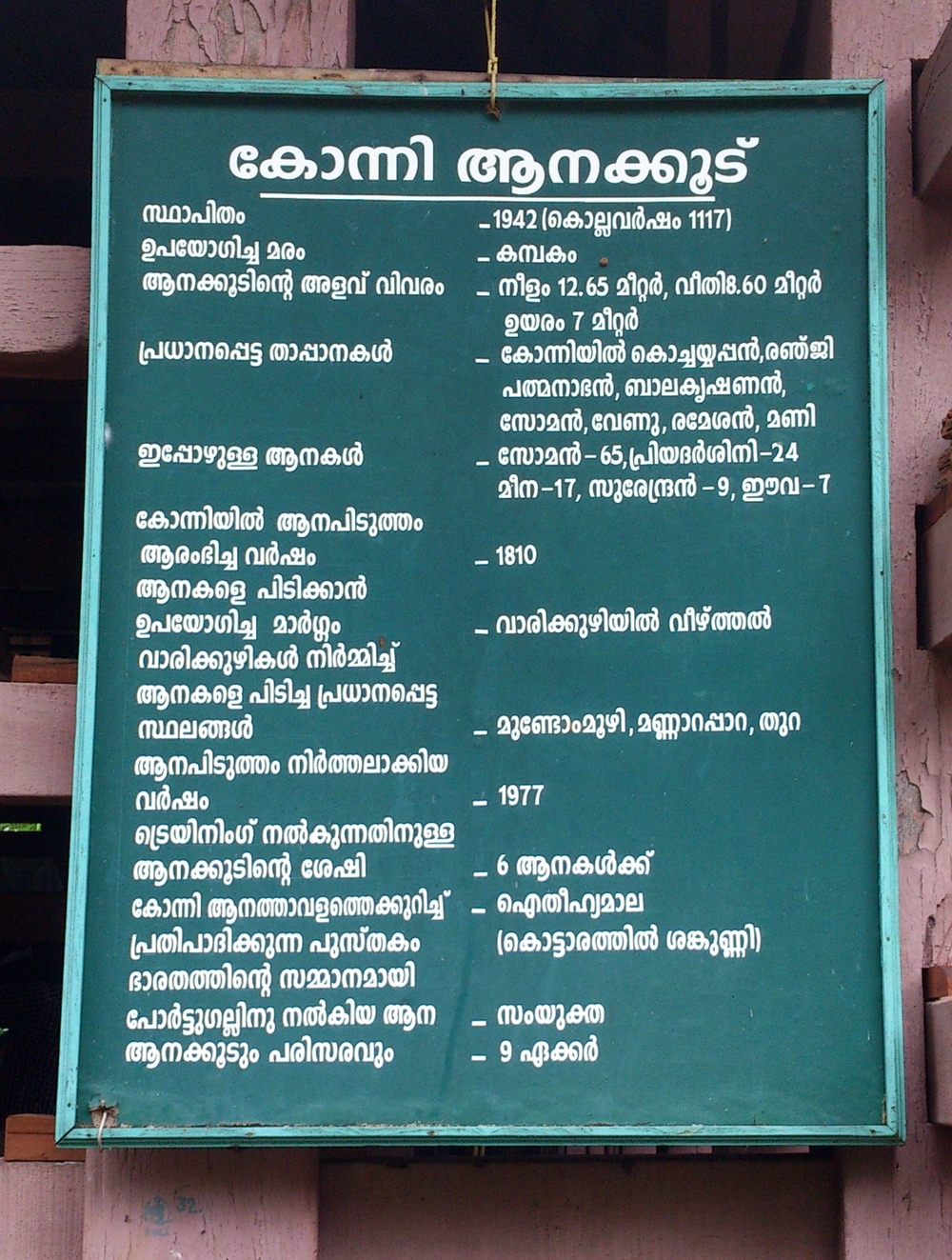
Konni Elephant Cage details board on display

Konni has a major elephant training centre, located 11 km (6.8 mi) from Pathanamthitta. The prime attraction here are the huge cages of wood built to house elephants. These cages are locally known as Aanakoodu and can accommodate three to four elephants at a time. The trainers here train the baby elephants which get separated from their herd, or are found wounded or roaming in the forest. Experienced trainers using their systematic training methods, tame the baby elephants. Visitors can get a close look at these elephants and can observe and understand a lot about their behaviour, especially that of baby elephants, which are often endearingly mischievous.

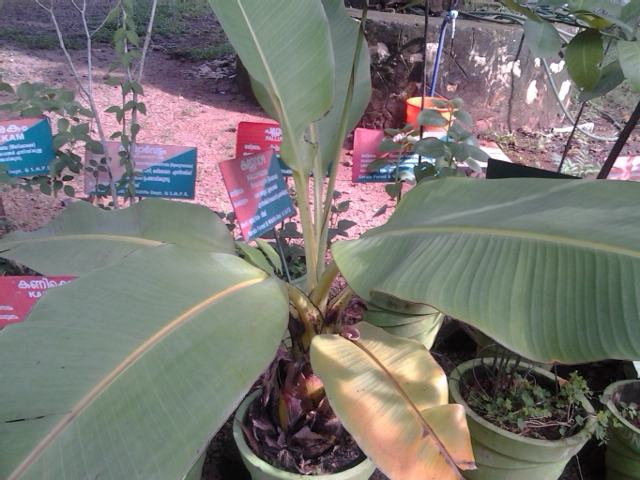
A herbal banana plantain grown in Konni Elephant Cage

Konni is known for the elephant training centre since ancient times. The elephants were captured from the dense forests of the western ghats/Sahyadri and brought to the elephant training cage at Konni. There these wild elephants are tamed and trained by mahouts specialized as elephant trainers. These trainers take the help of other tamed elephants.

The tamed elephants which render help to the trainers of the wild ones are: Konniyil Kochchayyappan, Ranji Padmanabhan, Balakrishnan, Soman, Venu, Rameshan, and Mani. Monday is a holiday for the training centre.

== Elephants in Konni ==
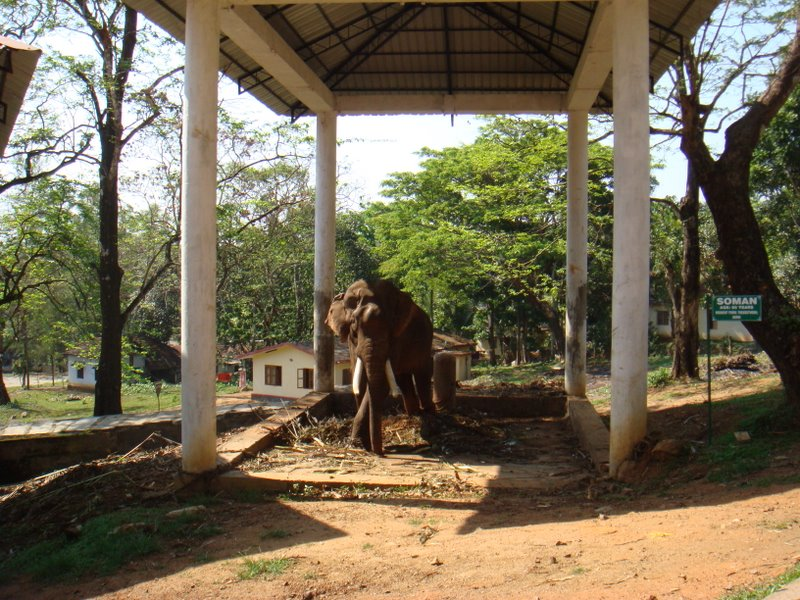
The elephant Soman

The present members of Konni elephant training center are Priyadarshini, Meena, Eva, Krishna, Neelakandan and Junior Surendran ( Manikandan) in which Junior Surendran is the youngest who is only three months old.

== History of Elephant training ==
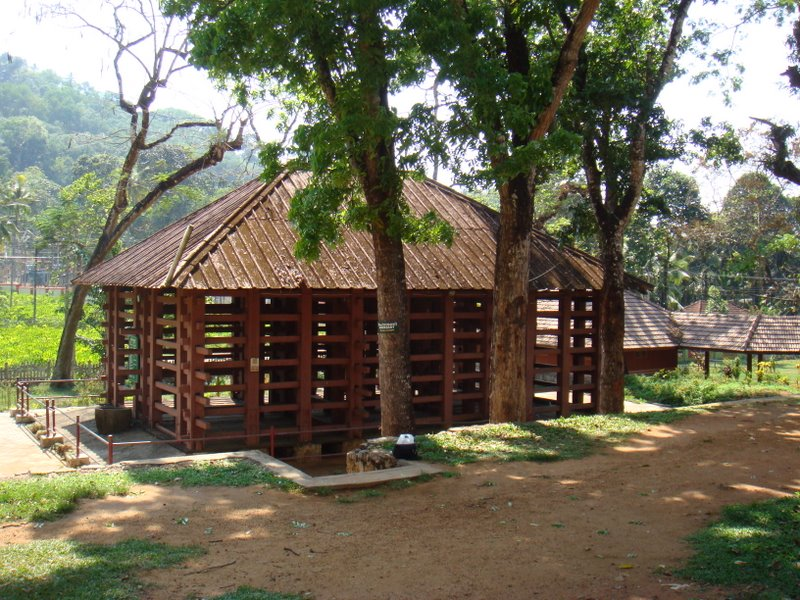
The Old Training Cage

The elephant capturing at Konni traces back to 1810 AD. The major elephant capturing locations include Mundom moozhy, Mannarappara and Thura. The elephant training cage which is present now was built in 1942. The wood of "Kambakam" was used for this. The present training cage has the capacity to train 6 elephants. The dimensions of the training cage are 12.65 by 8.60 by 7 metres (41.5 ft × 28.2 ft × 23.0 ft). The elephant training cage and its premises comprises 9 acres (36,000 m^{2}) of land.

The elephant capturing was officially stopped in 1977 by Govt: Circular though it was actually stopped many years prior to that.

Presently the elephant training cage is a major tourist attraction. It houses a history museum as well. The elephant training centre functions as an elephant welfare centre. The elephant calves estranged from the herd and found lost in the forest are brought there and are provided with medical facilities and proper care.

The details of Konni Elephant Training Centre and Training Cage are mentioned in the articles of the famous "Aithihyamaala" by Shri Kottarathil Shankunni. "Aithihyamaala" is referred as one of rare collection of articles of Kerala History.

== Gift to Portugal ==
Konni Elephant Training Centre has to its credit of gifting the Elephant "Samyuktha" to the Republic of Portugal as a mark of friendship and co-operation with the Republic of India.

How to reach: Konni is on the Main Eastern Highway (Punalur-Pathanamthitta-Muvattupuzha Highway/SH-08) and is connected to major towns and cities of Kerala through Pathanamthitta.

== Konni Forest Division ==
The Konni Forest Division is the first reserve forest in Kerala as declared on 9 October 1888, per the Travancore Forest Act of 1887. The division consists of eight stations spread across three ranges.

Konni range

- North Kumaramperoor Station
- South Kumaramperoor Station

Naduvathumoozhy range

- Kokkathode Station
- Karippanthode Station
- Padom

Mannarapara range

- Chempala Station
- Mannarapara Station

== Other tourist attractions ==
- Achankovil River

Konni features a long stretch of the Achankovil River which joins Pamba. This river is known for its lush green banks. It has several tributaries in this region.

- Muringamnagalam Sreemahadevar Temple

This temple is more than 1000 years old and is located nearly half a kilometre from Konni Junction. It used to belong to the Pandalam Royal Family. It is the biggest temple in east of Pathanamthitta district and biggest Siva temple in Pathanamthitta.

- Shri Kalleli Oorali Appooppankaavu, Konni, Pathanamthitta

Kalleli Oorali Appooppan rules over a pantheon of 999 hill deities. At the sacred grove inside Konny reserve forest he is awakened through kumbha pattu, a ritual art form that dates back to ancient times. Bamboos and stones come together to make their mysterious music, a wild tribal rhythm that resonates in the primeval stillness of the night. "Kalleli Kavu is the only place of worship where this art is still performed," says P V Shantakumar, temple committee president.

A ritual that springs from an age-old agrarian culture, kumbha pattu involves the rendering of songs to the accompaniment of indigenous instruments. "The kumbham is nothing but a bamboo stick shaped according to some specifications.

Then there are farm implements like iron sickles, dried arcanut leaves and tree skins. In the beginning they used to sit around bonfire and sing the praises of Oorali Appooppan," he says. Smooth, pumpkin-shaped boulders are picked from the nearby river for kumbha pattu. "They make a very distinctive sound when tapped with the dry bamboo piece. In the silence of the night it will instantly draw your attention," he adds.

The ritual pays reverence to all five elements, its lyrics stemming from the wild ecology that surrounds the temple. The song is basically a plea for protection from all evil and unknown energies.

"Settlers who were scared of animal attacks and other threats of the wild used to invoke Oorali Appoppan, their guardian deity, through the ritual. It’s believed that Kumbha pattu will erase all fears from your mind, refreshing your heart and spirit," he says.

Kalleli kavu is a place that celebrates the Dravidian culture and its practices are totally different from the regular tantric procedures.

"We don’t follow the vedic style of pooja. Padayanai, pongala, mudiyattam and azhi pooja are the major rituals. Grilled tubers are distributed as offering along with porridge made of bamboo rice. We follow the ancient customs and rituals only.

There are no dance or music programmes even during the festival days," he says. Kumbha pattu is conducted on all auspicious occasions and usually it starts in the evening, continuing until the early hours of the dawn. "In the song everything from the birth of the deity to the purpose of his incarnation are explained. Now we are conducting a 10-day ritual that started on the day of Vishu," he says.

Passed down orally to generations, the kumbha song contains many obsolete names and terms. You will come across erstwhile geographic areas like Malanad and Thulunad," he says. Practised by a particular caste, usually an elderly member of the community leads the ritual with other singers.

"And it’s Kokkathod Gopalan Asan who heads the team now. I think kumbha pattu is one among the toughest ritual songs as it’s not easy learning centuries-old tribal slang. It takes a lot of time and dedication to master the art," he adds.

- Achankovil and Aluvamkudi are two ancient temples located here.
- Kattathipara in Kokkathodu is a nearby tourist destination located a few kilometres away from Konni. Kattathipara is particularly attractive with its gigantic rocks and the triple-echo phenomenon.
- India Pentecostal Church of God is a biggest congregation of Pentecostal Christians in Konni.
- Kumbhavuruthy is a waterfall amidst thick forest
- Adavi Eco Tourisum Kutta Vanchi sailing is the main attraction here. about 7 km (4.3 mi) from Konni Town.

== Notable people ==
- Rajeev Sivshankar (born 1967), writer and novelist
- Renil Mammen Biju - India Book of Records & Asia Book of Records Holder
