= Muringamangalam Sreemahadevar Temple =

Temple
- Muringamangalam Sreemahadevar Temple, Konni, Pathanamthitta, Kerala

Religion
- Affiliation: Hinduism
- District: Pathanamthitta
- Deity: Mahadeva
- Festival: Maha Shivaratri

Location
- Location: Konni
- State: Kerala
- Country: India
- Interactive map of Temple
- Coordinates: 9.232995°N 76.854455°E

Architecture
- Type: Architecture of Kerala

Specifications
- Temple: One
- Elevation: 51.55 m (169 ft)

The Muringamangalam Sreemahadevar Temple, located half a kilometre from Konni Junction, is more than 1000 years old. It used to belong to the Pandalam Royal Family. It is the biggest temple east of Pathanamthitta and the biggest Siva temple in Pathanamthitta District. This temple is in the State of Kerala in the peninsular India. The main deity is Lord Shiva, facing east. Lords Ganapathi, Ayyappa, Nagas and Krishna are installed here. The temple of Lord Krishna is a recent addition, as it was after his presence was found in 'Devaprasnam', due to continuous Bhagavatha Sapthaham.
