= Vallamkulam =

- town
- Location in Kerala, India Vallamkulam (India)
- Coordinates: 9°22′58″N 76°37′16″E
- Country: India
- State: Kerala
- District: Pathanamthitta

Languages
  - Official: Malayalam, English
- Time zone: UTC+5:30 (IST)
- PIN: 689541

Vallamkulam is a small town located in Tiruvalla Taluk of Pathanamthitta district, Kerala state, India. The village is located 6 km from Tiruvalla town, on state highway 7.

== Location ==
The T.K. Road (Tiruvalla-Pathanamthitta-Kumbazha Road/SH-07) connects the town to other major towns, and here the Vallamkulam Bridge carries that road over the Manimala river. The place is within 5 km of Tiruvalla, and lies on the shores of the Manimala River (Manimalayar) in Eraviperoor Panchayat.

== Administration ==
Vallamkulam presently belongs to Aranmula state constituency and the Pathanamthitta Parliament seat.

== Schools ==
Vallamkulam also has a good educational background as this small place includes a good number of L.P. and U.P. schools and a high school called National High School Vallamkulam located in Nannoor, just 2 km away.

== Facilities ==
A number of good hospitals and dispensaries are available here which offer modern medical treatments alongside ayurvedic and homeopathic branches. The Karthika Nair Memorial N S S Ayurveda Hospital is in the town itself which provides all kinds of ayurvedic treatments. Karthika Nair Rehabilitation center for the disabled, located in Nannoor, is another establishment in the village.

== Economy ==
Like most parts of the district, the village relies mostly on the income generated by the large expatriate community working in the Middle East and other countries around the globe. Vallamkulam has a significant influence on the development and rise of the Malayalam printing and publishing world for being the home to the Kandathil family of Malayala Manorama Daily.

== Temples ==
Nannoor Devi Temple, Theloormala Kali Temple, Puthankauvmala Shiva Temple, Thiruvamanapuram Temple, Kunnathettu Kudumba temple, Kurumala Kavu and St. Mary's Orthodox Church are the major religious attractions of Vallamkulam.

== Churches ==
- India Pentecostal Church of God
- Assemblies of God in India
- The Pentecostal Mission
- St. George Knanaya church

== Notable persons ==
Vallamkulam is home to many notable people. Jacob Kizhakethil Alex is originally from Vallumkulam until 2007, where he moved to Australia and The vizhalil family who contributed to the development of this village.
