= Nannoor =

Village in Pathanamthitta District, Kerala, India

Nannoor is a place near Vallamkulam in Thiruvalla Taluk Pathanamthitta district, Kerala state, India. The name Nannoor derived from Nalla-ooru which means 'good place' in English. Nannoor Devi Temple and Puthen kavu mala Temple, Karthika Nair Memorial Building, National High School etc. are in Nannoor. The place have a number of schools and hospitals.
