= Main Eastern Highway =

Highway in Kerala, India

State Highway 8
- SH 8 highlighted in red

Route information
- Maintained by Kerala Public Works Department
- Length: 153.6 km (95.4 mi)

Major junctions
- South end: NH 744 in Punalur
- SH 5 in Pathanapuram; SH 7 in Kumbazha; NH 183A near Pathanamthitta; NH 183 in Ponkunnam; SH 32 in Pala; SH 42 in Karimkunnam; SH 40 / SH 44 / SH 33 in Thodupuzha
- North end: SH 1 in Muvattupuzha

Location
- Country: India
- State: Kerala
- Districts: Kollam, Pathanamthitta, Kottayam, Idukki, Ernakulam

Highway system
- Roads in India; Expressways; National; State; Asian; State Highways in Kerala
← SH 7	→ SH 9

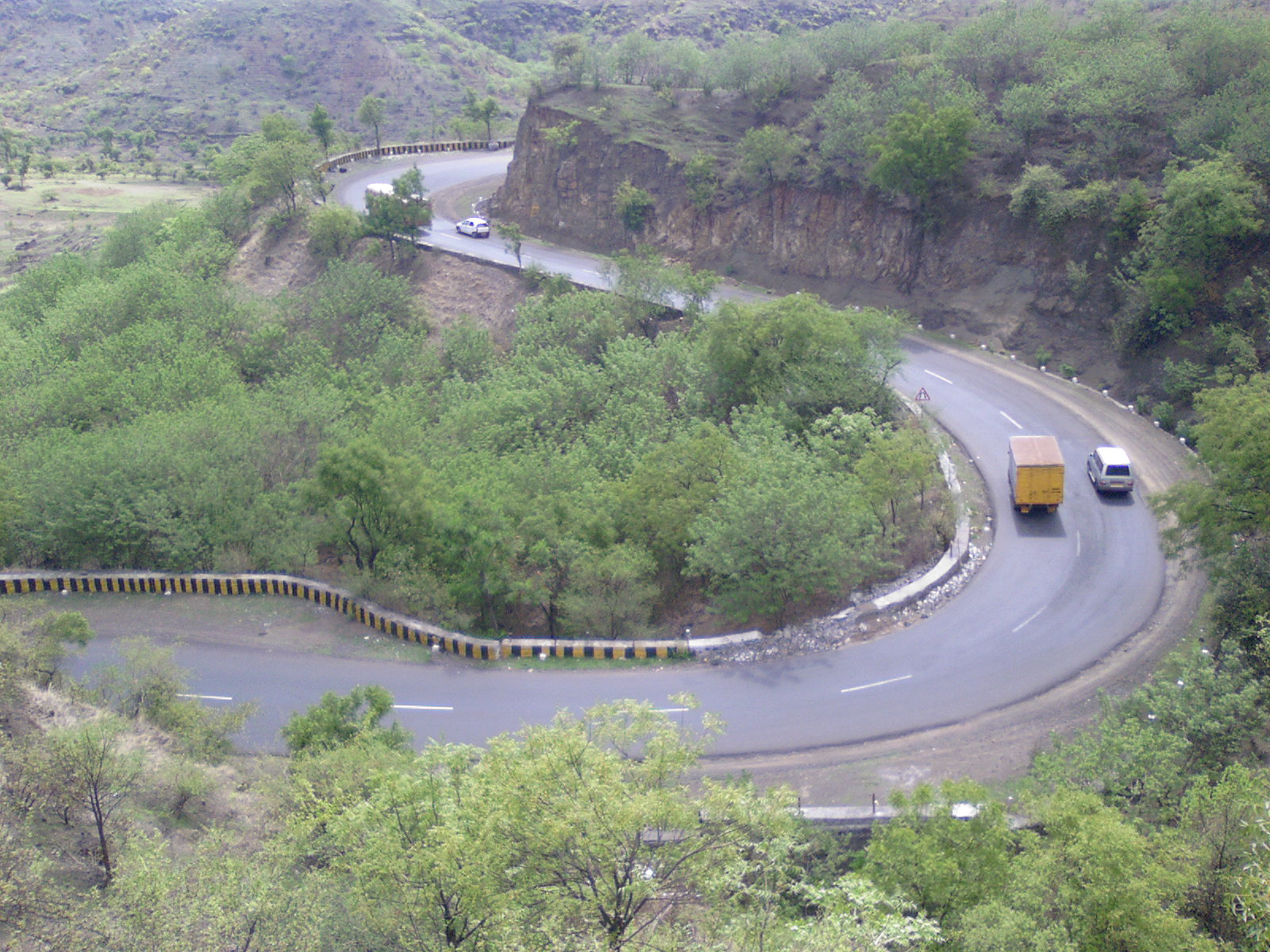
Ghat section of The Main Eastern Highway

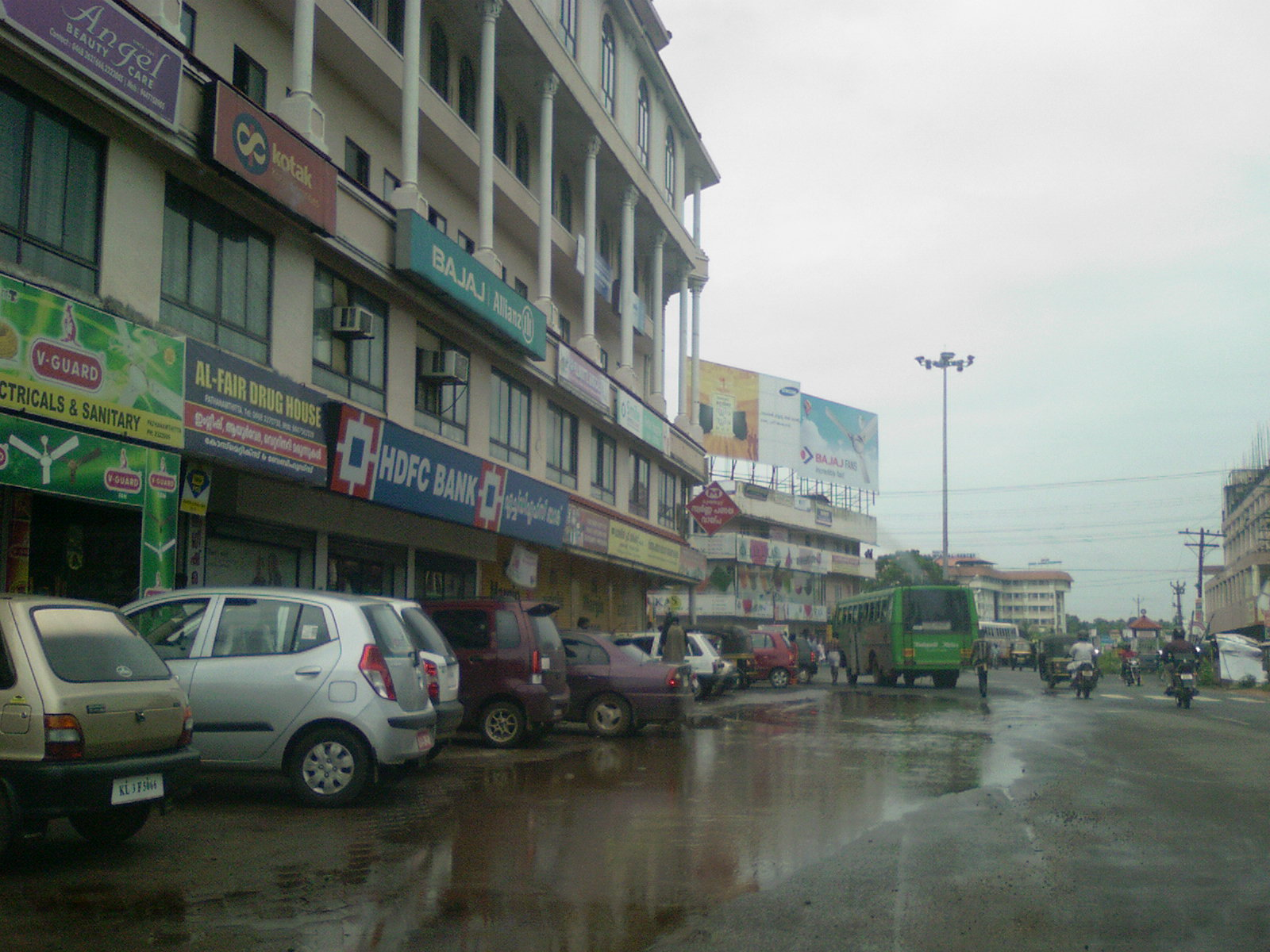
Pathanamthitta town is on The Main Eastern Highway

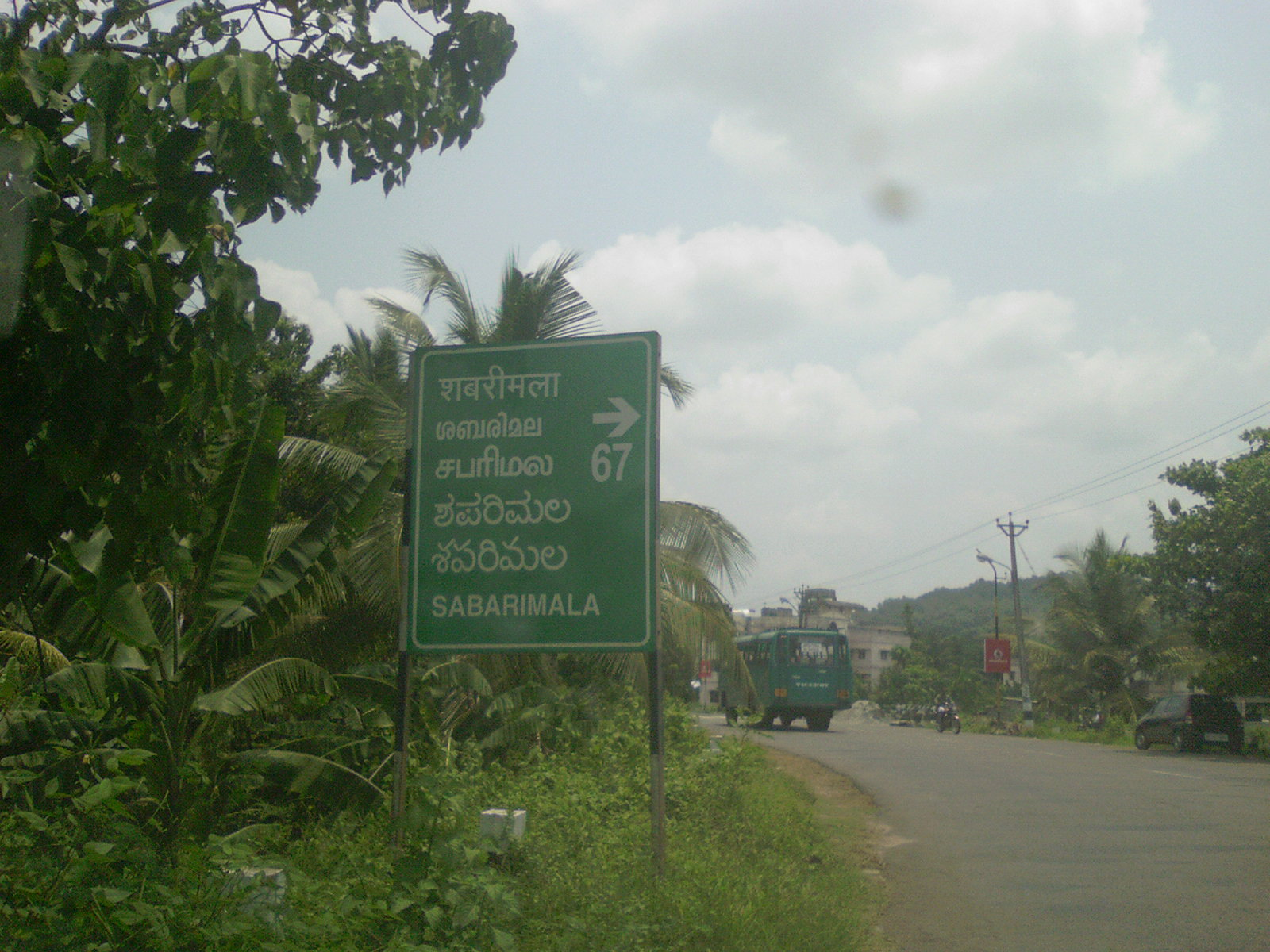
A sign-board that indicates the direction to Sabarimala. The multilingual board is written in Hindi, Malayalam, Tamil, Kannada, Telugu language and English language

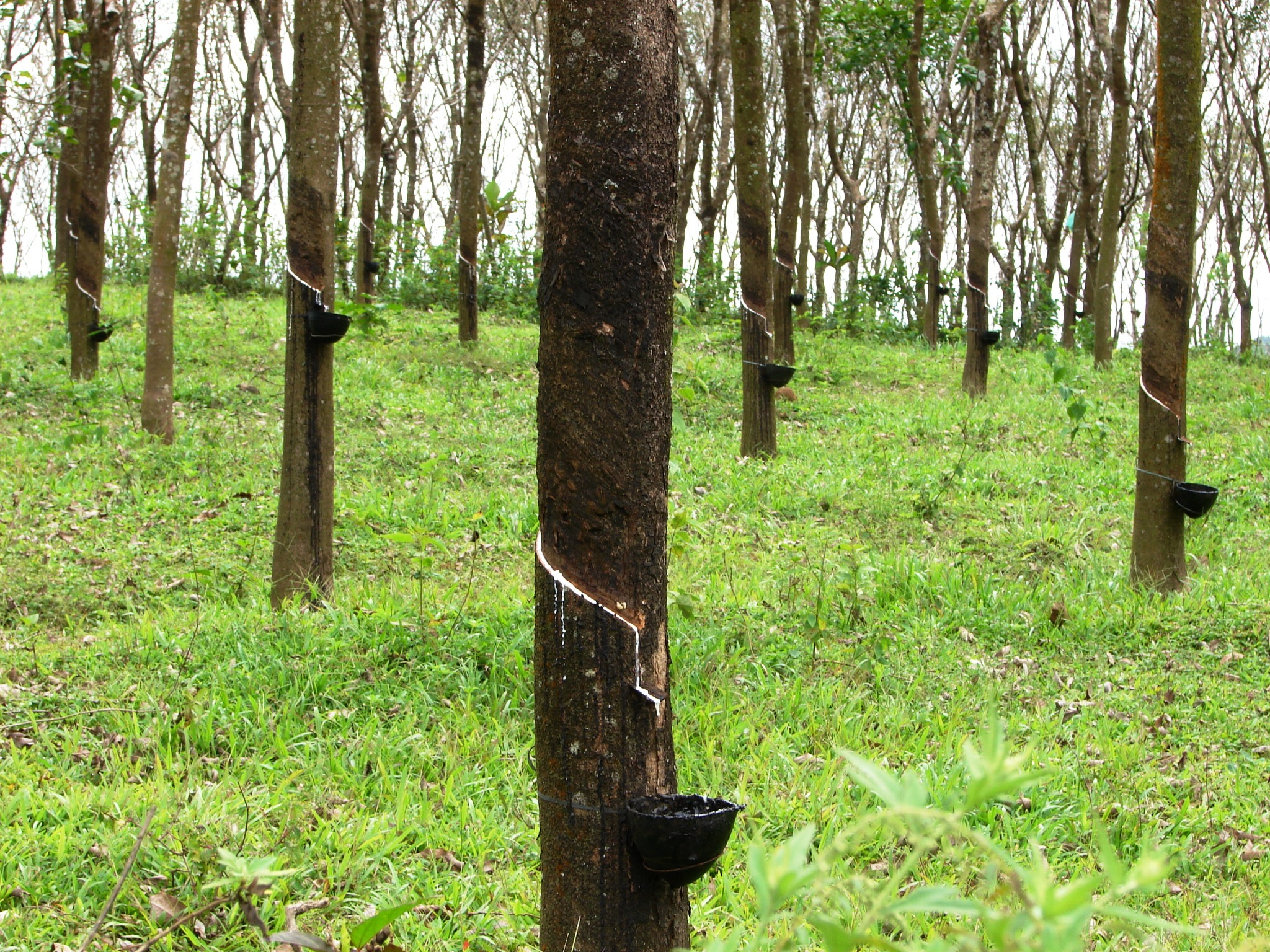
Large rubber plantations are generally seen along the Main Eastern Highway

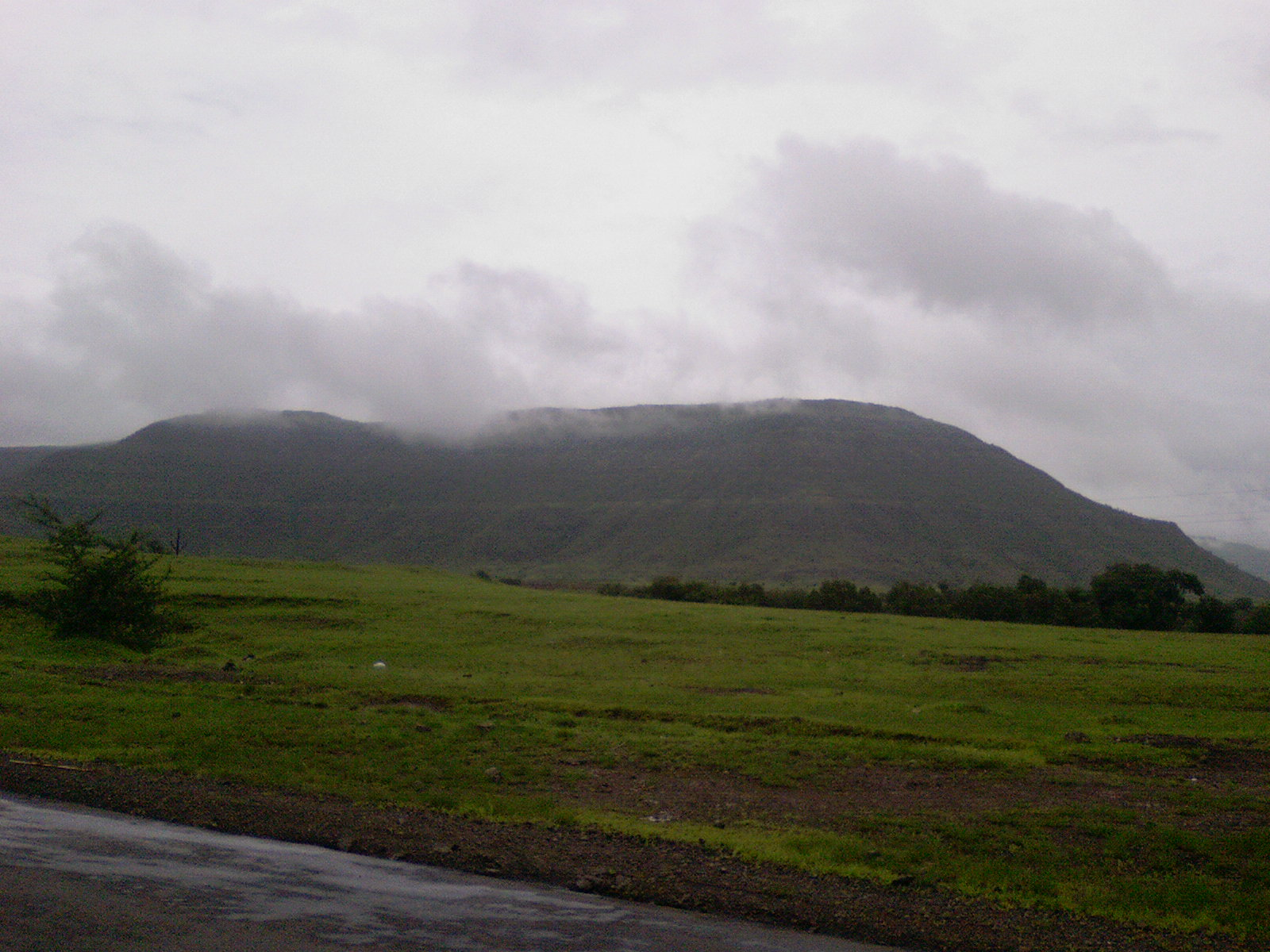
A journey through The Main Eastern Highway is a refreshing experience

The Main Eastern Highway is the lifeline of the high range townships of the midlands and highlands of eastern kerala Kerala state, India. It is also known as Punalur-Muvattupuzha Highway. Main Eastern Highway is categorized as State Highway - 08 ( SH-08 ) of Kerala. It is the second longest State Highway of Kerala covering a distance of 153.6 km. The districts it passes through are Kollam, Pathanamthitta, Kottayam, Idukki and Ernakulam.

It interconnects the major towns of Punalur, Pathanapuram, Konni, Pathanamthitta, Ranni, Manimala, Ponkunnam, Pala, Thodupuzha to the main intersection at Muvattupuzha merging to MC Road which extends northwards till Angamaly at NH 66.

== Route description ==
Punalur - Alimukku - Piravanthoor - Pathanapuram - Kallumkadavu Junction (joins SH 05) - Kalanjoor - Koodal - Konni - central junction (joins SH 80) -Kumbazha (Pathanamthitta, meets T.K.Road / SH - 07) - Mylapra - Ranni - Karikkattoor - Manimala - Cheruvally - Ponkunnam - Paika- Pala - Thodupuzha - Vazhakulam - Muvattupuzha (joins MC Road -SH 01) The economy of the High-Ranges of South and Central Kerala largely depends on the Main Eastern Highway. The main trunk road to Sabarimala, Kerala's Largest Pilgrim Centre starts from Main Eastern Highway near Pathanamthitta. Though it is the shortest route to Angamaly and Northern Kerala townships from Punalur, (The Second Largest City of Kollam District) and in turn from the Tamil Nadu townships Tenkasi, Tirunelveli and Thoothukudi. It is not developed to its capacity. It acts as a parallel road to the Main Central Road. (M.C.Road/SH-01). It is also the Shortest route to the Kerala State Capital Thiruvananthapuram from Kumali and other major townships of Idukki district Like Munnar, Kattappana, Thodupuzha, Moolamattam, Nedumkandam etc. Check the main eastern highway videos here.

=== Townships on the Main Eastern Highway ===
The townships Punalur, Alimukku, Piravanthoor, Pathanapuram, Koodal, Konni, Kumbazha, Ranni, Manimala, Ponkunnam, Pala, Thodupuzha, Muvattupuzha comes under the Main eastern highway road

== Future ==
=== KSTP Project ===
The upgrading work of Punalur -Ponkunnam-Thodupuzha stretch is currently under progress as part of the World Bank funded Kerala State Transport Project (KSTP).

== See also ==
- M. C. Road
- Roads in Kerala
- List of state highways in Kerala
