= State Highway 9 (Kerala) =

Highway in Kerala, India

State Highway 9
- Kottayam - Kozhencherry Road
- SH 9 highlighted in red

Route information
- Maintained by Kerala Public Works Department
- Length: 44.4 km (27.6 mi)

Major junctions
- North end: NH 183 in Kottayam
- South end: SH 7 near Kozhencherry

Location
- Country: India
- State: Kerala
- Districts: Kottayam, Pathanamthitta

Highway system
- Roads in India; Expressways; National; State; Asian; State Highways in Kerala
| ← SH 8 | → SH 10 |

State Highway 9 (SH 9) is a state highway in Kerala, India that starts in Kanjikuzhi and ends in Kozhencherry. The highway connects Kottayam and Pathanamthitta districts. The highway is 44.4 km long.

== Route description ==
Kanjikuzhi - Puthupally - Karukachal - Mallappally junction - Vennikulam- Pullad (Overlaps T.K. Road / SH 7) - Kozhencherry

=== Townships on the state highway ===
- Puthuppally : Manarcadu - Thenganal Road crosses
- Karukachal : Changanassery - Vazhoor Road crosses
- Mallappally
- Kozhenchery

== See also ==
- Roads in Kerala
- List of state highways in Kerala
