= State Highway 10 (Kerala) =

Highway in Kerala, India

State Highway 10
- Mavelikkara - Kozhencherry Road
- SH 10 highlighted in red

Route information
- Maintained by Kerala Public Works Department
- Length: 28.7 km (17.8 mi)

Major junctions
- West end: Mavelikkara
- SH 1 / NH 183 in Chengannur
- South end: SH 7 near Kozhencherry

Location
- Country: India
- State: Kerala
- Districts: Alappuzha, Pathanamthitta

Highway system
- Roads in India; Expressways; National; State; Asian; State Highways in Kerala
| ← SH 9 | → SH 11 |

State Highway 10 (SH 10) is a state highway in Kerala, India, that starts in Mavelikkara and ends in Kozhencherry. The highway is 28.7 km long.

== Route description ==
Mavelikkara - Puthiyacavu - Cheriyanad - Perisseri - Chengannur (Joins and overlaps MC Road) - Malakkara - Aranmula - Thekkemala (joins and overlaps T.K.Road / SH - 07 to Pathanamthitta) - Kozhencherry

== See also ==
- Roads in Kerala
- List of state highways in Kerala
