= Rajeev Sivshankar =

Indian writer

Rajeev Sivashankar
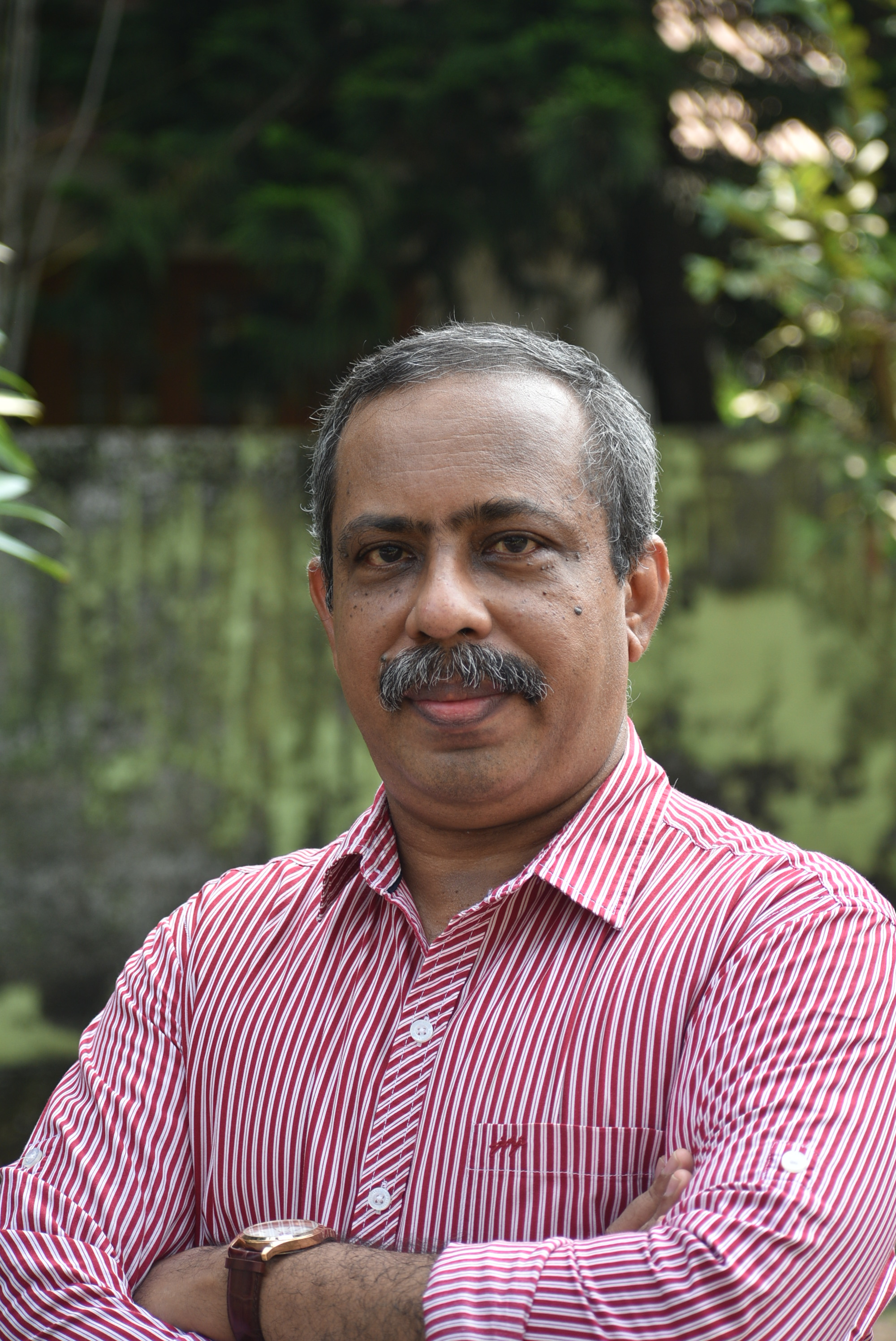
- Rajeev Sivshankar in 2022
- Born: 1967 (age 58–59); Konni, Pathanamthitta, India
- Occupations: Journalist, Novelist
- Spouse: Rajasree P.S
- Children: Nila Rajeev
- Writing career
- Language: Malayalam
- Notable works: Thamovedam, Pranasancharam, kalpramanam,Putrasooktham, Karal marx Kailasamveedu, Maraporul, Kalipakam, Pennarasu, Divyam, kunjalithira, Nagaphanam, Rebecca, Padam, Jalam, Poru, Homework, Atheetham, Sathyam, Pranayapathi, Yamadhari, Madam, Chorachuvappulla Sooryakanthi, Lallu Uncleinte Kusruthikal (Novels), Daivamarathile Ila, Goodam, Prethasavary (Short story Collections), Maranavaridhi (Novelite Collection), Meesamahathmyam (Novel Study)

Rajeev Sivashankar is an Indian novelist and short story writer in Malayalam language. He is from Konni, Pathanamtitta district of the south Indian state of Kerala.Now living at Kottayam.

== Early life ==
At age 12 he won the Mathrubhoomi story writing competition. His story (Minnalppinarine Snehicha penkutty) was published in Mathrubhoomi weekly.

== Career ==
He works in Malayala Manorama (Kottayam) as assistant editor.

At age 45 he resumed writing, producing 23 novels and 3 short story collections. Thamovedam, Pranasancharam, Kalpramanam, Puthrasooktham, Rabeca, Sathyam, Maraporul etc. are his novels. Daivamarathile Ila, Goodam etc. is his story collection. He received Thoppil Revi Award for the nove Pranasancharam. Received Manoraj Award For best story collection (Daivamarathile Ila).

== Novels ==
- Thamoveadam, published in April 2013 by D. C. Books, is Rajeev's first novel. The novel is based on the growing anarchist cult in the state of Kerala. Set in an imaginary village called Kavathy, the novel discusses the issue through the eccentric main character Viswanathan. He came to kochi and took charge of satanic worship.The first part of the book deals with Viswanathan's childhood and early youth and is set in the fictitious village of Kavathy in Central Travancore. It forms the core of the novel. In the second part, the arena shifts to Cochin and to the world of Black Mass and its followers.
- Pranasancharam –Rajeev's second novel, Pranasancharam, was published in October 2013 by DC books. It discusses the other side of material life and travels through a fantasy-like world.
- Kalpramanam–Rajeev's third novel, published in November 2014 by NBS (SPCS)an in November 2018 by Logos. It discusses environmental issues in Kerala.
- Putrasooktham–Rajeev's fourth novel, published in November 2015 by Green Books.
- Karal Marx's Kailasam veedu–Satirical account of village life. Published in August 2016 by Poorna Publication and re publishe by Saikatha Books in March 2021.
- Maraporul–fiction based on the life of Sri Sankaracharya.Published By DC Books in May 2016.
- Kalipakam–fiction based on Kali's story in the Mahabharatha.Published By DC Books in May 2018.
- Pennarasu–Celebration of womanhood, statement against the patriarchy. Published By DC Books in May2018.
- Divyam–magical realism fantasy happening in Kerala-Tamil Nadu border. Published in February 2019 by Saikatham Books.
- Kunjalithira– Kunjalithira portrays the life of Kunjali maraykkar who made fear in the heart of Portuguese. It depicts the history of a centuries-old battle, betrayal, and atrociousness.Published By DC Books in May 2019.
- Nagaphanam–Nagaphanam is the voyage through the mystic realms of the nagaclan/race ranging from Ananthan to Kaliyan. It further explores the secret of life, death, and rebirth through the legendary figure Parikshith's being. Published By DC Books in June 2020.
- Rebecca–Rebecca is an intriguing murder mystery in Malayalam. It is based on a real incident that evoked terror in Kerala. It is a metafiction, where the writer juxtaposes a novel within the novel. Fear, mystery and suspicion in the work will engross the readers from the beginning till the end. The novel belongs to the genre of crime fiction. Published By DC Books in September 2021.
- Padam–Aa interesting life of an old lady who lived her life with the Malayalam Film industry.Published By DC Books in January 2022.
- Jalam– An engaging novel built around themes of magic and fantasy, enticing readers on a captivating imaginative journey.
- Poru– A novel set against the backdrop of the fourteen-day duel between Bheema and Jarasandha in the Mahabharata. It seeks to fill the lacunae left by Vyasa. Published By DC Books
- Homework– An inquiry into the mysterious death of a school teacher. A detective novel that unfolds through the winding village lanes of Kerala.Published by Manorama Books
- Atheetham– A novel that discusses the birth and evolution of godmen, or humans deified to the status of gods.Published By DC Books
- Sathyam– A novel based on the life of the legendary Malayalam film actor Sathyan. In many ways, it also serves as a narrative of the history of Malayalam cinema.Published by Mathrubhoomi Books
- Pranayapathi– A middle-aged man looks back on his life, retracing the stories of the women who shaped his journey in this reflective novel.Published by Manorama Books
- Yamadhari– A novel that explores the mystery of a Himalayan yogi endowed with extraordinary spiritual powers who exerts influence over the lives of a group of people.Published by Manorama Books
- Madam– A novel that reflects humanitarian perspectives beyond religious factions in an age where religion itself becomes an intoxication for many.Published by Mathrubhoomi Books
- Chorachuvappulla Sooryakanthi– A novel written against the backdrop of the Burari murders in Delhi and reimagined in the context of Kerala.
- Lallu Uncleinte Kusruthikal–A gripping novel that fascinates young readers and encourages them to delve deeper into nature and the living world around them.Published By DC Books
- Daivamarathile Ila–story collection published in 2015 by DC Books. Includes "Daivavicharam", "Samadhanthinte vazhikal" and "Kailasanadhan"
- Goodam–Eleven story collection published in October 2017. Published by Saikatham Books
- Prethasavary–eleven story collection. Published By DC Books in June 2022.
- Maranavaridhi–It is a collection of five novelites that depict the uniqueness imparted to one's life by the juxtaposition of fate and coincidence at critical junctures.Published By Saikatha Books in October 2020.Published by Saikatham Books
- Meesamahathmyam– Detailed study about S.Hareesh's Novel MEESA.Published By DC Books in February 2021.

== Recognition ==
Received the Thoppil Ravi Memorial award for best novel(Prana Sancharam) in 2013.

Manoraj Award for best Shortstories collection (Daiivamarathile Ila) in 2016
