= Vallamkulam Bridge =

Bridge in India

Coordinates: 9.3854°N 76.6194°E

Vallamkulam Bridge is a two-lane concrete bridge linking the Eraviperoor and Kaviyoor panchayats in Pathanamthitta district, Kerala, India. The Vallamkulam Bridge crosses the Manimala river on the Thiruvalla - Kozhencherry Road. It is 6 km away from Thiruvalla town.

== History ==
The original bridge was a narrow steel bridge, constructed four decades ago. It was the only steel bridge on the main trunk route to Sabarimala. Kerala Chief Minister Oommen Chandy inaugurated the newly constructed bridge across river Manimala at Vallamkulam on the Thiruvalla-Kumbazha State Highway 7 on 25 March 2012. The 75-metre-long, 11.5-metre-wide new bridge was constructed at a cost of Rs.4.5 crore in two years.
