= Aluvamkudi Sree Mahadeva Temple =

Hindu temple in Kerala, India

- ആലുവാംകുടി ശ്രീ മഹാദേവ ക്ഷേത്രം
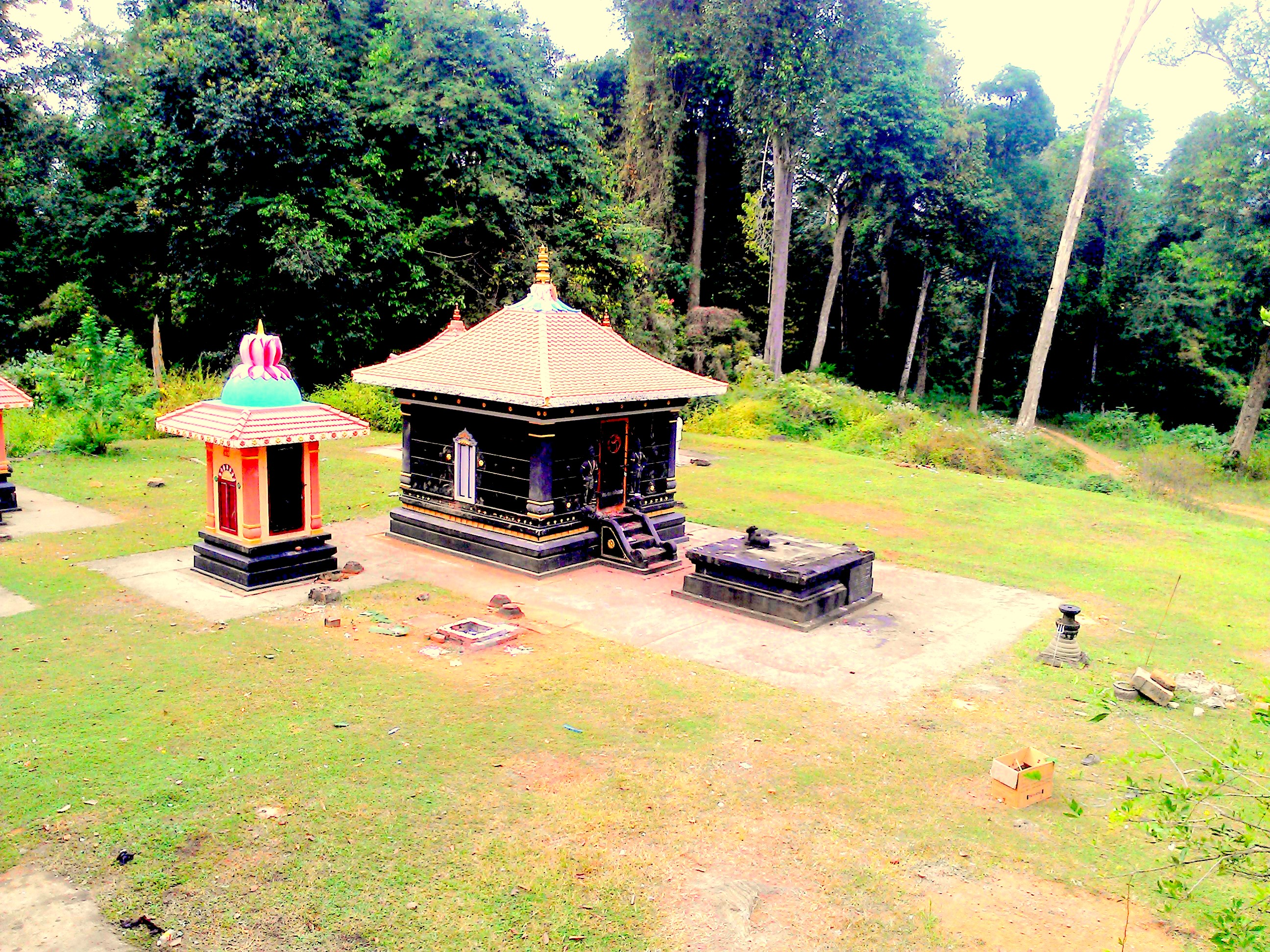

- Location within Kerala

Religion
- Affiliation: Hinduism
- District: Pathanamthitta
- Deity: Shiva
- Festival: Shivaratri

Location
- Location: Gurunathanmannu
- State: Kerala
- Country: India
- Coordinates: 9°16′5″N 77°0′22″E

Architecture
- Type: Kerala style

Aluvamkudi Sree Mahadeva Temple is an old Hindu temple situated in the mountainous forests of Pathanamthitta district, Kerala, India. The temple dedicated to Shiva is said to have been created by Parashurama. It was found during a Devaprashnam (astrological ritual) that Rama had conducted poojas in this temple. The archaeological department has stated that the temple is approximately more than 2000 years old.

The temple was abandoned for a long time and later, it was discovered by a hunter in the 1940's. People living in places like Gurunathanmannu and Thekkuthode were the first to come and inspect the temple. Nowadays, regular poojas are conducted on the first day of every Malayalam month. Special poojas and festival are conducted on Shivaratri day every year since its rediscovery.

== Location ==
The temple is located inside deep forest which falls under Vadasserikkara range of Ranni forest division. Nearest populated places are Gurunathanmannu and Thoompakkulam.

== How to reach ==
- From Pathanamthitta: Pathanamthitta - Konni - Thannithodu - Thekkuthodu - Thoompakkulam - Aluvamkudi Temple
- From Chittar: Chittar - Seethathodu - Gurunathanmannu - Aluvamkudi Temple or Chittar - Vayyattupuzha - Therakathummannu - Kunnam - Aluvamkudi Temple
