= Kumbazha =

- Village
- Location in Pathanamthitta, Kerala, India Kumbazha (India)
- Coordinates: 9°15′0″N 76°48′0″E
- Country: India
- State: Kerala
- District: Pathanamthitta

Government
  - Body: Congress

Languages
  - Official: Malayalam, English
- Time zone: UTC+5:30 (IST)
- Postal code: 689653
- Vehicle registration: KL-03
- Climate: Tropical (Köppen)

Kumbazha is a main junction nestled within the heart of Pathanamthitta Municipality of Pathanamthitta Town, located in Kerala state, India. The serene Achenkovil river gracefully meanders through this historic locale. The town's prominence is further accentuated by the terminus of the Thiruvalla - Kumbazha (SH-7) road, also known as the T.K road. Once a bustling marketplace, Kumbazha derives its name from the Malayalam word "Kumbhi," signifying an elephant, hinting at its past grandeur.

== Location ==
Kumbazha Jn. is 3 km away from Pathanamthitta Central Jn and is considered as the east exit of Pathanamthitta town. It is the meeting point of two major state highways, T.K.Road (SH - 07) and Main Eastern Highway (Punalur-Pathanamthitta-Muvattupuzha Road / SH - 08). The proposed new MC road (Thiruvananthapuram–Angamaly Greenfield Highway) passes through Kumbazha.

== Pilgrim Centres ==
Kumbazha serves as the main access route for visitors going to the Malayalappuzha Devi Temple. It also hosts several significant religious sites, including the Valanchuzhy Temple, st.simeon the stylites orthodox cathedral and St. Mary's Orthodox Valiya Cathedral along with various other pilgrimage centers.

Kumbazha is home to a large Christian community, with churches found in nearly every part of the town. The Kumbazha St. Mary's Orthodox Valiya Cathedral is particularly notable, as it is the oldest church in the area and St. Mary's Malankara Catholic Church also known as Kumbazha Pally is the church with the most families and The Largest Convention Centre In Kumbazha is Owned by this church.

== Festivals ==
The Samyuktha Christmas Celebration is held annually in Kumbazha on 25 December. Its 50th consecutive celebration took place in 2022. Local churches organize activities including carol singing, nativity plays, community meals and religious services. The event is attended by members of the Christian community and people of other faiths.

== Notable people ==
- Kumbazha Achen(Priest, St. Mary's Malankara Catholic Church, Kumbazha)
- Anil Kumbazha (Film Director)
- Renil Mammen Biju(India Book of Records & Asia Book of Records Holder)

== See also ==
- Pathanamthitta District
- Pathanamthitta Municipality
- Main Eastern Highway
