= Pampupara =

- village
- Country: India
- State: Kerala
- District: Idukki

Languages
  - Official: Malayalam, English
- Time zone: UTC+5:30 (IST)
- Postal code: 685 551
- Telephone code: 048682
- Vehicle registration: KL-06, KL-37
- Coastline: 0 kilometres (0 mi)
- Nearest city: Anakkara
- Literacy: 80%
- Lok Sabha Constituency: Idukki
- Kerala Assembly Constituency: Peermade / Peermedu
- Civic agency: shared by Chakkupallam and Vandanmedu

Pampupara is a village in the Idukki district of Kerala, India. It is located between Sulthankada and Kadasikadavu. This settlement is famous for its cardamom plantations, pepper grows and paddy fields.

The nearest Airports are Kochi 175 km and Madurai 165 km. Closest railway stations are Kottayam 124 km, Changanassery 130 km, Kochi 175 km and Madurai 165 km. The nearest private and KSRTC Bus stations are Kattappana 20 Km and Kumily 13 Km. Its pin code is 685551.

The population includes people migrated from Kottayam and Ernakulam districts of Kerala and Theni and Madurai districts of Tamil Nadu. The main source of income of the natives is agricultural produces (Pepper, Cardamom, Ginger, etc.). There are many cardamom drying units available in the area.

M/s South Indian Green Cardamom Company Limited, Edassery Group, Farmers Grove Private Limited, etc are some of the famous industry and trade houses in Pampupara.

The local Mariamman temple is famous for its annual festivals and religious congregations during Navarathri and Pongal festivals. Anakkara 8th Mile is 2 km from here which is the nearest market.
