= Kadasikadavu =

Kadassikkadavu
- Village
- Location in Kerala Kadassikkadavu (India)
- Coordinates: 9°41′02″N 77°08′46″E
- Country: India
- State: Kerala
- District: Idukki

Government
  - Type: Panchayat
  - Body: Vandanmedu Panchayat
- Time zone: UTC+5:30 (IST)
- Vehicle registration: KL-37

Kadassikkadavu is a village located on Munnar - Kumily state highway in Idukki district of Kerala, India. It is a part of Vandanmedu panchayath in Central Kerala Division. It is located 33 km (21 mi) south of the district headquarters at Painavu, 11 km (6.8 mi) from Kattappana and 154 km (96 mi) from the state capital of Thiruvananthapuram.

== Language ==
Malayalam and Tamil are widely spoken by natives. Most of them are literate in Hindi and English too.

== Transport ==
Being located on Kumily Munnar route, this place is well connected through road. People depend Buses, Autos and Jeeps to meet their local transportation requirements. The nearest railway stations are Kottayam and Changanassery. Airports are Kochi and Madurai.

== Religious Places ==
The famous places of worship in Kadassikada are -

- Siva Parvathi temple, Kadassikkada
- Mariyamman Kovil, Pampupara
- Mangala Devi temple
- Juma Masjid Kadassikkada
- CSI Church
- Full gospel church of christ India

== Education ==
There are no schools or colleges in Kadassikada except Anganvadi or pre-school facilities. and the aspiring students need to travel to Anakkara, Puttadi, Kumily, Kattappana and Kumily for schooling and higher studies.
