= Sulthankada =

- village
- Country: India
- State: Kerala
- District: Idukki

Government
  - Body: Chakkupallam

Area
  - Total: 10 km^{2} (3.9 sq mi)

Population
  - Total: 2,000
  - Density: 200/km^{2} (520/sq mi)

Languages
  - Official: Malayalam, English
- Time zone: UTC+5:30 (IST)
- PIN: 685551
- Telephone code: 048682
- Vehicle registration: KL-06, KL-37
- Coastline: 0 kilometres (0 mi)
- Nearest city: Anakkara
- Literacy: 85%
- Lok Sabha Constituency: Idukki
- Kerala Assembly Constituency: Peermade / Peermedu
- Civic agency: Chakkupallam

Sulthankada is a village in the Idukki district of Kerala, India. It is located between Pampupara and Anakkara on Kumily - Munnar highway. This village includes tiny settlements - Chittampara, Keerimukku, Churuli Valavu, Puthumana Medu, Thenganal Kavala, Thaloda, etc. mostly covering cardamom and pepper plantations and paddy fields.

The village is a local government electoral ward.

The nearest Airports are Kochi 175km and Madurai 165km. Closest railway stations are Kottayam 124km, Changanassery 130km, Kochi 175km and Madurai 165km. The nearest private and KSRTC Bus stations are Kattappana 20km and Kumily 13km.

The population includes people migrated from Kottayam and Ernakulam districts of Kerala and Theni and Madurai districts of Tamil Nadu.

Main source of income is agricultural produces (pepper, cardamom, ginger, paddy, coffee beans, tea leaves, etc.). There are many cardamom dry units available here.

There is a Pentecostal church.
