= State Highway 43 (Kerala) =

Highway in Kerala, India

State Highway 43
- Muvattupuzha – Theni Road
- SH 43 highlighted in red

Route information
- Maintained by Kerala Public Works Department
- Length: 105 km (65 mi)
- Component highways: SH 33 from near Kulamavu to Cheruthoni, Kattappana to Puliyanmala; SH 19 from Puliyanmala to near Chettukuzhi

Major junctions
- West end: NH 85 in Muvattupuzha
- SH 40 in Kodikulam; SH 33 near Kulamavu; NH 185 in Cheruthoni; SH 33 in Kattappana; SH 19 in Puliyanmala
- East end: SH 40/TN-MDR 90 in KL/TN border at Cumbummettu

Location
- Country: India
- State: Kerala
- Districts: Ernakulam, Idukki

Highway system
- Roads in India; Expressways; National; State; Asian; State Highways in Kerala
← SH 42	→ SH 44

State Highway 43 (SH 43) is a State Highway in Kerala, India that starts in Muvattupuzha and ends in Theni Town (Tamil Nadu). The highway is 105 km long. The Route Starts from Chali Bridge at Muvattupuzha Connecting to NH 49 towards Kothamangalam.

== Route map ==
Muvattupuzha –Kalloorkad – Kodikulam – Udumbannoor- kaithappara - maniyarankudi- Idukki – Mariyapuram – Thankamony- Erattayar – Kattappana – Puliyanmala – Anyartholu- Chettukuzhi - Kuzhitholu - Cumbammettu – Cumbam - Theni

== Districts connected by state highway ==
SH 43 goes through the Ernakulam and Idukki districts of Kerala State and the Theni district of Tamil Nadu State.

== Townships on the state highway ==
Idukki, Kattappana and Cumbum are the major towns on the course of this State Highway

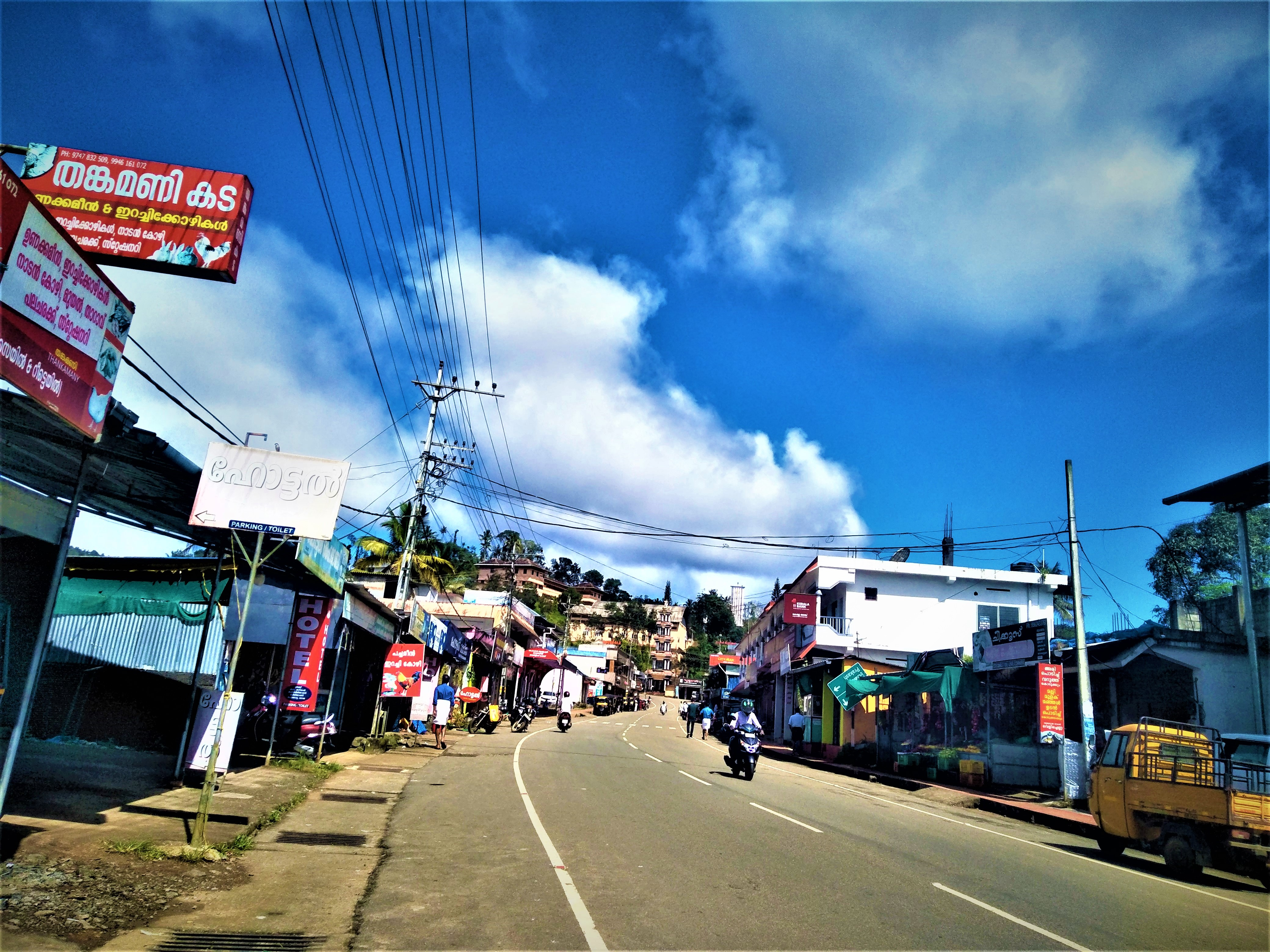
State Highway 43 in Thankamany

== Strategic importance ==
When this State Highway is completed, This Route Will be a Shorter and Less Hilly Route to Reach Theni and Madurai in Tamil Nadu state from Cochin City. This Will bring developments to the High-Range (Hilly Region in Central Kerala) Regions of Idukki District as well as Easier, Shorter Way to Reach Thodupuzha Muvattupuzha and Ernakulam. This Route is Essentially a Hill Highway and is the shortest connection from Idukki to Thodupuzha or Moovattupuzha with least hairpins. The route connecting Udumbannoor and Maniyarankudi is still under construction. There is severe objection from the Forest dept since the 10 km route is through the forest land. Historically this SH is through the fort separating princely kingdoms of thekkumkur and vadakkumkur. After construction this will be the shortest and easiest access from high range heartland to reach Kerala townships of Thodupuzha, Kottayam and Ernakulam. There is a huge demand from people to complete the construction of this route immediately.

== See also ==
- Roads in Kerala
- List of state highways in Kerala
