= State Highway 33 (Kerala) =

Highway in Kerala, India

State Highway 33
- Thodupuzha- Puliyanmala road
- SH 33 highlighted in red

Route information
- Maintained by Kerala Public Works Department
- Length: 92.1 km (57.2 mi)
- Component highways: NH 185 from Cheruthoni to Kattappana

Major junctions
- West end: SH 8 in Thodupuzha
- SH 44 in Muttom; SH 41 in Arakulam; SH 43 near Kulamavu; SH 42 in Painavu; NH 185 in Cheruthoni; SH 59 in Kattappana
- East end: SH 19 in Puliyanmala

Location
- Country: India
- State: Kerala
- Districts: Idukki

Highway system
- Roads in India; Expressways; National; State; Asian; State Highways in Kerala
← SH 32	→ SH 34

State Highway 33 (SH 33) is a state highway in Kerala, India that starts in Thodupuzha and ends at Kumily road. The highway is 92.1 km long.

== Route map ==
Thodupuzha junction (SH 8) - Muttom - Kuruthikalam - Meenmutty - Painavu junction - Road to Idukki dam takes off - Kattappana junction - Puliyanmala - joins Munnar - Kumily road

== See also ==
- Roads in Kerala
- List of state highways in Kerala
