= State Highway 13 (Kerala) =

Highway in Kerala, India

State Highway 13
- K K Road

Route information
- Maintained by Kerala Public Works Department
- Length: 107.9 km (67.0 mi)

Major junctions
- From: Kottayam, Kottayam, Kerala
- To: Kumily, Idukki, Kerala

Location
- Country: India
- State: Kerala
- Primary destinations: Kottayam, Manarcaud, Pampady, Ponkunnam, Kanjirappally, Mundakayam, Kuttikkanam, Peermade, Vandiperiyar, Kumily

Highway system
- Roads in India; Expressways; National; State; Asian; State Highways in Kerala
← SH 12	→ SH 14

The Kottayam–Kumily Road, better known as K K Road is the state highway connecting Kottayam and Idukki districts of Kerala state, India. It is designated as State Highway 13 (SH 13) by the Kerala Public Works Department. It shares its route with National Highway 183 (NH 183), and it is 107.9 kilometres (67.0 mi) long. It is the first rubberised road in Kerala.Its Oldest and first name is Cardamom hill road.

== Route description ==
This road starts from NH 183 at Kottayam and ends at Kumily. The K K Road passes through

=== Kottayam ===
Manarcaud → Pampady> Kodungoor→ Ponkunnam → Kanjirappally → Mundakayam.

=== Idukki ===
Kuttikkanam → Peermade → Vandiperiyar → Kumily.

== See also ==
- Roads in Kerala
- List of state highways in Kerala
