= State Highway 19 (Kerala) =

Highway in Kerala, India

State Highway 19
- Munnar - Kumily Road
- SH 19 highlighted in red

Route information
- Maintained by Kerala Public Works Department
- Length: 106.0 km (65.9 mi)
- Component highways: NH 85 from Munnar to Poopara

Major junctions
- South end: SH 18 in Munnar
- SH 40 / SH 42 in Nedumkandam; SH 33 in Puliyanmala; SH 43 in Vandanmedu
- North end: NH 183 in Kumily

Location
- Country: India
- State: Kerala
- Districts: Idukki

Highway system
- Roads in India; Expressways; National; State; Asian; State Highways in Kerala
← SH 18	→ SH 21

State Highway 19 (SH 19) is a state highway in Kerala that starts from Munnar and ends Kumily. The highway is 106.0 km long.

== Route map ==
Munnar (starts from km 0/2 of Munnar Topstation Highway) - Devikulam town - Poopara - Kumbanpara road starts - Pooppara - Bodimettu road starts - Santhanpara Jn - Udumbumchola town - Vattappara junction - Amaravathy - Kumily (joins Kottayam Kumily Highway)

== See also ==
- Roads in Kerala
- List of state highways in Kerala
