= Puliyanmala =

- village
- Location in Kerala, India Puliyanmala (India)
- Coordinates: 9°45′0″N 77°10′0″E
- Country: India
- State: Kerala
- District: Idukki

Government
  - Type: Municipality
  - Body: Kattappana municipality
- Elevation: 1,100 m (3,600 ft)

Languages
  - Official: Malayalam, English, Tamil
- Time zone: UTC+5:30 (IST)
- PIN: 685515
- Area code: 04868
- Vehicle registration: KL-37, KL-69
- Nearest cities: Kattappana, Nedumkandam

Puliyanmala is a village in Idukki district of Kerala state, India. The places intersects SH-19 (Munnar-Kumily) and SH-33 (Thodupuzha-Puliyanmala), which are the two important state highways in the district. It comes under the premises of Kattappana municipality and belongs to the newly formed Idukki constituency.

== Location ==
Puliyanamala is located very close to the border of Theni district in Tamil Nadu. It is about 6 km from Kattappana, 27 km from Kumily, 12 km from Cumbummettu via Annyarthozhu and 15 km from Nedumkandam. It is a high altitude region situated about 1,100 m (3,600 ft) above mean sea level. The tourist spot at Ramakkalmedu is 17 km distant.

== Economy ==
Predominantly Puliyanmala is an agricultural village with many vast cardamom plantations. It became the first place in Kerala to have a high-tech slaughterhouse, where 30 cattle can be slaughtered per day.

== Institutions ==
- Carmel CMI public school
- Navadarsanagram De-addiction centre

== See also ==
- Vandanmedu
- Anakkara
