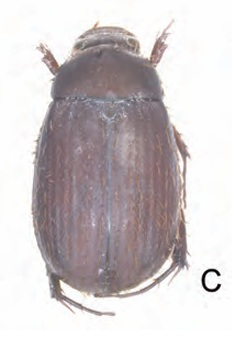

Scientific classification
- Kingdom: Animalia
- Phylum: Arthropoda
- Class: Insecta
- Order: Coleoptera
- Suborder: Polyphaga
- Infraorder: Scarabaeiformia
- Family: Scarabaeidae
- Genus: Maladera
- Species: M. kumilyensis

Binomial name
- Maladera kumilyensis Ahrens & Fabrizi, 2016

= Maladera kumilyensis =

Species of beetle

Maladera kumilyensis is a species of beetle of the family Scarabaeidae. It is found in India (Kerala).

== Description ==
Adults reach a length of about 9.1–9.6 mm. They have a dark brown, oblong-oval body with yellowish antennae. They are mostly dull and there are some long setae on the pronotum and elytra.

== Etymology ==
The species name refers to its type locality, Kumily.
