= Anakkara =

Anakkara may refer to:

- Anakkara (Palakkad), a village in Palakkad district in Kerala state, India
- Anakkara (Idukki), a village in Idukki district in Kerala state, India
