= S. Joseph =

Indian Malayalam-language poet (born 1965)

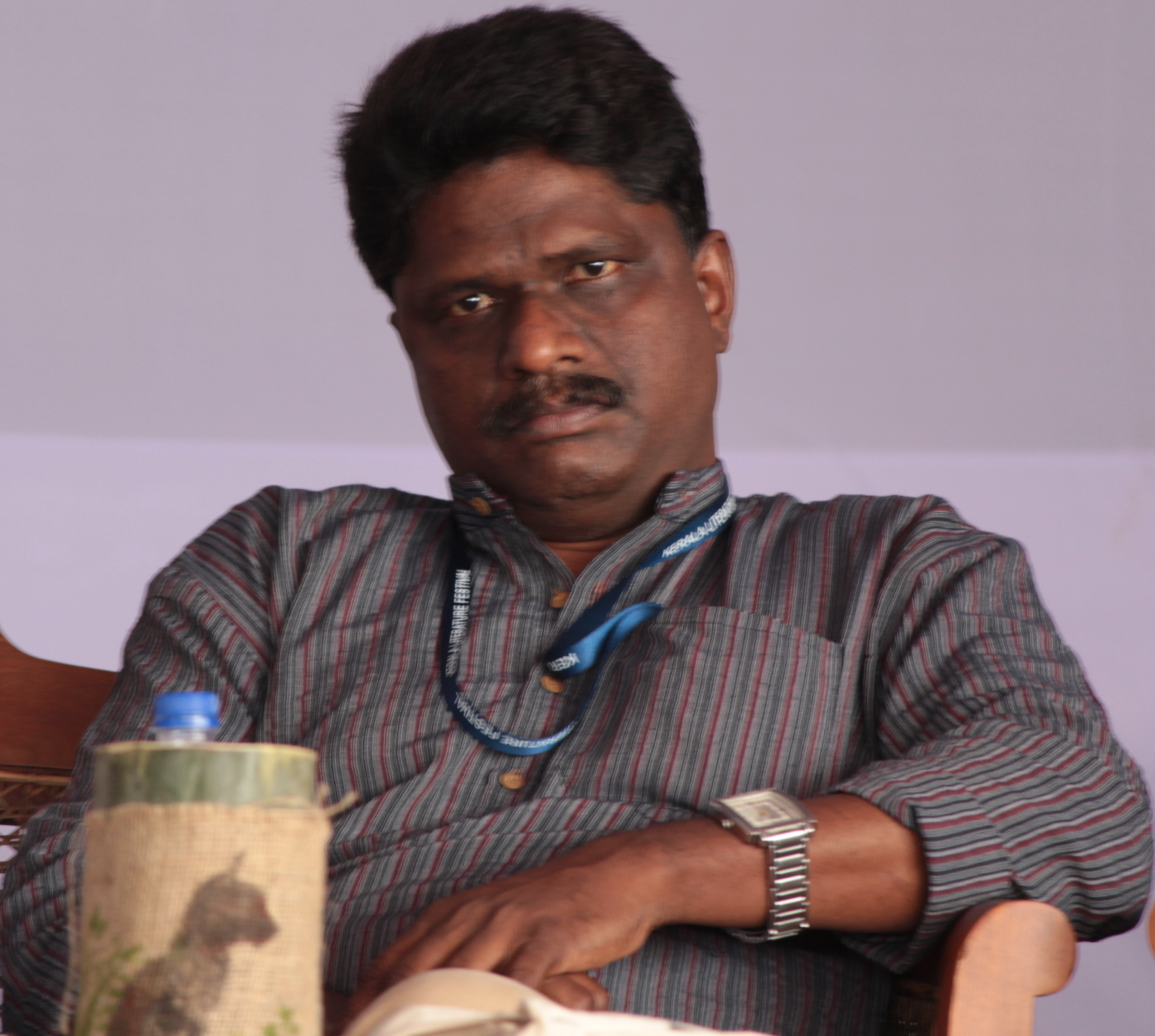
S joseph

S. Joseph (born 1965) is an Indian poet writing in Malayalam. He was born in the village of Pattithanam near Ettumanoor.

== Bibliography ==
Poetry collections

- Karutha Kallu (Kottayam: D. C. Books, 2000)
- Meenkaran (Kottayam: D. C. Books, 2003)
- Identity card (Kottayam: D. C. Books, 2005)
- Uppante Kooval Varakkunnu (Kottayam: D. C. Books, 2011)
- Vellam Ethra Lalithamanu (2011).
- Chandranodoppam (DC Books:Kottayam)
