= Chittampara =

- village
- Country: India
- State: Kerala
- District: Idukki

Languages
  - Official: Malayalam, English, Tamil
- Time zone: UTC+5:30 (IST)
- Postal code: 685 551
- ISO 3166 code: IN-KL
- Vehicle registration: KL-06 KL-37
- Coastline: 0 kilometres (0 mi)

Chittampara is a village in Idukki district, Kerala, India.

== Etymology ==
The name Chittampara or Chittanpara is derived from Sidhan’s Para (Sage’s rock), which seems to refer to a Sage doing penance in the area.

This area is famous for Cardamom plantations, quarries, etc. The public cemetery of Chakkupallam Panchayat is located adjacent to the Village Cremation ground of Tamil communities.

The famous Sidhi Vinayaka temple is a main attraction here.

== Sri Siddhi Vinayakar Temple ==
This temple located 1 km South West of Sulthankada is dedicated to Lord Vinayaka is 21 years old. Although located near the public cemetery of native Tamils, the temple attracts young people in the area.

During 1978, an elderly person who works as a Cardamom estate employee dreamt of an elephant calf running around near the area where the temple is currently located. But the other people did not take it seriously and ignored the same. Later a native of the area found an elephant shaped stone and installed the same on an erected place (Peettham). This murthy is worshipped as Yoga Ganapathi.

The temple did not attract many gatherings of devotees, but there were few devotees who used to visit the area frequently. In the Year 1989, a small Shrine was constructed and the deity of Sidhi Vinayakar installed. Although the Lord is Grihastha (supposed to be with His wife Sidhi), the deity of the Goddess is not installed. A beautiful deity of Ngarja is installed at His right and Karthikeya at His left side (in the form of Vel or Spear).

The grand Kumbhabhishekam was performed in the year 1991 by Vishveshwara Iyer from Chinnamannur. The main festivals in this temple are during Vinayaka jayanthi and Sabari Mala pooja days.

All the deity faces towards East. The Main Deity is Sidhi Vinayakar and other Deities are Yoga Ganapathi, Nagaraja, Bhavani Devi, Sri Sasthavu and many of the devotees feel the presence of Siva & Parvathi here.

Temple Tree is Pavizhamalli (Common name:Coral Jasmine, Tree of Sorrow, Queen of the night • Hindi: हार सिंगार Har singar, शैफ़ाली Shefali, पारिजात Paarijat • Manipuri: Singarei • Tamil: பவிழமல்லி Pavizhamalli • Malayalam: Paarijatam • Sanskrit: पारिजात Paarijatam Botanical name: Nyctanthes arbor-tristis Family: Oleaceae / Jasmine family) and there is a small theppakkulam situated near the temple. Currently this temple is managed by (including Pooja) by Mr C Jayaraj of Chittanpara.

== Nearby villages ==
Sulthankada is located 1 km northeast of Chittampara.
