= State Highway 44 (Kerala) =

Highway in Kerala, India

State Highway 44
- name
- SH 44 highlighted in red

Route information
- Maintained by Kerala Public Works Department
- Length: 152 km (94 mi)

Major junctions
- South end: SH 67 near Pampa
- SH 59 near Erumely; NH 183 near Kanjirappally; SH 32 in Erattupetta; SH 33 in Muttom; SH 8 / SH 40 / SH 41 in Thodupuzha; SH 43 in Perumamkandam
- North end: NH 85 near Neriamangalam

Location
- Country: India
- State: Kerala
- Districts: Pattanamtitta, Kottayam, Ernakulam, Idukki

Highway system
- Roads in India; Expressways; National; State; Asian; State Highways in Kerala
← SH 43	→ SH 45

State Highway 44 (SH 44) is a state highway in Kerala, India that starts in Pamba and ends in Neriyamangalam. The highway is 152 km long.

== Route map ==
Route map
- Pamba - Chalakkayam - Attathodu - Nilakkal - Naranamthodu - Thulappally - Pambavalley- Muttappally - Mukkoottuthara - Erumely - Koovappally - Kanjirappally - Anakkallu - Kappadu - Kalaketty - Pinnakkanadu - Chemmalamattam– Thidanadu – Erattupetta – Melukavu – Muttom – Thodupuzha – Paingottoor - Oonnukal - Neriyamangalam

== See also ==
- Roads in Kerala
- List of state highways in Kerala
