= State Highway 14 (Kerala) =

Highway in Kerala, India

State Highway 14
- Erattupetta - Peermadu Road
- SH 14 highlighted in red

Route information
- Maintained by Kerala Public Works Department
- Length: 24.3 km (15.1 mi)

Major junctions
- West end: SH 32 in Erattupetta
- East end: SH 59 in Elappara

Location
- Country: India
- State: Kerala
- Districts: Kottayam, Idukki

Highway system
- Roads in India; Expressways; National; State; Asian; State Highways in Kerala
← SH 12	→ SH 15

State Highway 14 (SH 14) is a state highway in Kerala that starts from Erattupetta and ends at Pattithanam junction. The highway is 24.3 km (15.1 mi) long.

== Route description ==
Erattupetta -Teekoy- Vellikulam - Vagamon - Road joins with Pullikkanam Elappara road - Pattithanam junction

== See also ==
- Roads in Kerala
- List of state highways in Kerala
