= State Highway 32 (Kerala) =

Highway in Kerala, India

State Highway 32
- Ettumanoor – Erattupetta – Poonjar road
- SH 32 highlighted in red

Route information
- Maintained by Kerala Public Works Department
- Length: 37.9 km (23.5 mi)

Major junctions
- West end: Athirampuzha
- SH 1 in Ettumanoor; SH 8 in Pala; SH 44 / SH 14 in Erattupetta
- East end: in Poonjar

Location
- Country: India
- State: Kerala
- Districts: Kottayam

Highway system
- Roads in India; Expressways; National; State; Asian; State Highways in Kerala
← SH 31	→ SH 33

State Highway 32 (SH 32) is a state highway in Kerala, India that starts in Athirampuzha and ends in Poonjar. The highway is 37.9 km long.

== Route map ==
Athirampuzha landing – SH-1 crosses – Ettumanoor – Kidangoor – Cherpunkal – Mutholy – SH-03 crosses and overlaps – Pala Market – Bharananganam town – Erattupetta town – Poonjar.

== See also ==
- Roads in Kerala
- List of state highways in Kerala
