= State Highway 18 (Kerala) =

Highway in Kerala, India

State Highway 18
- Munnar - Top station road
- SH 18 highlighted in red

Route information
- Maintained by Kerala Public Works Department
- Length: 32.1 km (19.9 mi)

Major junctions
- East end: NH 85 in Munnar
- West end: Top Station

Location
- Country: India
- State: Kerala
- Districts: Idukki

Highway system
- Roads in India; Expressways; National; State; Asian; State Highways in Kerala
← SH 17	→ SH 19

State Highway 18 (SH 18) is a state highway in Kerala that starts from Munnar and ends at the Kerala State Boundary. The highway is 32.1 km long.

== Route map ==
Munnar (starts from km 113/6 of Aluva - Munnar road) - Mattupetty Dam - Indo Swiss Project Gate - Top Station - State boundary - Road continues to Tamil Nadu as part of Kodaikanal–Munnar Road

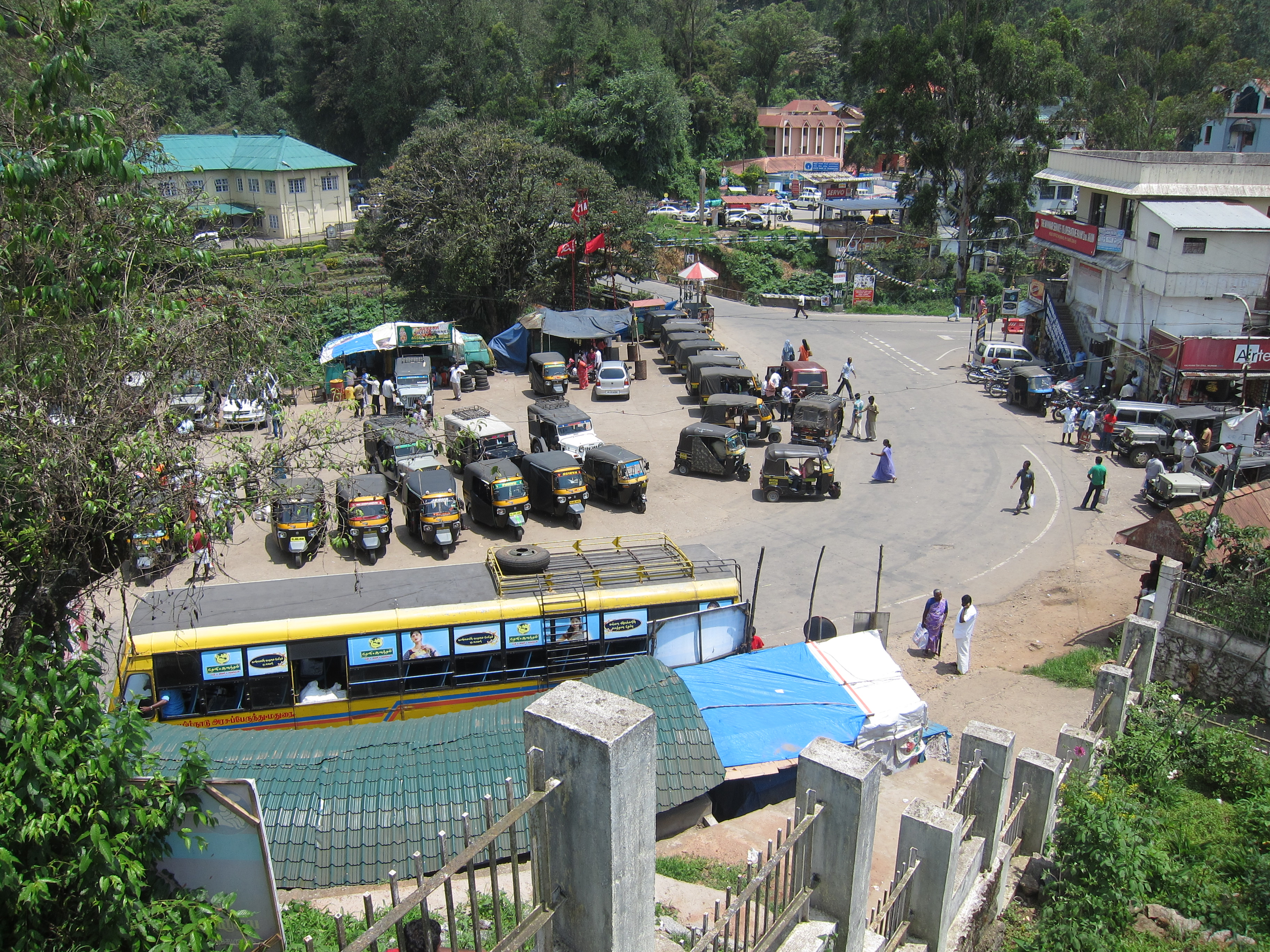
Junction with NH 85. East end SH 18 on the right

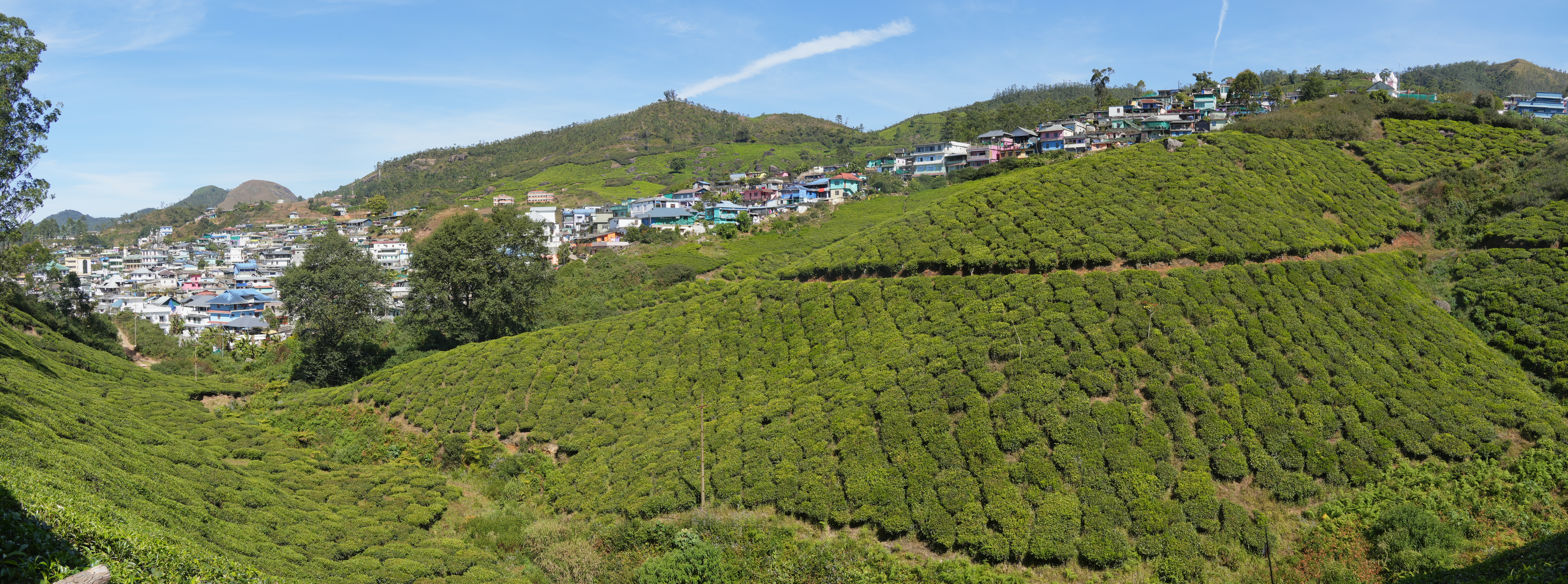
View from near the western end

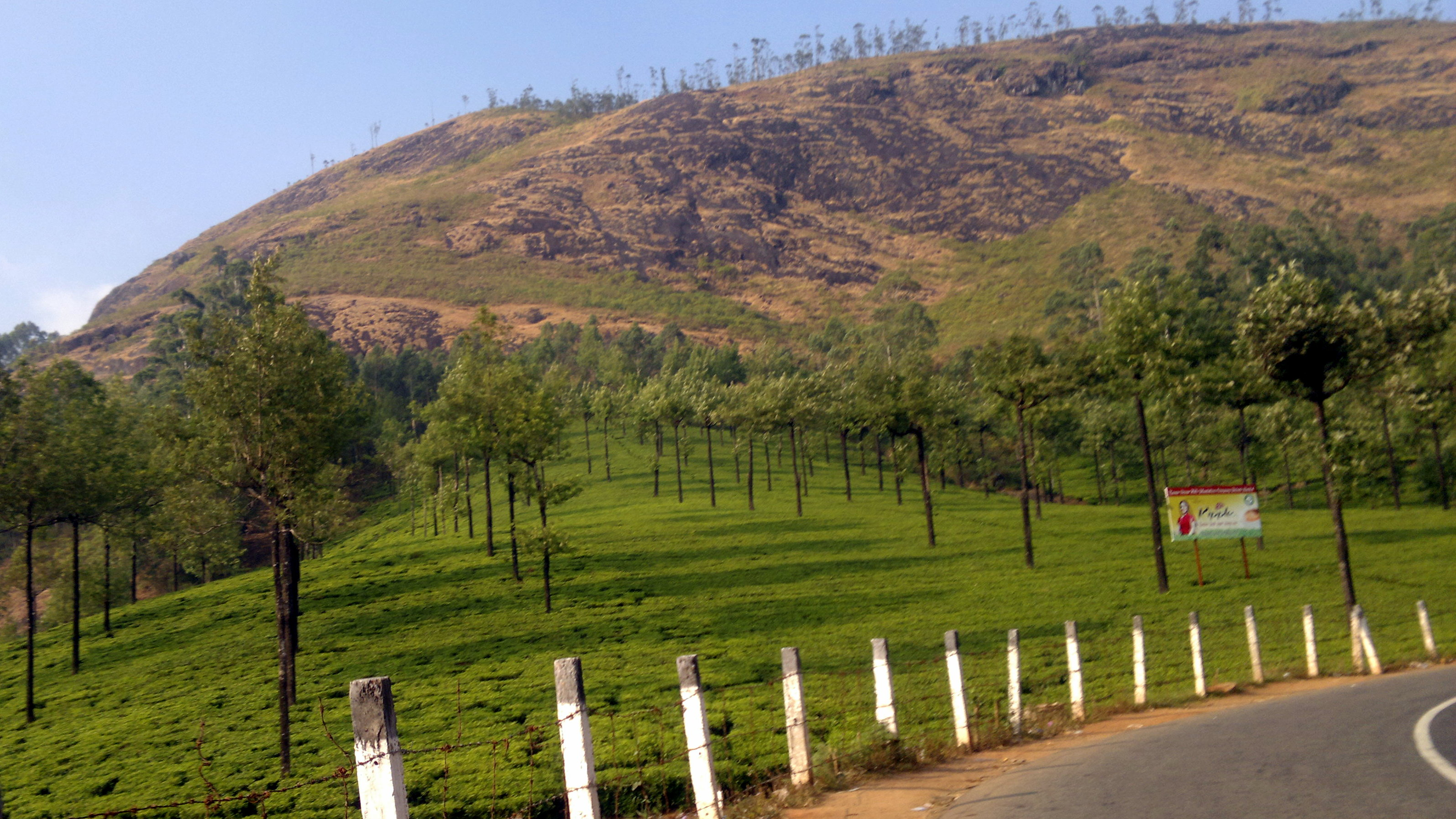
SH 18 with tea pantation famous view spot in Munnar town

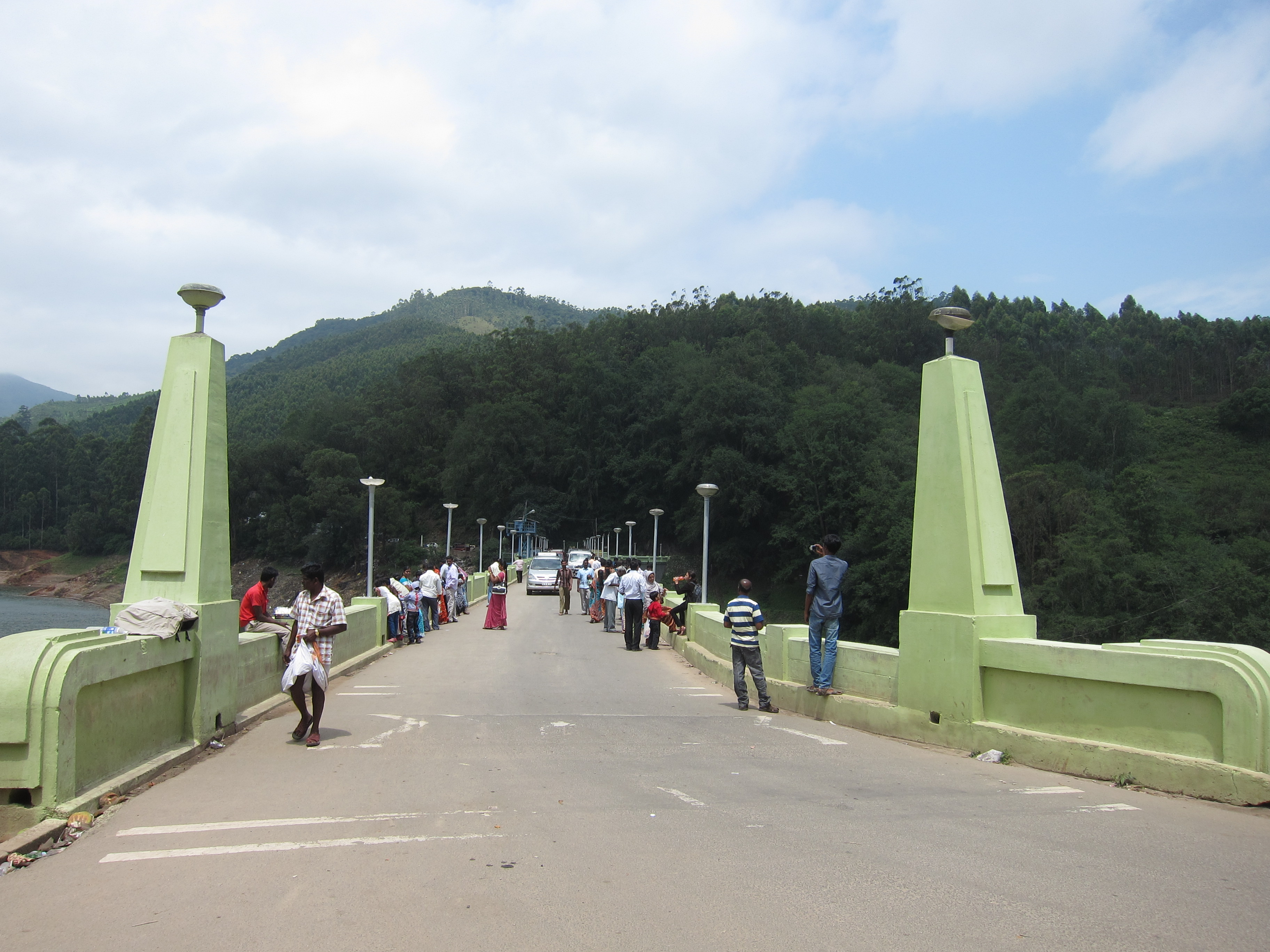
SH 18 through Mattupetty Dam crest

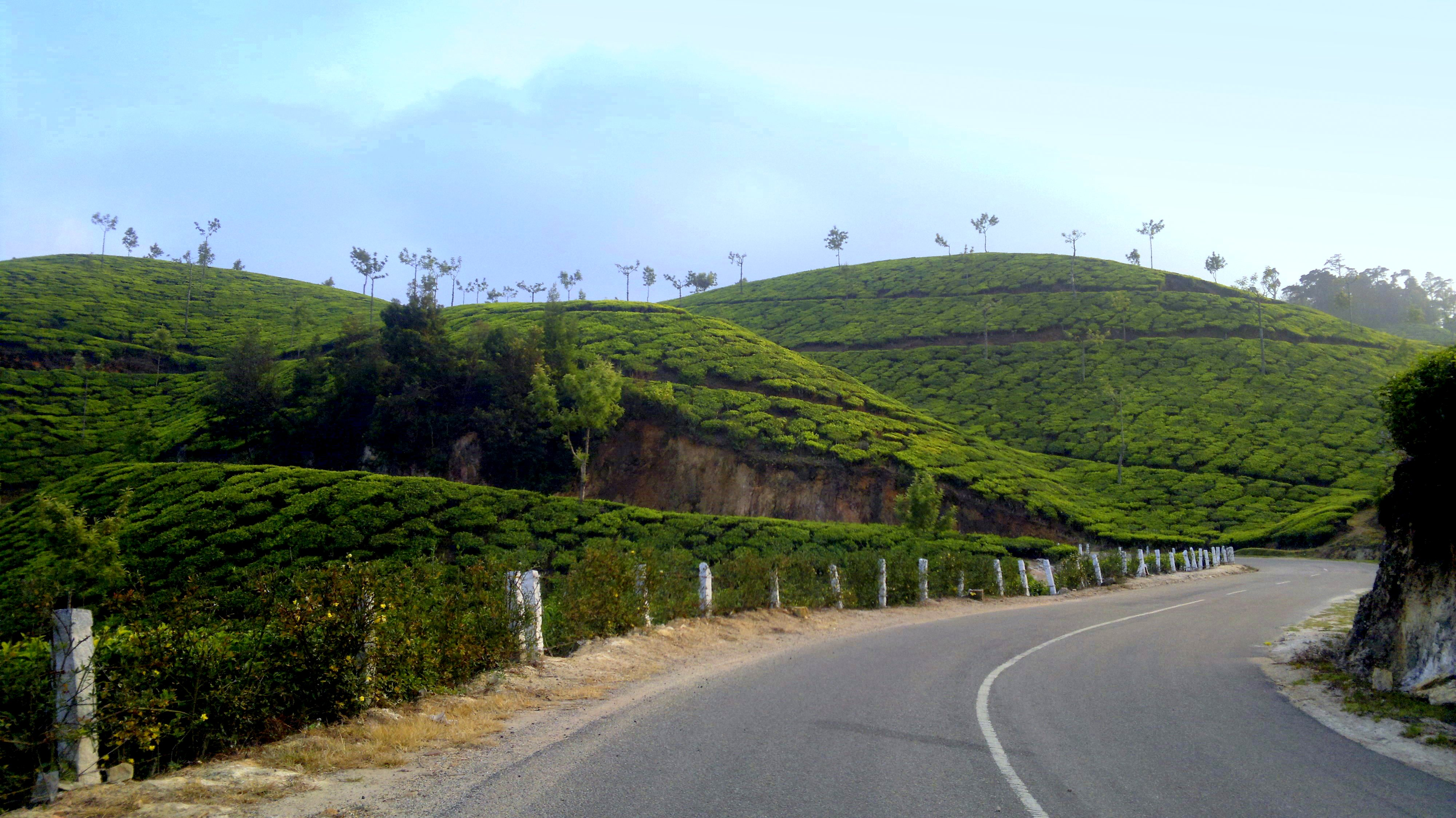
Scenery near the eastern end

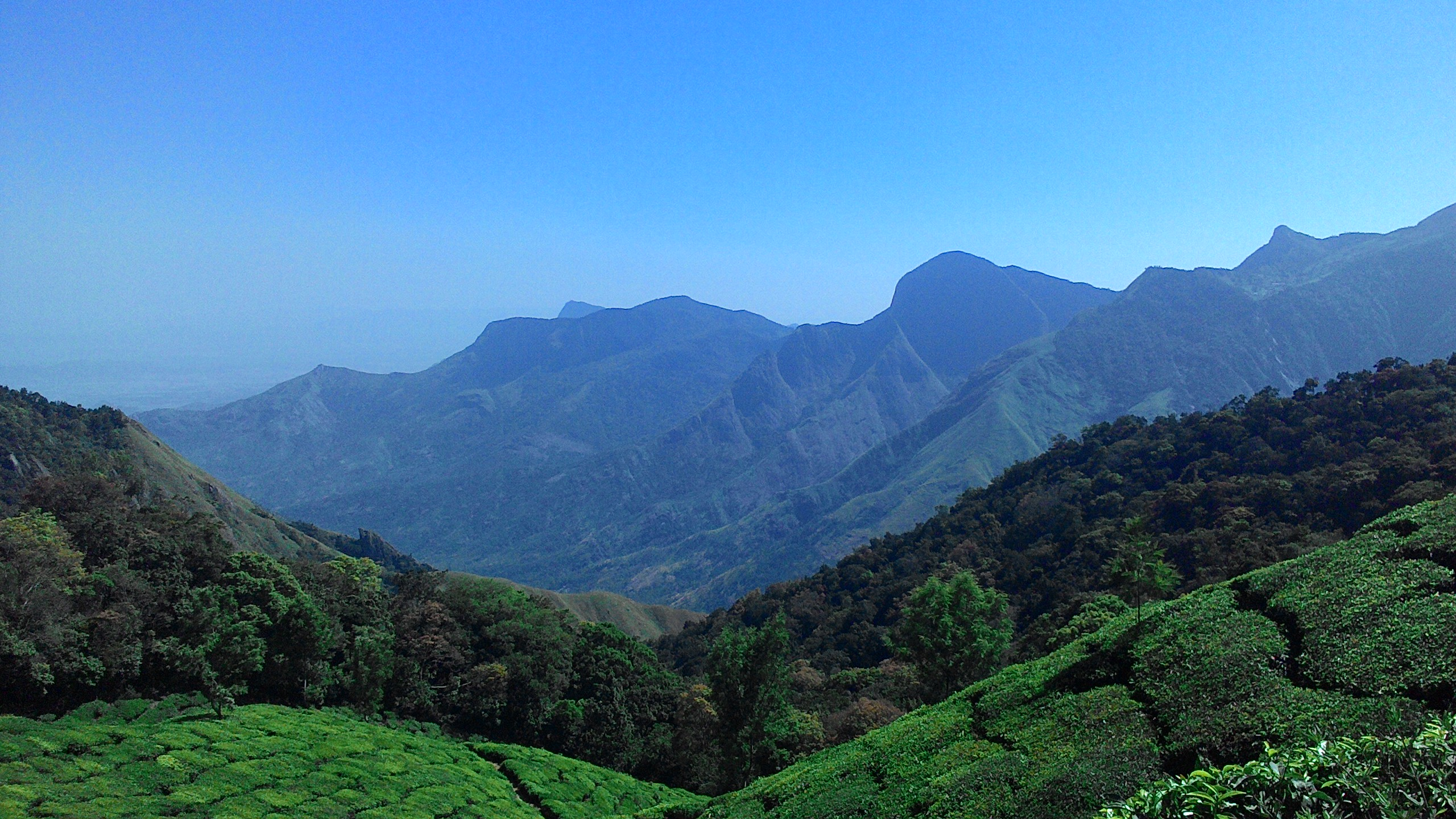
View from SH 18 near the eastern end

== See also ==
- Roads in Kerala
- List of state highways in Kerala
