= Kalvary Mount =

Tourist spot and pilgrimage centre in India

Kalvary Mount Calvary Mount (Pathammailu)
- Hill Station
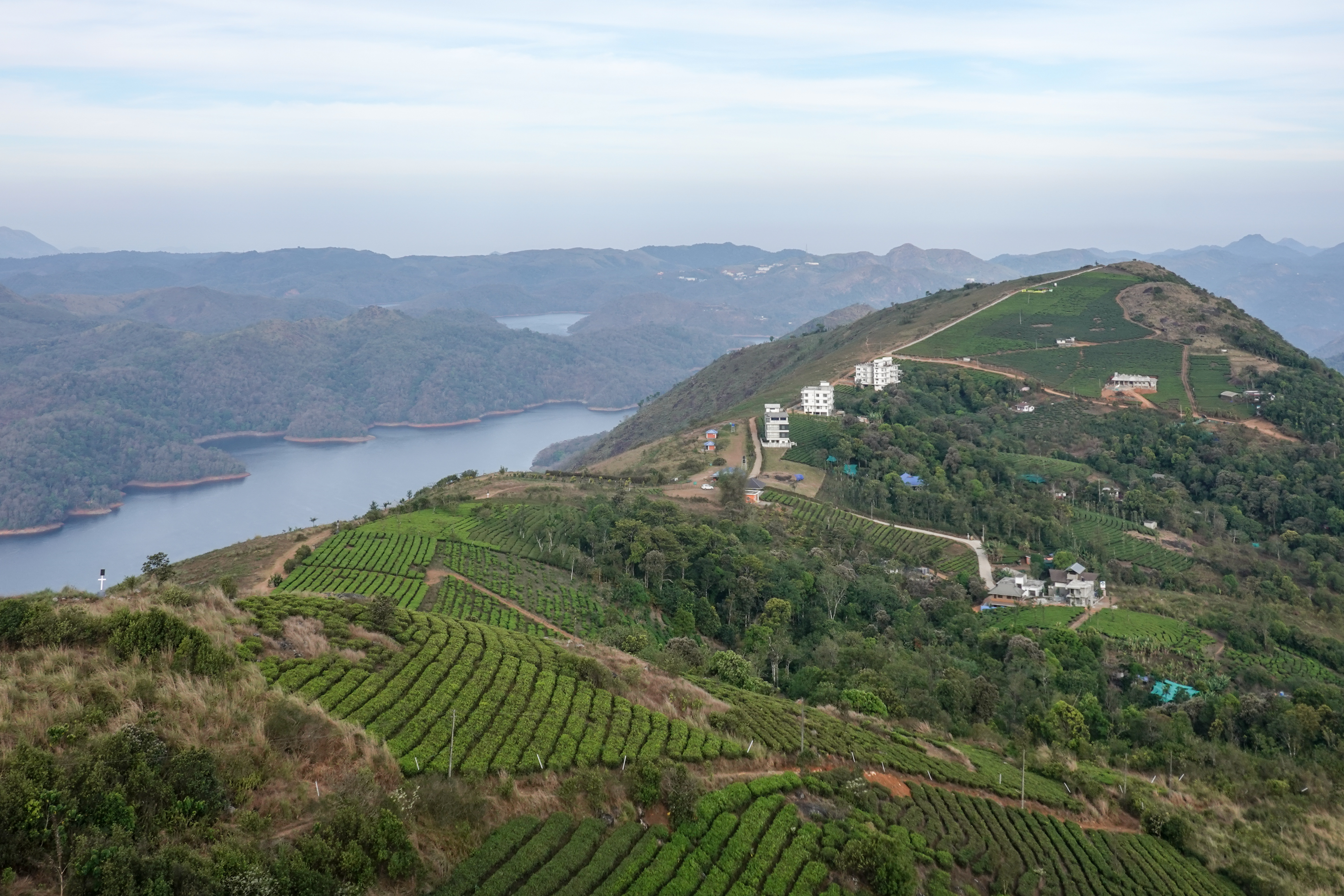

- Location in Kerala, India Kalvary Mount (India)
- Coordinates: 09°49′07.6″N 77°01′27.8″E
- Country: India
- State: Kerala
- District: Idukki

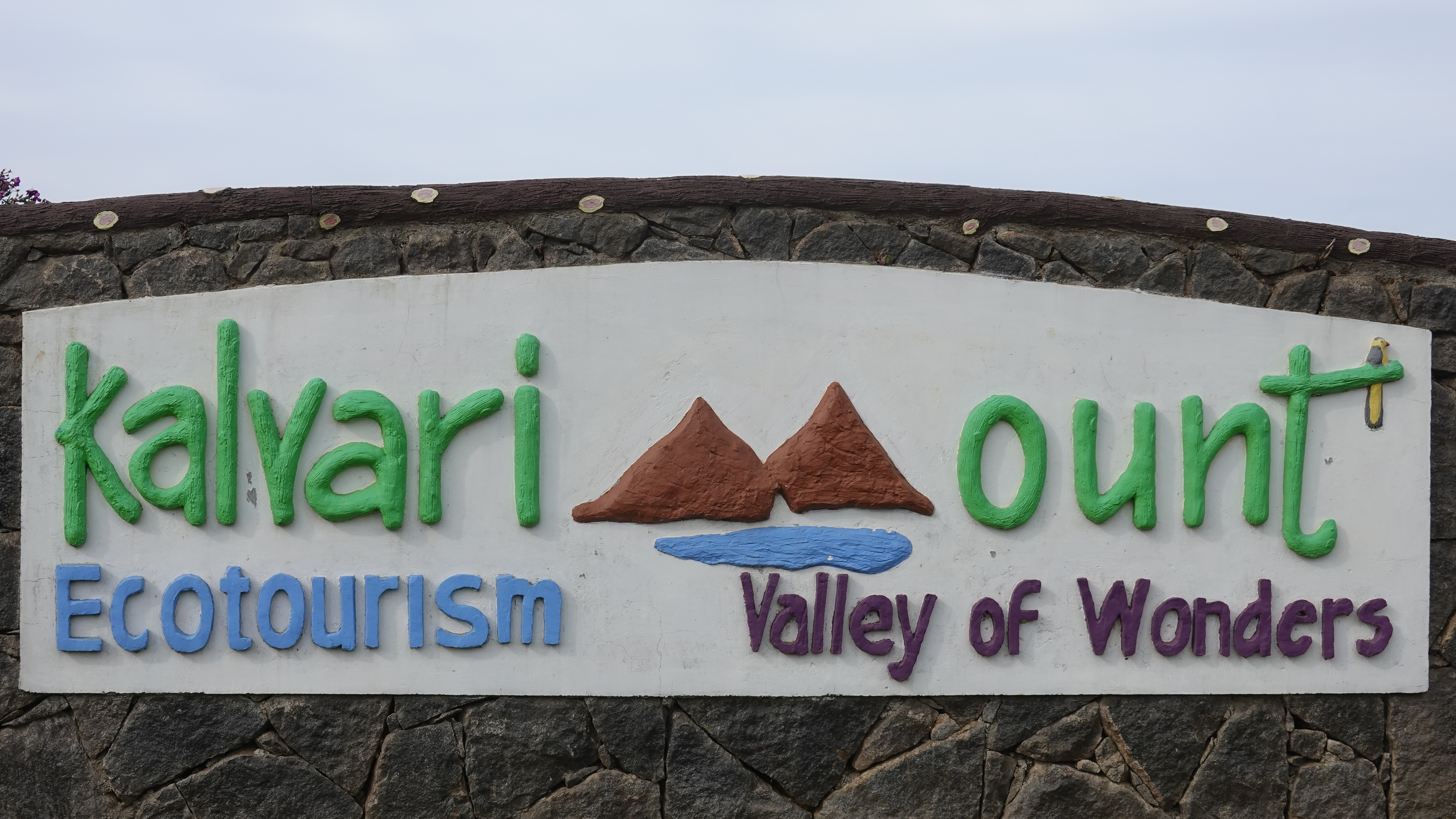
Info board of Kerala Tourism

Kalvary Mount (Calvary Mount), also known as Kalyanathandu or Pathammailu, is a prominent hillock situated in the Idukki district of Kerala, India. Standing at an approximate elevation of 200 meters, it holds significance for both religious and nature enthusiasts. It is a Christian pilgrimage site perched atop a hill offers that an aerial view of the Idukki Reservoir and its surrounding peaks and forests.

Once a secluded spot, it gained fame after the Idukki Dam's construction.

During Lent, the area turns into a pilgrimage centre as Christians go in a procession up the hillock.

The tourist destination is close to other tourist spots of the district like Idukki dam, and Hill View Park.

== Religious significance ==
Calvary Mount is a designated Christian pilgrimage site. The name itself refers to the biblical Mount Calvary, the site of the Crucifixion of Jesus. During the Christian season of Lent, the area becomes a pilgrimage centre, where devotees undertake a processional ascent up the hillock.

== Tourist attractions ==
=== Idukki Reservoir View Point ===
Calvary Mount offers a panoramic vista of the surrounding region, including the Idukki Reservoir. On a clear day, the villages of Kamakshi and Mariyapuram can be seen amidst the hills.

=== Trekking ===
Calvary Mount attracts adventure enthusiasts with what is said to be a "moderately challenging trekking trail". Before ascending, a moderate level of fitness is recommended due to the incline of the trail.

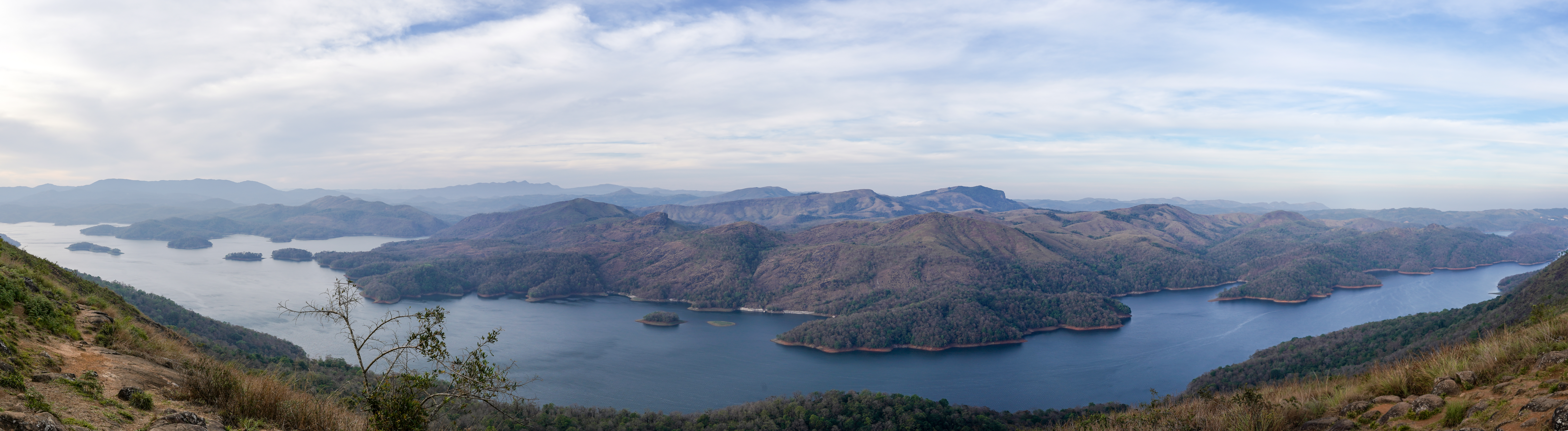
Viewed from Kalvary Mount

== Location ==
Calvary Mount is accessible by road. It is located approximately 10 kilometers from Idukki town and can be reached via the Thodupuzha-Puliyanmala highway. Public transportation options are available from Idukki and Kattappana .The distance from Kattappana is 15 km. Alighting at the 10th mile or Calvary Mount junction allows for a hike to the viewpoint. There's an entry fee of ₹20 to visit.

== Nearby towns ==
- Kattappana
- Painavu

== See also ==
- Kattappana
- Idukki
- Painavu
- Kumily
