= Cherkala =

Town in Kerala, India

Coordinates: 12.509°N 75.054°E

Cherkala also named CKL is a town located in the Kasaragod district of the Indian state of Kerala. It is located about 7 kilometres (4.3 mi) east of Kasaragod, the second city of kasaragod at the intersection of National Highway 66, State Highway 31, and State Highway 55. Attractions in and around Cherkala include the Thooku Paalam bridge, which crosses the Chandragiri River, and the forest of the nearby village of Paika. The L.B.S College of Engineering is located nearby.
