= Idukki Assembly constituency =

Constituency of the Kerala legislative assembly in India

Idukki
- Constituency No. 91 for the Kerala Legislative Assembly
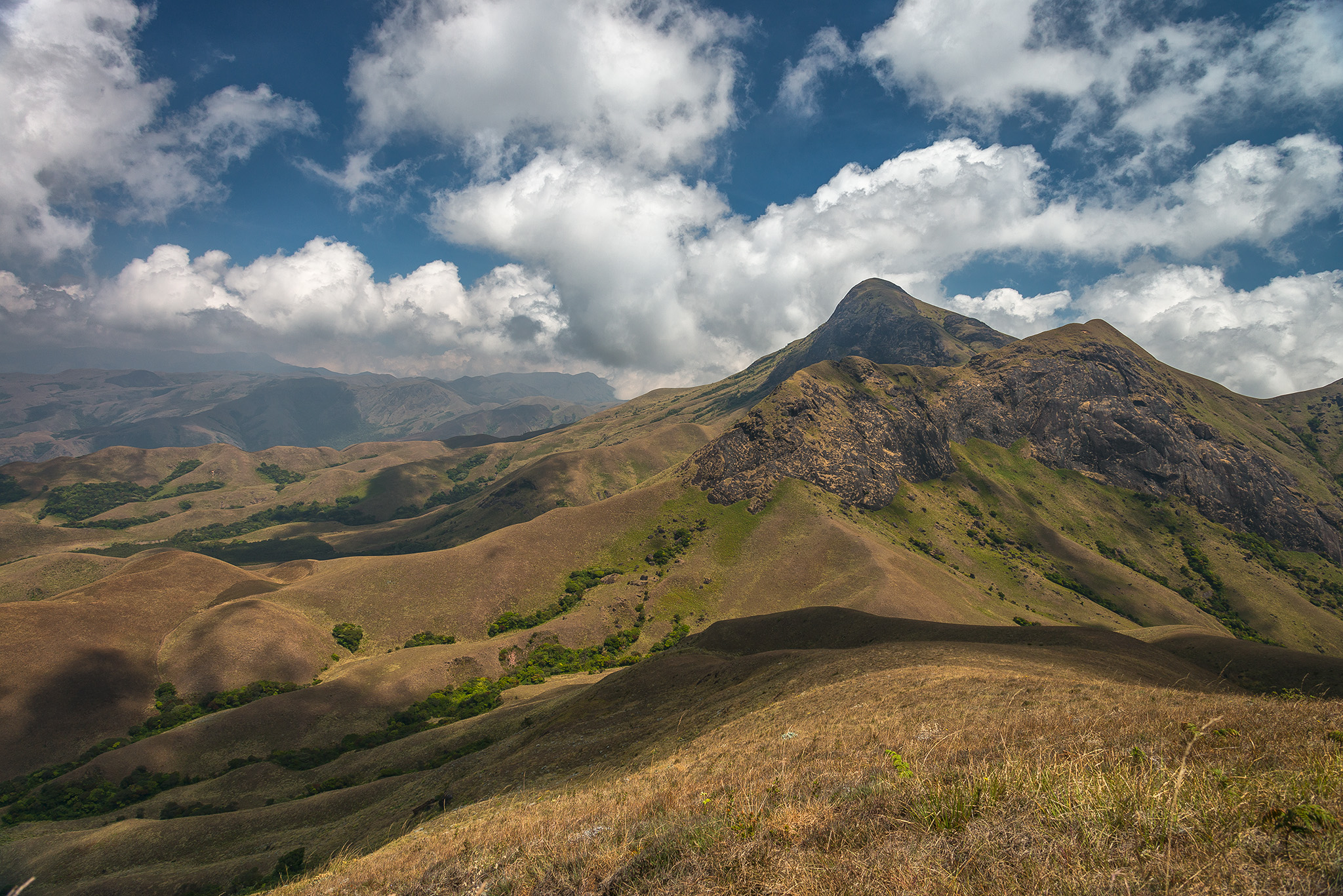
- Anamudi in Idukki district is the highest peak on Western Ghats and South India.

Constituency details
- Country: India
- Region: South India
- State: Kerala
- District: Idukki
- Established: 1977
- Total electors: 1,84,218 (2016)
- Reservation: None

Member of Legislative Assembly
- 16th Kerala Legislative Assembly
- Incumbent Roy K Paulose
- Party: Indian National Congress
- Alliance: UDF
- Elected year: 2026

Idukki State assembly constituency is one of the 140 state legislative assembly constituencies in Kerala in southern India. It is also one of the seven state legislative assembly constituencies included in Idukki Lok Sabha constituency.

== Local self-governed segments ==
Idukki Assembly constituency is composed of the following local self-governed segments:

Sl no.	Name	Status (Grama panchayat/Municipality)	Taluk
1	Kattappana	Municipality	Idukki
2	Idukki-Kanjikuzhy	Grama panchayat	Idukki
3	Vazhathope	Grama panchayat	Idukki
4	Kamakshy	Grama panchayat	Idukki
5	Kanchiyar	Grama panchayat	Idukki
6	Konnathady	Grama panchayat	Idukki
7	Mariapuram	Grama panchayat	Idukki
8	Vathikudy	Grama panchayat	Idukki
9	Arakkulam	Grama panchayat	Thodupuzha
10	Kudayathoor	Grama panchayat	Thodupuzha

== Members of the Legislative Assembly ==
The following list contains all members of the Kerala Legislative Assembly who have represented the constituency:

Key

INC(I) INC JD KC(M)

Election	Niyama Sabha	Member	Party	Tenure
1977	5th	V. T. Sebastian	Kerala Congress	1977 – 1980
1980	6th	Jose Kuttyani	Indian National Congress	1980 – 1982
1982	7th	Jose Kuttyani	INC	1982 – 1987
1987	8th	Rosamma Chacko	INC	1987 – 1991
1991	9th	Mathew Stephen	Kerala Congress	1991 – 1996
1996	10th	P. P. Sulaiman Rawther	Janata Dal	1996 – 2001
2001	11th	Roshy Augustine	KC(M)	2001 – 2006
2006	12th	Roshy Augustine	KC(M)	2006 – 2011
2011	13th	Roshy Augustine	KC(M)	2011 – 2016
2016	14th	Roshy Augustine	KC(M)	2016-2021
2021	15th	Roshy Augustine	KC(M)	2021–2026
2026	16th	Roy K Paulose	Indian National Congress	2026 – 2031

== Election results ==
Percentage change (±%) denotes the change in the number of votes from the immediately previous election.

=== 2026 ===
2026 Kerala Legislative Assembly election: Idukki
Party	Candidate	Votes	%	±%
INC	Roy K Paulose	70,562	54.93	▲11.88
KC(M)	Roshy Augustine	46,740	36.39	▼12.33
BDJS	Adv. Pratheesh Prabha	9,410	7.33	▲0.44
BSP	Shijo Antony	977	0.76	▼0.34
NOTA	None of the Above	758	0.59	▼2.36
Margin of victory		23822	18.54	▲4.62
Turnout		128447		
INC gain from KC(M)		Swing	▲4.62	

=== 2021 ===
There were 1,86,503 registered voters in the constituency for the 2021 Kerala Assembly election.

2021 Kerala Legislative Assembly election: Idukki
Party	Candidate	Votes	%	±%
KC(M)	Roshy Augustine	62,368	47.48	▲4.62
KEC	K. Francis George	56,795	43.24	▲6.98
BDJS	Sangeetha Viswanathan	9148	7.07	▼12.33
BSP	Babu Varghese Vattoli	1,106	0.84	▲0.44
NOTA	None of the above	677	0.52	▼0.34
Independent	Bijeesh Thomas	610	0.46	−
Independent	Vincent Jacob	340	0.26	−
Margin of victory		5,573	4.24	▼2.36
Turnout		1,31,737	70.64	
LDF gain from UDF		Swing		

=== 2016 ===
There were 1,84,218 registered voters in the constituency for the 2016 Kerala Assembly election.

2016 Kerala Legislative Assembly election: Idukki
Party	Candidate	Votes	%	±%
KC(M)	Roshy Augustine	60,556	42.86	▼12.02
JKC	K. Francis George	50,758	36.26	−
BDJS	Biju Madhavan	27,403	19.40	−
BSP	Sabu Kochuparambil	566	0.40	−
Independent	P. T. Poomkudy	436	0.31	−
NOTA	None of the above	433	0.86	−
SDPI	Babu Kozhimala	411	0.29	−
Independent	Idukki Ravi	250	0.18	−
Margin of victory		9,323	6.60	▼6.59
Turnout		1,41,278	76.69	▲6.23
KC(M) hold		Swing	▼12.02	

=== 2011 ===
There were 1,69,984 registered voters in the constituency for the 2011 election.

2011 Kerala Legislative Assembly election: Idukki
Party	Candidate	Votes	%	±%
KC(M)	Roshy Augustine	65,734	54.88	
CPI(M)	C. V. Varghese	49,928	41.69	
BJP	C. C. Krishnan	3,013	2.52	
Independent	Kanchiyar Peethambaran	389	0.32	
Independent	M. K. Narayanan	226	0.19	▲0.38
Independent	V. Lakshmanan	158	0.13	−
Margin of victory		15,806	13.19	
Turnout		1,19,773	70.46	
KC(M) hold		Swing		

== See also ==
- Kattappana
- Idukki district
- List of constituencies of the Kerala Legislative Assembly
- 2016 Kerala Legislative Assembly election
