= State Highway 55 (Kerala) =

Highway in Kerala, India

State Highway 55
- Cherkala – Jalsoor Road
- SH 55 highlighted in red

Route information
- Maintained by Kerala Public Works Department
- Length: 39.1 km (24.3 mi)

Major junctions
- West end: NH 66 in Cherkala
- East end: Karnataka border near Jalsoor

Location
- Country: India
- State: Kerala
- Districts: Kasaragod

Highway system
- Roads in India; Expressways; National; State; Asian; State Highways in Kerala
← SH 54	→ SH 56

State Highway 55 (SH 55) is a state highway in Kerala, India that starts in Cherkala and ends in Panjikal. The highway is 39.1 km long.

== Route map ==
Cherkala junction (Km 58/0 of NH 17) – Mulleria – Adhur – Kotyadi - Panjikal

== See also ==
- Roads in Kerala
- List of state highways in Kerala
