= Roy K. Paulose =

Indian politician from Kerala

Roy Kooruvelil Paulose

Member of the Kerala Legislative Assembly
- Incumbent
- Assumed office 21 May 2026
- Preceded by: Roshy Augustine
- Constituency: Idukki

Personal details
- Party: Indian National Congress
- Profession: Politician

Roy K. Paulose is an Indian politician from Kerala and a member of the Indian National Congress. He was elected to the Kerala Legislative Assembly from the Idukki Assembly constituency in the 2026 Kerala Legislative Assembly election.

== Political career ==
Roy K. Paulose contested the 2026 Kerala Legislative Assembly election from Idukki constituency as a candidate of the Indian National Congress, part of the United Democratic Front (UDF).

He won the election by defeating Roshy Augustine of Kerala Congress (M) by a margin of 23,822 votes.

His victory was part of a wider electoral shift in Kerala in 2026, in which several leaders of Kerala Congress (M), including Roshy Augustine, were defeated.

== Electoral performance ==
=== 2026 Kerala Legislative Assembly election ===
Idukki Assembly constituency (91)
Party	Candidate	Votes	Margin
Indian National Congress	Roy K. Paulose	70,562	+23,822
Kerala Congress (M)	Roshy Augustine	46,740	−23,822
Bharath Dharma Jana Sena	Adv. Pratheesh Prabha	9,410	−61,152
Bahujan Samaj Party	Shijo Antony	977	−69,585
NOTA	None of the Above	758	−69,804
