= State Highway 31 (Kerala) =

Highway in Kerala, India

State Highway 31
- Kalladka - Cherkala Road
- SH 31 highlighted in red

Route information
- Maintained by Kerala Public Works Department
- Length: 28.9 km (18.0 mi)

Major junctions
- North end: SH 64 at KA border in Adkasthala
- South end: NH 66 in Cherkala

Location
- Country: India
- State: Kerala
- Districts: Kasaragod

Highway system
- Roads in India; Expressways; National; State; Asian; State Highways in Kerala
← SH 30	→ SH 32

State Highway 31 (SH 31) is a state highway in Kerala, India that starts in Cherkala and ends at the state boundary at Adkasthala near Perla. The highway is 28.8 kilometres (17.9 mi) long.

== Route map ==
Cherkala (NH17) - Badiadka town - SPP Road joins - Perla town - Adakasthala - State border

== See also ==
- Roads in Kerala
- List of state highways in Kerala
