= Rosamma Chacko =

Indian politician (1927–2019)

Member of the Kerala Legislative Assembly
- In office 1987–2001
- Constituency: Idukki (1987–1991); Chalakudy (1991–1996); Manalur (1996–2001)

Personal details
- Born: 17 March 1927
- Died: 14 March 2019 (aged 91)
- Political party: Indian National Congress

Rosamma Chacko (17 March 1927 – 14 March 2019) was an Indian National Congress politician from Kerala. She was thrice a member of the Kerala Legislative Assembly, each time from a different constituency.

== Early life ==
Rosamma Chacko was born on 17 March 1927 to C. Chacko and Mariamma Chacko. She held degrees in Hindi language and literature.

== Career ==
Chacko was a member of the Indian National Congress (INC) party and was included in the executive committee of Kerala Pradesh Congress Committee in 1956. From 1960 to 1963, she served as its president. She was also a member of the Standing Committee of All India Women's Conference and vice-president of Indian Red Cross Society beside being the chairperson of the Social Welfare Board.

During the 1987 Kerala Legislative Assembly election for the Eighth state assembly, she stood and won from the Idukki as an official candidate of the INC. She was re-elected in 1991 and 1996 from Chalakkudy and Manalur respectively. She served on the legislative committee for Welfare of Women and Children (1992–1993), (1993–1995) and (1995–1996).
