= Roshy Augustine =

Indian politician from Kerala

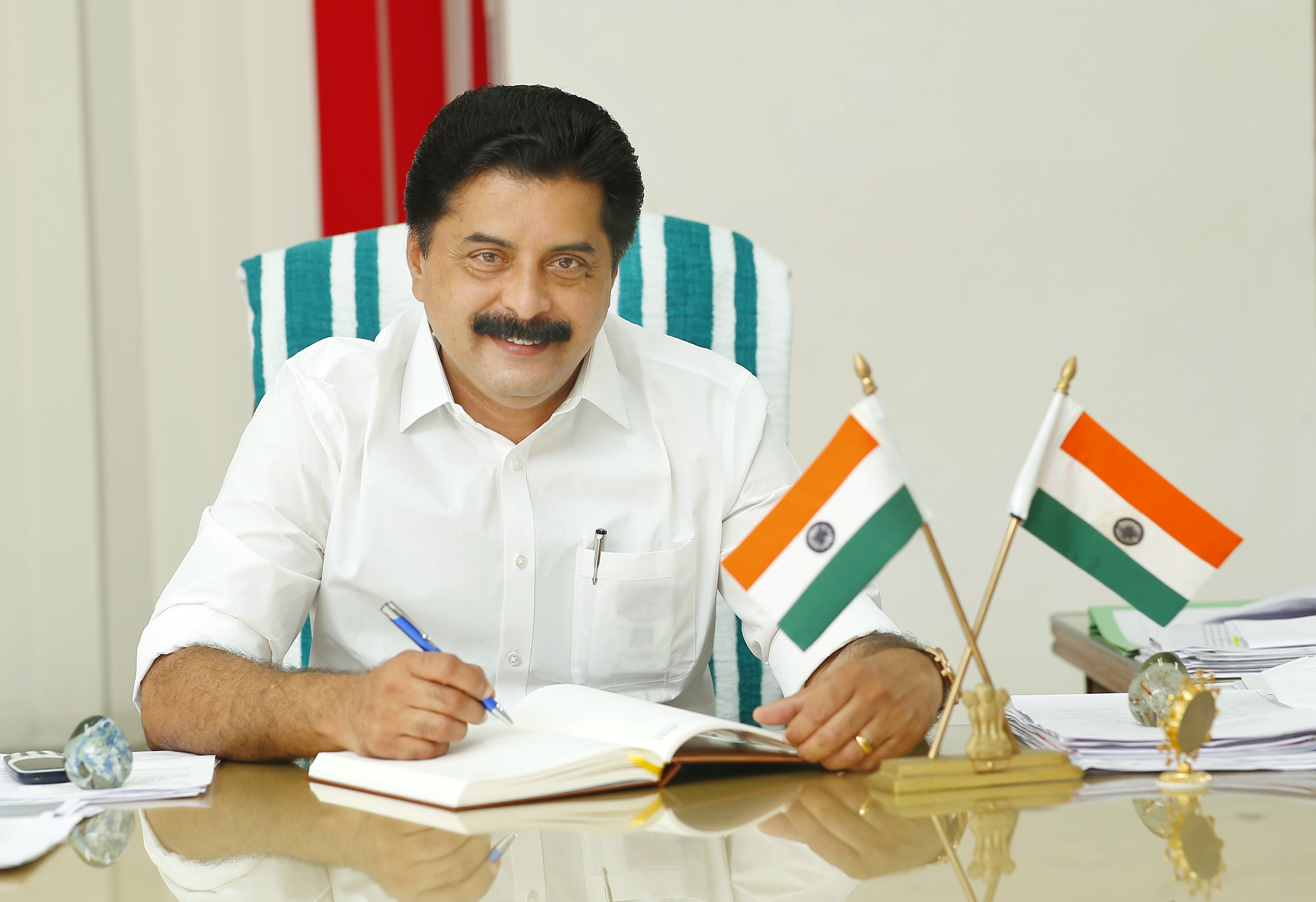

Minister for Water Resources, Government of Kerala
- In office 20 May 2021 – 23 May 2026
- Chief Minister: Pinarayi Vijayan
- Departments: Water Resources
- Portfolios: List: Irrigation; Command Area Development Authority; Ground Water Department; Water Supply and Sanitation
- Preceded by: K. Krishnankutty
- Succeeded by: Mons Joseph

Former Member of Kerala Legislative Assembly
- In office 20 May 2001 – 21 May 2026
- Preceded by: P. P. Sulaiman Rawther
- Succeeded by: Roy K Paulose
- Constituency: Idukki

Personal details
- Born: 20 January 1969 (age 57) Pala
- Party: Kerala Congress (M)
- Spouse: Rani Thomas
- Children: 3

Roshy Augustine (born 20 May 1969) is an Indian politician who has served as the Minister for Water Resources of Kerala from 2021 to 2026. He was a Member of the Kerala Legislative Assembly representing Idukki from 2001 to 2026. He is a member of the Kerala Congress (M) party.

== Personal life ==
He was born to Leelamma and Augustine Thomas of the Cherunilathuchalil House In A Syrian Catholic Family on 20 January 1969 at Pala. He started his political career from his school level. He was the leader of Edakkoli Government High School Parliament, Unit President of Kerala Students Congress (M) in St. Thomas College, Pala, state general secretary and president of Kerala Students Congress (M), member of Kerala State Legal Aid and Advisory Board and director board member of Ramapuram Service Co-Operative Bank. Currently, he is the general secretary of Kerala Congress (M).

== Political career ==
Roshy Augustine entered politics while he was still a student and soon became the leader of the Edakkoli Government High School Parliament. He graduated with a BSc Physics from St. Thomas College, Pala, affiliated to Mahatma Gandhi University, during 1990–93. He held different positions in Kerala Students Congress (M) such as College Unit President, St. Thomas College, Pala; State General Secretary and President of KSC(M); Member of the Kerala State Legal Aid and Advisory Board; and Director Board Member of Ramapuram Service Co-operative Bank.

In the 1996 Kerala Assembly elections, he contested from the Perambra Assembly constituency but was defeated. His notable political activities include the ‘Vimochana Padayathra,’ in which he led a 43-day rally from Kasaragod to Thiruvananthapuram in 1995, and the ‘Vimochana Yatra’ in 2001 to raise awareness among the people of Kerala against corruption, alcoholism, and moral degeneration. He has served as Minister for Irrigation, Command Area Development Authority, Ground Water Department, and Water Supply in the Government of Kerala.

, in the Pinarayi Vijayan Government since 20 May 2021.

=== Assembly election candidature history ===
Year	Constituency	Political front	Opponent	Result	Margin
2001	Idukki	UDF	M S Joseph (Ind)	Won	13,719
2006	Idukki	UDF	C. V. Varghese (CPI(M))	Won	16,340
2011	Idukki	UDF	C. V. Varghese (CPI(M))	Won	15,806
2016	Idukki	UDF	Adv. K. Francis George (Ind)	Won	9,333
2021	Idukki	LDF	Adv. K. Francis George (KC(J))	Won	5,573
2026	Idukki	LDF	Roy K Paulose (INC)	Lost	23,822
