= Pattithanam =

- village
- Interactive map of Pattithanam
- Coordinates: 9°42′0″N 76°32′0″E
- Country: India
- State: Kerala
- District: Kottayam

Languages
- Time zone: UTC+5:30 (IST)
- PIN: 686631
- Vehicle registration: KL-67
- Nearest city: Kochi (Ernakulam)
- Lok Sabha constituency: Kottayam
- Niyamasabha constituency: Kaduthuruthy

Pattithanam is a village near Ettumanoor in the Kottayam District of Kerala, India. The name 'Pattithanam' is believed to be given by the Portuguese traders, who were looking for an ideal spot to build a church (St.Boniface Church). Pattithanam(Pattia Sthanam) means ideal place in Malayalam. Pattithanam village is the point of highest altitude on Main Central Road (MC Road). The early settlers in Pattithanam played a major role in establishing the educational and religious institutions in this area. During the early days, the nearest market was Athirampuzha and the agricultural produce was taken by bullock cart and head load from Pattithanm on market days. Pattithanam village is within Meenachil and Kottayam taluks of Kottayam District of Kerala.

== Facilities ==
- Churches: Saint Boniface Church, St. Thomas Church, Ettumanoor Brethren Church,
- Convent:St.Alphonsa Convent
- Schools: St. Boniface UP School, Pattithanam. Alphonsa English Medium School, Town U.P. School and Ebenezer international School.
- Eateries:- Mutappallil Fresh Juice (PH33+PX4, MC Rd, Kanakkary, Kerala 686631)

== Distance from places ==
- Kottayam 13 kilometres (8.1 mi)
- Ettumanoor 3 kilometres (1.9 mi)
- Palai (Pala) 15 kilometres (9.3 mi)
- Kanakkari 1 kilometre (0.62 mi)
- Ernakulam 60 kilometres (37 mi)
- Perumbavoor 60 kilometres (37 mi)
- Trivandrum 175 kilometres (109 mi)

== Transportation ==
The Main Central Road (state highway 1) passes through the village. It is also known for the sharp curves due to the ghat section, and the much delayed Kerala State Transport Project is expected to give some relief from this. State Highway 14 and State Highway 15 start from Pattithanam Junction.
