= State Highway 12 (Kerala) =

Road in Kerala, India

State Highway 12
- Ambalapuzha - Thiruvalla Road
- SH 12 highlighted in red

Route information
- Maintained by Kerala Public Works Department
- Length: 27.2 km (16.9 mi)

Major junctions
- West end: NH 66 in Ambalapuzha
- SH 6 near Thiruvalla
- East end: NH 183 / SH 1 in Thiruvalla

Location
- Country: India
- State: Kerala
- Districts: Alappuzha, Pathanamthitta

Highway system
- Roads in India; Expressways; National; State; Asian; State Highways in Kerala
← SH 11	→ SH 13

State Highway 12 (SH 12) is a state highway in Kerala, India that starts in Ambalapuzha and ends in Thiruvalla. The highway is 27.2 km long.

== Route description ==
Ambalapuzha (NH 47) - Thakazhy - Edathua - Thalavady - Podiyadi junction (Kayamkulam - Thiruvalla Highway SH 06) joins - Thiruvalla (MC Road)

== See also ==
- Roads in Kerala
- List of state highways in Kerala
