= National Highway 185 (India) =

Highway in India

National Highway 185
- Map of the National Highway in red

Route information
- Length: 98 km (61 mi)

Major junctions
- North end: Adimali
- South end: Kumily

Location
- Country: India
- States: Kerala

Highway system
- Roads in India; Expressways; National; State; Asian
← NH 85	→ NH 183

National Highway 185 (NH 185) is a highway in India running from Adimali to Kumily through KattappanaAnavilasam and ends in kumily Attapallam Village in Kerala.

== Route ==
Adimali - Cheruthoni - Kattappana - Anavilasom - Kumily.

== Junctions ==
NH 85 Terminal near Adimali.

NH 183 Terminal near Kumily. Adimali, Kallarkutty, Panamkutty, Keerithodu, Chelachuvadu, Karimban, Thadiyanpadu, Cheruthony, Idukki, Calvarymount, Vazhavara, Nirmalacity, Vellayamkudi, Kattappana, Vallakadavu, Anavilasam, Vellaramkunnu, Kumali

== Gallery ==
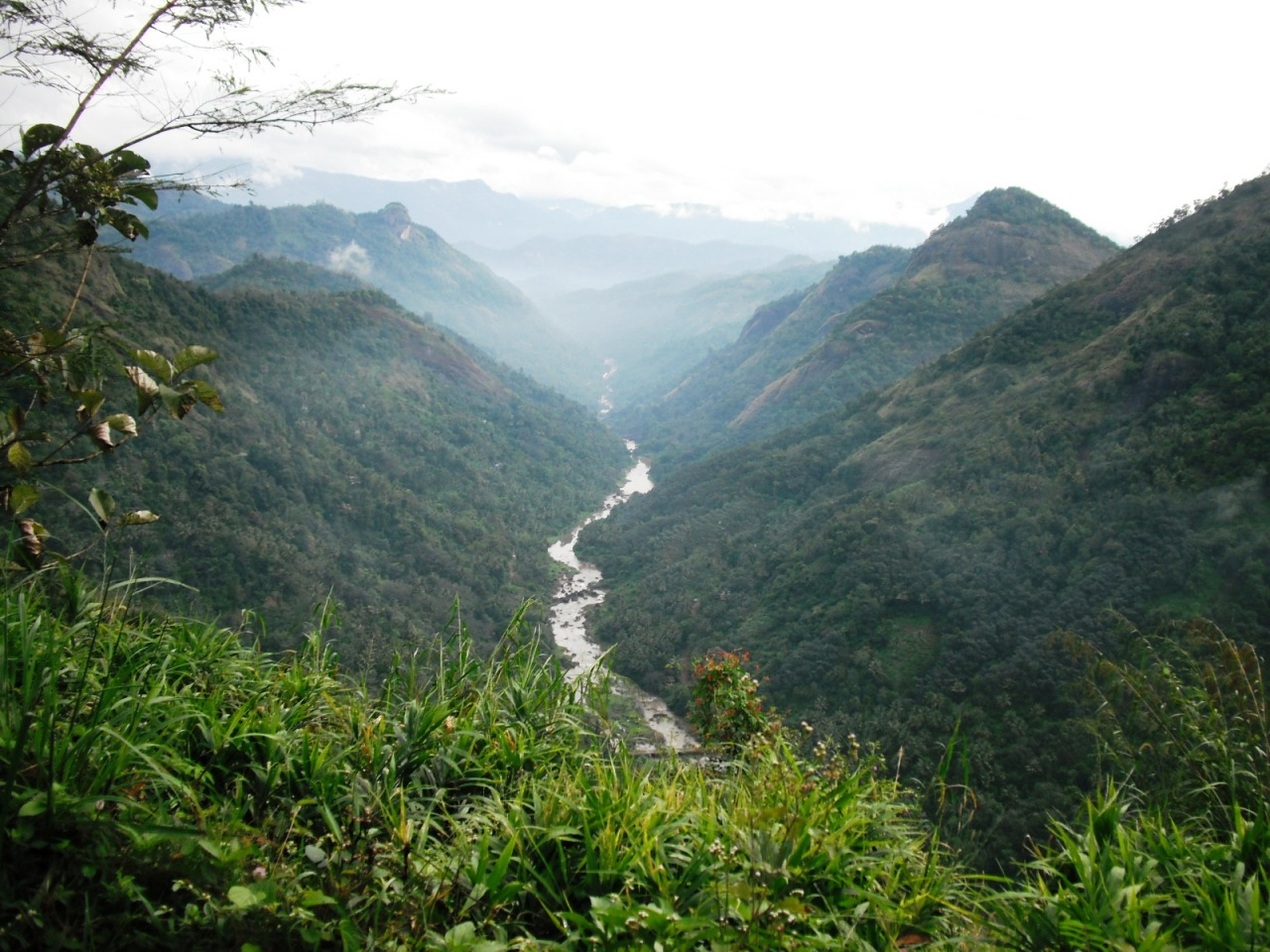
Periyar River as seen from NH 185 in Idukki district, Kerala

== See also ==
- List of national highways in India
- National Highways Development Project
