= Chakkupallam =

- Village
- Location in Kerala, India Chakkupallam (India)
- Coordinates: 9.6527°N 77.1226°E
- Country: India
- State: Kerala
- District: Idukki
- Taluk: Udumbanchola

Government
  - Type: Grama Panchayat

Area
  - Total: 28.33 km^{2} (10.94 sq mi)

Population (2011)
  - Total: 12,609
  - Density: 445.1/km^{2} (1,153/sq mi)

Languages
  - Official: Malayalam, English
- Time zone: UTC+5:30 (IST)
- Postal code: 685509
- Vehicle registration: KL-37

Chakkupallam is a Grama Panchayat and Village in Idukki district in the Indian state of Kerala. The administrative capital(Panchayat Office) and village center of Chakkupallam Grama Panchayat is Anakkara, located on Kumily-Munnar state highway.

== Demographics ==
As of 2011 Census, Chakkupallam had a population of 12,609 with 6,254 males and 6,355 females. Chakkupallam village has an area of 28.33 km^{2} (10.94 sq mi) with 3,429 families residing in it. In Chakkupallam, 10% of the population was under 6 years of age. Chakkupallam had an average literacy of 88% higher than the national average of 74% and lower than state average of 94%.
