= Kattappana =

Municipality in Kerala, India

- Municipality
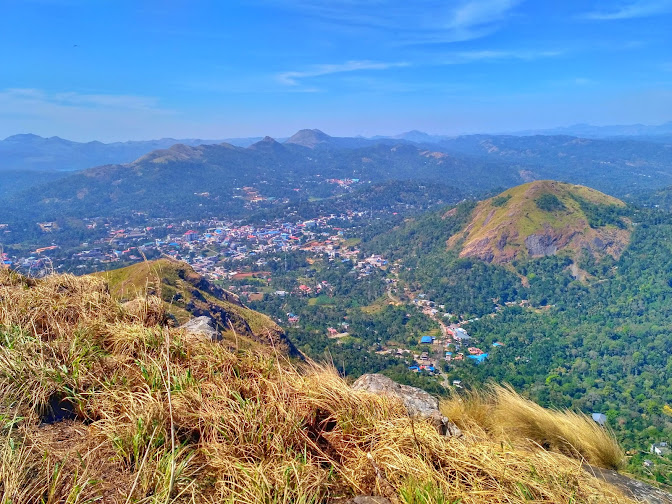
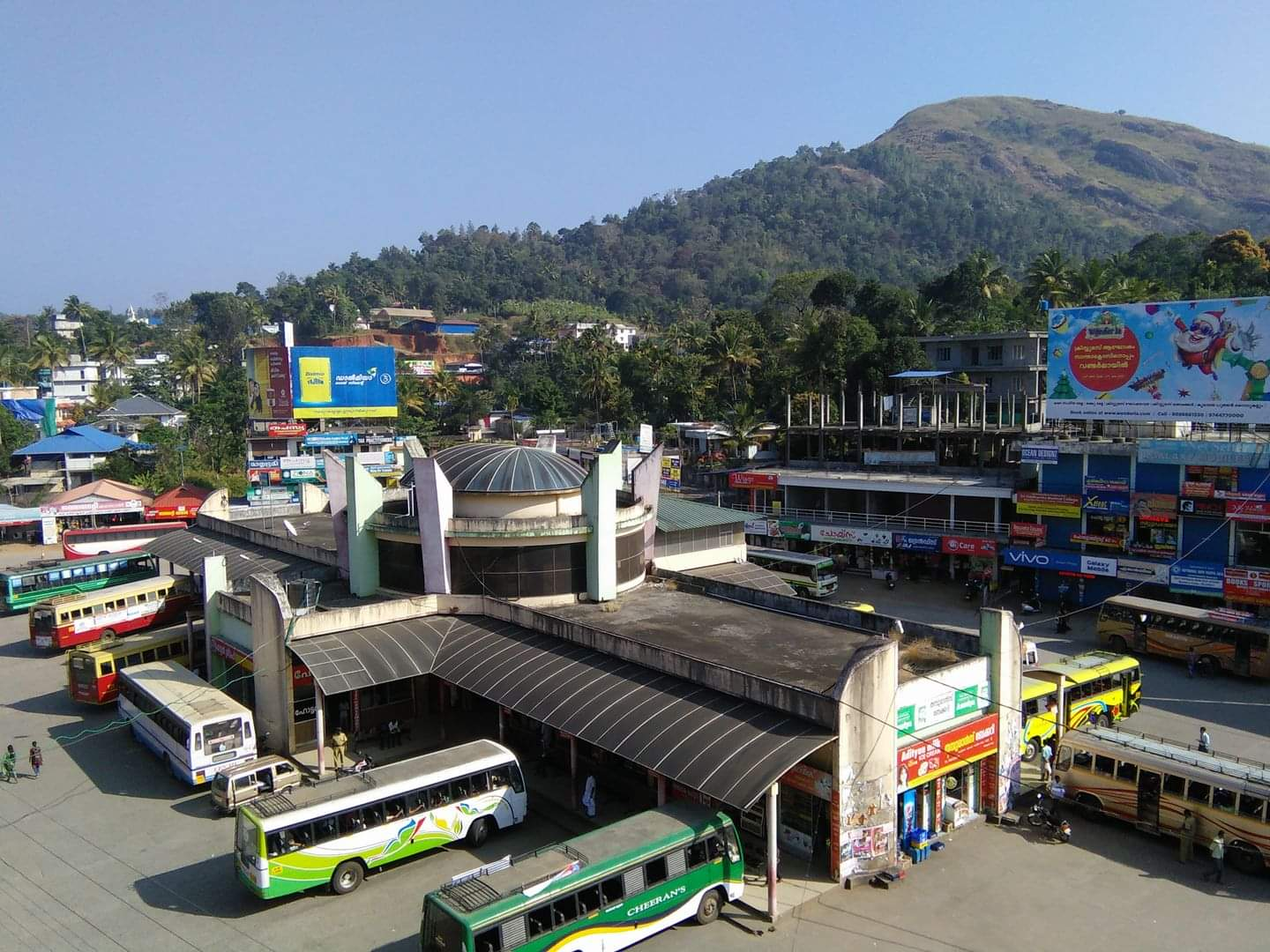
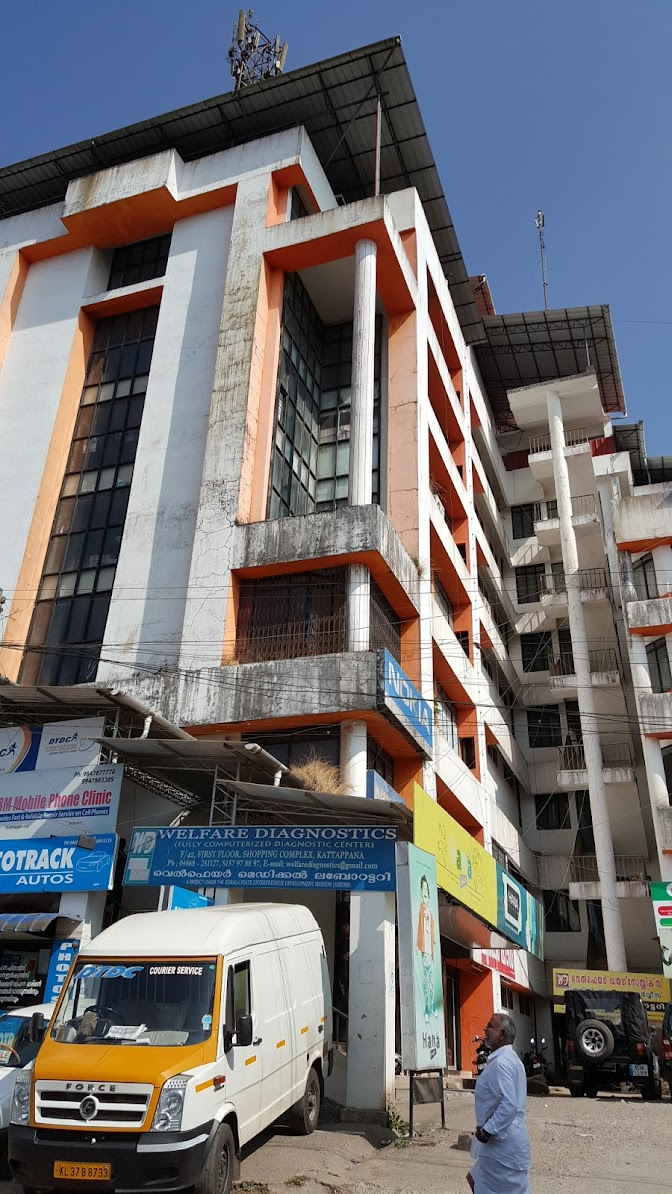
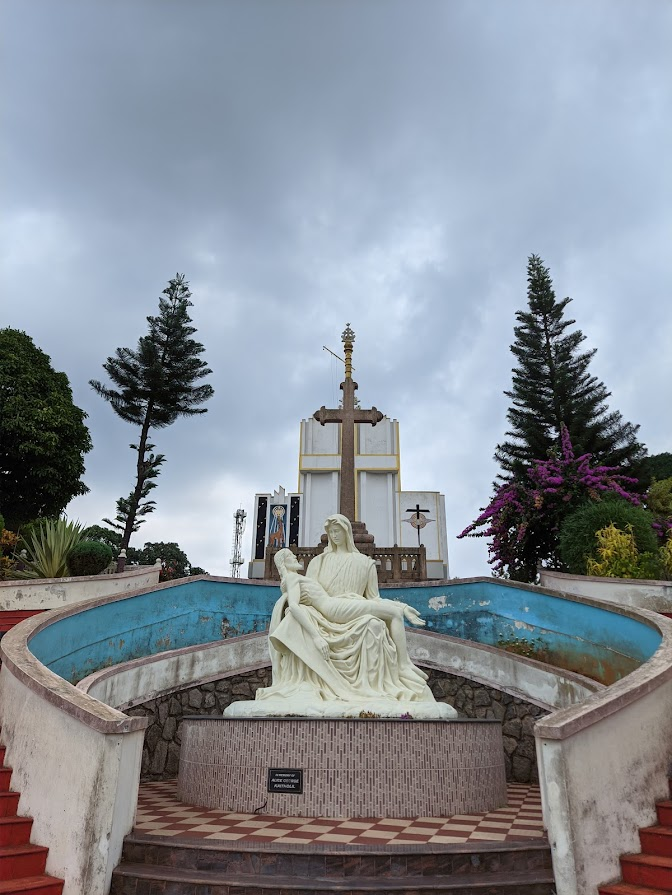
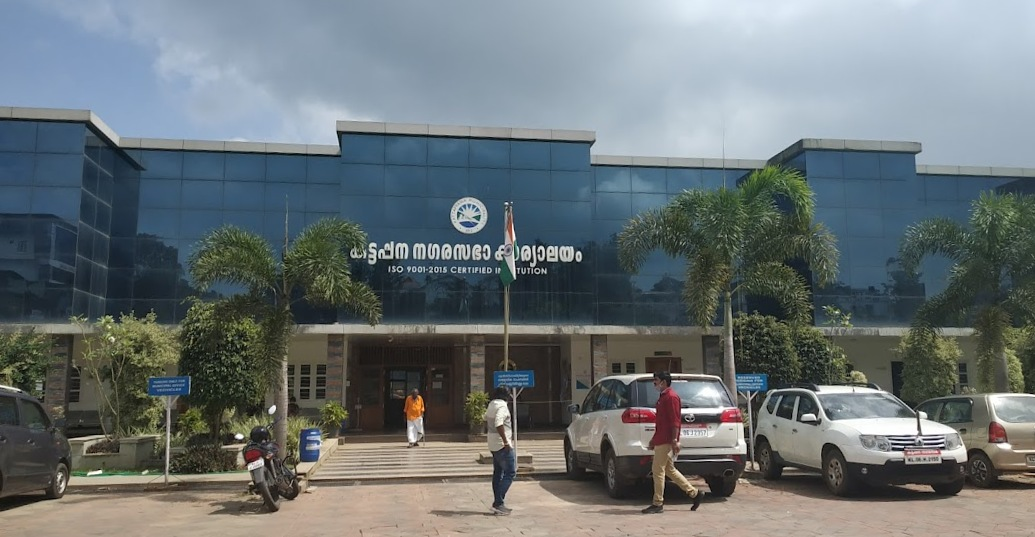
- From top, left to right: Kattappana from a nearby mountain, Kattappana new private bus stand, Housing Board Shopping Complex, St. George Forane Church and Kattappana Municipality Office

- Logo
- Interactive map of Kattappana
- Location in Kerala, India Kattappana (India)
- Coordinates: 09°45′15″N 77°06′57″E
- Country: India
- State: Kerala
- District: Idukki

Government
  - Type: Municipality
  - Body: Kattappana Municipality
  - Municipal Chairman: Joy Vettikuzhy

Area
  - Total: 52.77 km^{2} (20.37 sq mi)
- Elevation: 810 m (2,660 ft)

Population (2011)
  - Total: 42,646
  - Density: 808.1/km^{2} (2,093/sq mi)

Languages
  - Official: Malayalam, English
- Time zone: UTC+5:30 (IST)
- PIN: 685508, 685515
- Telephone code: 04868
- Vehicle registration: KL-06 (Idukki)
- Literacy: 95.25%
- Lok Sabha constituency: Idukki
- Sex ratio: 1016 ♂/♀
- Website: Kattappana Municipality

Kattappana ([kaʈ:ap:ɐna]) is a municipality in the Idukki district of Kerala, India. It is located 32 km (19.8 mi) southeast of the Idukki district headquarters in Painavu, 131 km (81.4 mi) east of major commercial city Kochi and 211 km (131.1 mi) north of the state capital, Thiruvananthapuram. Kattappana is the second largest town and one among the two municipalities in the district, and serves as a major hub for commercial and economic activity for the surrounding region.

Kattappana was formed primarily by settlers from Thodupuzha, Pala, Kanjirapally, Kothamangalam, Muvattupuzha and Changanassery in the 1950s, and was given the status of gram panchayat in 1962. The town later attained the Municipality status in 2015.

== History ==
=== Historical development ===
The area was mainly settled by people from Thodupuzha, Pala, Kottayam and Changanassery. Initially, it was a part of the Udumbanchola Tehsil (Taluk) within the Idukki district. Subsequently, it became a part of the newly formed Idukki Tehsil. Notably, Kattappana emerged as the second municipality established in the district, following Thodupuzha. Mr Johny Kulampally became the first chairperson.

The growth of Kattappana as a commercial hub for the High Ranges was supported by improvements in infrastructure, particularly the construction of the Kottayam–Kattappana road and the Puliyanmala–Thodupuzha State Highway.

=== Economy ===
Cardamom agriculture is the cornerstone of Kattappana's economy, playing a pivotal role in uplifting the town's economic well-being. The Spices Board of India (erstwhile Cardamom Board under Government of India) has an office in Kattappana. A Spices Park is established at Puttaday close to the town of Kattappana.

=== Recognition for sanitation ===
A significant achievement for Kattappana in sanitation was attaining the distinction of an Open Defecation Free Municipality in Kerala. Kattappana was first civic body in the State of Kerala to achieve this status. This recognition was conferred upon the then chairman, Shri Johny Kulampallil, by the Union Minister for Urban Development, Housing & Urban Poverty Alleviation and Information & Broadcasting, Shri M. Venkaiah Naidu, during a ceremony held in Cochin on 18 October 2016.

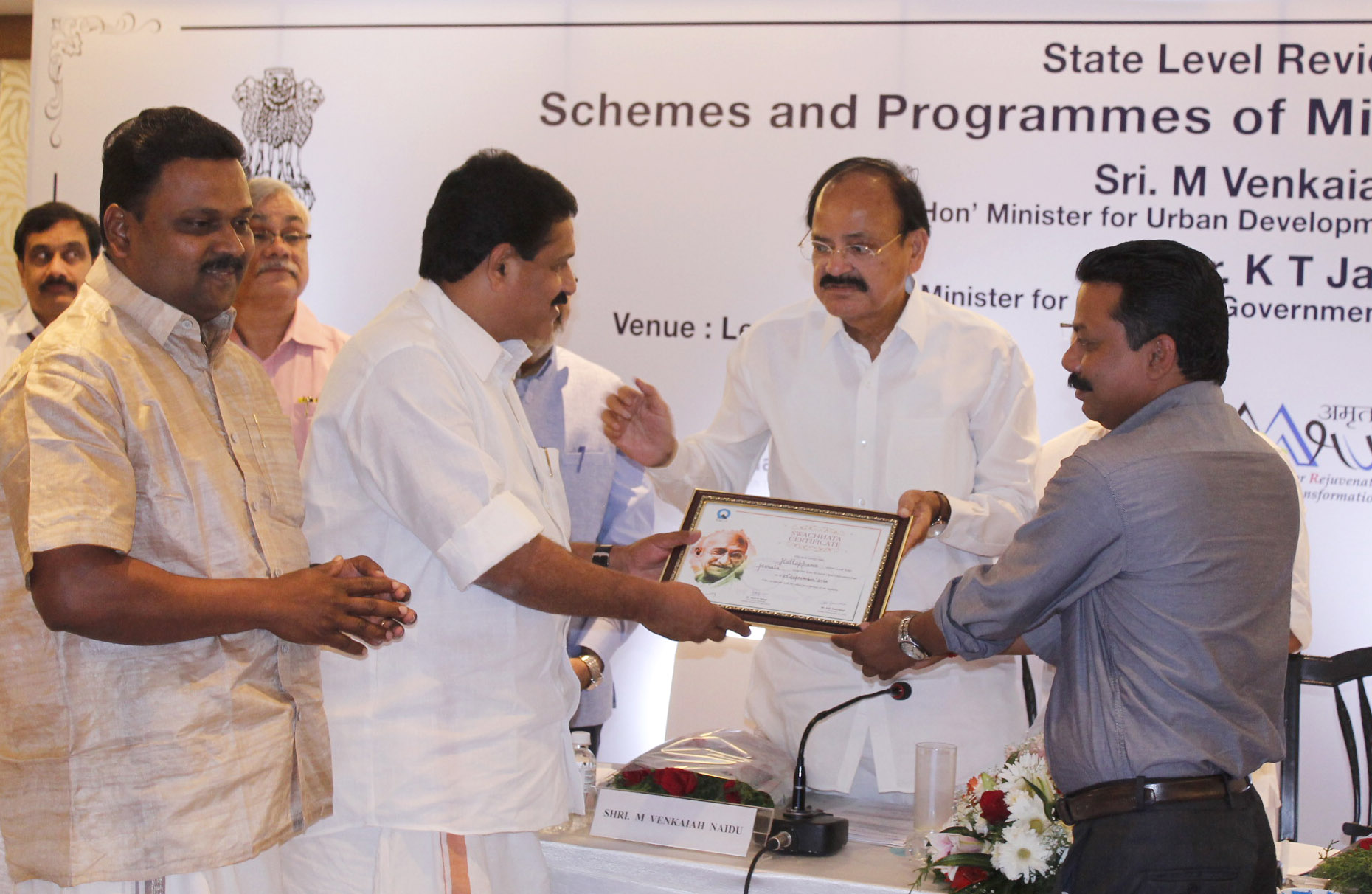
M. Venkaiah Naidu presenting the Swachhata Certificate to the Chairman, Kattappana Municipality on becoming the Open Defecation Free Municipality in Kerala, in Kochi

== Geography ==
The average elevation of Kattappana Municipality is 950 m above sea level.

=== Climate ===
Under the Köppen climate classification, Kattappana has a tropical monsoon climate. Humidity rises from March to April and mid-May. The average annual temperature is 23 °C. The months of June, July, August and October receive significant of rainfall. November and December are the coldest months in the year.

Climate data for Kattappana, Kerala
Month	Jan	Feb	Mar	Apr	May	Jun	Jul	Aug	Sep	Oct	Nov	Dec	Year
Mean daily maximum °C (°F)	26.1 (79.0)	27.4 (81.3)	29.1 (84.4)	29.3 (84.7)	29.2 (84.6)	27.2 (81.0)	26.1 (79.0)	26.5 (79.7)	26.8 (80.2)	26.2 (79.2)	25.5 (77.9)	25.5 (77.9)	27.1 (80.7)
Mean daily minimum °C (°F)	16.8 (62.2)	17.5 (63.5)	19.0 (66.2)	20.2 (68.4)	20.8 (69.4)	20.1 (68.2)	19.6 (67.3)	19.6 (67.3)	19.3 (66.7)	19.1 (66.4)	18.5 (65.3)	17.2 (63.0)	19.0 (66.2)
Average precipitation mm (inches)	22 (0.9)	30 (1.2)	52 (2.0)	116 (4.6)	163 (6.4)	307 (12.1)	396 (15.6)	246 (9.7)	163 (6.4)	252 (9.9)	176 (6.9)	75 (3.0)	1,998 (78.7)
Source: Climate-Data.org

== Civic administration ==
=== Administration ===
Kattappana is one of the two municipalities in Idukki district. It was formed under the Kerala Municipalities Act 1994 and was officially declared a municipality by the Government of Kerala on 1 November 2015. The municipal council consists of 34 wards, with members elected every five years during the local body elections. The most recent local body elections were held in 2025. The chairperson serves as the executive authority of the municipality.

Kattappana falls within the Idukki Assembly constituency and the Idukki Lok Sabha constituency. The latest Kerala Legislative Assembly election was held on 9 May 2026.

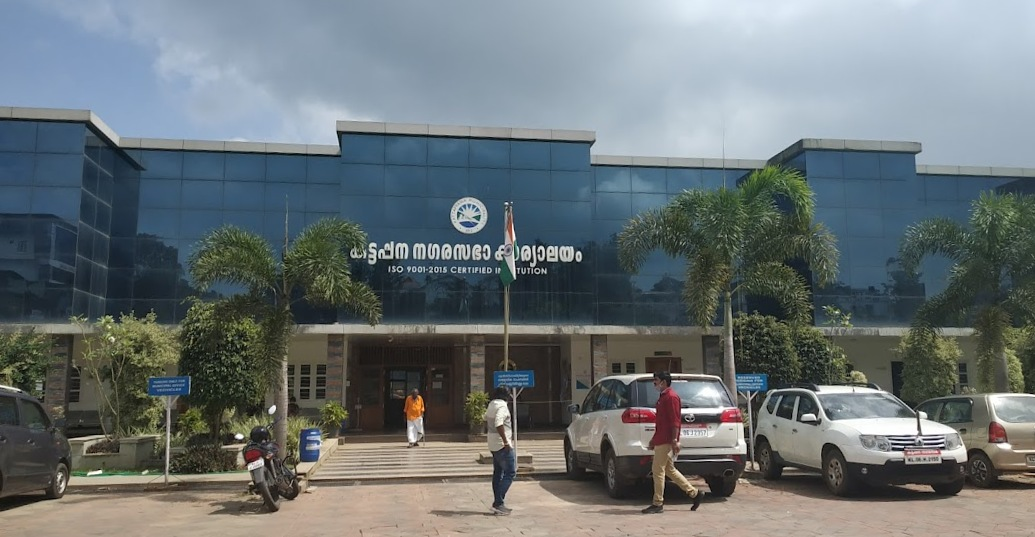
Administrative headquarters of Kattappana Municipality

=== Administrative divisions ===
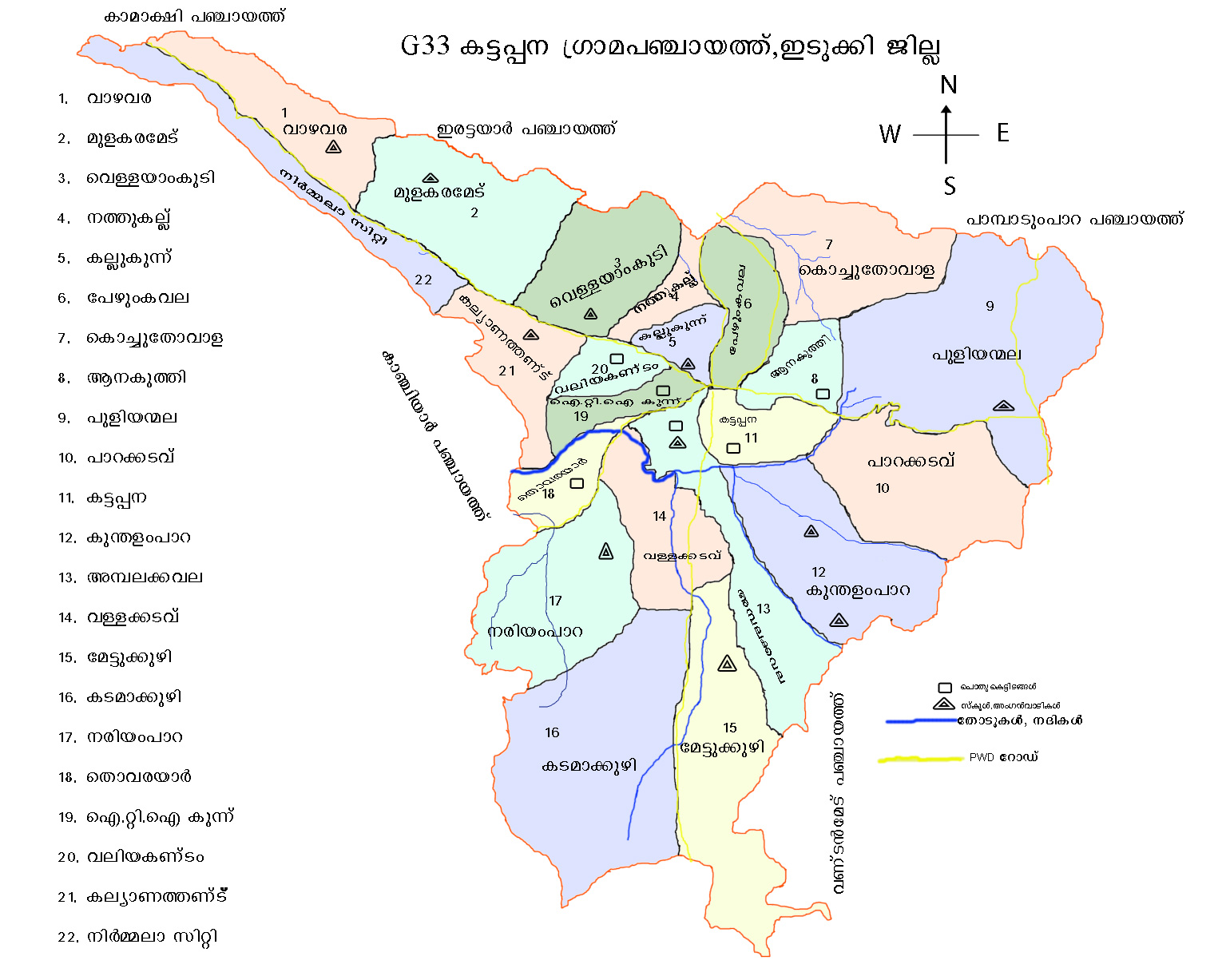

For administrative convenience, the municipality is divided into 34 wards.

Ward no.	Ward name	Ward no.	Ward name
1	Vazhavara	18	Kunthalampara North
2	Nirmala city	19	Kunthalampara South
3	Society	20	Pallikavala
4	Konginippadavu	21	Erupathekkar
5	Vellayamkudy	22	Ambalakkavala
6	Vettikkuzhakavala	23	Mettukkuzhi
7	Nathukallu	24	Vallakkadavu
8	Kallukunnu	25	Kadamakkuzhy
9	Pezhumkavala	26	Nariampara
10	Valiyapara	27	Thovarayar
11	Kochuthovala North	28	I T I Kunnu
12	Kochuthovala	29	Valiyakandam
13	Anakuthy	30	Govt. College
14	Parakkadavu	31	Suvarnagiri
15	Puliyanmala	32	Kalyanathandu
16	Ambalappara	33	Mulakaramedu
17	Kattappana	34	Kounthi

== Politics ==
The major political parties active in Kattappana are Indian National Congress (INC), Communist Party of India (Marxist) (CPI(M)), Bharatiya Janata Party (BJP) and Kerala Congress. Active trade union are Indian National Trade Union Congress (INTUC) and Centre of Indian Trade Unions (CITU).

The current member of legislative assembly (MLA) from Idukki is Roy K. Paulose. He has been the member of legislative assembly of Kerala representing Kattappana town forming a part of Idukki constituency since 2001.

The current member of parliament (MP) from Idukki is Dean Kuriakose. He was elected to the Parliament in 2019.

== Demographics ==
As of the 2011 Census, Kattappana had a population of 42,646, with 21,159 males and 21,487 females. Kattappana has an area of 52.77 km^{2} (20.37 sq mi) with 13,180 families residing in it. Kattappana had an average literacy of 95.25%, higher than the state average of 94%.

People migrated to Kattappana mainly during the 1950s from Central Travancore. The migrations were mainly from Palai, Thodupuzha, Muvattupuzha, Changanassery and Kanjirapally taluks of the undivided Kottayam district and Pathanamthitta. Descendants of earlier inhabitants, the tribals of the forest, can still be seen. The Mannan tribe is now concentrated around Kovilmala, near Kanchiyar.

== Tourist attractions ==
=== Anchuruli Tunnel ===
This is a 3.5 meters wide, 4 km long tunnel that connects the Idukki and Erattayar Reservoirs. Beyond its functional purpose, the tunnel offers a glimpse of the Anchuruli Waterfalls.

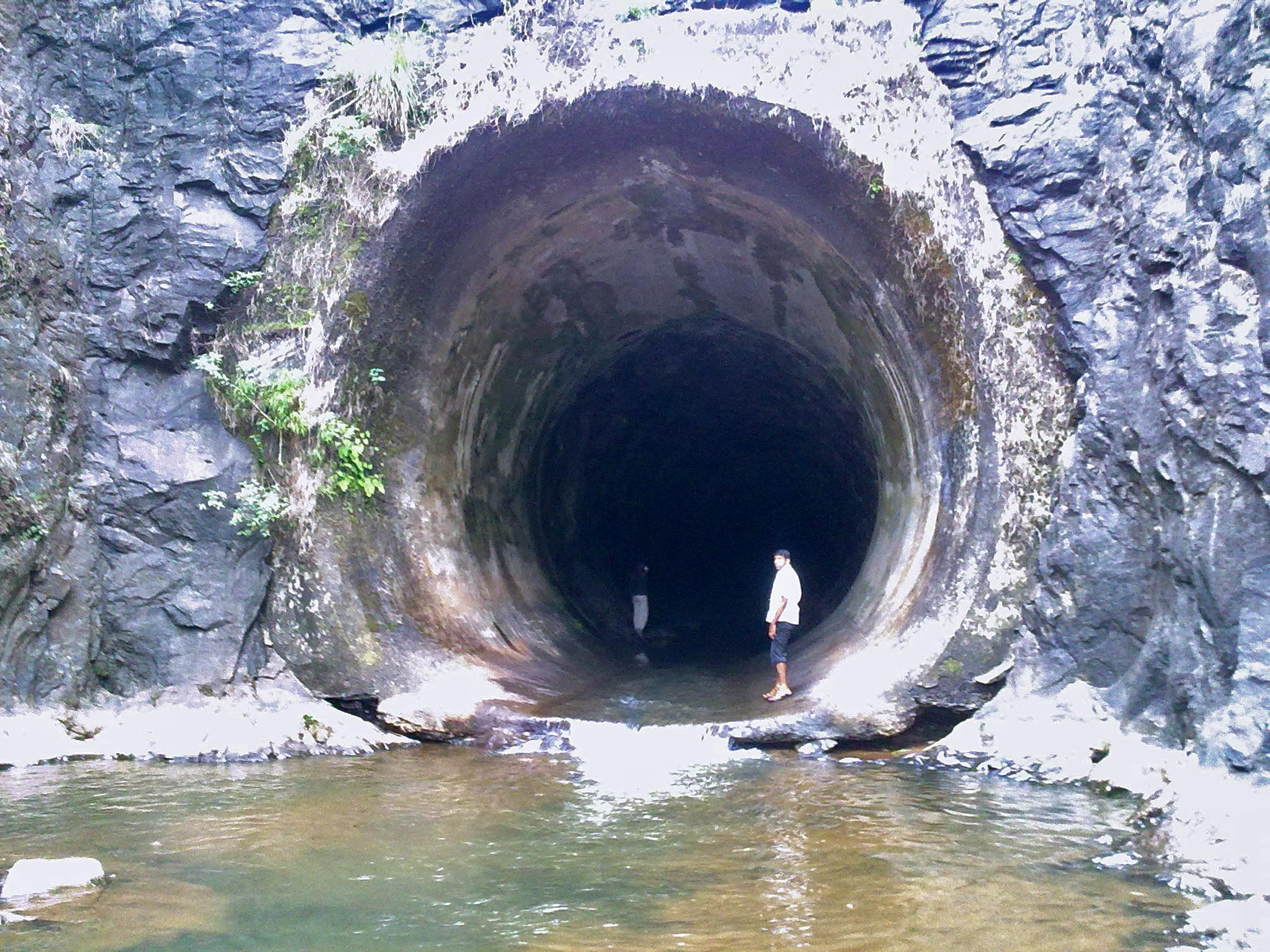
Anchurali Tunnel

=== Kalvary Mount ===
Kalvary Mount or Kalliyanathandu is a Christian pilgrimage site atop a hill with a view of the Idukki Reservoir and its surrounding peaks and forests. Once a secluded spot, it gained fame after the Idukki Dam's construction.

During Lent, the area becomes a pilgrimage centre as Christians go in a procession up the hillock.

== Agriculture ==
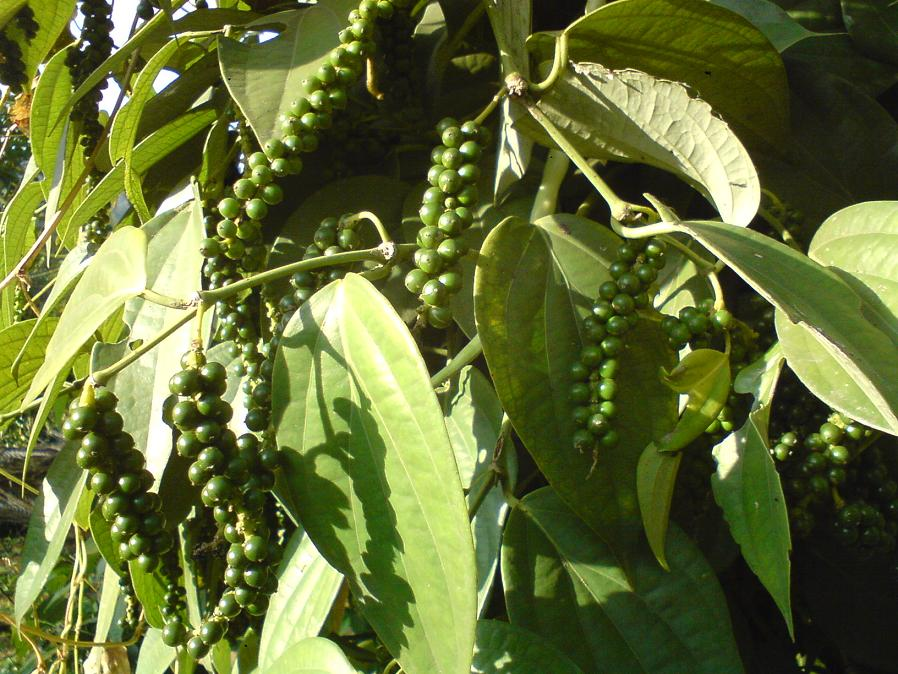
Raw black pepper

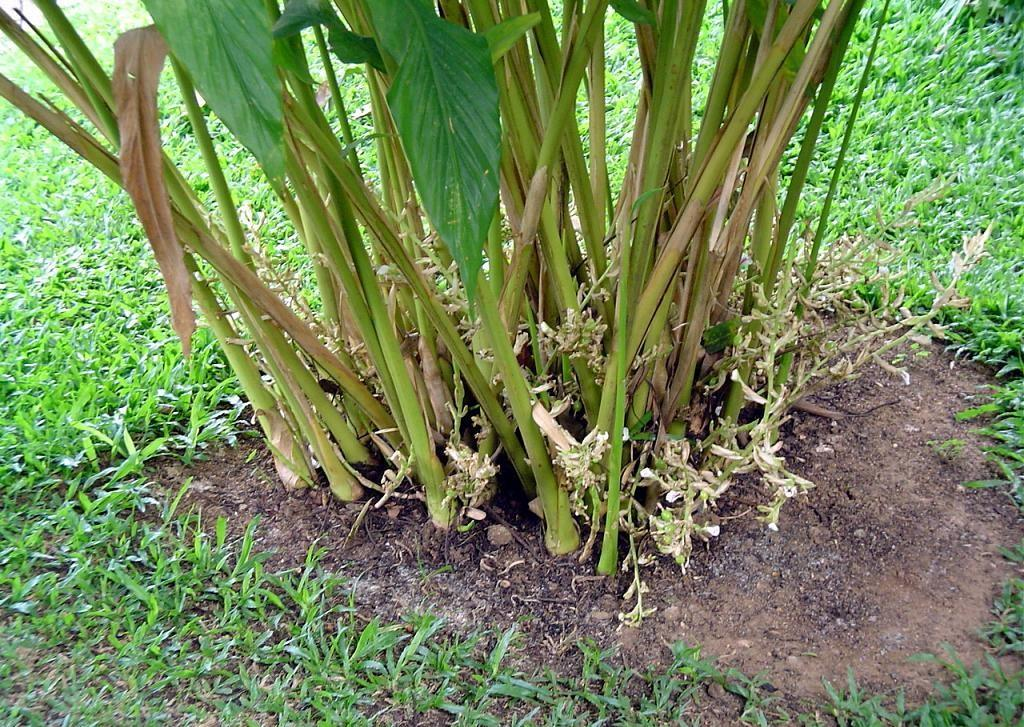
Cardamom plant

Agriculture is the primary occupation in Kattappana. The region is a major producer of cardamom. The high-yielding Njallani variety of cardamom was developed by Sebastian Joseph Njallani from Kattappana.

Other important crops include coffee, cocoa, black pepper, and ginger. Several large tea plantations, including those operated by Tata Tea, A V Thomas & Co, Malayalam Plantations, and Kannan Devan, are located in the surrounding areas.

The Spices Board (erstwhile Cardamom Board) has its regional office in Kattappana. A Spices Park was established at Puttadi near Kattappana, and the Cardamom Research Station is located at Pampadumpara.

== Healthcare ==
St. John's Hospital, managed by the Hospitaller Brothers of St. John of God, is a major healthcare facility in Kattappana. The St. John College of Nursing is attached to the hospital.

== Transportation ==
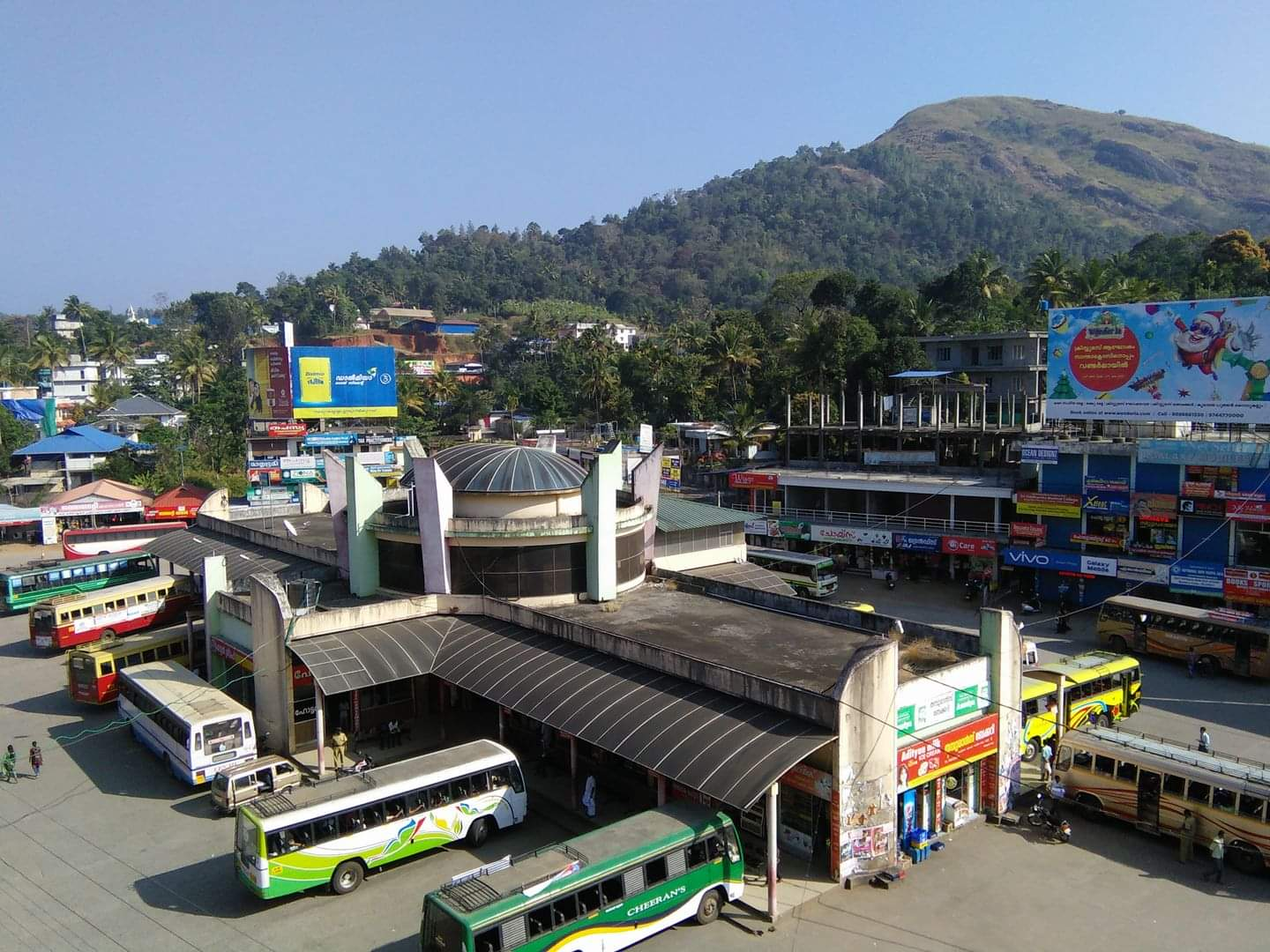
Kattappana bus stand

Kattappana is well connected by road to other districts in Kerala and to the neighbouring state of Tamil Nadu.

=== Highways ===
In 2015 a new national highway named National Highway 185 (India) was announced to Idukki district, through Adimali-Cheruthoni-Kattappana-Kumily.

The Malayora highway, also called Hill Highway, is another major road passing through Kattappana.In 2024 this road was upgraded to 13.5 metre width.

=== Distances to nearby towns ===
- Nedumkandam - - 18 km
- Kumily - - 26.8 km
- Thodupuzha - - 78.6 km
- Kottayam - - 100.2 km
- Cumbum - - 31.2 km
- Palai - - 75.2 km
- Changanassery - - 114 km
- Theni - - 68.8 km
- Thopramkudy - - 21. km
- Murickassery - - 29. km
- Adimaly - - 47. km

=== Major roads connecting Kattappana ===
- NH 185
- SH 43
- SH 33

== Education ==
Schools and colleges in Kattappana:

- M.M.H.S. Nariyampara
- SGHSS Kattappana
- Ossanam E M HSS Kattappana
- Govt. High School Anakkara
- Govt. Tribal H S Chakkupallam
- STHSS Erattayar
- Govt. H S Erattayar, Nalumukku
- SJHSS Vellayamkudy
- St. Mary`s High School Vazhavara
- S M H S Marykulam
- GHS Chempakappara
- GTHS Kattappana
- GHS Vazhavara
- Gandhiji English Medium Govt High School
- G.L.P.S.Ayappencovil
- V.M.L.P.S.Ettithope
- G.T.L.P.S.Kanchiyar
- G.L.P.S.Pookulam
- G.L.P.S.Karimkulam
- L.P.S.Marykulam
- S.D.L.P.S.Chakkupallam
- J.M.L.P.S.Ezhukumvayal
- G.L.P.S.Idinjamala
- S.P.L.P.S.Chempakappara
- G.L.P.S.Kozhimala
- S.M.L.P.S.Kanchiyar
- L.M.L.P.S.Labbakkada
- S.G.L.P.S.Kattappana
- S.J.L.P.S.Kochuthovala
- S.J.L.P.S.Vellayamkudy
- S.A.L.P.S.Vallakkadavu
- A.M.U.P.S.Kalthotty
- S.M.U.P.S.Marykulam
- A.K.M.U.P.S.Kochera
- S.M.U.P.S.Kanchiyar
- S.J.U.P.S.Kattappana
- S.J.U.P.S.Kochuthovala
- S.A.U. P. S.Vallakadavu
- LFLPS Puliyanmala
- Ossanam EMLPS Kattappana
- Marian Public School, Marykulam
- St.Mary's LP School, Nankuthotty
- St Pius X English School, K Chappath, Idukki
- Govt Kattappana College
- Christ College Kattappana
- JPM Arts and Science College
- M.E.S. College, Nedumkandam
- Sahyajyothi Arts and Science College, Kumily
- Asramam Training College, Vazhavara
- Sree Narayana Trusts Arts&Science College
- Sanjo College Rajakkad
