= Anakkara (Idukki) =

Anakkara 8th Mile
- Village
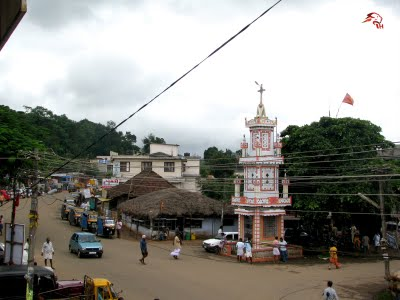
- Anakkara town

- Location in Kerala, India Anakkara (India)
- Coordinates: 9.6646°N 77.1658°E
- Country: India
- State: Kerala
- District: Idukki district

Area
  - Total: 38.46 km^{2} (14.85 sq mi)
- Elevation: 900 m (3,000 ft)

Population (2011)
  - Total: 24,192
  - Density: 629.0/km^{2} (1,629/sq mi)

Languages
  - Official: Malayalam, English
  - Regional: Malayalam, Tamil
- Time zone: UTC+5:30 (IST)
- PIN: 685512
- Telephone code: 04868
- Vehicle registration: KL-37

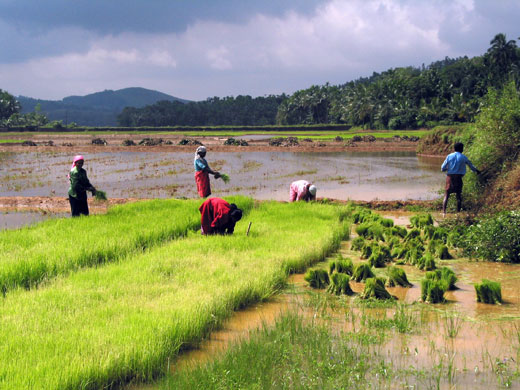
Paddy Fields in Anakkara, Idukki

Anakkara is a geographic area of around 50 square kilometres (12,000 acres) that spreads across Vandanmedu, Chakkupallam Panchayats in the Udumbanchola Taluk of Idukki District, Kerala, India. Anakkara is the administrative capital of Chakkupallam Grama Panchayat and Anakkara Revenue Village. It is about 18 kilometers (11 mi) from Thekkady wildlife sanctuary on the Kumily-Munnar state highway. It is at an altitude of about 4,000 feet (1,200 m) above sea level.

== Demographics ==
As of 2011 Census, Anakkara had a population of 24,193 with 12,056 males and 12,136 females. Anakkara village has an area of 38.46 km^{2} (14.85 sq mi) with 5,962 families residing in it. The average sex ratio was 1007 lower than the state average of 1084. In Anakkara, 9.8% of the population was under 6 years of age. Anakkara had an average literacy of 92% lower than the state average of 94%: male literacy was 94.2% and female literacy was 89.9%.

== History ==
=== Modern history ===
In 1972 Kottayam district of Kerala was split into Kottayam and Idukki districts. In 1986, around 50 km^{2} area of Vandanmettu village was split into a new revenue village by the name Anakkara.

== Gallery ==
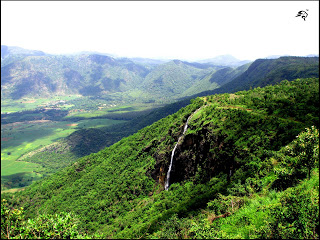
View from Chellarcovil

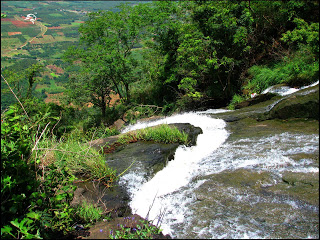
Aruvikuzhy

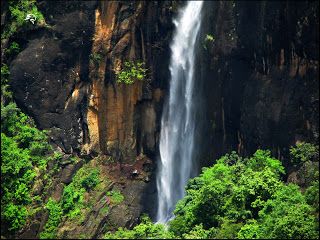
Waterfalls

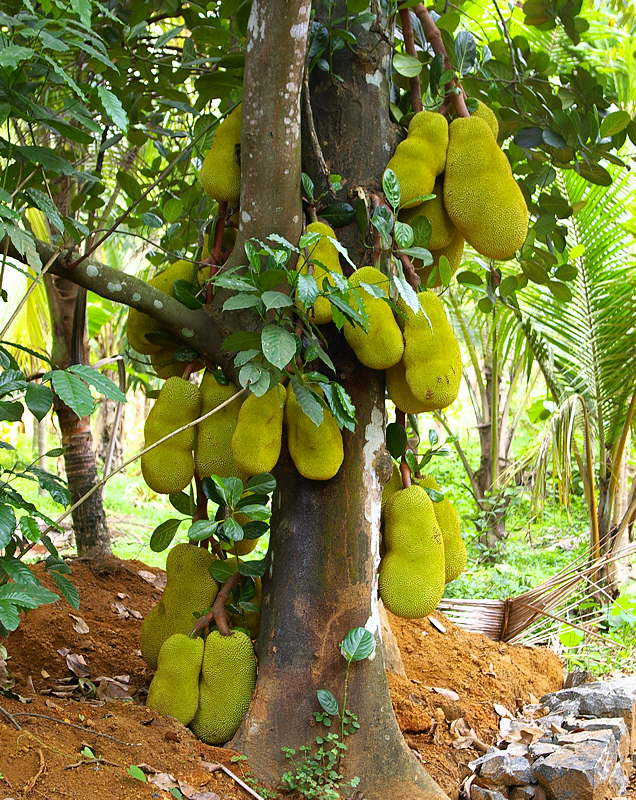
Jackfruits in Anakkara

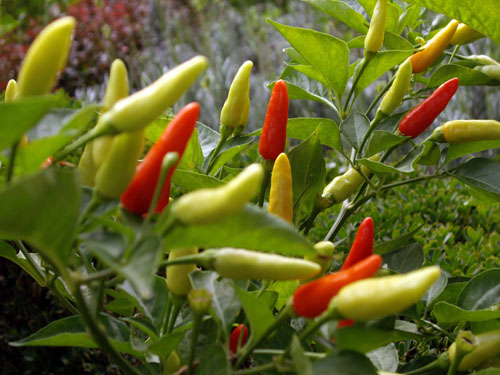
A real taste of Anakkara "Kandhari"
