= Vandanmedu =

- village
- Location in Kerala, India Vandanmedu (India)
- Coordinates: 9°43′0″N 77°9′0″E
- Country: India
- State: Kerala
- District: Idukki

Area
  - Total: 29.12 km^{2} (11.24 sq mi)

Population (2011)
  - Total: 12,138
  - Density: 416.8/km^{2} (1,080/sq mi)

Languages
  - Official: Malayalam, English
  - Regional: Malayalam, Tamil
- Time zone: UTC+5:30 (IST)
- PIN: 685551
- Telephone code: 04868
- Vehicle registration: KL-37, 69
- Nearest city: Kattappana
- Literacy: 90%%
- Lok Sabha constituency: Idukki
- Vidhan Sabha constituency: Udumbanchola

Vandanmedu is a village in Idukki district in the Indian state of Kerala.

Vandanmedu is the biggest cardamom plantation in India.

== Demographics ==
As of 2011 India census, Vandanmedu had a population of 12138 with 6028 males and 6110 females.

== Religion ==
Various sections of Christianity, Hinduism and Muslim co-exist harmoniously. Hindu community Ezhava, Nair, Viswakarma and others. Nair community has a strong population. Christians, mainly Catholic, Orthodox Pentecostal, Anglicans live there.
