= Kumily =

- town
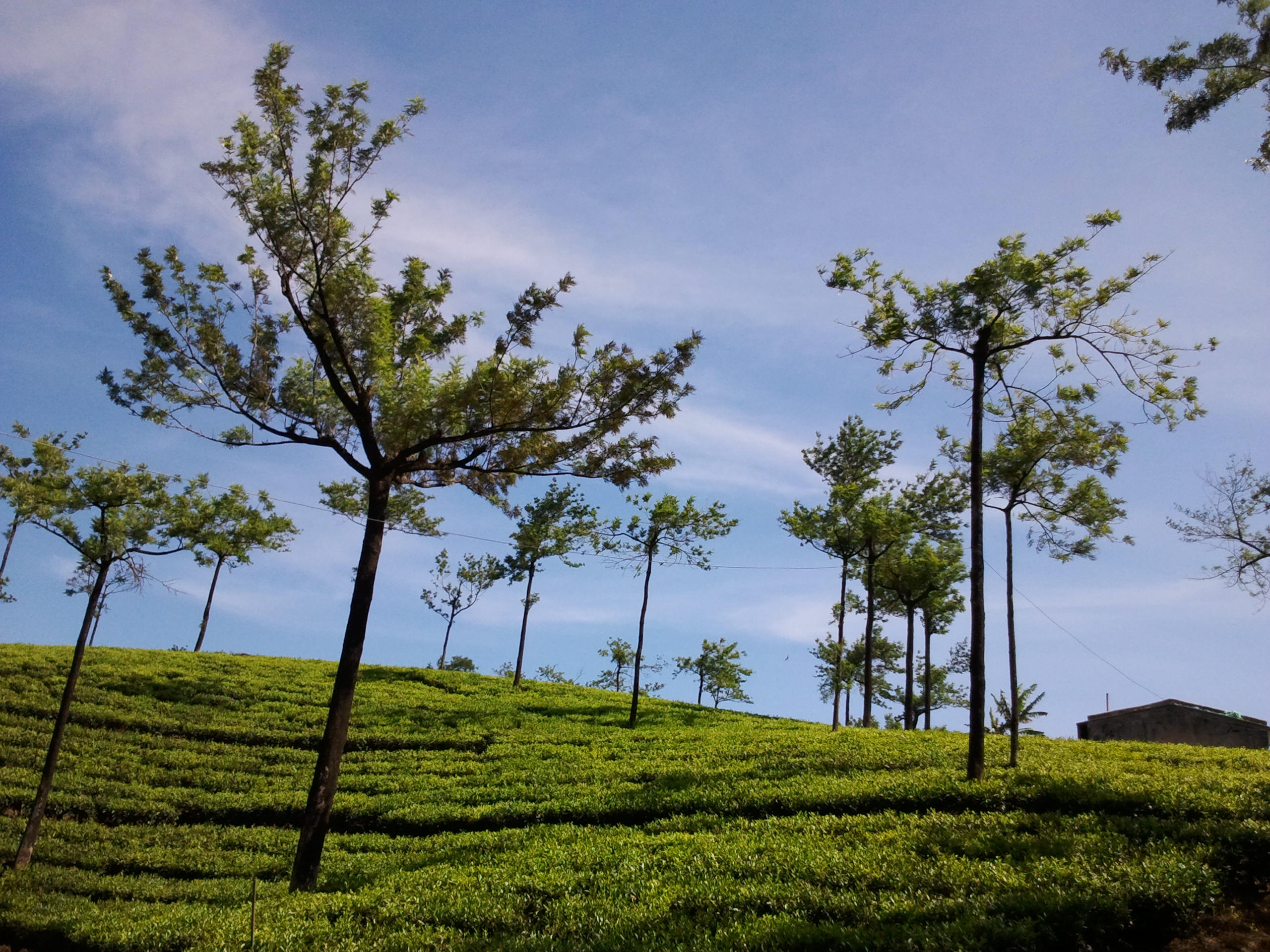
- Tea plantations at Kumily

- Location in Kerala, India Kumily (India)
- Coordinates: 9°37′0″N 77°9′0″E
- Country: India
- State: Kerala
- District: Idukki
- Taluk: Peerumedu
- Named for: Thekkady tourist spot

Government
  - Type: Panchayati raj (India)
  - Body: Kumily Grama Panchayat

Area
  - Total: 816.73 km^{2} (315.34 sq mi)
- Elevation: 880 m (2,890 ft)

Population (2011)
  - Total: 35,915
  - Density: 43.974/km^{2} (113.89/sq mi)

Languages
  - Official: Malayalam, English
- Time zone: UTC+5:30 (IST)
- PIN: 685509
- Area code: 04869
- Nearest City: Kattappana, Nedumkandam, Kottayam
- Assembly constituency: Peerumedu
- Lok Sabha constituency: Idukki

Kumily, also spelt as Kumaly (Malayalam: [kumɐɭi]), is a revenue village and Gram Panchayat in the Idukki district of the state of Kerala. It is a town in Cardamom Hills near Thekkady and Periyar Tiger Reserve and a well frequented tourist destination. Kumily is a border town of Kerala adjacent to Tamil Nadu.

== Etymology ==
The name "Kumily" is derived from the Tamil / Malayalam term Kumizh (Tamil: குமிழ்) / (Malayalam: കുമിഴ്), meaning "bubble" or "spring," likely referring to natural water sources in the Cardamom Hills. The area was historically known as part of the Peerumade high ranges under Travancore administration.

== History ==
Kumily's modern development began in the early 20th century under the Travancore princely state, when high-range forests were cleared for plantation agriculture. Settlers from central Kerala and Tamil Nadu were resettled to cultivate cardamom, tea, and rubber, transforming the region into a major spice hub despite challenges from wildlife and malaria.

The area saw significant migration in the 1940s–1950s during post-war agricultural expansion. After Indian independence in 1947, Kumily became part of Travancore-Cochin state in 1949. With the formation of Kerala state on 1 November 1956, it was included in the newly created Kottayam district before being transferred to Idukki district upon its formation on 26 January 1974.

The establishment of the Periyar Wildlife Sanctuary in 1950 (notified as a tiger reserve in 1978) brought conservation focus, restricting further forest clearance and shifting economic reliance toward eco-tourism. By the 1980s, Kumily emerged as a gateway town for sanctuary visitors, with homestays and spice shops replacing some plantation labor.

The Grama Panchayat system formalized local governance; Kumily Grama Panchayat was constituted under the Kerala Panchayat Raj Act, 1994, covering 816.73 km² including revenue villages like Kumily and Thekkady. As of 2023, it remains a key border settlement facilitating trade and tourism between Kerala and Tamil Nadu.

== Demographics ==
As of 2011 Census, Kumily Grama Panchayat had a population of 35,915 with an area of 816.73 km^{2} (315.34 sq mi) and Kumily revenue village had a population of 30,276 (15,162 male and 15,114 female) which spreads over an area of 203.31 km^{2} (78.50 sq mi) with 7,404 families residing in it. The average sex ratio was a bit lower than the state average (997 vs 1084). 10.3% of the population was under 6 years old. Kumily had an average literacy of 90.5%, which is lower than the state average of 94%; male literacy was 93.6% and female literacy was 87.4%.

== Transportation ==
Two national highways pass through Kumily town, National Highway 183 and National Highway 185 There are many different busses going to several towns in Kerala and Tamil Nadu.

The nearest railway station is 60 km away at Theni. The nearest Airport is 120 km away at Madurai.

== Gallery ==
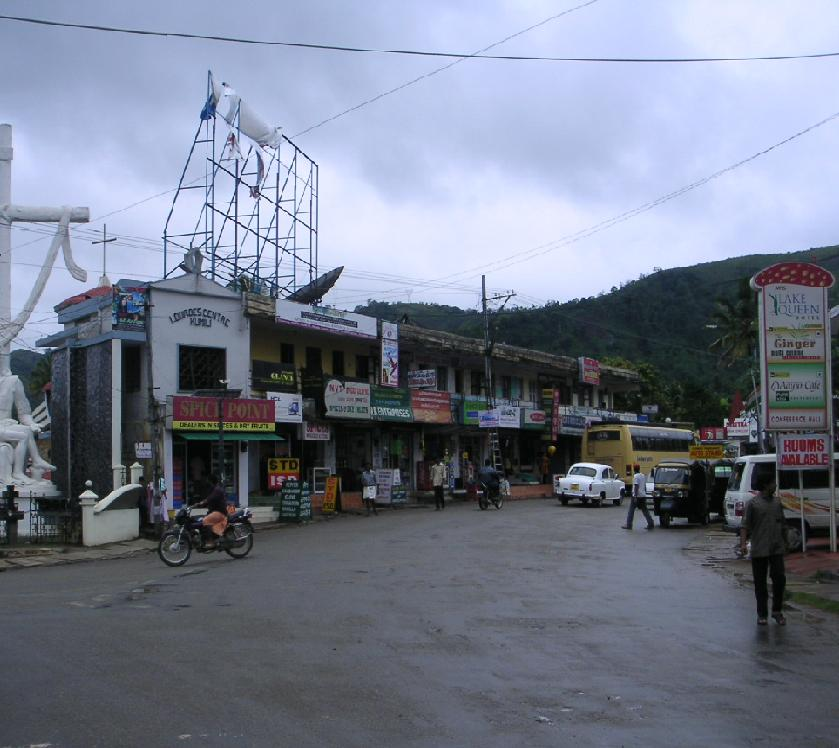
National Highway 183 runs through the downtown Kumily in 2006

== See also ==
- Thekkady
- Wagamon
- Vandiperiyar
- Periyar
- Gavi
- Kalvary Mount
