= Murickassery =

- town
- Location in Kerala, India
- Coordinates: 9°57′20″N 77°1′0″E
- Country: India
- State: Kerala
- District: Idukki

Languages
  - Official: Malayalam, English
- Time zone: UTC+5:30 (IST)
- Telephone code: 04868
- Vehicle registration: KL-06
- Nearest towns: Adimaly, Idukki, Kattappana

Murickassery is a town, market and educational centre in the Idukki district of Kerala state, South India. This is a village of migrant farmers and migrants has been developing as an important centre of Idukki. Various spice products provide the life blood for this village and market. Murickassery is situated in Vathikkudy Grama Panchayath.

The town has an official government post office. The area postal pin code is 685604.

== Transport ==
Murickassery is 20.9 km away from Painavu, which is the district capital of Idukki district. Murickassery is well connected with all parts of highranges. It serve as a connecting point of various major highrange roads including:

- Murickassery – Adimali – Munnar
- Murickassery – Thopramkudy – Kattappana – Kumily
- Murickassery – Thopramkudy – Nedumkandam- Cumbum
- Murickassery – Karimban – Cheruthoni – Painavu – Moolamattom – Muttom – Thodupuzha
- Murickassery – Rajapuram
- Murickassery – Vannappuram – Thodupuzha
- Murickassery – Vannappuram – Muvattupuzha /Kothamangalam – Cochin
- Murickassery – Thopramkudy -Kattappana
- Murickassery –Thopramkudy - Kattappana – Elappara – Kottayam
- Murickassery –Thopramkudy Kattappana – Kumily – Thekkadi
- Murickassery – Adimali – Munnar- Eravikulam National Park
- Murickassery – Adimali – Munnar – Chinnar Wildlife Sanctuary

== Education ==
The people of the region consider Murickassery as an affordable centre of education. Pavanatma College is an important school in the local area. St Mary's Higher Secondary school has is another notable school in the town. This was also a place for private tutorial colleges and tuition centres. Lower middle class farmers of Murickassery and nearby villages including Thopramkudy, Padamugham, Moongappara, Parathode, Mannathara, Rajamudy, Pathinaramkandam, Poomamkandam, Kambilikandam, Melechinnar etc. Often find places for school and college education in Murickassery.

=== List of Schools and Colleges ===
- Govt. Higher Secondary School Pathinaramkandam
- Jyothi Nursery School
- St. Mary's LPS Murickassery
- St Mary's Higher Secondary School
- De-Paul Public School (Rajamudy, Murickassery)
- I C M Public School
- Pavanatma College
- Mar Sleeva College
