= State Highway 40 (Kerala) =

Highway in Kerala, India

State Highway 40
- Alappuzha – Madurai Road
- SH 40 highlighted in red

Route information
- Maintained by Kerala Public Works Department
- Length: 114.815 km (71.343 mi)

Major junctions
- West end: NH 66 in Alappuzha
- SH 42 in Vechoor; SH 15 in Vaikom; SH 42 in Elanji; SH 1 in Puthuvely; SH 42 in Vazhithala
- East end: SH 43/TN-MDR 90 in KL/TN border at Cumbummettu

Location
- Country: India
- State: Kerala
- Districts: Alappuzha, Kottayam, Ernakulam, Idukki

Highway system
- Roads in India; Expressways; National; State; Asian; State Highways in Kerala
← SH 39	→ SH 41

State Highway 40 (SH 40) is a state highway in Kerala, India that starts in Alappuzha and ends in Madurai, Tamil Nadu, India . The highway is 183 km long.

== Route map ==
Alappuzha – Muhamma – Thanneermukkam – Vechur Bund Road – Kallara– – Manjoor– Kuruppanthara– Thalayolaparambu – Peruva – Mutholapuram -Koothattukulam –Marika - Vazhithala – Kolani – Thodupuzha – Vandamattom -Kodikulam - Chalakkamukku - Kaliyar- Vannappuram - Kanjikuzhy - Chelachuvadu - Murickassery - Thopramkudy - Nedumkandam - Thookkupalam - Cumbummettu

== See also ==
- Roads in Kerala
- List of state highways in Kerala
