= State Highway 42 (Kerala) =

Highway in Kerala, India

State Highway 42
- name
- SH 42 highlighted in red

Route information
- Maintained by Kerala Public Works Department
- Length: 190 km (120 mi)

Major junctions
- West end: Kumarakom
- SH 40 in Vechoor; SH 15 in Kaduthuruthy; SH 40 in Elanji; SH 1 in Uppukandam; SH 40 in Vazhithala; SH 8 in Karimkunnam; SH 33 in Painavu; NH 185 in Karimban; SH 40 in Thopramkudy
- East end: Cumbummettu

Location
- Country: India
- State: Kerala
- Districts: Kottayam, Ernakulam, Idukki

Highway system
- Roads in India; Expressways; National; State; Asian; State Highways in Kerala
← SH 41	→ SH 43

State Highway 42 (SH 42) is a state highway in Kerala, India, that starts in Kumarakom and ends in Cumbum. The highway is approximately 190 km long.

== Route ==
Kumarakom Boatjetti jn. – Edayazham – Kallara – Kaduthuruthy - kuruppanthara – Neezhoor - Elanji– Piravom Vazhithala – Karimkunnam – Velliyamattom – Kulamavu – Painavu – Rajamudy – Thopramkudy - Ezukuvayal - Kallar - Nedumkandam - Cumbammettu

== See also ==
- Roads in Kerala
- List of state highways in Kerala
