= Karunapuram =

- Village
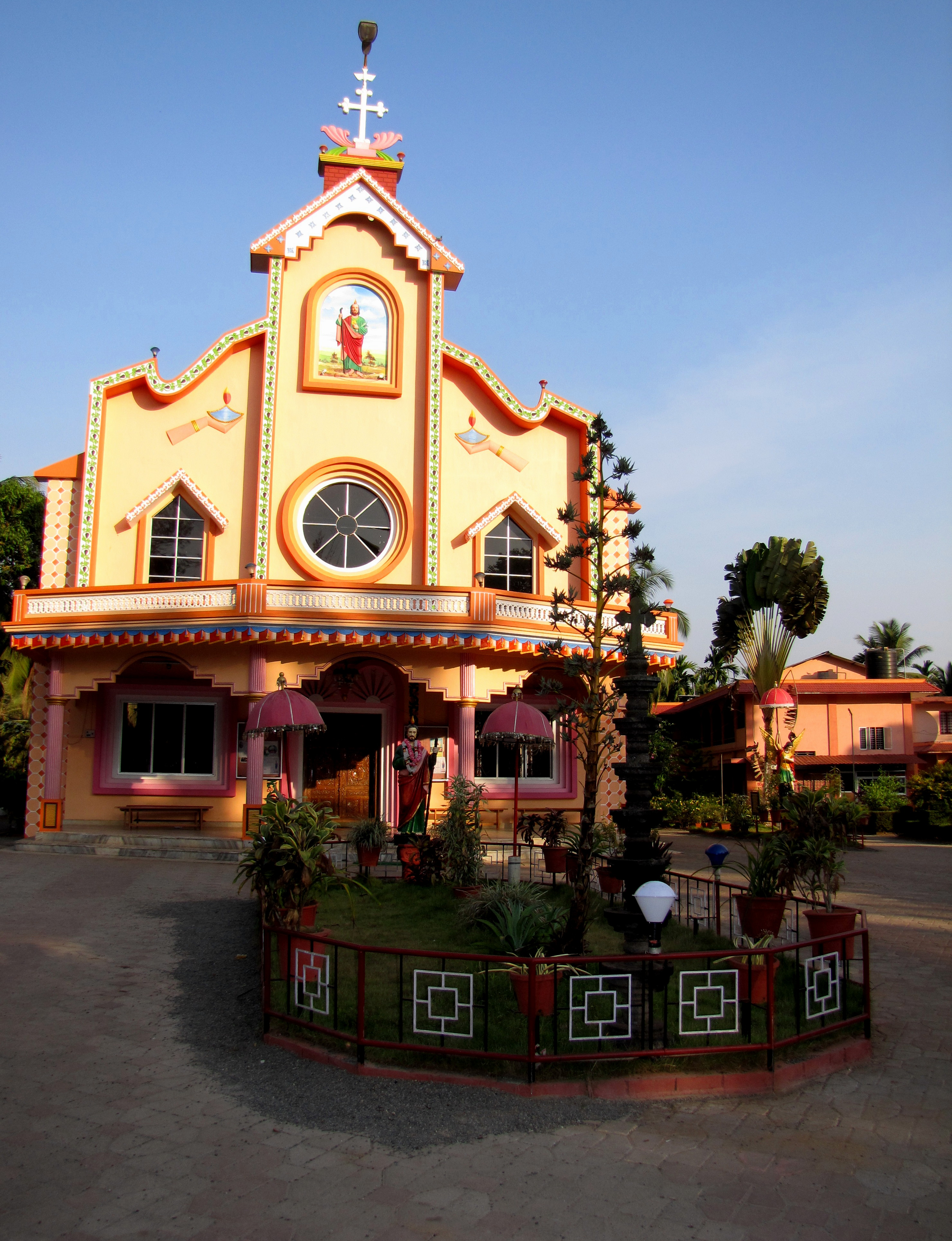
- St.Jude's church

- Location in Kerala, India Karunapuram (India)
- Coordinates: 9.7605°N 77.2205°E
- Country: India
- State: Kerala
- District: Idukki
- Taluk: Udumbanchola

Government
  - Type: Panchayati Raj (India)
  - Body: Karunapuram Grama Panchayat

Area
  - Total: 53.21 km^{2} (20.54 sq mi)

Population (2011)
  - Total: 30,473
  - Density: 572.7/km^{2} (1,483/sq mi)

Languages
  - Official: Malayalam, English
- Time zone: UTC+5:30 (IST)
- PIN: 685552

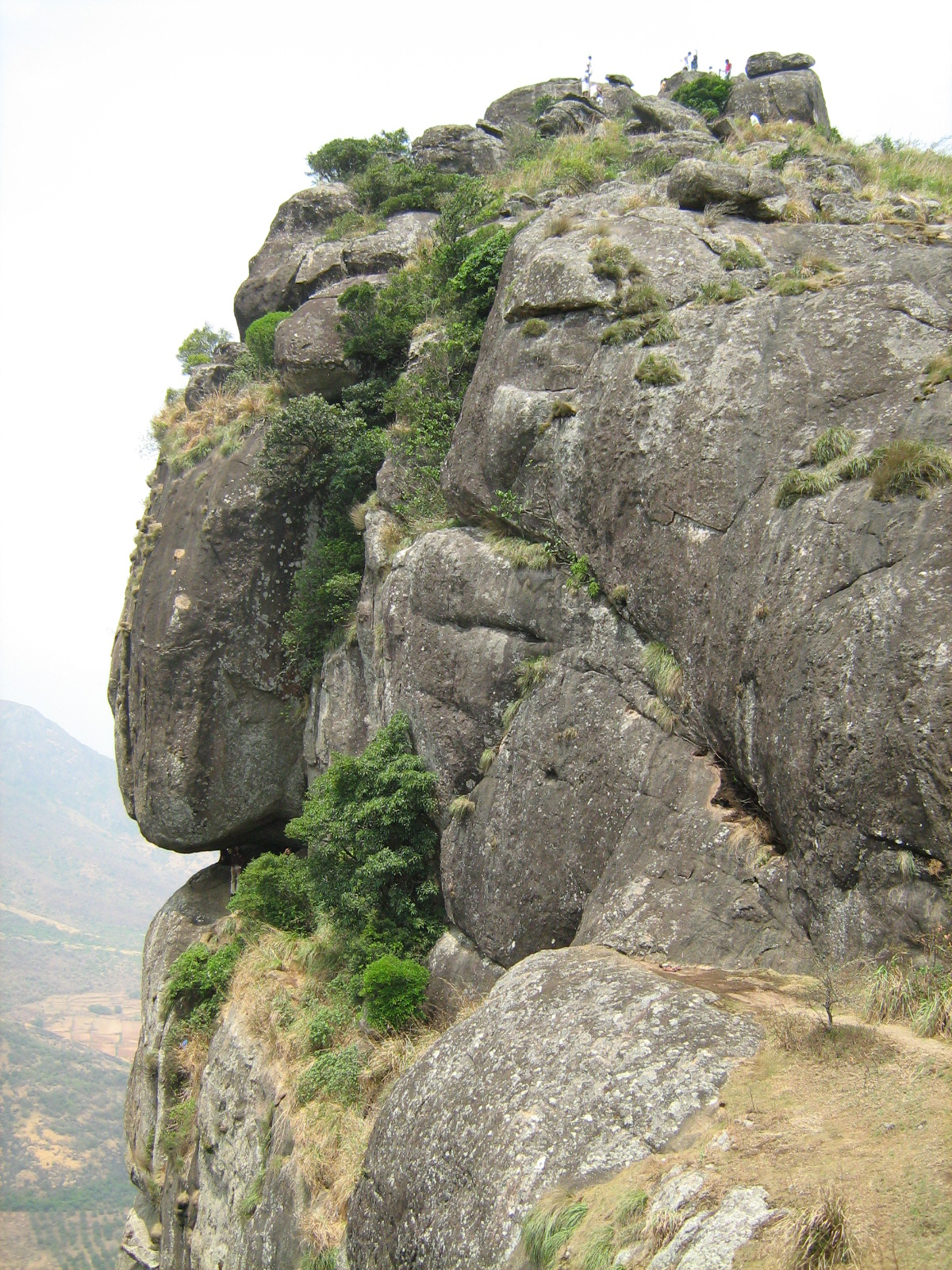
Ramakkalmedu

Karunapuram is a village in Idukki district in the Indian state of Kerala.

== Demographics ==
As of 2011 Census, Karunapuram had a population of 30,473 with 15,084 males and 15,389 females. Karunapuram village has an area of 53.21 km^{2} (20.54 sq mi) with 7,571 families residing in it. The average sex ratio was 1020 lower than the state average of 1084. In Karunapuram, 10% of the population was under 6 years of age. Karunapuram had an average literacy of 96% higher than the state average of 94%: male literacy was 97.3% and female literacy was 94.8%.

== Transportation ==
Karunapuram village passes through State Highway 40 (Kerala) which connects it with major towns of Idukki, Kottayam and Alappuzha districts. The nearest towns are Nedumkandam, Kattappana and Cumbum which are equidistant from Karunapuram village.

== See also ==
- Nedumkandam
- Thookkupalam
- Kattappana
