= Idukki township =

Idukki Town Highrange
- Township
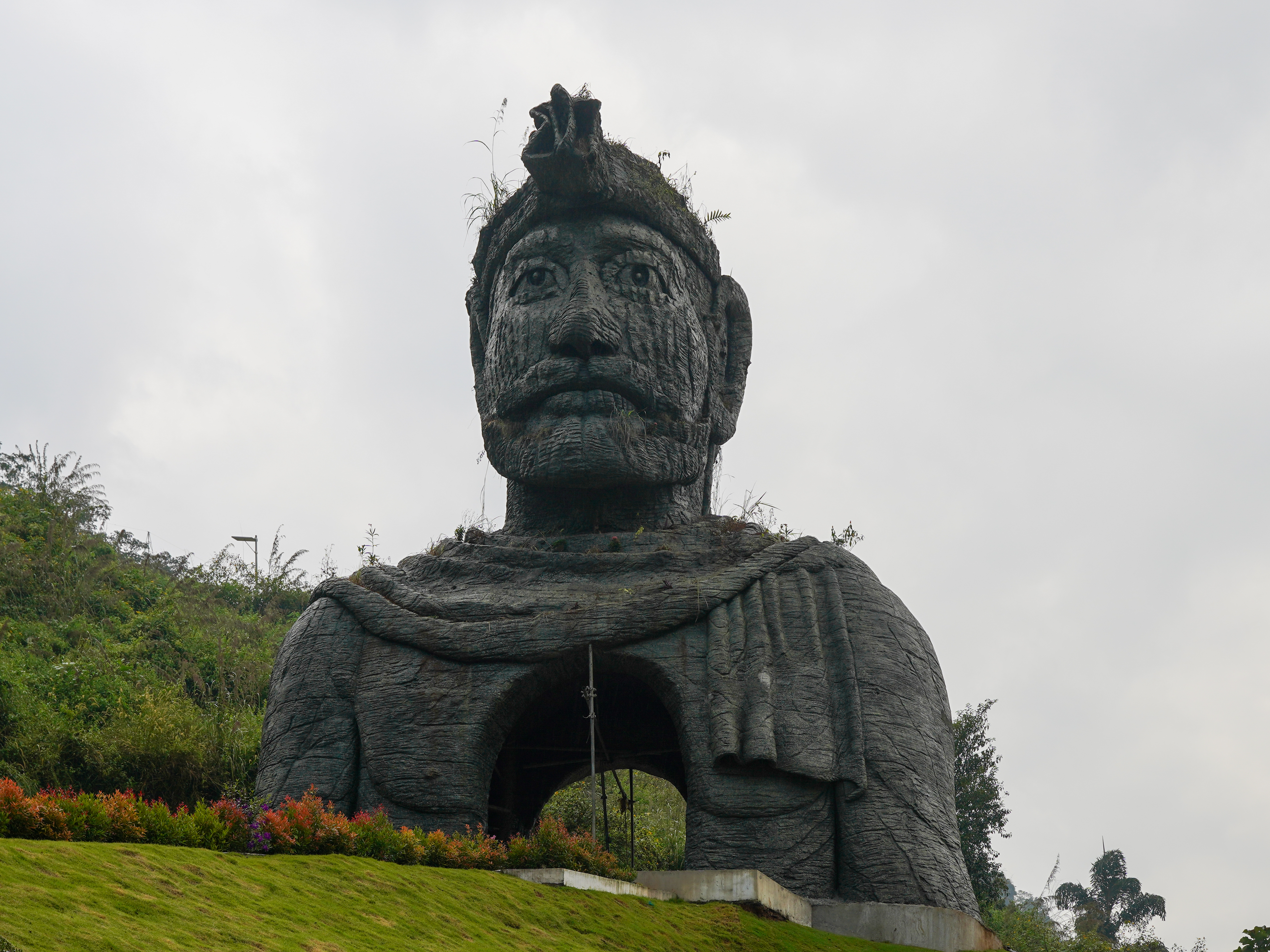
- Kolumban statue, guide to Idukki project
- Nickname: Highrange
- Interactive map of Idukki Town
- Coordinates: 9.85°N 76.97°E
- Country: India
- State: Kerala
- District: Idukki district

Government
  - Type: Panchayat

Population (2011)
  - Total: 21,724

Languages
  - Official: Malayalam, English
- Time zone: UTC+5:30 (IST)
- Postal codes: 685602,685603
- Vehicle registration: KL-06
- Nearest city: Kattappana, Thodupuzha
- Website: https://idukki.nic.in/en/

Idukki (ഇടുക്കി; IPA: [iɖukːi]) is a township in Idukki district near to the district headquarters Painavu in the state of Kerala, southern India. The township consists of the towns of Cheruthoni, Painavu (district capital), Thadiyampadu, Idukki proper and Vazhathope. Idukki is an administrative town, but the district headquarters is located at Painavu.

The town is also a tourist spot with Idukki dam, Asia's largest Arch dam and Cheruthony dam, Kerala's biggest dam. River Periyar flows through the heart of the town.

== Etymology ==
The name Idukki was derived from the Malayalam word ‘Idukk’, which means gorge.

== Demographics ==
According to the census data, in 2011 Idukki Township had a population of 21,724 of which 10,779 were men and 10,945 were women. SC comprised 9.0% and ST were 7.8% of the population. The village had 84.3% literacy rate.

The Saint George’s Cathedral in Idukki Township is the episcopal see of the Syro-Malabar Catholic Eparchy of Idukki (an Eastern Catholic diocese, Chaldean = Syro-Oriental rite).

== Governance ==
Idukki Town is a part of Idukki Assembly constituency and of India's federal Idukki Lok Sabha constituency.

== Places of interest ==
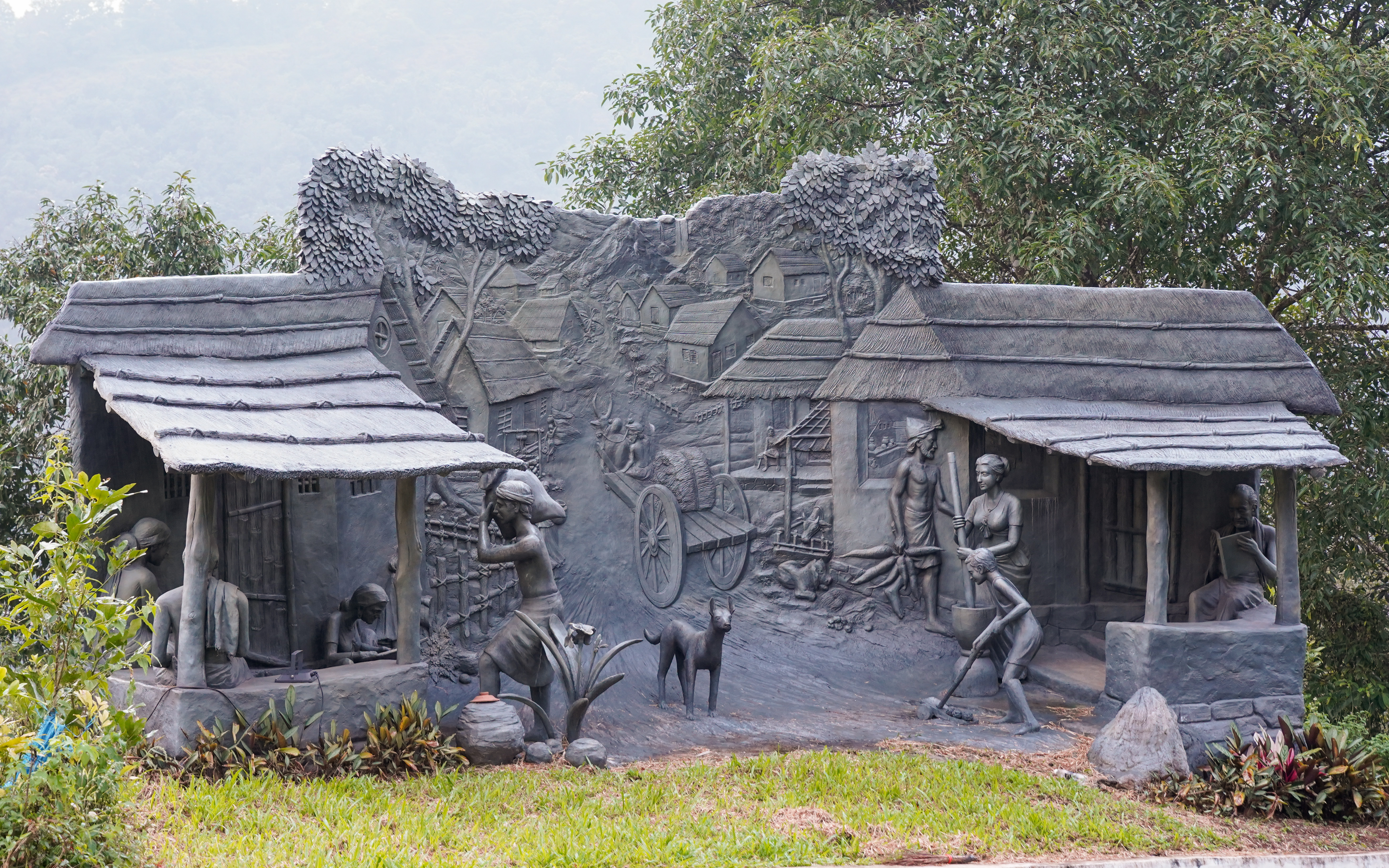
Village scene, Idukki Dam Park

- Idukki Dam
- Idukki Dam Park

== Nearby places ==
Towns

- Kattappana
- Thodupuzha
- Nedumkandam
- Adimali
- Thopramkudy
- Cheruthoni
- Painavu
- Thankamani
- Moolamattom
- Rajamudy
- Kuzhikandom

== Sources and external links ==
- GCatholic - St George’s Cathedral, Syro-Malabar Diocese of Idukki
