= Rajamudy =

- Village
- Interactive map of Rajamudy
- Coordinates: 9.897032°N 77.180953°E
- Country: India
- State: Kerala
- District: Idukki
- Talukas: Udumbanchola

Government
  - Type: Ward
  - Ward Member: Smt. Daisy Vandhanam
- Elevation: 723 m (2,372 ft)

Population
  - Total: 1,648

Languages
  - Official: Malayalam, English
- Time zone: UTC+5:30 (IST)
- PIN: 685604
- Telephone code: 04868
- Vehicle registration: KL-68
- Nearest Places: Upputhode, Thopramkudy
- Lok Sabha: Idukki, Legislative Assembly constituency too
- Literacy: 99.9%

Rajamudy is a small village in Idukki district of Kerala state, India. It is in the "High Ranges" which lie in the lap of Western Ghats. .

== History ==
Rajamudy (Malayalam: രാജമുടി), is one of the smallest villages in Idukki district.

== Geography and demographics ==
Rajamudy is in the "High Ranges" of the district of Idukki under Vathikudy Grama Panchayath as a ward and village at an altitude of 2,372 feet (723 m) with coordinates of 9.897032°N and 77.180953°E. It borders with Upputhode in the West-South, Pathinaramkandom in the North-East having a distance of 1.5 kilometers, Padamugham and Mannathara in the East respectively 3 to 5 kilometers. Though there is no much precipitous hillocks and hilly-rocky heights as of nearby or other "High Ranges", there are, after the plain town or junction of Rajamudy, vertical agricultural lands down towards North-West plain valley of Upputhode, and a slight steep to North towards the small river that separates Rajamudy-Pathinezhukambani and flows making Rajmudy fertile towards the valley of Upputhode Separating Rajamudy, Upputhode and Karikinmedu. The areas of Rajamudy further extends to the beneath of Mannathara heights towards East thus forming Rajamudy as a lovely and spectacular knoll and hummock with all fecundity for agriculture and safety free from the bout of natural calamities. The district Idukki gets all seasons and climate accordingly; especially rainy and winter seasons give more down pour and cold due its high range hills and forests, but Rajamudy has pleasant and moderate weather.

== Culture ==
Dissimilar the other villages and areas of the district Idukki, which is concomitant and interspersed with Tamil Nadu culture by sharing long borders and other developed districts of central Kerala, the people of Rajamudy have an impulsive and renowned culture san external stimuli developed and conserved by the people itself- Culture of Accordance and Unity beyond segregative notions, attitude, superstitious rituals, following and customs. The custom of Rajamudy is a mixed one as of its bygone harmony could be traced back to the migrant days of the populaces onwards. There were families and people of different religious, caste, colour and creed from migrant days to present days. Though the prominent religion of this small village is Christianity (RC, CMS, CSI, Pentecost), there is no any type of dominance in any realm. There was no such communal segregation or violence and discriminatory attitude from any leading personnel, elected representatives (ERs), religious leaders of Rajamudy so far. The famous Christuraja Church Mass Celebration (Thirunal or Perunnal), Srinaryana Jayanthi and Sobha Yathra etc. everyone cordially invite each other and attend in the celebrations, processions and cultural events. The visit of Christmas Message Propagation Groups (Carol) visiting every house in the Month of December from the Chriistu Raja, CMS and CSI Churches and every house offers refreshments exemplifies the identical culture and accordance of people.

== Languages ==
Malayalam, the popular and official governing vernacular language of Kerala is the etymological dialect of the people of Rajamudy. Though there are no illiterates in the village, most of the people use only Malayalam. There are youngsters who use English and Hindi too. In earlier days there were people who speak the local dialect that was seen among the tribes like Mannan, Urali and Murriken. Nonetheless progressively the contemporaneous generation of those groups speaks and uses the official language of Kerala, Malayalam.

== Economy ==
Rajamudy is agrarian in all aspects. Almost all families; 95.9% are regular agriculture-investing families and farming communities only. Thus Rajamudy’s mainstay income is agriculture only. There are few families depend on agro-allied activities and agro-labour too. There are few handful artisan and construction, quarry working-class families. There are no landless or homeless families in Rajamudy. Major crops grown here are black pepper vines, cocoa, coffee-beans, aromatic spices like clove, jathi, sarvasugandhi, edible items like ginger, turmeric, tapioca cassava and commercial crops & tree-based farming items like rubber, coconut trees, areca palm etc. and very few families cultivate vegetables too. And the comestible fruit bearing trees and plants like jack-fruit, guava, elumbi, mango etc. can also be seen here.

== Sports and significance ==
Since settlement inception onwards the youths of Rajamudy engage in sports and games; especially Rajamudy is famous for Volleyball Tournaments. A volleyball court had been made in front of the Christuraja Church and for more than two decades, it was the favorite place for all villagers gathered in the evening hours playing in the court and watching the youngsters played. Rajamudy hosted and organized many local, district and state level tournaments. Two ever-rolling Trophies; Vadakel Trophy and Poothakuzhiyil Trophy meant for first and second place-winner prizes exemplify the sports promotion and interests of Rajamudy.

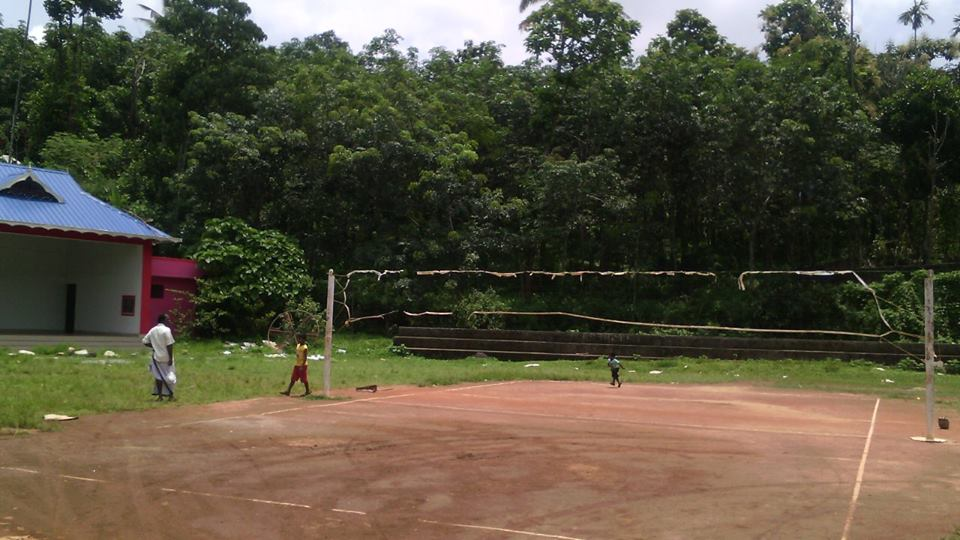
The Stadium at Rajamudy (Gramapanchayath Mini Stadium)

In 1991, a long-held dream of the local youth and community came true with the construction and inauguration of an exclusive stadium in Rajamudy. Built under the VGP Panchayath Raj Institution (PRI) scheme, the project was facilitated by the then Ward Member, Sri. Babu Panachinanickal. The land for the stadium was jointly provided by Sri. Thomas Ouseph (Olickal), Sri. Baby Antony (Vazheparambil), and the CR Church. In addition to being a central gathering point for the community, the premises hold significant civic importance as they host the area's only Anganwadi, which functions with commendable amenities.

Another area or sports in fame for Rajamudy is the native competition of tug-of-war, for which Rajamudy has always been updated professional team. The teams contested and attended in many district/state level competitions fetching and crediting commendations and prizes.

== Assembly constituency ==
Rajamudy falls under the Assembly and Parliament Constituency of Idukki. There are 956 voters in this small village which alike support all major national and regional political parties of Kerala.

== Schools and colleges ==
Rajamudy has two schools and an Anganvadi. The school that is run under the Christuraj Church Management (aided) on the Church’s own land established in 1983, close to its premises is one among the two schools of Rajamudy.

The second school named De-Paul Public School situated on the side of Pathinaramkandom-Rajamudy road is the one in a multi-storied building with all modern amenities and campus.

The nearest and old Government School is GHS Pathinaramkandom only (The School was started in 1968 and now it is a higher secondary school), in which most of the Rajamudy children got education up to the 10th Standard. And before the establishment of the school, the children used to go to Parathode for education. Now Rajamudy is blessed with a professional college Mar Sleeva College of Arts and Science as a culmination of the first-migrant families to present generation wished and intensely longed for.

== Worship Centers ==
=== Christu Raja Church ===
The believers or followers of Syro-Malabar denomination or churches, who were at Rajamudy till 1970 (totally), attended St.Joseph Church Upputhode, St. Mary’s Church, Murickassery and Holy Family Church, Kiliyarkandom. Priests form these churches visited at the time of necessary to Rajamudy to bless and pray for the believers. And among the migrant families who were the RC backgrounds and others, Sri. Pappachan, Vadakel, Sri. Chandikunju, Paikada, Sri. Thommachan Punnakuzhi and Kuttikattu families were the leading believers who took the initiatives for establishing an exclusive church at Rajamudy for the Syro-Malabar believers. Thus separating land for church (mostly by Vadakel family about 3 acres) in 1969 onwards the Church (RC) came to establishment at Rajamudy with holy mass (Was not on all weekdays, on Sundays and occasional important ceremonial days). Fr. Mathew Pothanamuzhy was the first vicar of CR Church. Along with the afore-referred leading people, few families started working on the lands in support of the church’s economical needs to be met. It's great and unique thing that the families worked without taking money or they never desired for the same counting equally their communal prerequisite. The Olickal family’s works and others in growing the coconut trees and other trees and black pepper vines and all would never be forgotten. Thus since then the Church being progressively grown and developed to its present status of "Rajamudy’s Raja" in terms of providing basic infrastructural and other facilities to Rajamudy located at the heart of Rajamudy town. Now the church has more than 280 active families and 1000 believers. It is the one and only episcopal or pontifical or papal kind church at Rajamudy.

=== CMS Church ===
The CMS (Church Mission Society-Anglican Church) at Rajamudy (Presently shifted to opposite of the De-Paul school) is one of the oldest worshiping centers of Rajamudy, perhaps the gathering can be stated back even before CR Church. The church was established by the early migrant-Christian families who belong to Cheramar Christian or Converted Christian group. It was started in the late 1960s by few families in their houses as home-gathering and later separating land the gathering came to existing as a church in 1978. The leading families of early and present congregation are Pottankulangarayil, Mudayananickal, Cheenkallel, Vazheparambil, Panamthottathil etc. and their efforts was the real accordance in behind the establishment of the church. There are 27 families under this church with around 150 active members.

=== Indian Pentecostal Church (IPC) ===
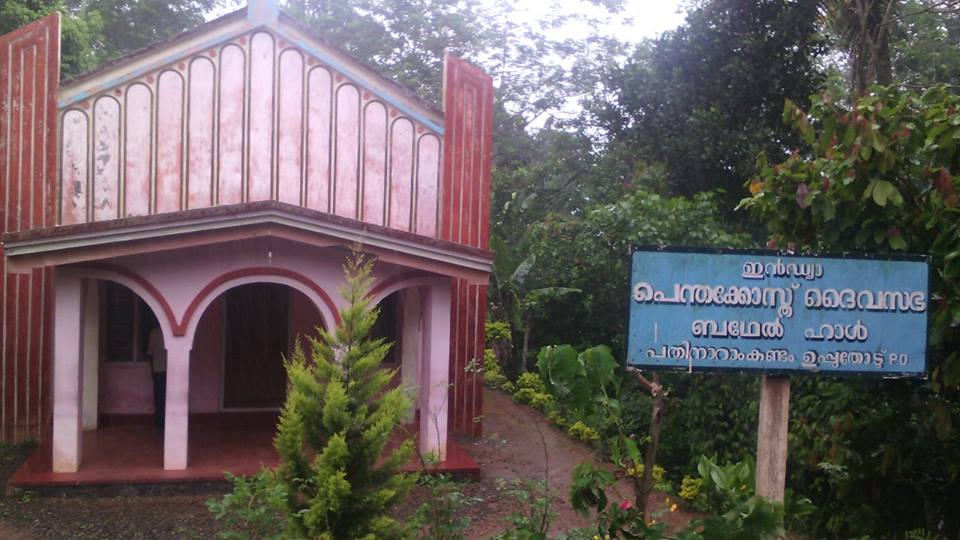
The India Pentecost Church

Though the IPC as Church with its own building cannot claim the existence or history as of other two prominent denominations’ churches, the gathering and prayers started in earlier 1970s onwards. The prayer and its beliefs or doctrinal teachings were started in home-gathering on Sundays and infrequent for house-prayers or cottage-meetings. The pastors (Church leader) visit to the believers’ houses often for prayer common (House visit) and special prayers (Fasting prayers) etc. The Church is now located on Rajamudy-Pathinaramkandom road side around 890 meters away from Rajamudy in its own building from 1990s onward with more than 50 families and around 200 members.
