= Idukki (disambiguation) =

Idukki is a district in the Western Ghats in Kerala state, southern India with its capital in Painavu.

Idukki may also refer to:

- Idukki township, a township in the district
- Idukki Dam, Kerala, India
- Idukki (Lok Sabha constituency), an Indian federal parliamentary constituency in Kerala
- Idukki (State Assembly constituency), one of the 140 NiyamaSabha electoral colleges in Kerala
- Syro-Malabar Catholic Eparchy of Idukki (Eastern Catholic diocese, Chaldean = Syro-Oriental Rite)
