= Civil Station, Idukki =

District in India

Idukki has an area of 4,358 km^{2} and is the largest District of Kerala. Rugged mountains and forests cover about 97 percent of the total area of the District. The district borders the Kerala districts of Pathanamthitta to the south, Kottayam to the southeast, Ernakulam to the northeast and Thrissur to the north and Coimbature, Dindigul and Theni District s in Tamil Nadu to the east.

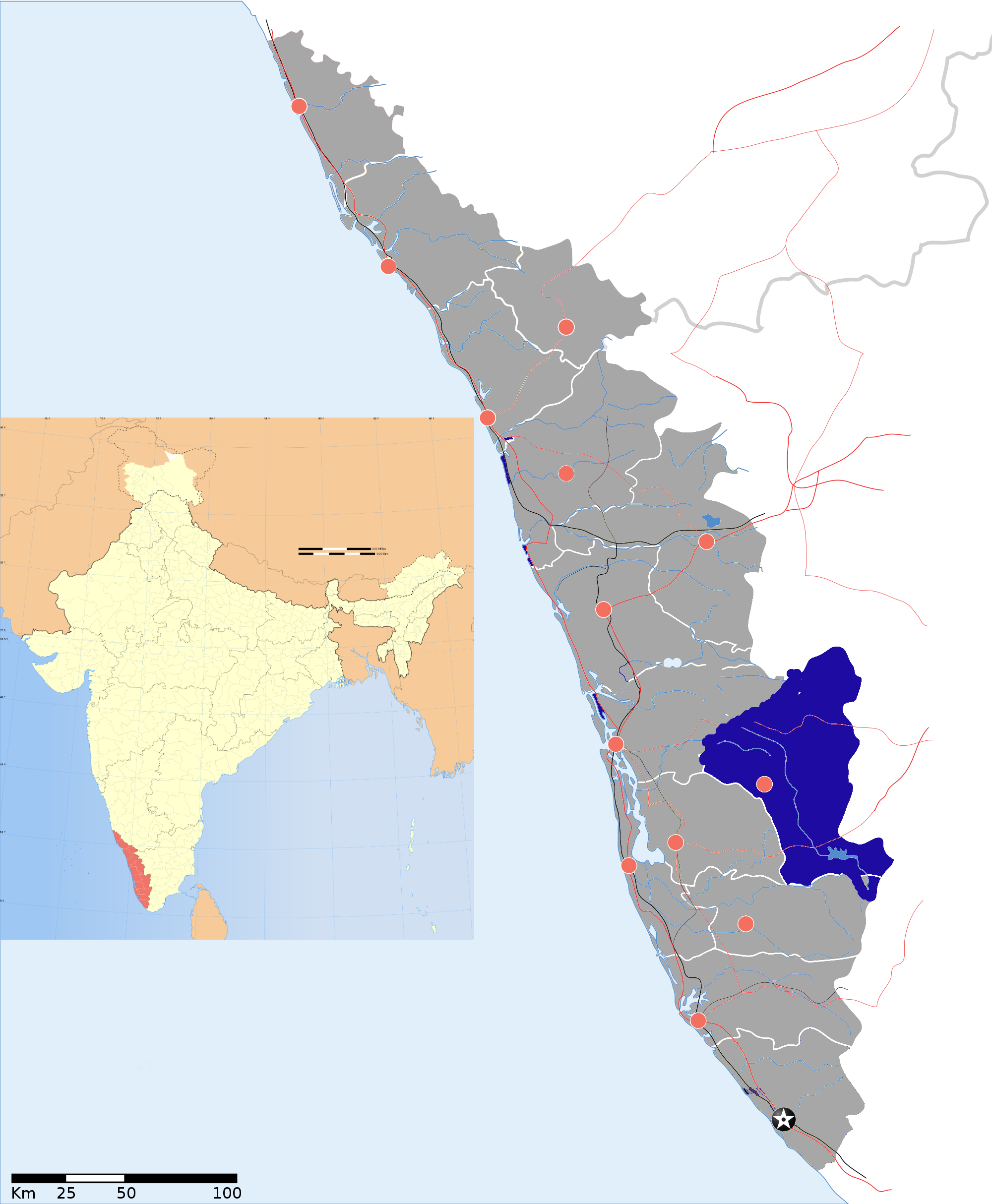
Idukki district and town in Kerala

The District headquarters, Civil Station is situated at Kuyilimala, Painavu. Kuyilimala literally translates to the Cuckoo ('Kuyil')hills ('mala'). There is also a Mini Civil Station.
