= Ramakkalmedu =

- Hill Station
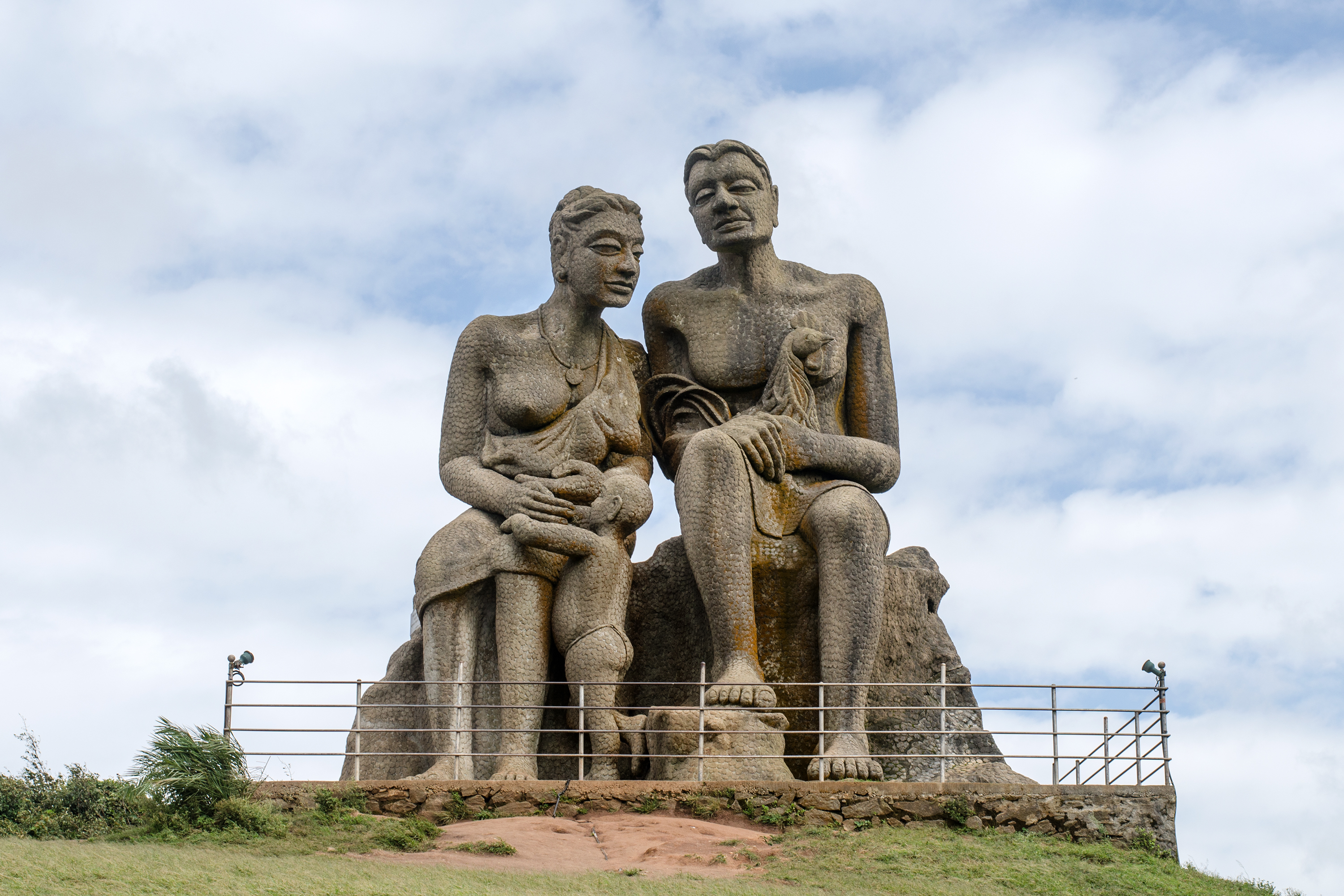
- Statue of Kuruvan & Kuruthi at Ramakkalmedu
- Interactive map of Ramakkalmedu
- Coordinates: 9°47′59″N 77°14′14″E
- Country: India
- State: Kerala
- District: Idukki

Government
  - Type: Panchayath
  - Body: Karunapuram & Nedumkandam grama panchayath
- Elevation: 981.07 m (3,218.7 ft)

Languages
  - Official: Malayalam, English
- Time zone: UTC+5:30 (IST)
- Postal code: 685552
- Area code: 04868
- Vehicle registration: KL-69, KL-37

Ramakkalmedu is a hill station and a hamlet in Idukki district in the Indian state of Kerala. The place is noted for its panoramic beauty and numerous windmills.

== Location ==
It is located about 15 km from Nedumkandam on the Munnar-Thekkady route. Nearby towns are Thookkupalam (5 km), Kattappana (25 km), and Kumily (40 km).

== Geography ==
Ramakkalmedu stands tall in the western ghats at a height of 3,500 ft (1,100 m) above sea level.

== Flora and fauna ==
The ecosystem of the area consists largely of grass land Shola forest type which is laced by sporadic bamboo forests.

== Climate ==
Constant wind is a defining characteristic that sets Ramakkalmedu apart. The area experiences a consistent wind speed of approximately 35 kilometers per hour year-round, regardless of the season or time of day.

== Wind Energy ==
Villages such as Pushpakandam and Kuruvikanam near Ramakkalmedu are home to the second wind energy farm installation in Kerala. While these installations are on private holdings, they collectively have a current capacity of approximately 14.25 MW, utilizing NEG MICON Wind Mills. The electricity generated here is distributed to the Kerala State Electricity Board. Despite Ramakkalmedu being known as one of Asia's largest wind-blown areas, its potential for electricity generation remains largely untapped.

== Tourism ==
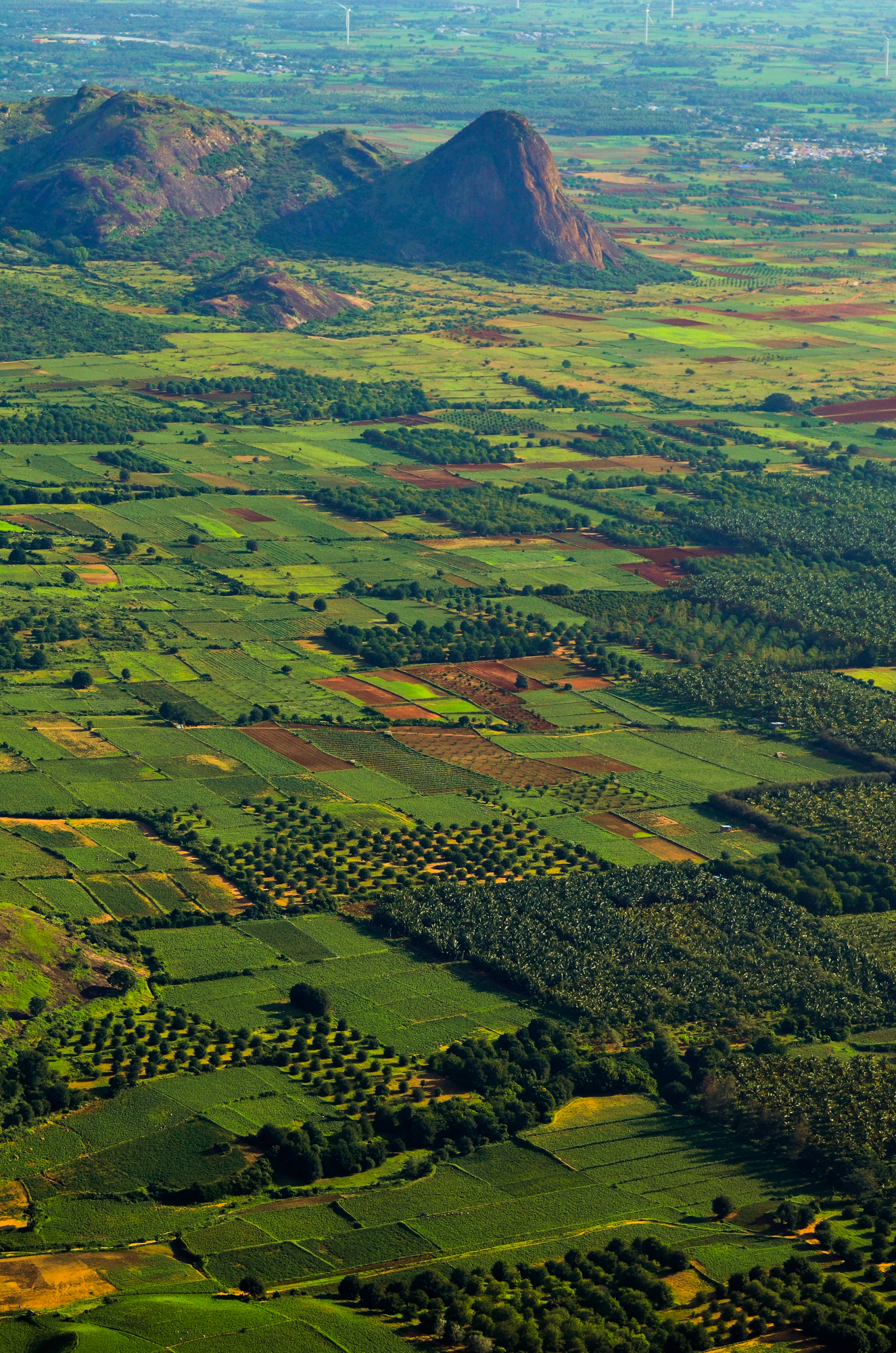
View from Ramakkalmedu

Although Ramakkalmedu has the potential to become an international tourist destination and already attracts more than 100,000 visitors, as of 2015, not much had been done to improve basic facilities in the area. The government of Kerala has announced plans to develop this tourist destination by improving transportation facilities with buses, upgrading the Kerala police, and taking other measures. Tourist attractions such as Tortoise Rock, Kuravan Hills, Rama Rock, Wind Mills Viewpoint, Soolapara Hill, and Hyderamala Hills are all part of the Ramakkalmedu tourism circuit.

== Kuravan and Kurathi ==
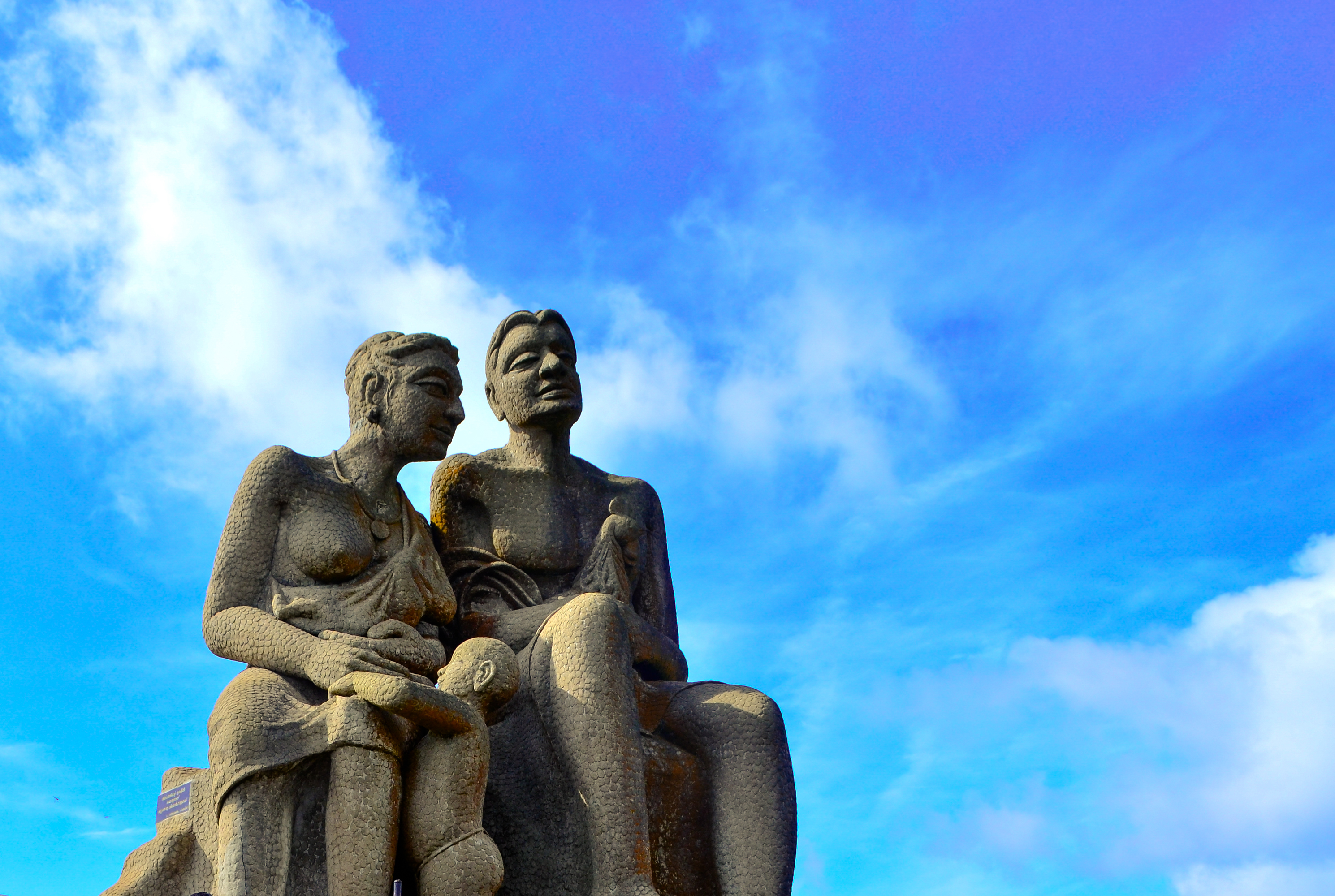
Kuravan and Kurathi statue, Ramakkalmedu

Ramakkalmedu is a historic site with a monument to Kuravan and Kurathi, a large statue that depicts the Sangam Period and Sangam landscape of Kerala and Tamil Nadu. The monument provides a panoramic view of Tamil Nadu villages and towns, including Cumbum, Theni, Kombai, Thevaram, Uthamapalayam, Bodinaykannor, and Vaiga. Rolling green hills and the fresh mountain air make Ramakkalmedu an enchanting retreat. The view is striking at dusk when all these towns in Tamil Nadu are lit up.

Ramakkalmedu, the name of the place, literally means "Land of Rama’s Stone" or "Land where Rama set his holy foot" (Rama is a Hindu deity in the epic Ramayana). One story suggests that Rama, accompanied by his younger brother Lakshmana, set his foot at the top of Ramakkalmedu in search of his wife Sita, who had been abducted by the rakshasa king of Lanka, Ravana.

The Twin Statue was sculpted by C.B. Jinan and erected on the hill's summit in the year 2005. This statue depicts two historical characters with a connection to the construction of the Idukki Dam. The Idukki Arch dam links two massive rock hills named Kuravan Mala (Kuravan Hill) and Kurathi Mala (Kurathi Hill).

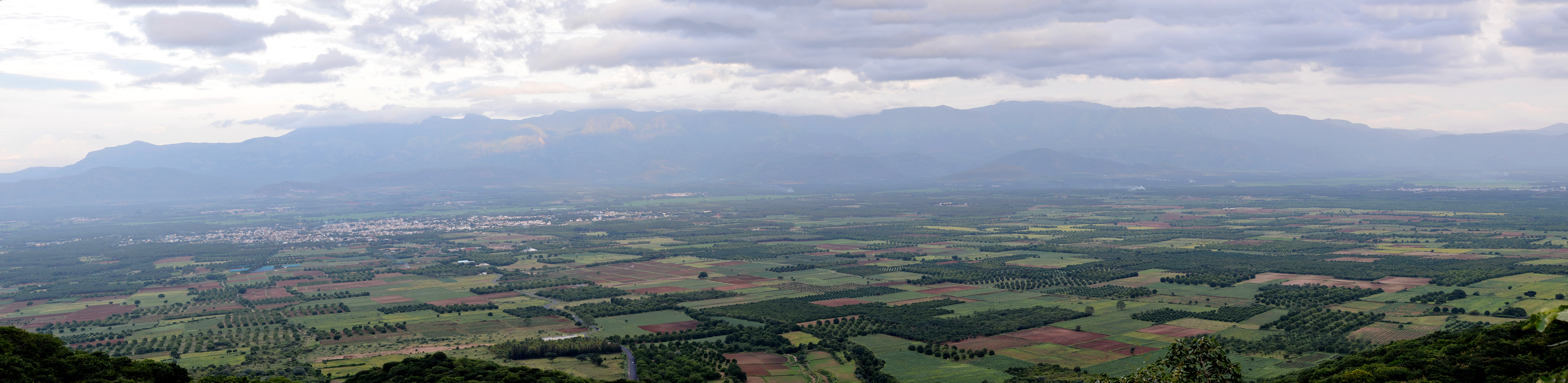
View of Tamil Nadu, from Ramakkalmedu

== Gallery ==
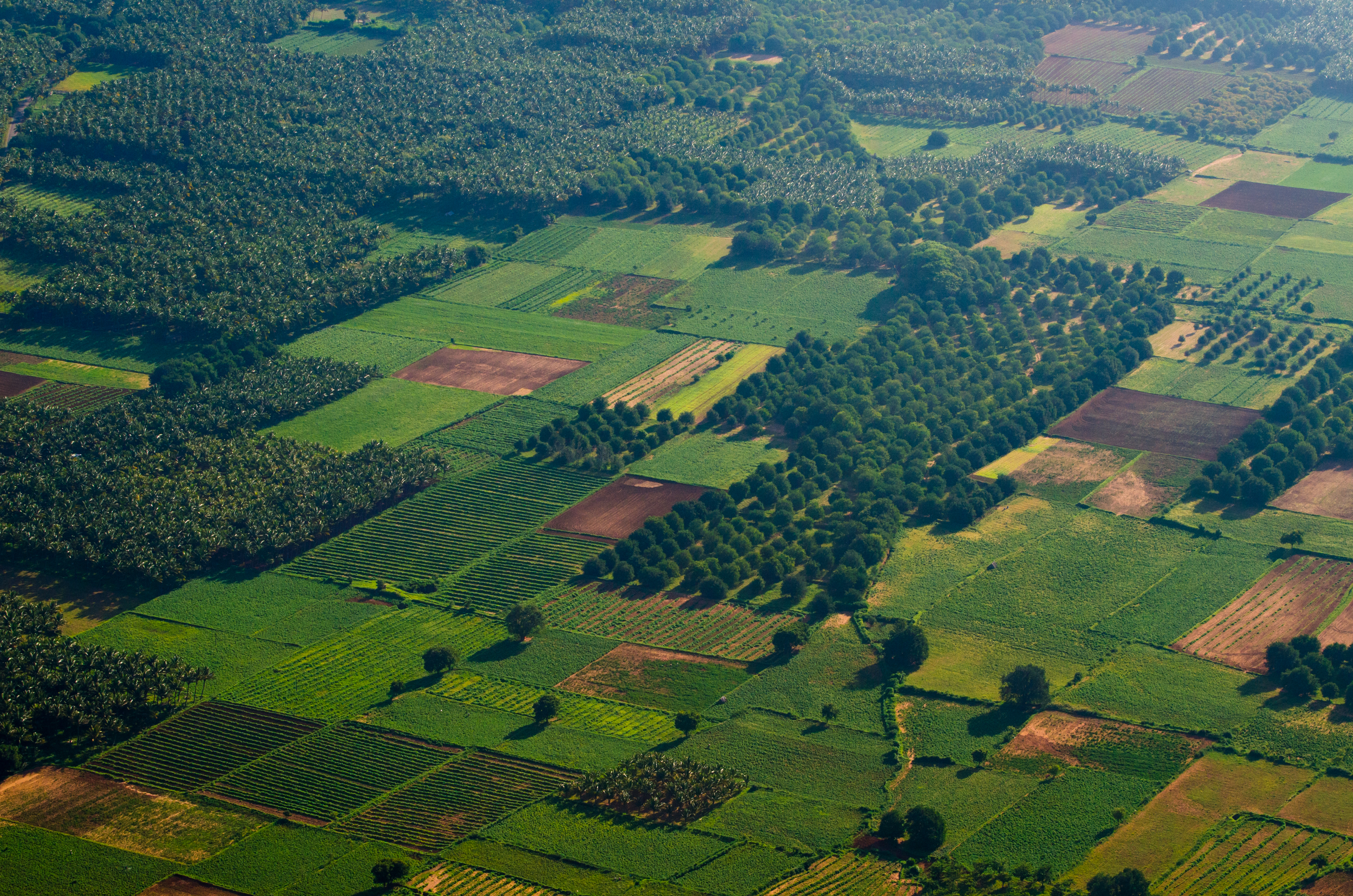
view from ramakkalmedu

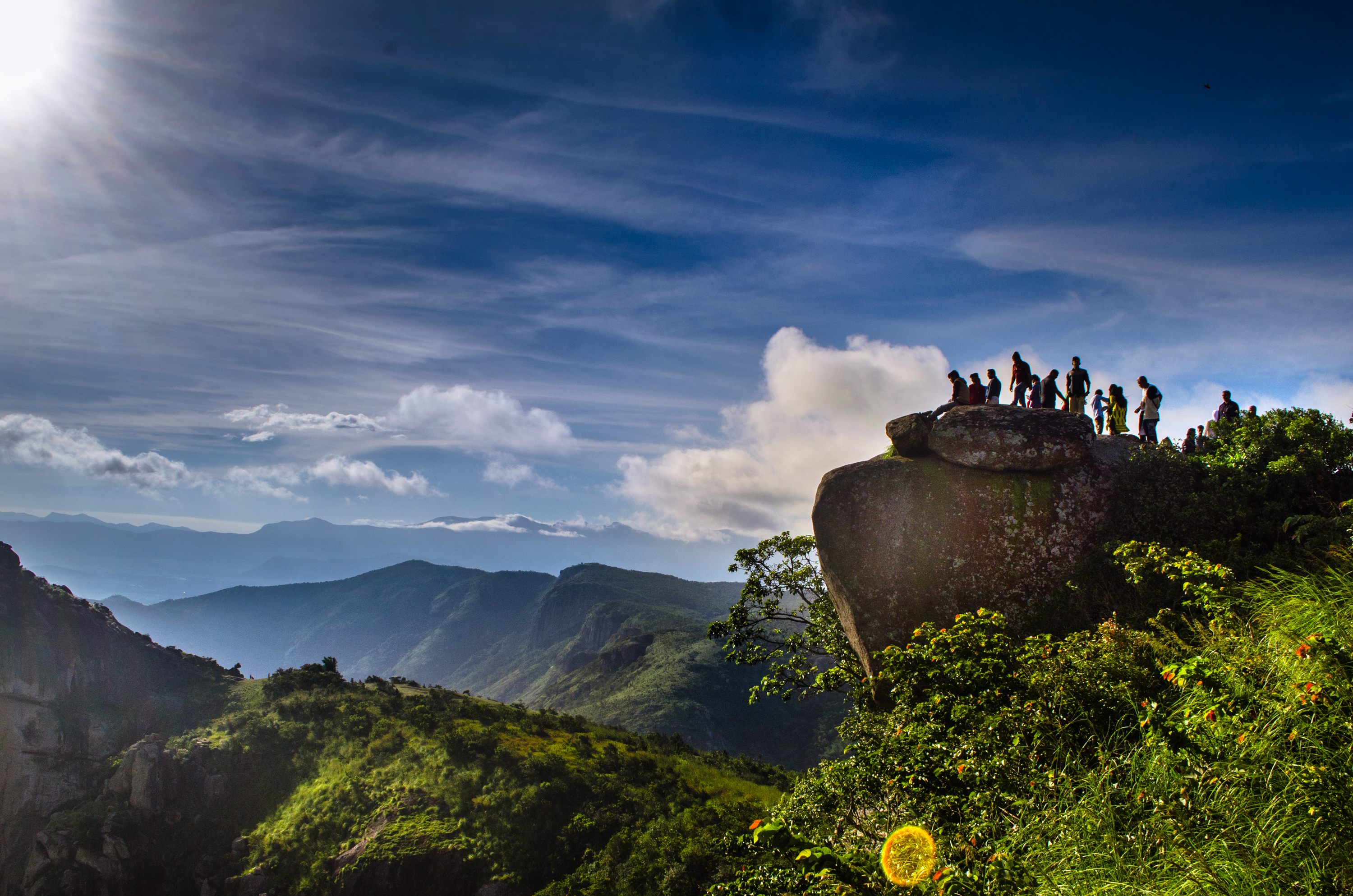
ramakkalmedu viewpoint

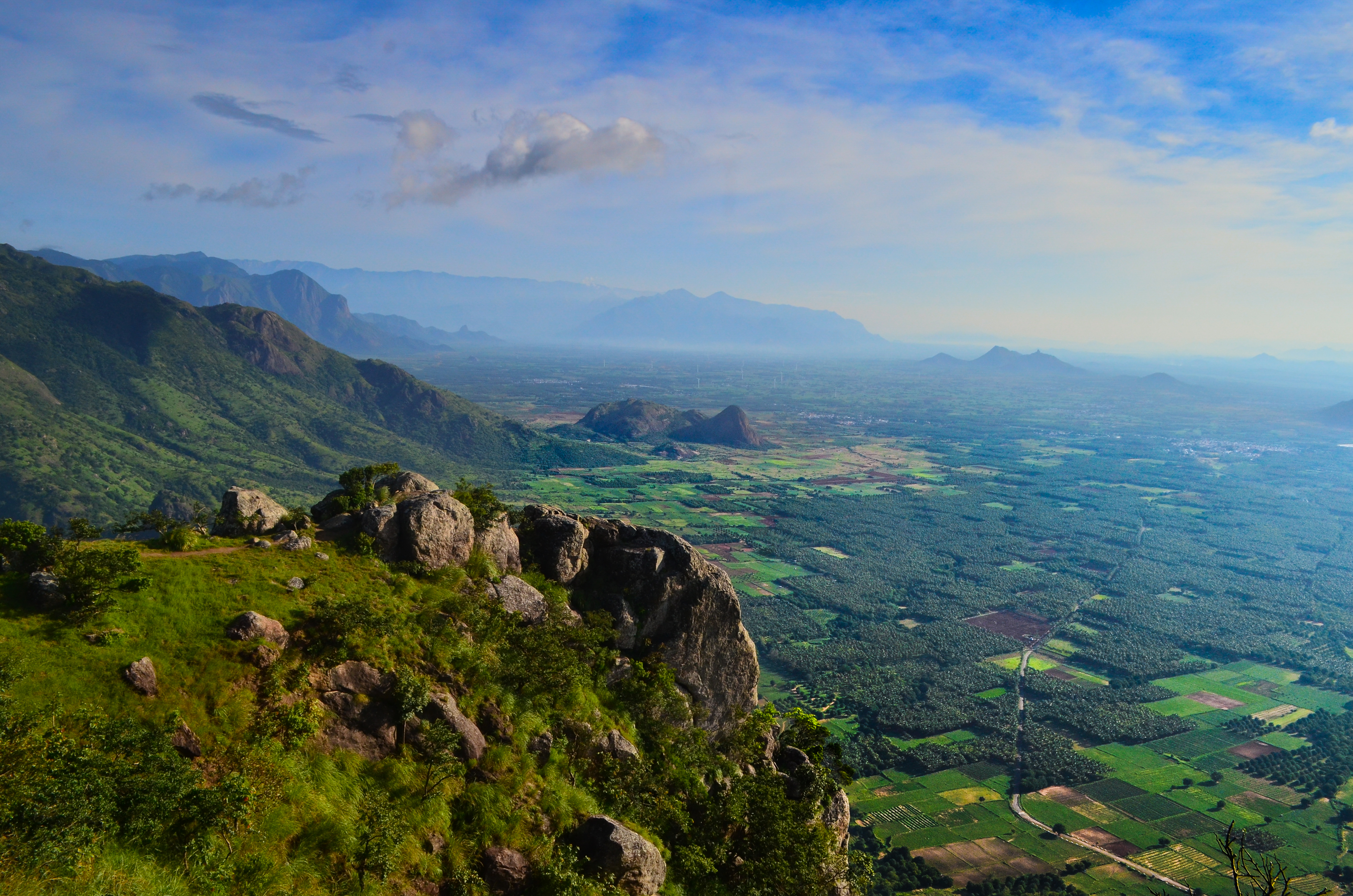
view of tamilnadu from ramakkalmedu viewpoint

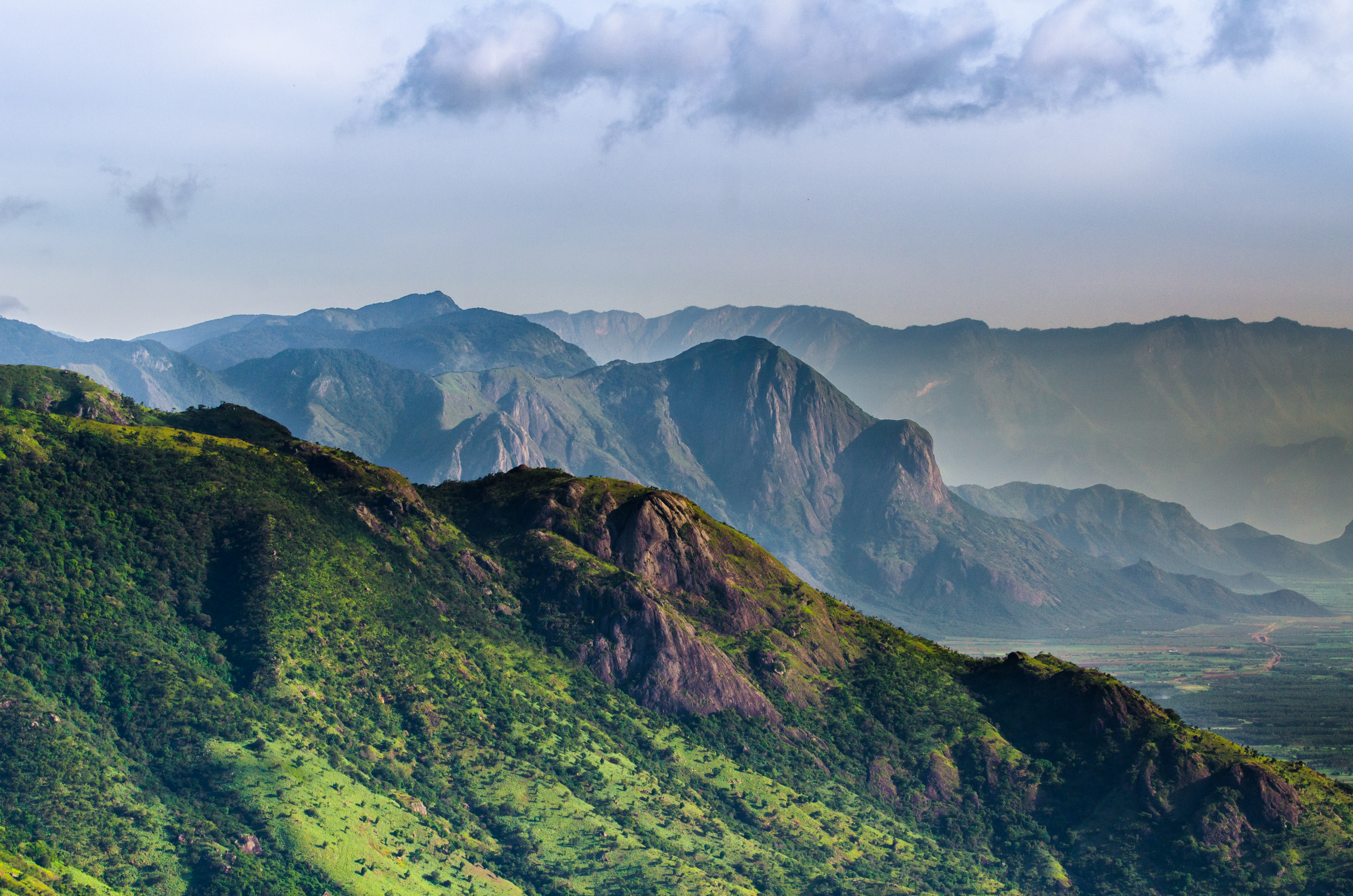
view from ramakkalmedu viewpoint

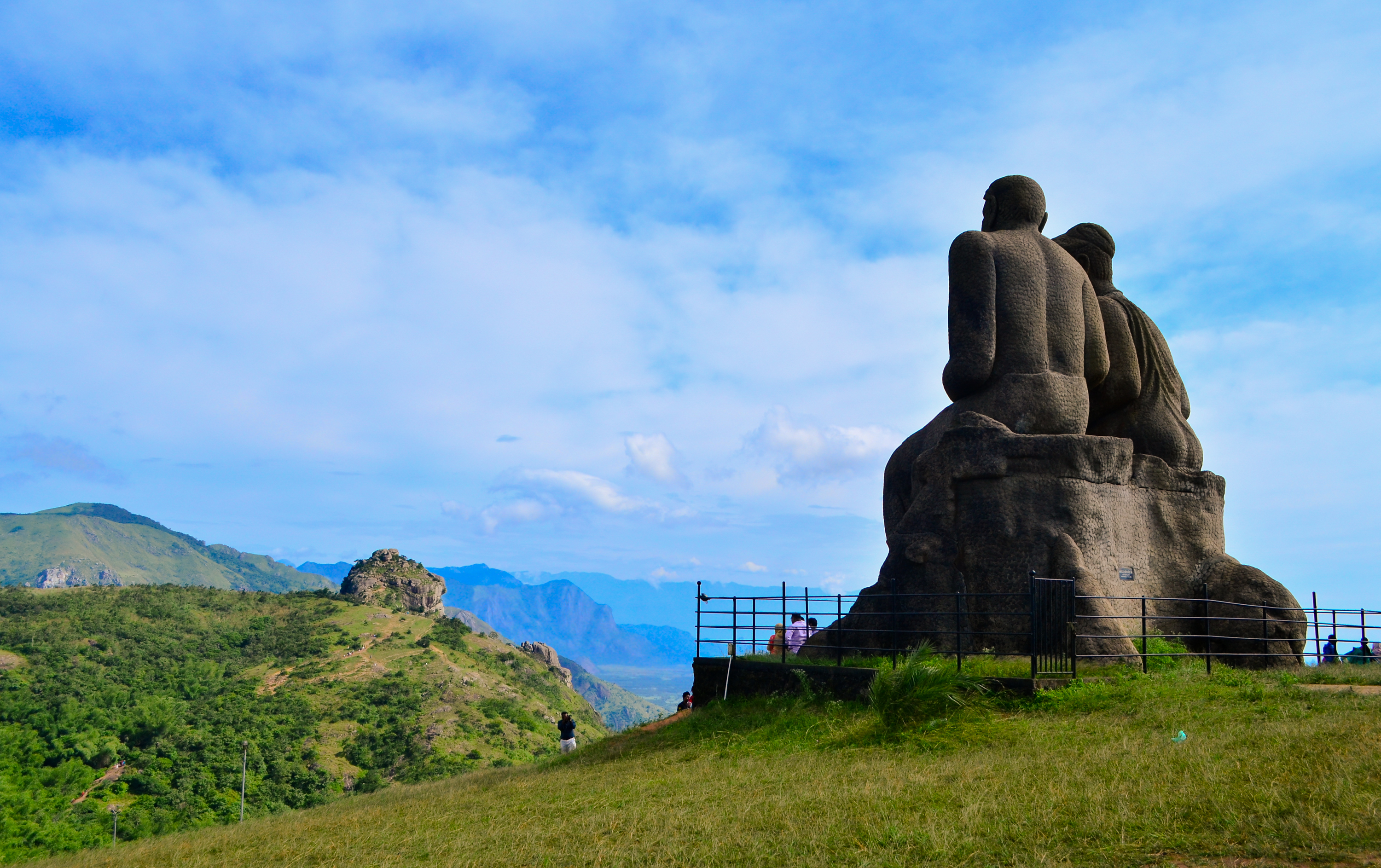
kuravan kurathi statue, ramakkalmedu

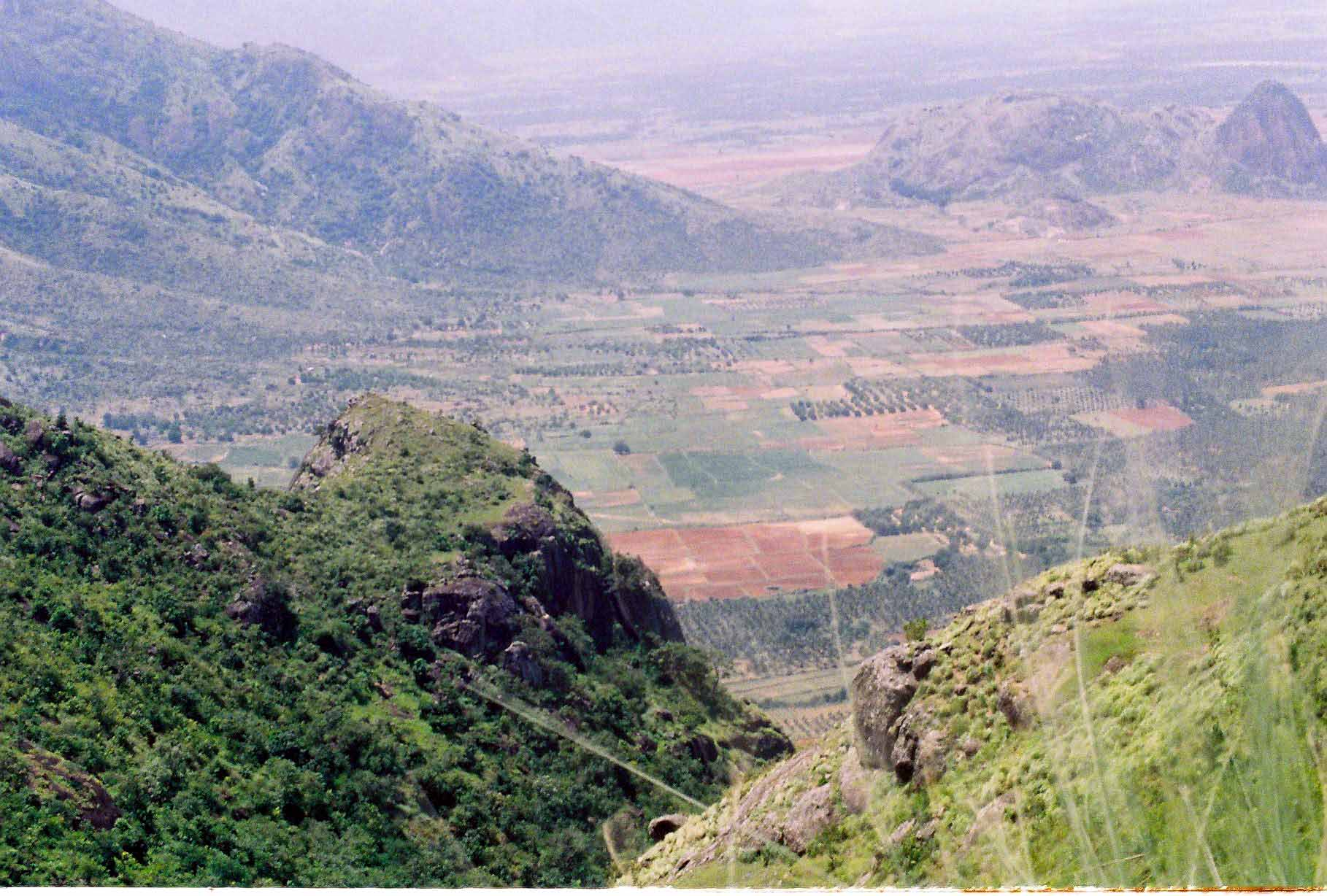
Views from Ramakkalmade

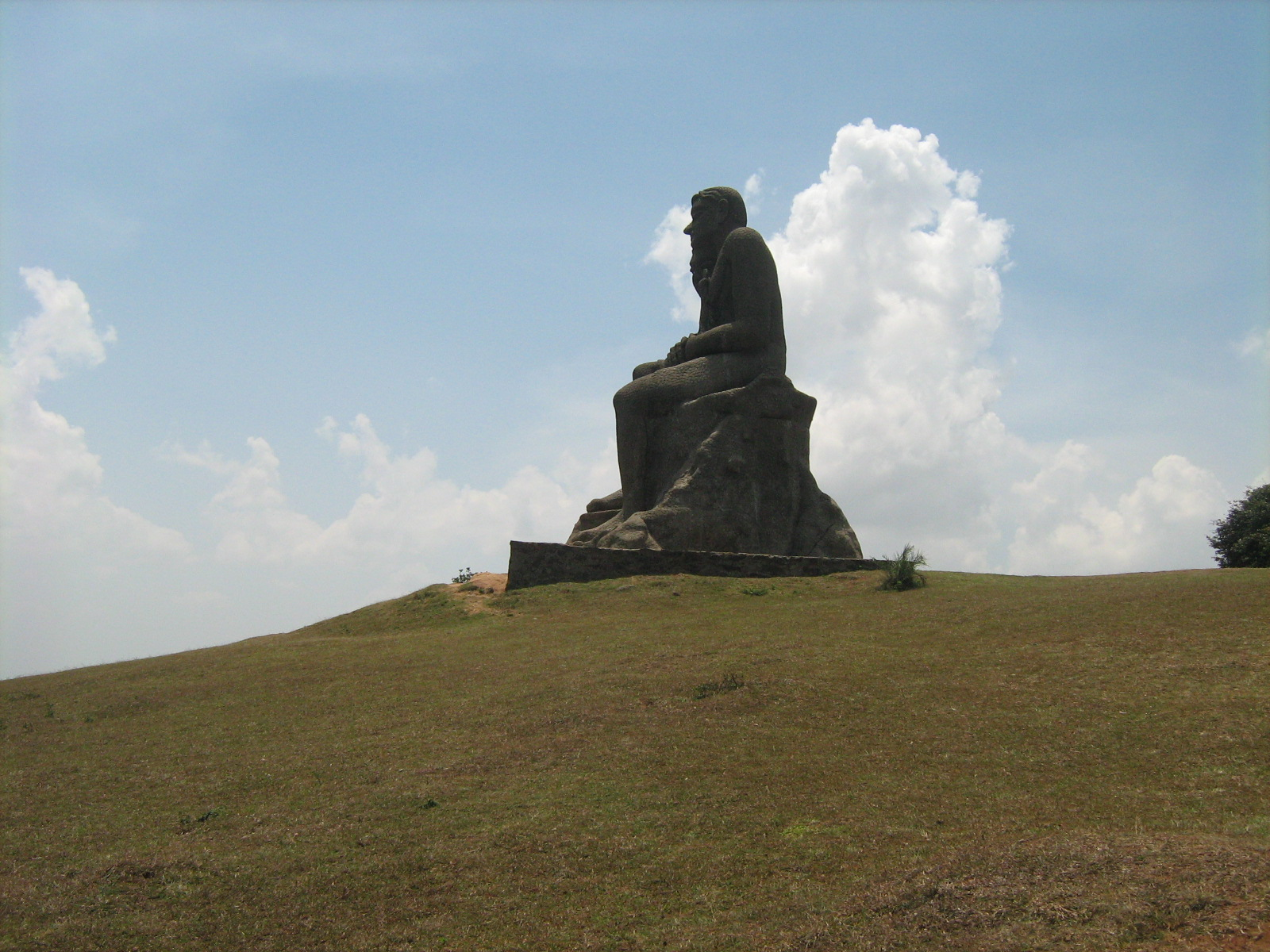
Side view of Kuravan and Kurathi

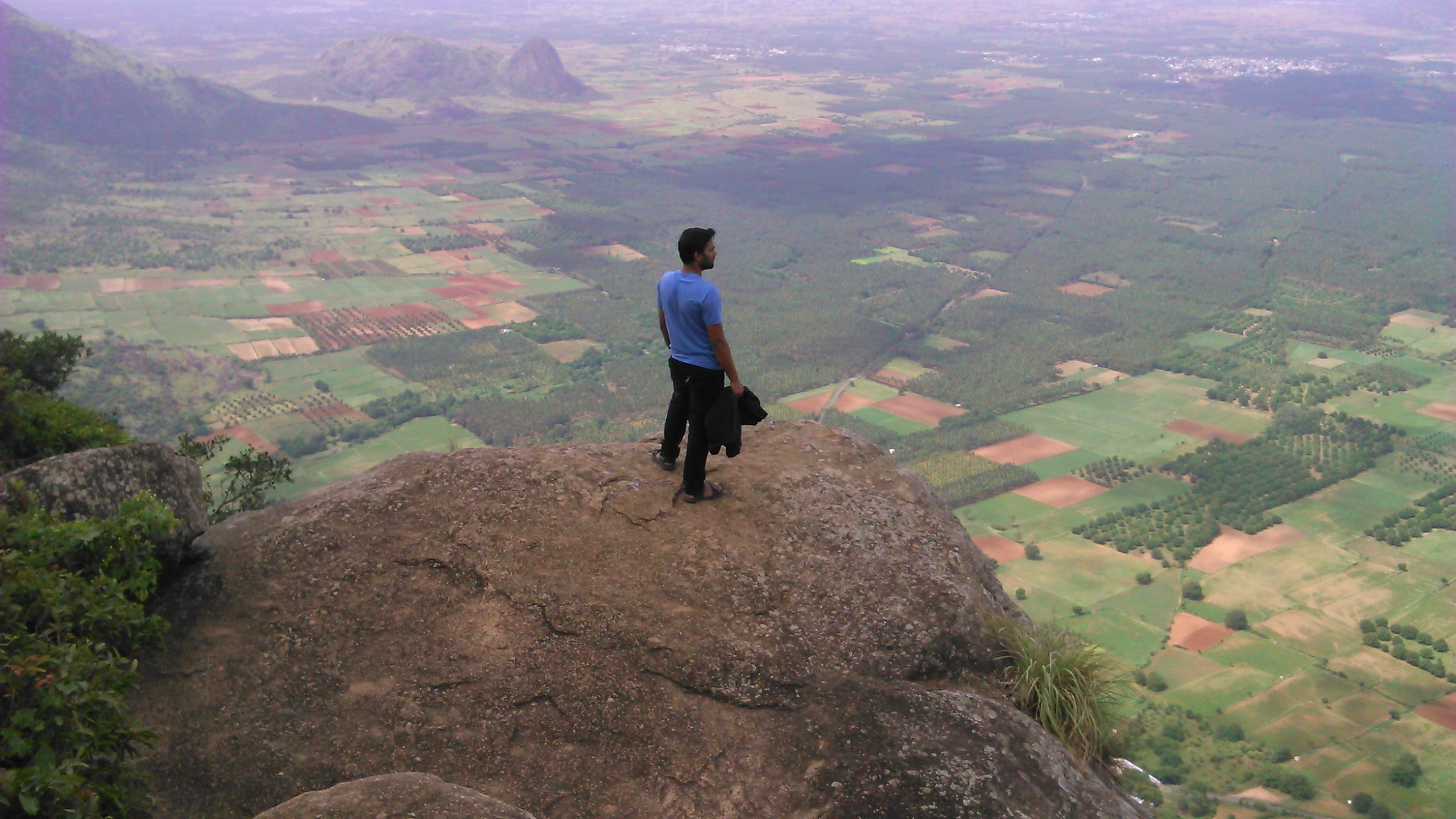
Tourist at Ramakkalmedu viewpoint

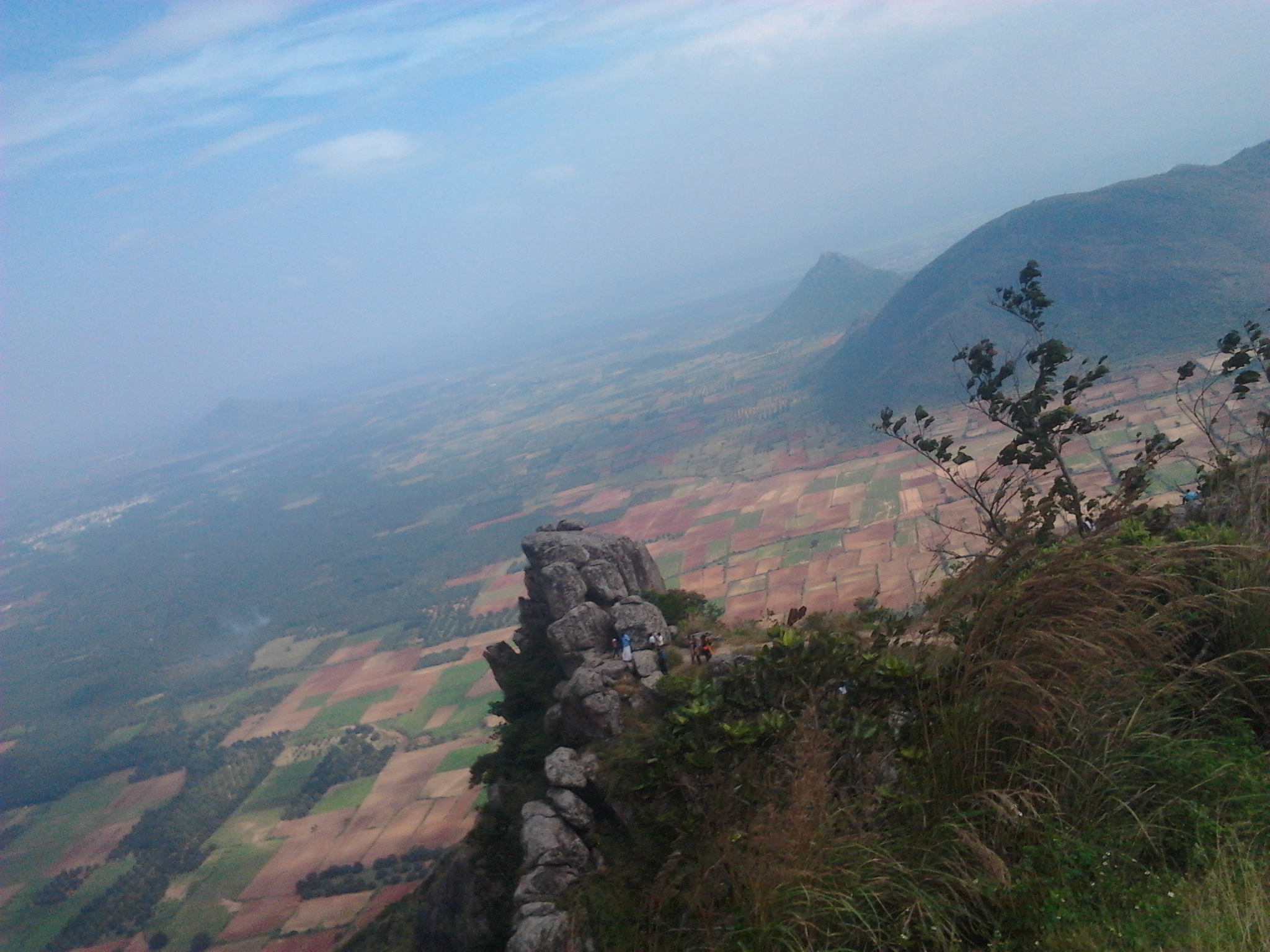
an outcrop of rock jutting to tamilnadu scenery

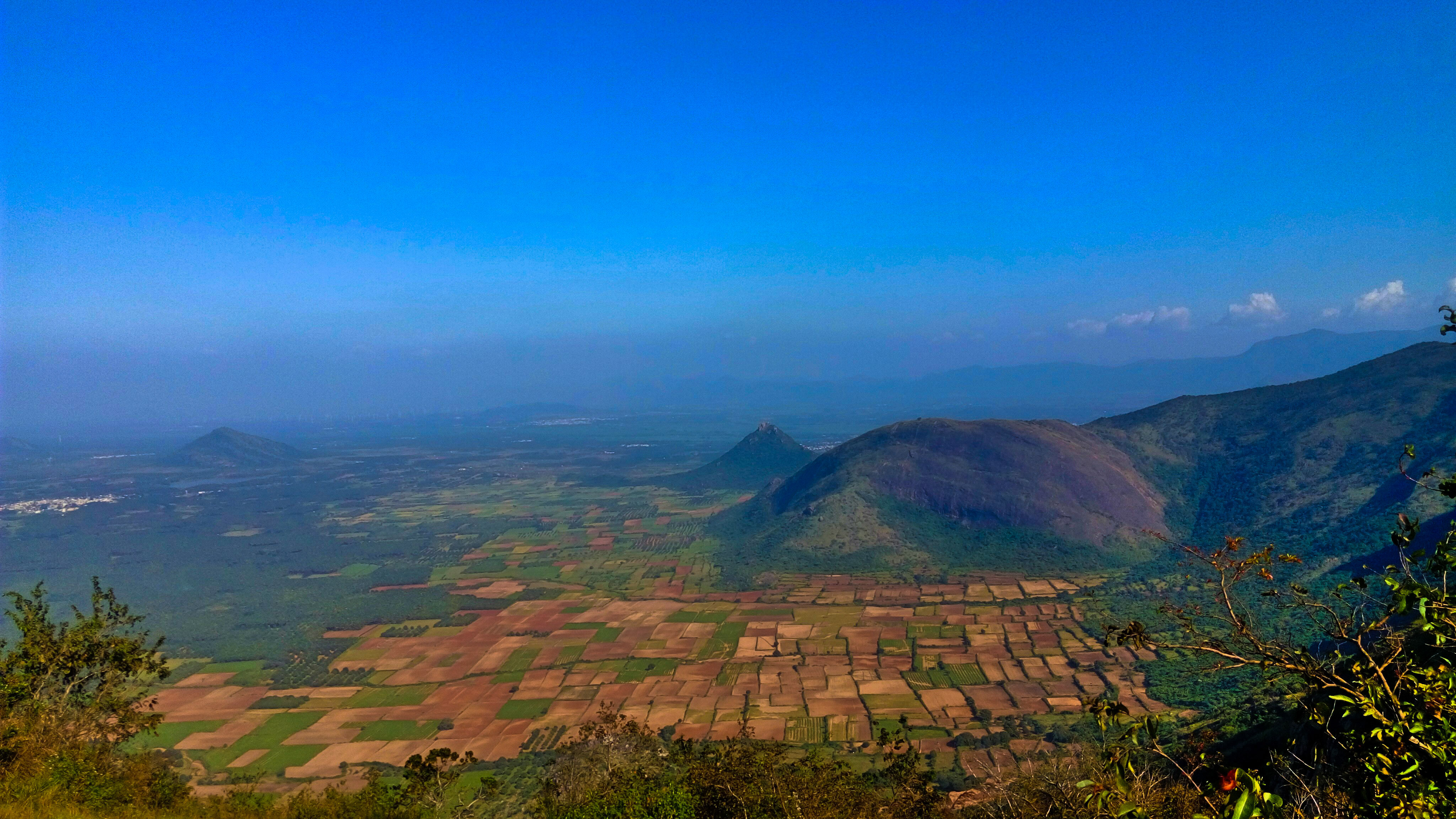
View of Tamil Nadu from Ramakkalmedu
