= Government Engineering College, Idukki =

College in Idukki District, Kerala, India

- Logo
- Other name: GECI
- Type: Government College
- Established: 2000
- Affiliations: APJ Abdul Kalam Technological University
- Principal: Dr. Baiju Sasidharan
- Director: Directorate of Technical Education, Kerala
- Students: 1000+
- Location: Kuyilimala, Painavu, Idukki, Kerala, India; 9°50′52″N 76°56′32″E
- Campus: 25 acres (100,000 m^{2})
- Website: www.gecidukki.ac.in
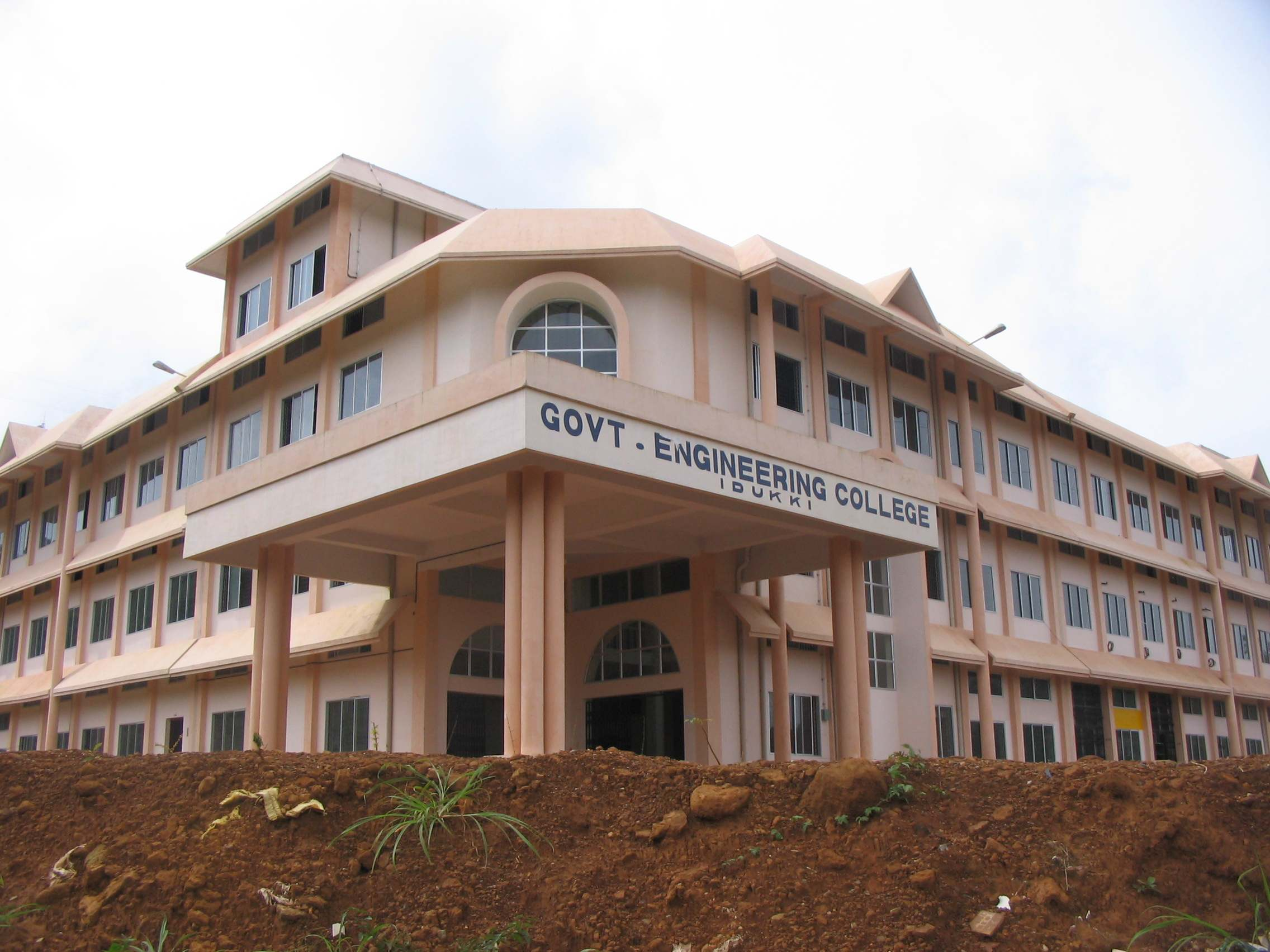

The Government Engineering College, Idukki (GECI) is located in the town of Painavu, in Idukki district of the Indian state of Kerala. It is affiliated to the APJ Abdul Kalam Technological University, and is approved by the All India Council for Technical Education (AICTE), New Delhi. The institution is under the Directorate of Technical Education (DTE), Government of Kerala.

== History ==
The college was established in 2000 under the Directorate of Technical Education of the government of Kerala. The college was inspected and approved by AICTE in April 2003. Government Engineering College, Idukki, was founded to provide technical education to students in the hilly regions of Kerala. It started operations in 2000 with just two undergraduate programs. Over the years, it has expanded its academic offerings to include more undergraduate and postgraduate programs across various disciplines of engineering and technology. The college operates under the administrative control of the Government of Kerala, following the curriculum prescribed by the Kerala Technological University (KTU).

== Campus ==
The 25-acre (100,000 m^{2}) campus is located at Kuyilimala, Painavu – the headquarters of the Idukki district and is situated near State Highway 33.

Key features of the campus include:

- Central Computing Facility
- Research Laboratories
- Auditorium and Seminar Halls
- Indoor and Outdoor Sports Facilities

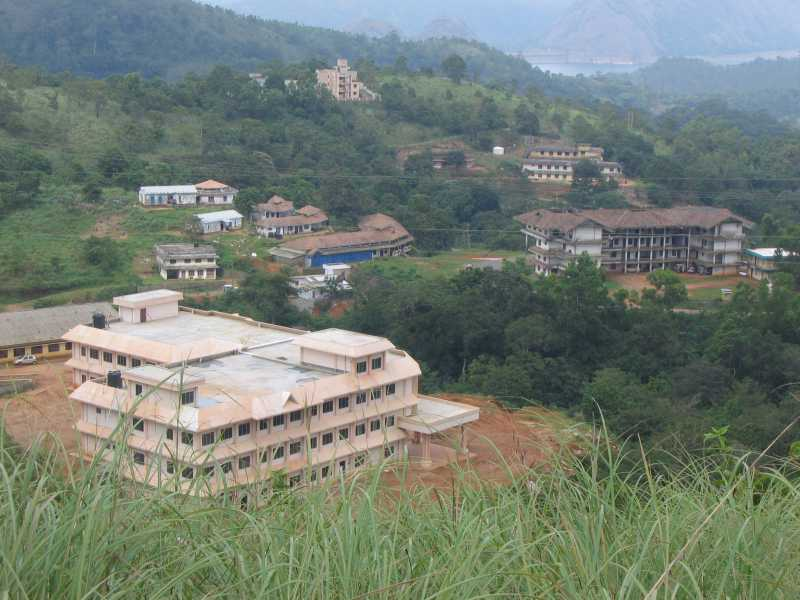
GEC Idukki and government offices at Kuyilimala

== Admissions ==
Admissions to the B.Tech Degree programs are carried out on the basis of rank in the common entrance examination conducted by the Government of Kerala.

Admissions to the M.Tech Degree programs are carried out on the basis of rank in the GATE conducted by the IITs.

== Academics ==
GECI offers undergraduate (B.Tech) programs in disciplines such as:

- Computer Science and Engineering
- Electrical and Electronics Engineering
- Electronics and Communication Engineering
- Mechanical Engineering
- Information and Technology Engineering
- Robotics and Artificial Intelligence

Similarly, offers postgraduate (M.Tech) programs in disciplines such as:

- Power Electronics and Control
- Computer Science and Systems Engineering
- Network Engineering
- VLSI and Embedded Systems

The college follows a semester-based curriculum with a strong emphasis on practical learning, research, and innovation. The programs are accredited by the All India Council for Technical Education (AICTE).,

== Research and Collaborations ==
GECI actively promotes research and development in engineering and technology. The institution collaborates with various industries and research organizations to facilitate knowledge exchange and practical exposure for its students. It also hosts technical symposiums, hackathons, and workshops to enhance the research culture among students and faculty.

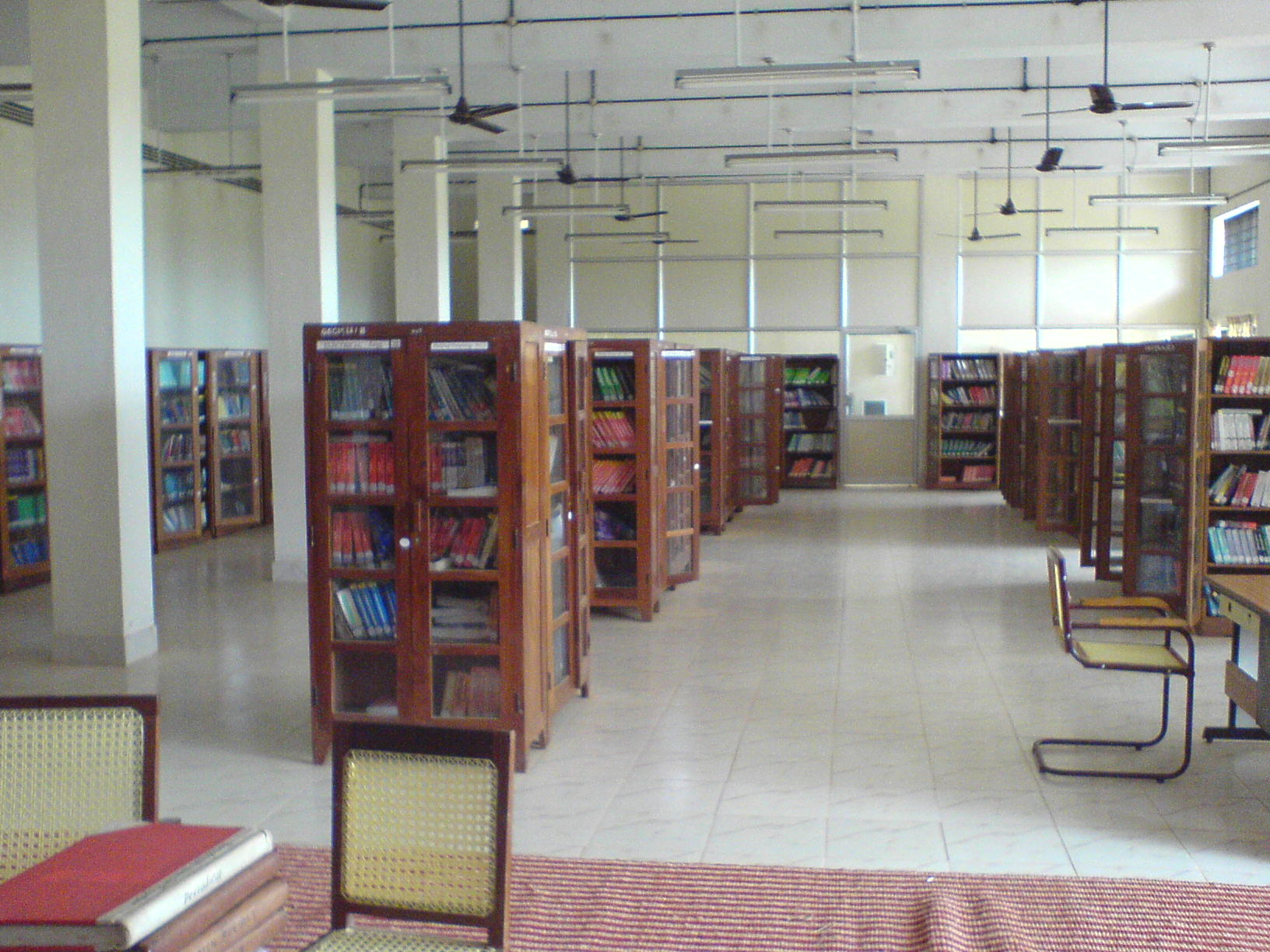
Library – book lending section

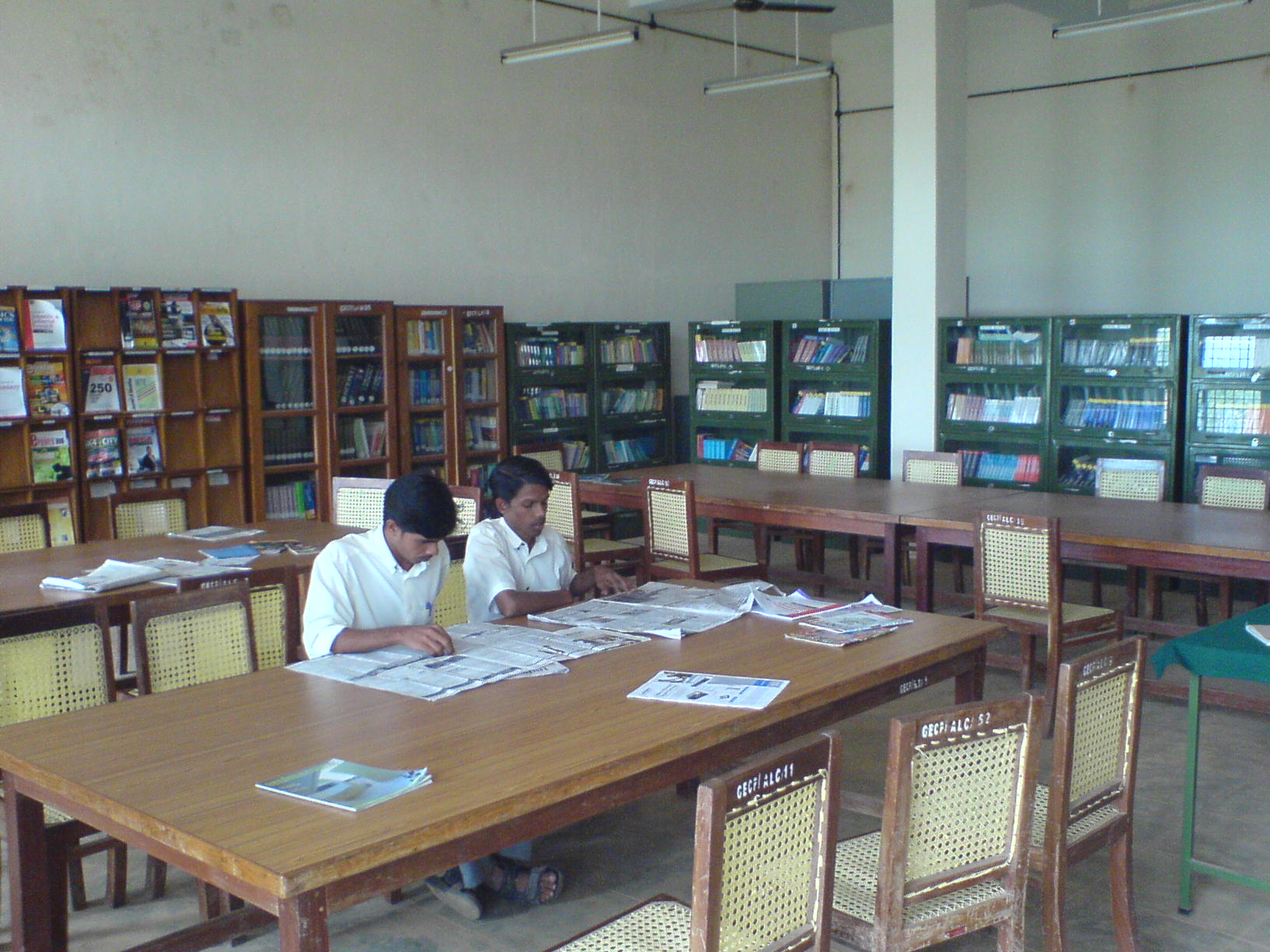
Library – Reference Section

== Digital library in engineering ==
The college has access to international journals and technical papers through the Indian National Library in Engineering (INDEST) -AICTE Consortium.

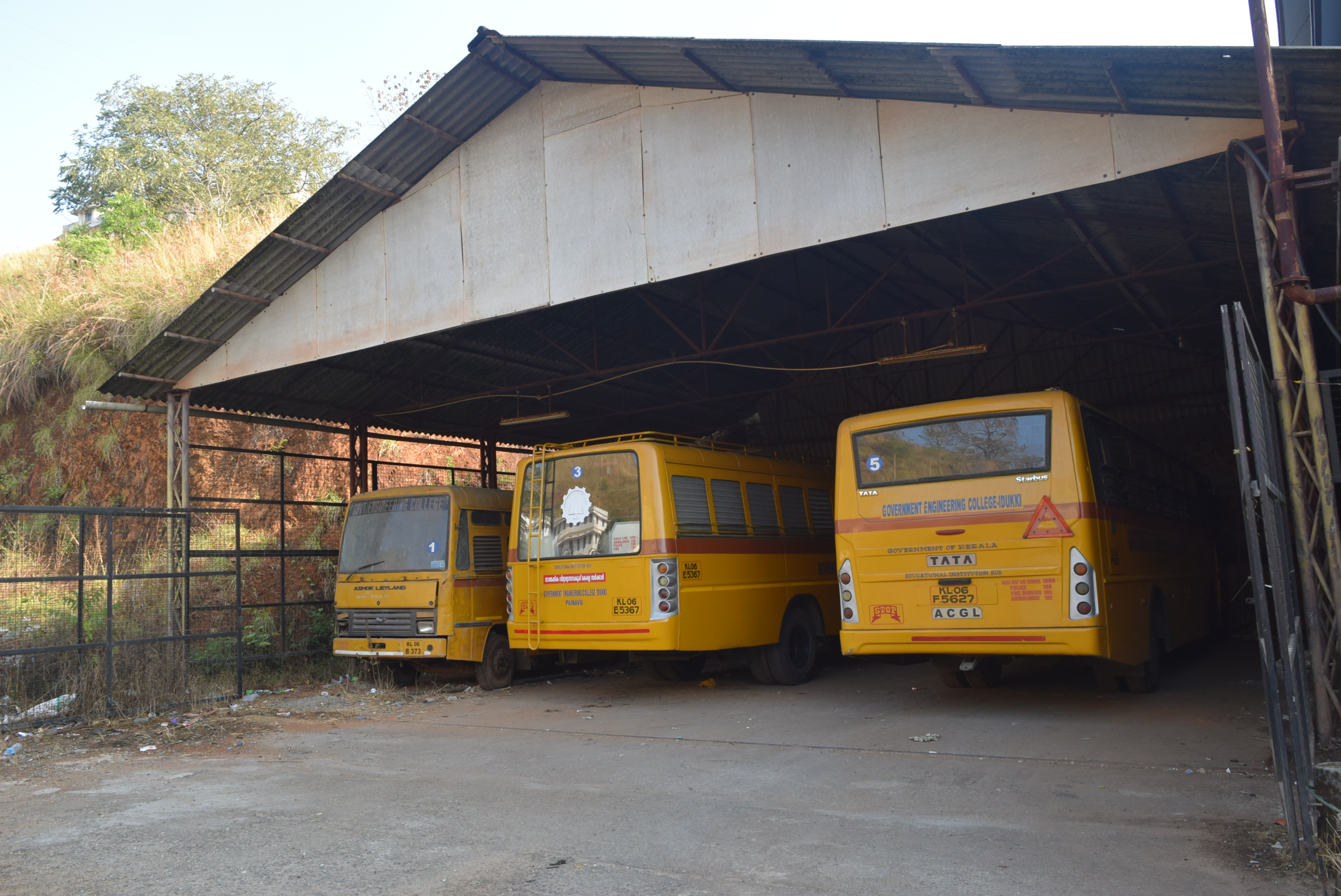
College Buses

== See also ==
- Engineering education
