= Vathikudy Gram Panchayat =

Vathikudy
- Gram panchayat
- Location in Kerala, India Vathikudy (India)
- Coordinates: 9°54′30″N 77°0′30″E
- Country: India
- State: Kerala
- District: Idukki

Population (2011)
  - Total: 26,359

Languages
  - Official: Malayalam, English
- Time zone: UTC+5:30 (IST)
- Website: www.murickassery.org

Vathikudy is a Gram panchayat in Idukki district in the Indian state of Kerala.The main two town of Vathikudy Gram panchayat is Thopramkudy and Murickassery.

== Demographics ==
As of 2011 India census, Vathikudy had a population of 26359.

== Education ==
- Pavanatma College, Murickassery
- Mar Sleeva College, Rajamudy
- Gov. Higher Secondary School, Thopramkudy
- Gov. Higher Secondary School, Pathinaramkandam
- St.Marys Higher Secondary school, Murickassery
- Depaul Public School, Rajamudy
- Marian Senior Secondary School, Marygiry
- Auxilium English Medium School Kanakakkunnu
- St.Maria gorethi LP School Thopramkudy
- Holyfamily U P School Kiliyarkandam, Thopramkudy
- Christhuraja LP School, Rajamudy
- S.H UP School, Padamugham
- St. Marys UP School Udayagiri, Thopramkudy
- St. Jacobs UP School Bathel, Thopramkudy

== Health ==
- GOV PHC, Pathinaramkandam
- Alphonsa Hospital, Murickassery
- Velamkannimatha Hospital, Thopramkudy
- Amala Hospital, Thopramkudy
- Govt. Homeo Hospital Vathikkudy
- SH Clinic, Thopramkudy
- Our Family Clinic, Thopramkudy
- GOVT. AYURVEDA DISPENSARY VATHIKUDY

== Banking ==
- Federal Bank, Thopramkudy
- Union Bank Of India, Thopramkudy
- South Indian Bank, Murickassery
- Canara Bank, Murickassery
- I D C B Bank, Thopramkudy
- I D C B Bank, Murickassery
- Service Co operative Bank, Thopramkudy
- Service Co operative Bank, Murickassery
- Service Co operative Bank, Rajamudy
- Service Co operative Bank, Chembakappara
- Muthoot Fincorp Ltd, Thopramkudy
- Muthoot Fincorp Ltd, Murickassery
- Muthoot Finance, Murickassery
- Kosamattam Finance, Thopramkudy
- Kosamattam Finance, Murickassery

== Others ==
- Sub- Registrar Office, Thopramkudy
- Sub - Treasury, Murickassery
- Village Office, Murickassery
- KSFE, Thopramkudy
- Govt.Veterinary Hospital, Murickassery
- Govt.Veterinary Hospital, Thopramkudy
- Police Station, Murickassery
- KrushiBhavan, Murickassery
- Panchayath Office, Murickassery
- KSEB Section Office, Murickassery
- Dairy Extension Office, Thopramkudy,
- BSNL, Thopramkudy
- BSNL, Murickassery
- VFPCK, Thopramkudy
