= Kuzhikandom =

Coordinates: 9.765°N 77.195°E

- village
- Interactive map of Kuzhikandom
- Country: India
- State: Kerala
- District: Idukki

Languages
  - Official: Malayalam, English
- Time zone: UTC+5:30 (IST)
- Vehicle registration: KL-

Kuzhikandom is a small village in the Idukki district of Kerala, India. The population is approximately 2,000, with 99% dependent on farming.

The village is known for its production of cardamom, pepper, jackfruit, coffee, tea, and vanilla.
