= Thookkupalam =

- village
- Location in Kerala, India Thookkupalam (India)
- Coordinates: 9.813222°N 77.198534°E
- Country: India
- State: Kerala
- District: Idukki
- Founder: Pattom Thanu Pillai

Government
  - Type: Panchayath
  - Body: Karunapuram grama panchayath

Languages
  - Official: Malayalam, English
- Time zone: UTC+5:30 (IST)
- Telephone code: 04868
- Vehicle registration: KL-69

Thookupalam is a village about 10 kilometres (6.2 mi) from the Kerala-Tamil Nadu border in the Idukki district of Kerala, India. It lies on the banks of river Kallar and is one of the main tourist hubs between Thekkady, Munnar and Ramakkalmedu.

Thookupalam is one of the spices trading centres in Idukki district. The place is situated on the Thekkady-Munnar road near the Ramakkalmedu windmill project. The main crops cultivated in the area include cardamom, black pepper, Cocoa, and coffee. Thookkupalam is well known for the Sunday market of vegetables, fruits, domestic animals, and many agricultural products. This is one of the developing villages of Idukki.

The main mode of transport in Thookkupalam is road. Kerala State RTC and Tamil Nadu STC services are also available 24/7.
