= Mutholapuram =

Muthalapuram Muthalapuram
- village
- Location in Kerala, India Muthalapuram (India)
- Coordinates: 9.864687°N 76.566467°E
- Country: India
- State: Kerala
- District: Ernakulam

Government
  - Type: Panchayath
  - Body: Elanji Grama Panchayath

Languages
  - Official: Malayalam, English
- Time zone: UTC+5:30 (IST)
- PIN: 686665
- Telephone code: 0485
- Vehicle registration: KL-17
- Nearest city: Piravom
- Lok Sabha constituency: Kottayam
- Vidhan Sabha constituency: Piravom
- Climate: Moderate (Köppen)

Muthalapuram is a village in Ernakulam district Muvattupuzha Taluk in the Indian state of Kerala. It is a small village/hamlet in Muvattupuzha Taluk in Ernakulam District of Kerala, India. It comes under Elanji Panchayath. It belongs to the Central Kerala Division. It is located 42 km towards East from District headquarters Kakkanad. 8 km from Pampakuda. 182 km from the State capital Thiruvananthapuram.

Muthalapuram Pin code is 686665 and the postal head office is Elanji.

Thirumarady ( 6 km ), Palakuzha ( 7 km ), Piravom ( 10 km ), Arakuzha ( 12 km ), Pampakuda ( 12 km ) are the nearby Villages to Mutholapuram. Muthalapuram is surrounded by Uzhavoor Taluk towards South, Kaduthuruthy Taluk towards west, Muvattupuzha Taluk towards North, Lalam Taluk towards East .

Piravom, Koothattukulam, Muvattupuzha, Thodupuzha, Palai, and Vaikom are the nearby cities to Muthalapuram.

This Place is on the border of the Ernakulam District and the Kottayam District. Kottayam District Monippally is South towards this place.

Sree Muthalapuram Mudhevar Temple is one of the most ancient and prominent Trimurti temples in Kerala, and is located here. This is why Muthalapuram was formerly known as Mudevarpuram.

The Vijnan Institute of Science and Technology (VISAT), an engineering college established in the year 2011, is 2 km away from this town. The engineering college is AICTE approved and affiliated to Mahatma Gandhi University. This college comes under the Vinjyan Charitable Trust.

St.Paul's HS is also located here. Thekkemadam Sree Bhadrakali Shetram is located here.

== Institutions ==
- Muddevar Temple
- Ayurveda Hospital
- Thekkemadam Sree Bhadrakali Shetram
- Vijnan Institute Of Science And Technology (VISAT)
- Post Office
- Service CO-Operative Bank
- Veterinary Hospital
- St. Sebastians Church
- St. Paul's High School

== Notable people ==
- Jeethu Joseph, film director
