= Thopramkudy =

- Village
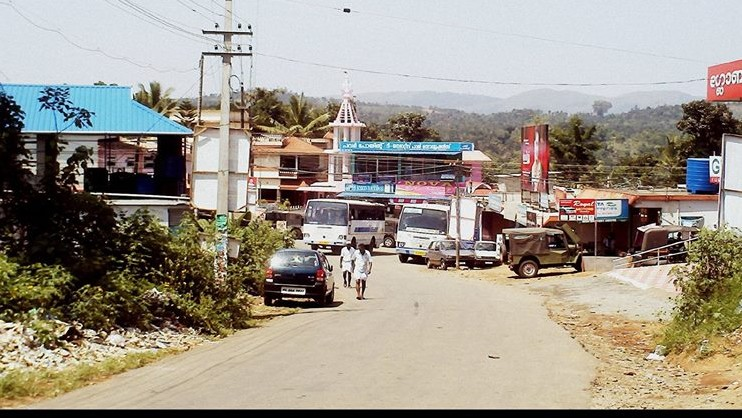
- Thopramkudy Town

- Location within Kerala Location within India
- Coordinates: 9.881454°N 77.053566°E
- Country: India
- State: Kerala
- District: Idukki

Government
  - Type: Panchayati Raj (India)
- Elevation: 1,500 m (4,900 ft)

Languages
  - Official: Malayalam, English
- Time zone: UTC+5:30 (IST)
- PIN: 685609
- Telephone code: 914868
- Vehicle registration: KL-06
- Nearest Railway Station: Ernakulam (Aluva)

Thopramkudy (alternately spelled Thoprankudy) is a village in Vathikudy Gram panchayat, in Idukki Taluk located in Idukki district in the State of Kerala in South India. Spread over an area of 27.94 km^{2} (10.79 sq mi), it is one of the spices market in the state of Kerala. The town has a tropical climate with temperatures ranging from highs of 34.4 °C (93.9 °F) in the summer to a low of 16 °C (61 °F) in the winter, with a healthy rainfall of 3,040 mm (120 in). State Highway 40 (Kerala) and State Highway 42 (Kerala) and a new highway Kalvary Mount-Munnar is passing through Thopramkudy. The hamlet is mentioned in the 2009 Malayalam movie Loudspeaker

== Etymology ==
The name 'Thopramkudy' might have come from two words, thopran (which is the name of a tribal leader) and kudy (which means colony). It is believed that he was the first man to do cultivation and his place/house came to be known as Thoprankudy and eventually it changed to Thopramkudy.

== History ==
Most of those farmers who had migrated to Thopramkudy and its environs consisted mainly of Catholic Christians. On 12 November 1969, a temple dedicated to Shri Dharmasashta was established to serve the spiritual needs of the Hindus. 60 years ago Sree Dharma Sastha Temple (Ayyappa) was established by the Tribals (Anakootil Krishnankutti, Karikallil Kuttan, Kelan Raman (Mannathiparayil), Thandel Kuttappan, etc.). From 1959 on, the said temple lay under the protection and jurisdiction of the great association of hill tribals. As for Christian settlers, Kiliyarkandam church served their needs. When people began to migrate in large numbers, the establishment of a church at Thopramkudy became inevitable.

== Transportation ==
Thopramkudy is well connected with other major cities and towns in kerala.state State Highway 40 (Kerala) State Highway 42 (Kerala) and a new tourist Highway Calvary Mount - Munnar is also proposed through Thopramkudy .Thopramkudy is a connector of major cities and towns in Kerala and Tamil Nadu like Adimaly - Kattappana - Kumily, Nedumkandam - Kochi, Munnar - Thiruvananthapuram, Nedumkandam - Thodupuzha, Kochi - Madurai, Alappuzha - Nedumkandam

=== Rail ===
There is no railwaylines in Idukki district. The major railway stations near Thopramkudy are Aluva railway station, Kottayam railway station, Bodinayakkanur

=== Airport ===
The nearest airport is Cochin International Airport Madurai Airport .

== Religion ==
Thopramkudy is all about love and equality. For worshiping there are churches, temples and mosques. 60 years ago Sree Dharma Sastha Temple (Ayyappa) was established by the Tribals (Anakootil Krishnankutti, Karikallil Kuttan, Kelan Raman (Mannathiparayil), Thandel Kuttappan etc..), and it was the first temple in Thopramkudy.

- St. Maria Goretti Town Church, Thopramkudy
- St. Joseph Latin Church, Thopramkudy
- St. Mary's Jacobite Church, Thopramkudy
- Sree Dharma Sastha Temple, Thopramkudy
- Juma Masjid, Thopramkudy
- NSS Karayogam, Thopramkudy
- Sree Narayana Gurudeva Temple, Thopramkudy
- SNDP YOGAM Br :2222 Thopramkudy
- Assisi Retreat Center, Thopramkudy
- St. Jacob's Church Bethel, Thopramkudy
- Holy Family Church Kiliyarkandam, Thopramkudy
- St. Mary's Malankara Church Marygiri, Thopramkudy
- St. Jude Church Kanakakkunnu, Thopramkudy

== Education ==
The first school was Gov. H.S. Thopramkudy.

- Govt. Higher secondary School, Thopramkudy
- St. Maria Gorethi LP School Thopramkudy
- Holy Family U P School Thopramkudy
- Marian Public School Thopramkudy
- Auxilium English Medium School Thopramkudy
- De Paul Public School Rajamudy, Thopramkudy
- Mar Sleeva College of Arts & Science, Rajamudy, Thopramkudy
