= Elanji =

- village
- Location in Kerala, India Elanji (India)
- Coordinates: 9.8348778°N 76.5380573°E
- Country: India
- State: Kerala
- District: Ernakulam

Government
  - Body: Elanji Grama Panchayat
  - President: K.G.Shibu
  - Vice President: Dincy Joji

Population (2011)
  - Total: 16,495

Languages
  - Official: Malayalam, English
- Time zone: UTC+5:30 (IST)
- PIN: 686665
- Vehicle registration: KL-17
- Nearest city: Ernakulam
- Lok Sabha constituency: Kottayam
- Vidhan Sabha constituency: Piravom
- Climate: Moderate (Köppen)

Elanji , also spelt Ilanji, is a village in Ernakulam district, Indian state of Kerala.

== Etymology ==
Elanji was believed to be derived from the word Elavanjiyoor desham. During the passage of time, desham (region) has been dropped off, and Elavanjiyoor became Elanji. Elanji is also the name of a tree (Mimusops elengi) with fragrant blooms commonly found in the Elanji village area.

== Geography ==
The nearest towns are Piravom, Kuravilangad, Koothattukulam, Peruva and Thalayolaparambu. The taluk headquarters at Muvattupuzha is 27 km away. The village lies about 42 km southeast of Kochi, and there are several buses that ply between Pala and Ernakulam, which connect Elanji with Kochi. Elanji is almost the midway point on the Vaikom–Thodupuzha bus route. Elanji lies about 32 km east of Kottayam town. There is a Panchayath bus stand in the heart of the Elanji town itself. Elanji is located in the Ernakulam district and the last grama panchayath towards the eastern border (towards the Kottayam side) of Ernakulam district.

== Demographics ==
As of 2011 census, Elanji had a population of 16,495 with 8,134 males and 8,361 females. The majority of people living in Elanji are Syro-Malabar Catholic Christians.Most inhabitants are engaged in agriculture, farming and trading, with the main cash crops being rubber, paddy, coconut, areca nut, ginger, turmeric, 'kacholam' and pepper.

== Religious institutions ==
The most prominent among the churches is the St. Peter's and St. Paul's Syro-Malabar Catholic Church, established in AD 1300 and belonging to the Diocese of Pala. Other churches include the Mutholapuram church and Xavierpuram (Kooru) church. The St. Peter's and St. Paul's Church is also a forane church.

There are more than 13 temples in Elanji. Mudhevar Temple, located at Mutholapuram, is the oldest, being over 900 years old. There is also a famous Hindu temple in the name of Shiva; the speciality of this temple is that the main door opens to the west direction. This type of Shiva temple is rare in Kerala.

== Education ==
- St. Peter's High Secondary School, Elanji (formerly known as St. Peter's High School, Elanji), one of the oldest and famous high schools in and around Elanji (Monippally, Neezhoor, etc.).
- Vijnan Institute of Science and Technology (VISAT), an engineering college established in the year 2011, is 2 km away from this town. The engineering college is AICTE-approved and affiliated to APJ Abdul Kalam Technological University(KTU). This college comes under the Vinjyan Charitable Trust.

== Notable people ==
- Sister Mary Benigna, poet
- Perumbadavam Sreedharan, novelist
- Jeethu Joseph, filmmaker
- Srikant Murali, film actor and director
