= Mannathara =

- village
- Country: India
- State: Kerala
- District: Idukki

Languages
  - Official: Malayalam, English
- Time zone: UTC+5:30 (IST)
- PIN: 685515
- Telephone code: 04868
- Vehicle registration: KL-
- Nearest city: Cochin a
- Literacy: 100%%
- Lok Sabha constituency: Idukki

Mannathara is a village in the Idukki District of Kerala on the southwest coast of India, located in the high ranges of the Western Ghats (Sahyadri). Mannathara is part of the Vathikudy Gramapanchayath and Idukki Talku. The word mannathra evolves from the name of a tribal group called Mannan. Mannans were the early inhabitants of in the region. It is believed that Mannans migrated from the dry plains of Tamil Nadu in search of livelihood in the hills. They were engaged in mainly hill cultivation of ragi, millet and rice as well as gathering cardamom, hill pepper, honey and other medicinal plants for exchange from the early period. The word Mannathra refers to a burial ground of the Mannan. The village had evidence of megalithic settlement sites. However, the majority of the material pieces of evidence to learn more about the prehistoric and early historic periods are not surviving. However, the ecological settings of this micro-region call attention from paleo-archaeologists. The continuous human intervention started in the mid-twentieth century destroyed most of the historically rich sites.

Up to the late nineteenth century, this area was part of the Western Ghats forest controlled by the Travancore State. With the expansion of the Travancore state power to the hills, state sub-contractors engaged in the collection of forest resources such as honey, cardamom and waxes for the commercial agents of Travancore Government and traders from Tamil plains and Kerala. The tribal groups were incorporated into this process of extraction of forest resources. Later, Cardamom cultivation as a commercial enterprise flourished in the early decades of the twentieth century with the expansion of the market for spices. The place called near Mannathara Kanam refers back to the Elakananm (cardamom plantation) existed in the pre-1980s period. Migration of the peasants in the 1950s and 1960s was the major turning point in the history of this forest hilly region into an agrarian village. The economic depression of the 1930s, the Second World War, and a remarkable increase in the population in the agrarian mid-land forced low holding peasants to clear forest land to cultivate food crops and cash crops. The migrant peasants practised both dryland cultivation of rice, cassava (tapioca), Lemon Grass oil, cardamom, ginger, pepper, and other spices. Landless and smallholding farmers from the erstwhile princely state regions; mainly from Palai, Ettumanoor, Kothamangalam, Thodupuzha, and Melukavu migrated to western Ghats. This was largely connected with the larger project to accelerate the production of 'cash crops'. In the later decades, the entire high range, as Father Vadakkan mentioned in his biography Ente Kuthippum Kitaappum became the backbone of the Kerala Economy.

This village is famous for its high quality black pepper. Black pepper and cardamon from this area had been considered as special quality in the Mattancherry spice market in Cochin. But the leaf disease of black pepper (Kurumulku valli) in the late 1980s onwards was a major backlash to the agrarian change of Mannathara. Moreover, the import of black pepper from other parts of the world to Cochin port and mixing of the imported goods with high-quality pepper from idukki affected the demand of high range pepper in the international market.

In the 1990s as elsewhere in India, Neo-liberal policies of the government affected Mannathara's agro-economy as well. The rollback of the Government of Indian and the State government from the welfare policies for peasants and elimination of subsidy for fertilizers increased the risk of investment. The risk of investment was high in the case of ginger, plantain, and areca nut cultivation. The heavy fluctuations in the climate and various crop diseases increased the burden of the peasants. Cultivation of cassava (tapioca) and rice and milk products were the ways to meet their ends. Milma (APCOS) corporation of the Kerala State Government was a helping hand to the peasants. Nursing as a profession with employment chances attracted the lower-middle-class peasant families. The agrarian crisis of compelled young women to prefer nursing as a profession to support the family. Trained nurses, mostly from Syrian Christian and ezhava families migrated to middle eastern countries, Delhi, Bangalore, Chennai. Now there are a few families has its members in America and England. Daughters of Chennamkulam Pappachan and the son of Paulose Eenthumkal are in the USA. Although most of the lower-middle-class family remain unchanged in their economic condition, some of the families enjoy economic mobility.

== Geography ==
Until the beginning of the 21st century, a long strip of rice field was the landmark and the main attraction of Mannathara. The Swampy land between two hills formed wetland paddy field with a two-meter wide and one and a half meter deep stream called the Mannathara thodu. The Mannathra thodu flowing in the middle of the rice field is the lifeline of Mannathara, which eventually joined the Periyar river. Now the decline in rice production due to various reasons affected the Mannathara rice filed as well. Overflowing of this stream in the heavy monsoon months helps to balance the fertility of this rice field. But the first thing we would have noticed in the last century would have been the poor transport infrastructure of this region. The Government had been largely ignoring the transport development of the region for decades. It is only after 1995, a positive reaction is visible from the side of authorities. Now, Rajamudi-Thoprumkudy main state high way and Mannathara-Perumthotty road are the lifelines of the village. These two tarred roads connect Mannathra with other villages and market places including Kattappana, Murickassery, Cheruthony, and Nedumkandam and connects the region with a larger market place such as Thodupuzha, and Kothamangalam.

Education 'Holy Family Upper Primary School:' The school had its early beginning in the 1950s as an informal learning centre alongside the Holy Family Church. Later, a lower primary government school was established at Kiliyar and the upper primary section continued in the church. The school is popularly known as the Mannathara school. This school has produced a list of distinguished alumni from the neighbourhood of the school. This list of former students include Dr. Justin Mathew Olickal (Professor, Delhi University), Siby Mathew Vattappilil (Engineer Canada), Fr. Jimmy Kuzhikandathil (Christian Priest, Idukki), Fr. Binoy Chathanattu (Priest, Idukki), Dr. Sr. Swapna Mathew Olickal (Medical Doctor, Thiruvananthapuram), Fr. Shinto Mangalathu (Christian Priest), Binish Pathippalil (Manager, Federal Bank), Saji Chennamkulam (School Staff, Rajasthan), and many more.

Pilgrim Fathers Mathew Mathai Olickal (Pappachan) Mathai Mathai Olickal (Kunjunju), Zcharia Ulahannan Chennamkulam (pappachan), Mathai Ulahannan Cehnnamkulam, Varkkey Niravathu, Varkky Mukalayil, Varghese Enthumkal, Varky Mathai Oilckal, Zacharias Manthara, and many more.

Major roads

Roads suitable for motor vehicle transport was developed from the 1980s onward. Most of the tarred roads are PWD or Panchayath maintained. All these roads were initially one-foot tracks developed by the community cooperation of the local people, mostly farmers.

List of Roads Passing through Mannathara: Cheruthoni- Rajamudi-Thopramkudy highway- pass through Mannathara junction

Mannathara Junction- Church-Manthikkvala- Perumthotty- Road- This is one of the main roads passing through the village.

Manthikkavala-Mantharappadi-Kiliyar Road

Kambanippadi-Anganvadikkavala Road- This was a long-abandoned road after the 1970s. Recently, PT Thomas (Ex MP Idukki) included this road in the Pradan matri Grameen Sadak Yojana scheme (PMGSY) and completed the work in March 2017 and opened for traffic. Now this road has become a busy link between Murikkasserry-Rajamud- Padamugham regions to Kiliyar-Prakash-Chempakappara-Kattappana.

Mannathra Rajya Hall-Pathinezhu Kambani road

Panachinanippadi-Kiliyar Road

People Are Knowledge
