= Vazhithala =

- Village
- Location in Kerala, India
- Coordinates: 9°53′0″N 76°38′30″E
- Country: India
- State: Kerala
- District: Idukki

Languages
  - Official: Malayalam, English
- Time zone: UTC+5:30 (IST)
- PIN: 685583
- Telephone code: 04862
- Vehicle registration: KL-38-
- Nearest city: Koothattukulam and Thodupuzha
- Literacy: 100%

Vazhithala is a village in Idukki district in the state of Kerala, India.
