= Padamugham =

- Village
- Location within Kerala Location within India
- Coordinates: 9.900603°N 77.021362°E
- Country: India
- State: Kerala
- District: Idukki
- Elevation: 860 m (2,820 ft)

Languages
  - Official: Malayalam, English
- Time zone: UTC+5:30 (IST)
- PIN: 685604
- Telephone code: 914868
- Vehicle registration: KL-06
- Nearest Railway Station: Ernakulam (Aluva)
- Website: www.facebook.com/Padamugham

Padamugham is a village in Vathikudy grama panchayat in the taluk of Idukki in the Idukki District in the Indian state of Kerala.
