= Painavu =

- Town
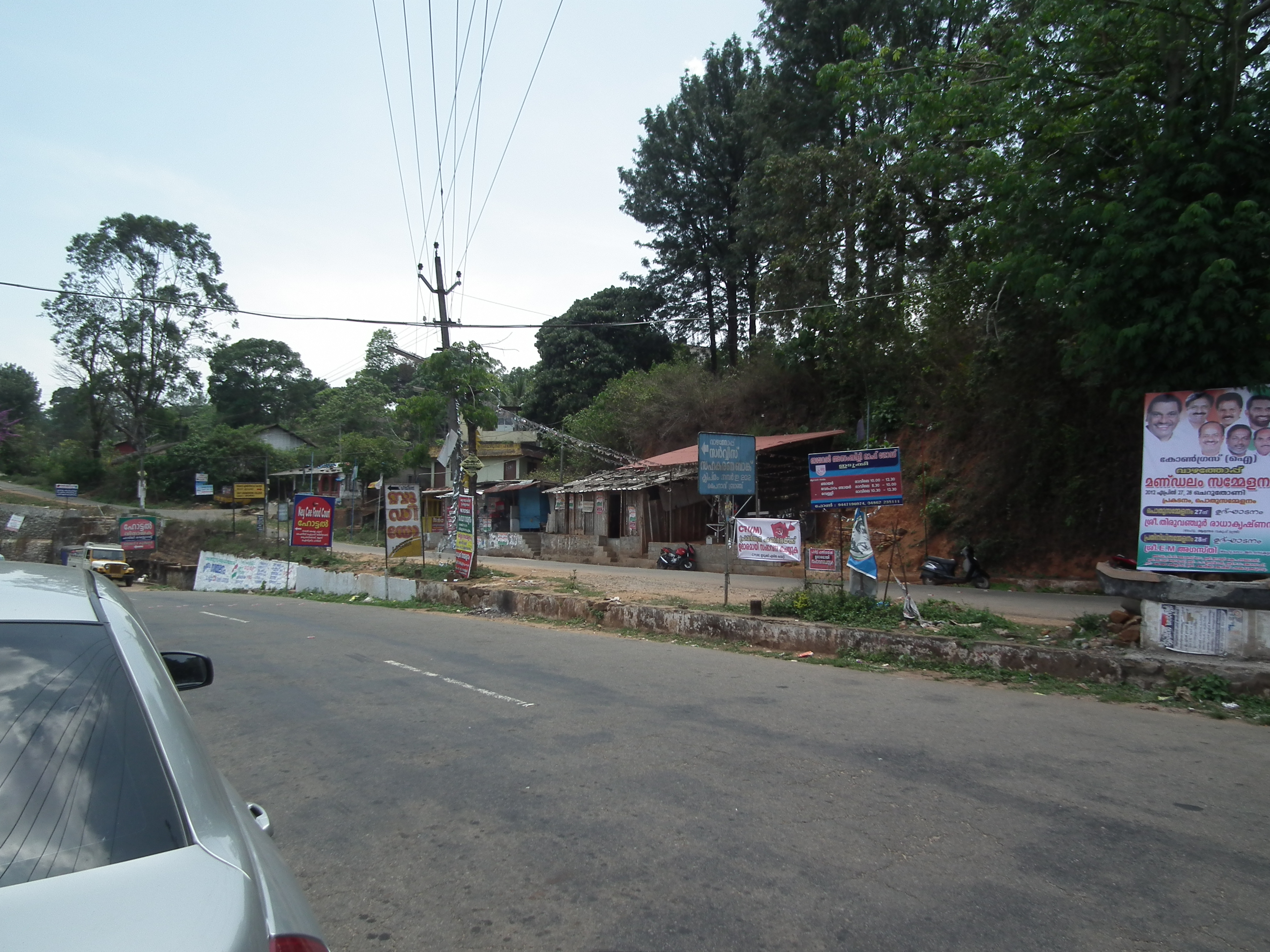
- Painavu junction

- Location in Kerala, India Painavu (India)
- Coordinates: 9°51′13.184″N 76°56′51.528″E
- Country: India
- State: Kerala
- District: Idukki

Population (2011)
  - Total: 14,430

Languages
  - Official: Malayalam, English
- Time zone: UTC+5:30 (IST)
- PIN: 685603
- Vehicle registration: KL-06

Painavu is a small town and the administrative headquarters of Idukki district of Kerala, in southwestern India.

== Transport ==
- Nearest Airport: Cochin International Airport, Nedumbassery - 120 km
- Nearest Railhead: Kottayam - 97 km
- Road connectivity: State Highway 33 km from Thodupuzha and Idukki Road from Neriyamangalam

== Climate ==
- May - October : Rainy 12-25 degrees
- November - January : Mild 5-20 degrees
- February - April: Warm 15-30 degrees

== Places of interest ==
Situated amidst the Idukki Wild Life Sanctuary, Painavu is also home to several State Government institutions such as Civil Station, Idukki and Government Engineering College, Idukki, Ekalavya Model Residential School idukki, District Panchayath idukki, Kendriya Vidyalaya Idukki, Model Polytechnic College Painavu. Idukki Dam and Cheruthoni Dam, part of the Idukki Hydro Electric project, are situated 7 km from Painavu.

View of Painavu

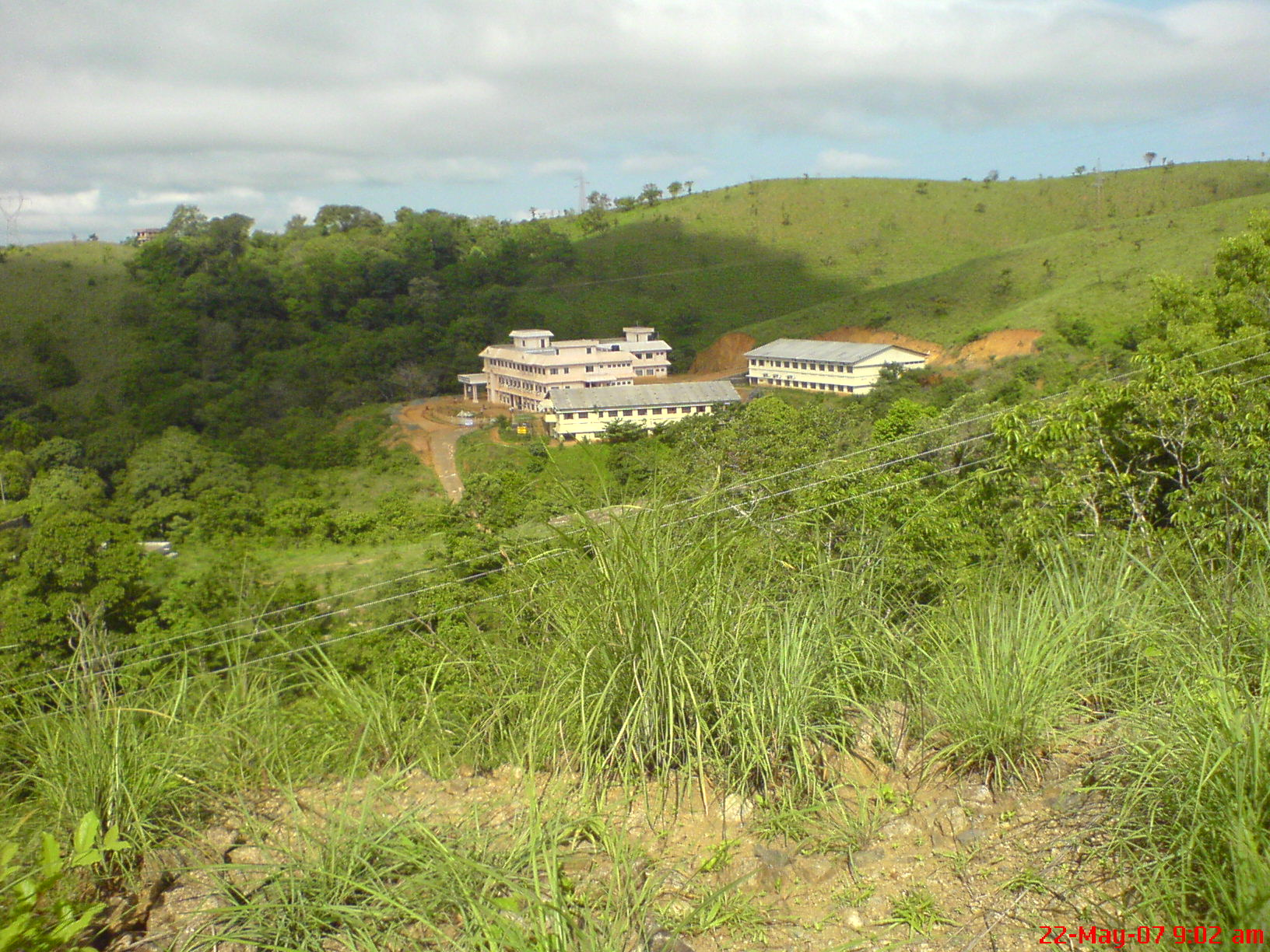
Engineering College, Painavu.
