= Nedumkandam =

- Town
- Location in Kerala, India Nedumkandam (India)
- Coordinates: 9.843°N 77.1519°E
- Country: India
- State: Kerala
- District: Idukki

Government
  - Type: Panchayath
  - Body: Nedumkandam Grama Panchayat

Area
  - Total: 71.95 km^{2} (27.78 sq mi)
- Elevation: 900–1,190 m (2,950–3,900 ft)

Population (2011)
  - Total: 41,980
  - Density: 583.5/km^{2} (1,511/sq mi)

Languages
  - Official: Malayalam, English
- Time zone: UTC+5:30 (IST)
- PIN: 685553
- Telephone code: 04868
- Vehicle registration: KL-69, KL-37
- Nearest cities: Kattappana, Adimaly, Munnar
- Lok Sabha constituency: Idukki
- Niyamasabha constituency: Udumbanchola
- Climate: cold climate which may come down to 10c (Köppen)

Nedumkandam is the headquarters of Udumbanchola taluk which is situated in Idukki district of the Indian state of Kerala. Nedumkandam is among the fastest growing towns in the Idukki district. Nedumkandam is well known for its spices production and is a major contributor to the production of spices like cardamom and pepper. This town situated at an average elevation (considering only town region) of 900 meter above sea level and maximum elevation respectively 1190 meter (kailasappara mountain) 1100 meter (Ummakkkada mountain, Kurishupara) and 975 meter (Nedumkandam St. Sebastian's Church Kurishumala ) and is a destination for economical stay and shopping for tourists in the popular Kumily-Munnar tourist route.

== Geography ==
Geographically, Nedumkandam lies in between the Periyar Tiger reserve/Thekkady and the hill station of Munnar. It is known as the land of migratory farmers, most of whom have migrated from Central Travancore areas like Kottayam, Pala, Thodupuzha, Kothamangalam and Muvattupuzha in search of better agricultural land in the 1960s to 1980s period. The land occupies the modern nedumkandum was either bought by the migrants from the native tribal people who were the traditional inhabitants of the land or was encroached from the then evergreen rain forests of western ghat. Most of these forests have now converted to agricultural lands or gave-way to the modern township. The major agriculture crops produced here are cash-crops like cardamom, pepper and coffee. Besides there are a wide variety of other cash crops like tea, ginger, clove, coco, nutmeg etc. are also cultivated in small scales, in some areas according to geographic conditions available

== Location ==
The town of Nedumkandam is situated along the sides of State Highway 19 (Kerala), State Highway 40 (Kerala) and State Highway 42 (Kerala) almost midway between these three famous tourist destinations in western ghat and it extends a stretch of approx. 3 km. As a town with a history of less than four decades, it is a testimony to the high rate of migration from the low lands of Kerala in that time span where elephants roamed until the early sixties. It has evolved as a major township for the neighboring villages with Hospitals, Educational institutions, Banks and a spate of Government offices littered among the business centers. Pepper and cardamom are the mainstays of the economy. Pepper cultivation is predominantly a Malayalee activity. Land holdings are small, generally ranging from 10 cents to 5 acres (20,000 m^{2}) and a couple of cows for a family are common. In the dawn hours, riders with pails of milk can be seen descending to the town from their boards in the hills around Nedumkandam. The milk, collected by societies and carted off to Kochi, Kottayam etc. has sustained many a family in the lean years after their pepper vines were decimated by the wilt disease.

Cardamom farms are larger and about half of the owners are Tamilians whose parents ascended the ghats from Cumbam, Bodinaikanur areas of Tamil Nadu to cultivate the forest soils of the Cardamom Hill Reserve areas. Nearest Picnic Spots are Ramakkalmedu, Kailasapara, Thooval falls, Kallumekallu, Mankuthimedu, Neyyandimala.
