= National Highway 49 (India, old numbering) =

Old numbering of road in India

National Highway 49
- Map of Old NH49 in red

Route information
- Part of AH43
- Length: 440 km (270 mi)

Major junctions
- From: Kochi, Ernakulam district, Kerala
- To: Mukundarayar Chathiram, Dhanushkodi, Ramanathapuram district, Tamil Nadu

Location
- Country: India
- States: Tamil Nadu: 290 km (180 mi); Kerala: 150 km (93 mi)
- Primary destinations: Kochi - Adimali - Munnar - Theni - Madurai - Paramakudi -Ramanathapuram- Rameswaram - Dhanushkodi

Highway system
- Roads in India; Expressways; National; State; Asian
← NH 48	→ NH 50

National Highway 49 (or NH 49) was a National Highway in southern India under former numbering system.. It traversed coast-to-coast linking Kochi in Kerala with Dhanushkodi in Tamil Nadu. It crosses the famous Pamban Bridge (Annai Indira Gandhi Bridge) before crossing into Rameswaram island. The total length runs up to 440 km (270 mi). The 5 km road between Mukundarayar Chathiram and Dhanuskodi was destroyed during the 1963 cyclone and was rebuilt.

Government of India has recently announced that the destroyed stretch will be rebuilt at a cost of INR 250 million. The road between Madurai and Ramanathapuram is soon to be converted from the present single road to a four-lane highway. Union minister for road transport and shipping Nitin Gadkari participated in the foundation stone-laying ceremony for the Rs 1,387-crore project in Madurai on 17 July 2015. An initial outlay of Rs 900 crore was made and now the project has been sanctioned Rs 1,387 crore. The 75 km stretch from Madurai to Paramakudi will be converted into a four-lane road, while the remaining 39 km stretch from Paramakudi to Ramanathapuram widened to form a two-lane road with paved shoulders. Falling under the NH-49, this project is one of the largest to be implemented in Tamil Nadu by the NHAI in the recent times.

== Route ==
In 2010, old NH 49 was renumbered to form parts of present-day NH 85 and NH 87. The section between Kochi and Tiruppuvanam became part of NH 85, while the portion between Tiruppuvanam and Dhanushkodi was redesignated as NH 87.

Kerala: Kochi Metropolitan Area(Kundannoor, Thripunithura, Thiruvankulam, Puthencruz), Kolenchery, Muvattupuzha, Kothamangalam, Neriamangalam, Adimali, Pallivasal, Munnar, Devikulam and Poopara.

Tamil Nadu:Bodimettu, Bodinayakkanur, Theni, Andipatti, Usilampatti, Madurai, Tiruppuvanam, Manamadurai, Parthibanur, Paramakudi, Ramanathapuram, Mandapam, Pamban, Rameswaram, Mukundarayar Chathiram And Dhanushkodi.

== See also ==
- List of national highways in India
- National Highways Development Project
