= Anayirangal Dam =

Dam in Kerala, India

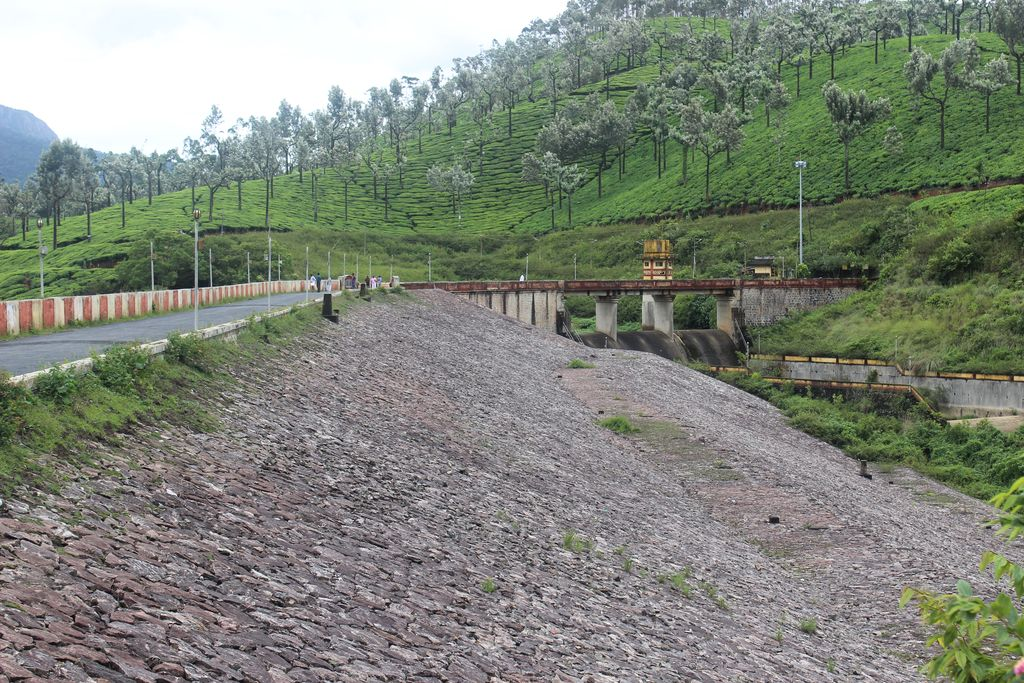

- Location within Kerala Location within India
- Interactive map of Anayirangal Dam
- Official name: Anayirankal Dam
- Country: India
- Location: Idukki, Kerala
- Coordinates: 10°00′34″N 77°12′27″E
- Purpose: Power
- Status: Operational
- Opening date: 1965 (61 years ago)
- Owner: Kerala State Electricity Board

Dam and spillways
- Type of dam: Earth fill dam
- Impounds: Panniyar river
- Height (foundation): 34.13 m (112.0 ft)
- Length: 326.13 m (1,070.0 ft)
- Elevation at crest: 1,207.02 m (3,960.0 ft)
- Spillways: 3 nos, ungated (9.35 × 4.75 m)
- Spillway type: Ogee type
- Spillway capacity: 348 m^{3}/s

Reservoir
- Creates: Anayirankal Reservoir
- Total capacity: 50,680,000 m^{3} (1.790×10^{9} cu ft)
- Catchment area: 64.92 km^{2} (25.07 sq mi)
- Maximum water depth: 1,210.07 m (3,970.0 ft)
- Normal elevation: 1,207.02 m (3,960.0 ft)

Panniar Power Station
- Coordinates: 9°58′23″N 77°01′41″E
- Operator: Kerala State Electricity Board
- Commission date: 1963 (63 years ago)
- Turbines: 2 × 16.2 MW (Francis-type)
- Installed capacity: 32.4 MW
- Annual generation: 158 MU
- Website; Official website

Anayirangal Dam is an earthen dam built on the Panniyar river in Chinnakanal and Santhanpara panchayats, 22 km (14 mi) from Munnar in Idukki district of Kerala, India. The dam is surrounded on one side by forest and on the other by Tata Tea Plantation. The dam is located near the Munnar - Kumily road. The water flowing from the dam reaches Kuthungal and Ponmudi dams through the Panniyar river. Power is generated at Kuthungal and Panniyar powerhouses. The dam stores water from small streams flowing from Bealram and rainwater flowing from the hills on the Tamil Nadu border. The height of the dam is 34.14 metres (112.0 ft) and Length is 326.13 metres (1,070.0 ft). The reservoir usually fills up in June and July.

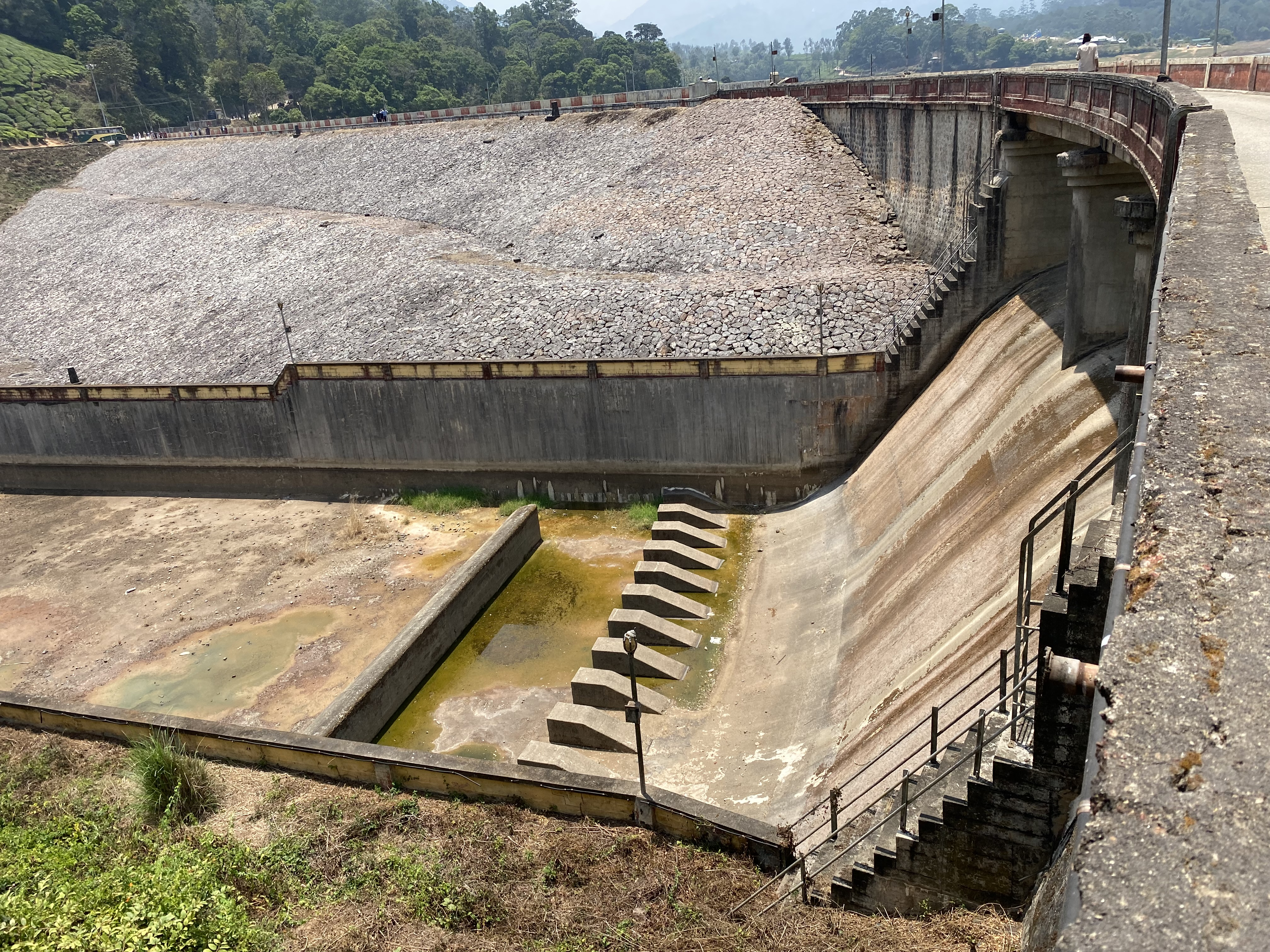
From east

The project is situated in Muthirapuzha basin, a sub basin of Periyar River. The reservoir is created by constructing a dam at Anayirankal. Construction was led by E.U.Philipose, Superintending Engineer, Kerala State Electricity Board. The dam has ungated spill way system. The water stored in the reservoir is released to the river downstream through an outlet. This water is diverted by an overflow barrage at Kuthungal to Kuthungal Power House. After generation of power the water is released to Ponmudi reservoir at the downstream. This water is then diverted to Panniyar Power station located on the left bank of Muthirapuzha and released back to Muthirapuzha River and flows downstream to Kallarkutty reservoir.From there, the river flows through taluks of Udumpanchola, Devikulam, Kothamangalam, Muvattupuzha, Kunnathunadu, Aluva, Kodungalloor, Paravur.

== Specifications ==
- Type of Dam : Earthen dam
- Classification : HH (High Height)
- Panchayath : Santhanpara
- Village : Pooppara, Chinnakanal, Rajakumari
- District : Idukki
- River : Panniyar
- Height from deepest foundation : 34.14 m
- Length : 326.13 m
- Full Reservoir Level ( FRL) : EL 1207.02 m
- Storage at FRL : 50.68 Mm3

== Reservoir ==
Reservoir is formed by impounding the Panniyar river. There is a second reservoir made by Ponmudi dam which is part of the Panniyar project.

- Full Reservoir Level (FRL) = 1207.01 m
- Minimum Drawdown level (MDDL)= 1188.1 m
- Effective Storage at FRL = 49.87 MCM
- Generation potential at FRL = 65.62 MU
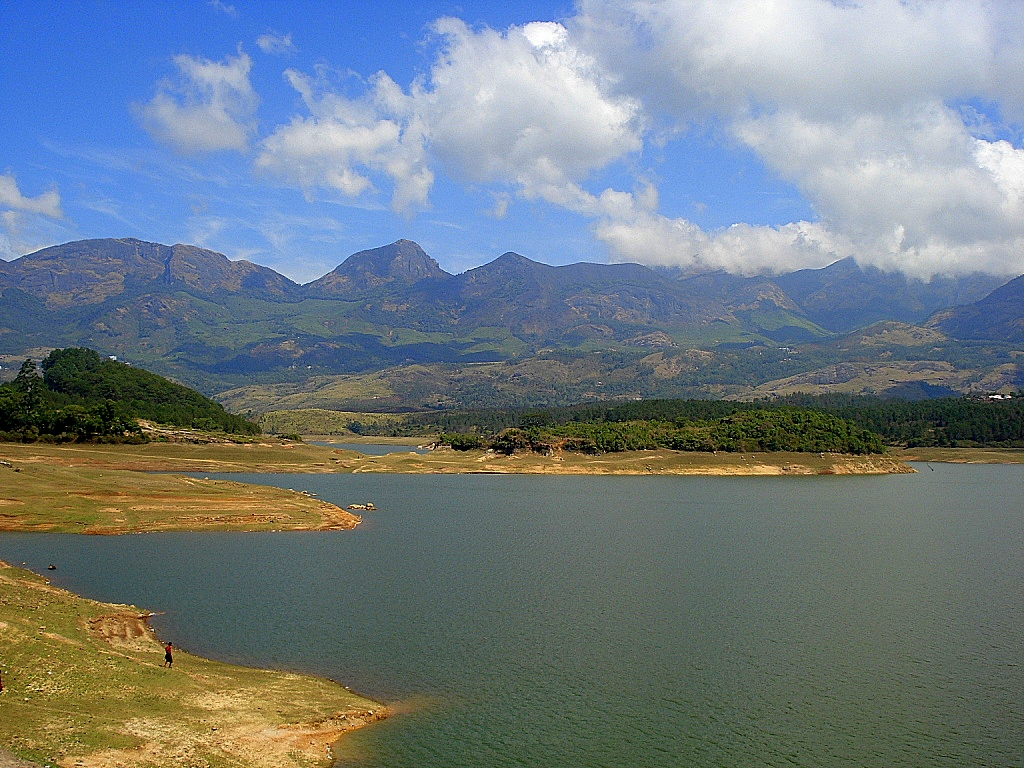
From dam crest

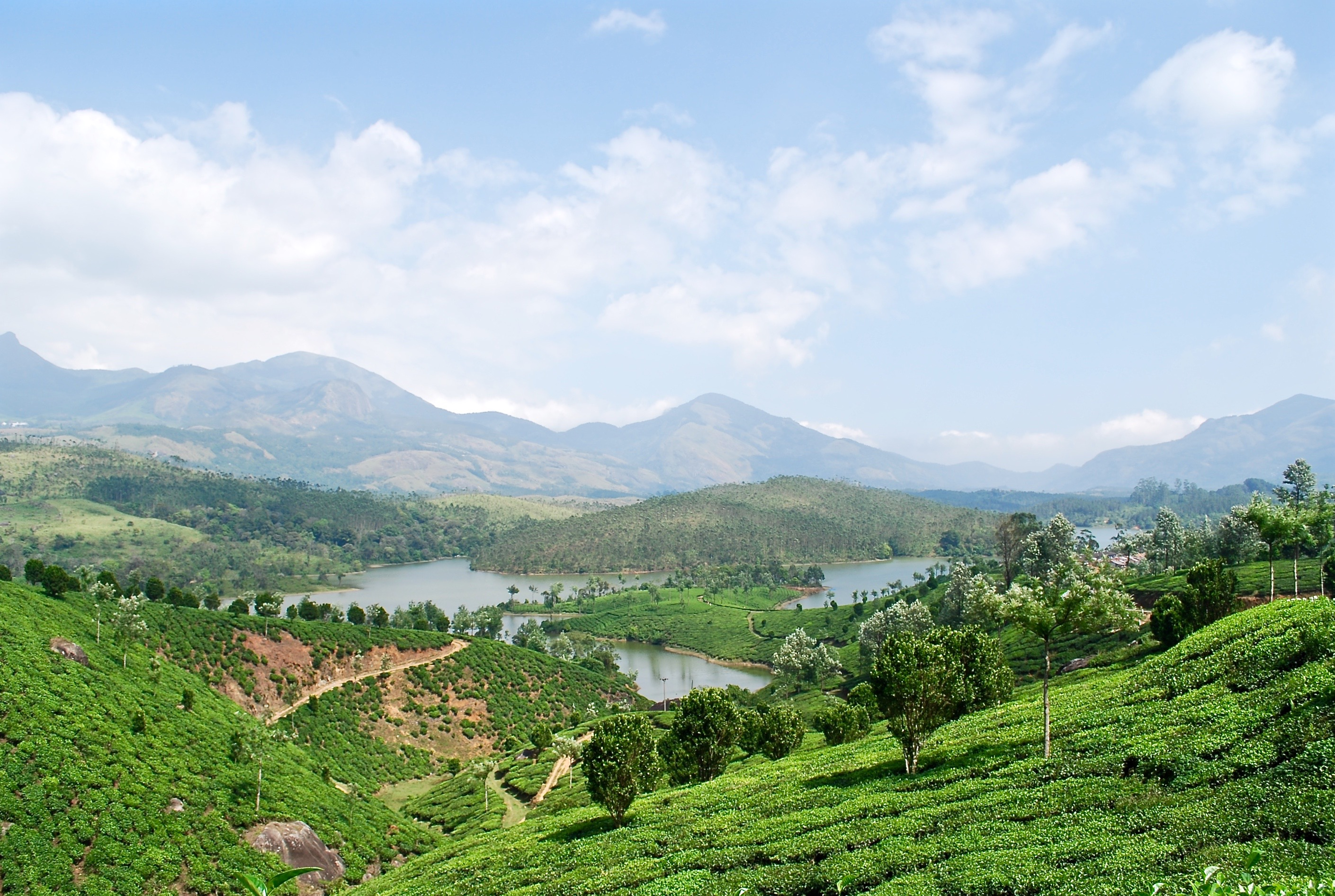
From west

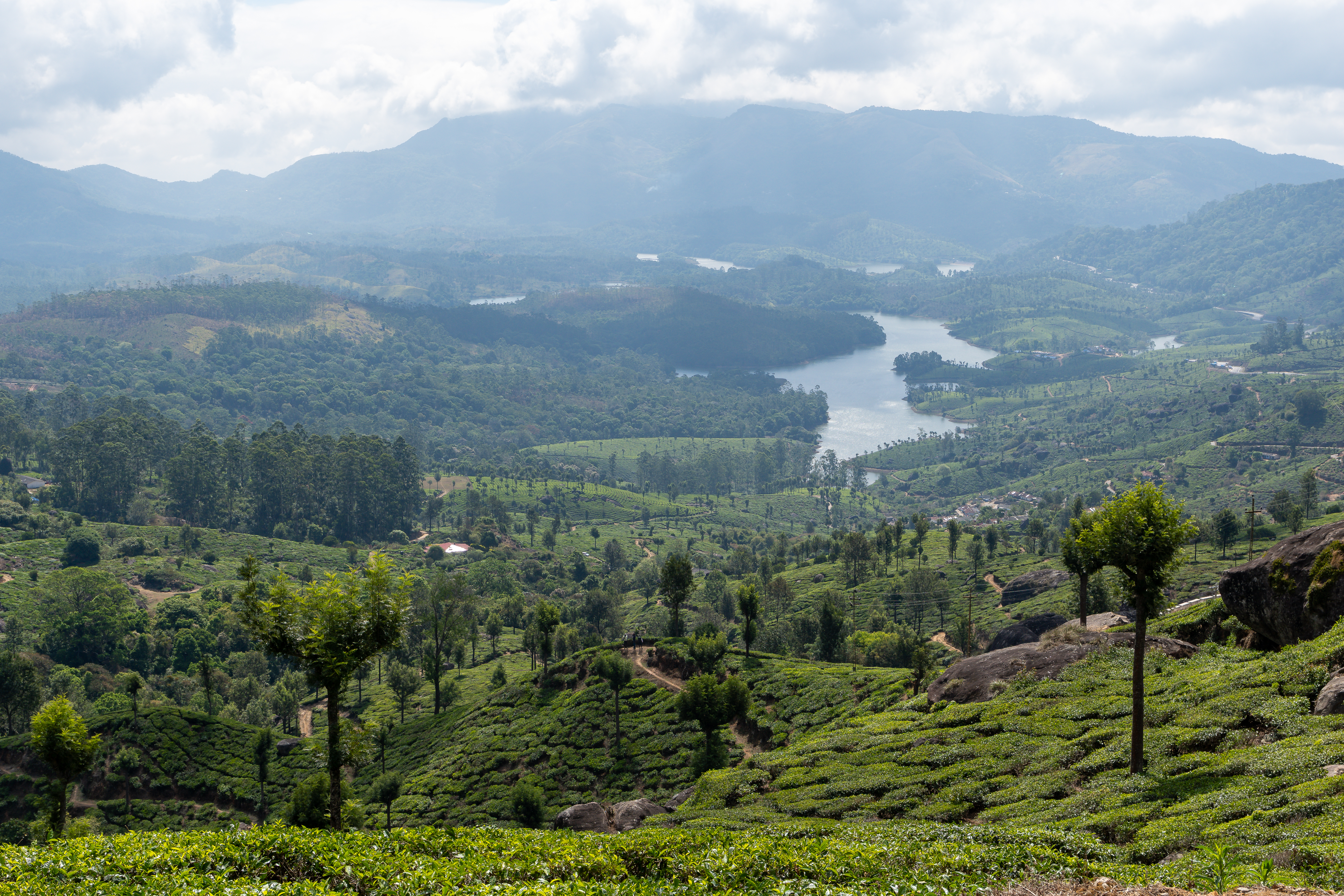
From west

== Power generation ==
Panniyar Power House in Vellathooval village, Konnathadi Grama Panchayat, on the left bank of Muthirapuzha, generates 30 MW of electricity using 2 turbines of 15 MW each. Annual production is 158 MU. In 2003, the project was upgraded from 30 MW to 32.4 MW.
