= Anchuruli Tunnel =

Water tunnel in Kerala, India

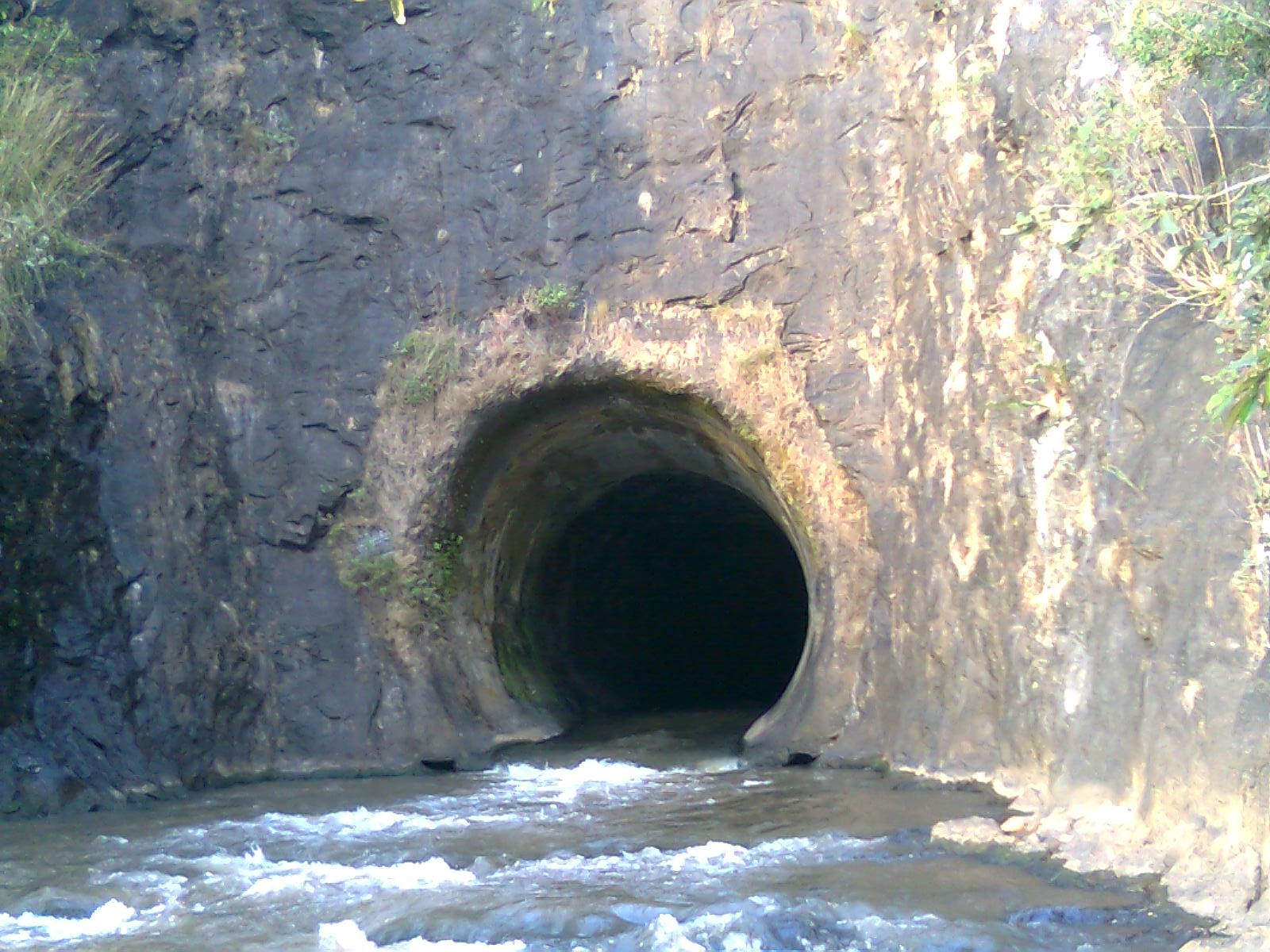
- Tunnel end at Anchuruli (2009 photograph)
- Interactive map of Anchuruli Tunnel

Overview
- Other name: Erattayar Idukki Tunnel
- Location: Idukki, Kerala
- Coordinates: Erattayar end: 9°47′49″N 77°05′53″E; Anchuruli end: 9°46′17″N 77°04′29″E
- Status: Active
- Crosses: Kalyanathandu hill
- Start: Erattayar
- End: Anchuruli

Operation
- Work began: 10 March 1974
- Opened: 10 January 1980
- Owner: Kerala State Electricity Board
- Character: Water tunnel

Technical
- Length: 3.803 km (2.363 mi)
- No. of lanes: 1
- Tunnel clearance: 24 ft (7.3 m)

Anchuruli Tunnel is a 3.8 km (2.4 mi) long water tunnel in Idukki district of Kerala that starts near Erattayar and ends at Anchuruli in Kanchiyar panchayat. This tunnel was constructed by drilling the Kalyanathandu hill to bring water from the Erattayar dam to the Idukki reservoir for power generation.

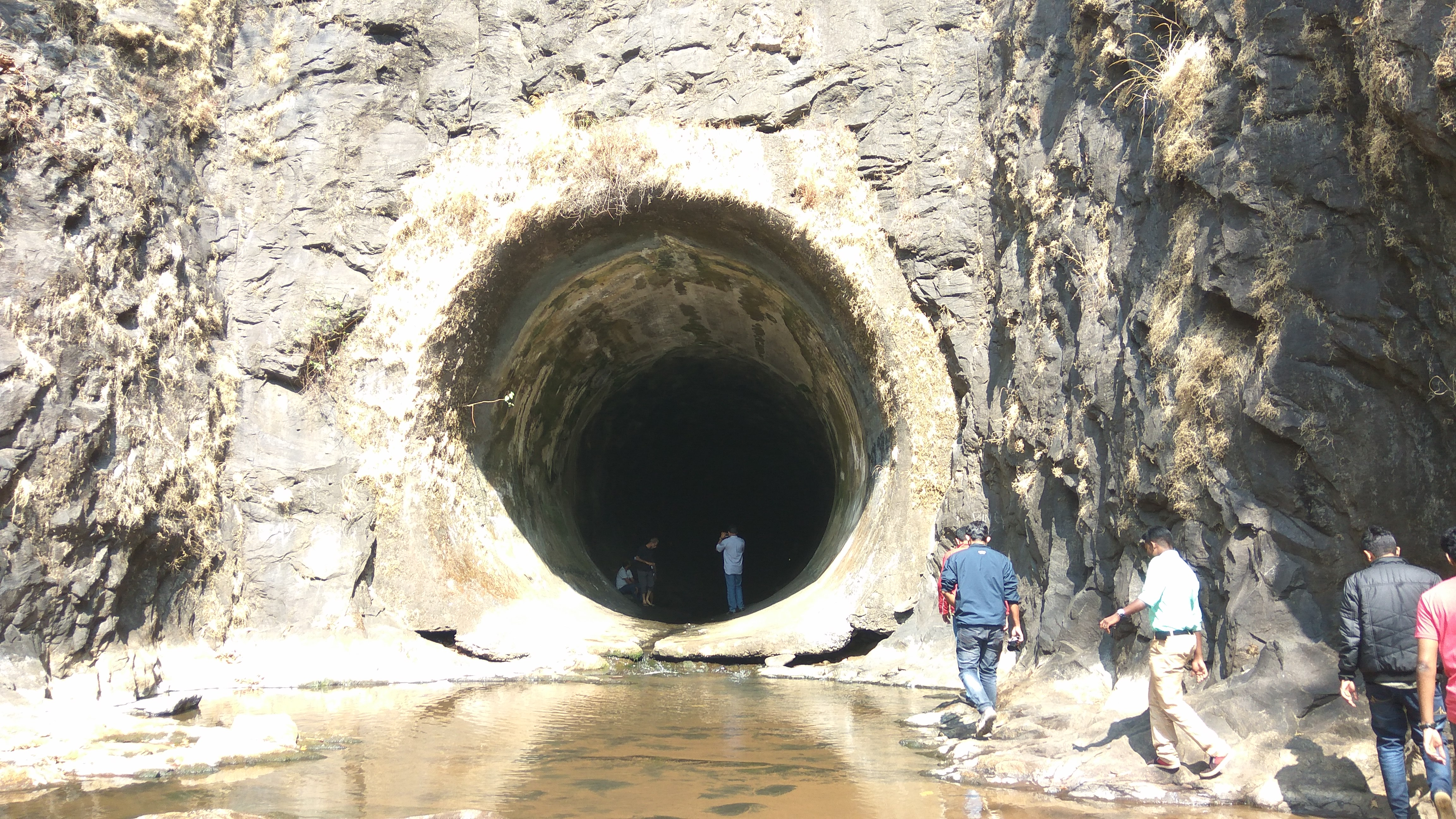
Size comparison with people

The tunnel was constructed from 10 March 1974 to 10 January 1980 on contract by Pyli Pilla. The tunnel has a diameter of 24 ft (7.3 m). 22 people died during the construction of the tunnel.
