= Kozhimala =

Kozhimala Kovilmala
- Tribal settlement/village
- Location in Kerala, India Kozhimala (India)
- Coordinates: 9°43′15″N 77°02′54″E
- Country: India
- State: Kerala
- District: Idukki
- Named for: Mannan tribal community

Government
  - Type: Panchayath
  - Body: Kanchiyar panchayath
- Elevation: 830 m (2,720 ft)

Languages
  - Official: Malayalam, English
- Time zone: UTC+5:30 (IST)
- PIN: 685511
- Area code: 04868
- Vehicle registration: KL-37, KL-69

Kovilmala, locally known as Kozhimala (the hill of hen), is a tribal settlement and a small village near Kattappana in the district of Idukki in Kerala state, India. It is the only existing tribal kingdom in South India which falls under the Kanchiyar grama panchayath of Idukki tehsil (previously Udumbanchola tehsil). The Kingdom consists of namely four divisions such as 'Thekkottu Kattu Rajyam', 'Nadukkuda Kattu Rajyam', 'Athal Orupuram' and 'Chenkanattu Mala'. Goddess Madhura Minakshi of famed Madura Temple in Tamil Nadu is their Kuladevatha (tutelary deity).

== Mannan community of Kovilmala ==
Kovilmala is the headquarters of Mannan community who preserves certain customs, traditions and form of governance, making them a unique tribal unit. The system of governance here is a democratic - monarchy in which a king is elected by the people to rule. The dynastic succession is through the matrilineal system of inheritance by which the properties are inherited by the nephew. The administration of Mannan community inhabited here is held by Raja Mannan (King of Mannans), the title given to the elected king. He holds the responsibility to take care of the other 42 Kudis (settlements) spread over the various parts of Idukki district. Today, these Kudis are located in places like Kumily, Adimaly, Vathikudy, Maniyarankudy, Machiplavu, Korangatti, Kattappana, Murickassery, Thopramkudy, Nedumkandam, Mankulam, Irumpupalam etc. The king has a council of 9 ministers named Kanis (community leaders) who assist him to settle the disputes regarding marriage, divorce, internal and external affairs. Annual meetings are held every year for the leaders who represents various kudis. These Kanis are also responsible to elect a new king after the death of any king. The current king of this community is 'Raman Raja Mannan', an economics graduate from Maharaja's college in Eranakulam, who ascended the throne following the demise of his uncle 'Ariyan Raja Mannan', the 16th king of this tribal dynasty. It is believed that the Mannan community were the warrior tribe of Pandyan lines, fled to the forest interiors of Idukki at time of the prolonged war between Cheras and Cholas in ancient Tamilakam. Today, they hosts an annual festival named 'Kalavoottu' as a tribute to the nature for providing sufficient harvest. An 'Aadivasi Koothu' is also conducted with the Kalavoottu festival which is primarily associated with the Kovalan-Kannagi story, mentioned in the famous Tamil literary work 'Silappatikaram'. It is also organized during the death ceremonies of kings and at times of official annual meetings.

== Noted kings of Kovilmala ==
- Thevan Raja Mannan: He was born in 1948 and became the raja in 1996 according to the matrilineal system of inheritance. He died of a heart attack in 2007 at the age of 54.
- Ariyan Raja Mannan: His real name is 'Rameshan'. He succeeded the former king 'Thevan Raja Mannan' and ascended the throne in 2007. But he died in 2011 at the age of 29 due to illness. The Kerala state government gave all honors to him at the time of his funeral. Ariyan Raja Mannan is widely acknowledged as the youngest king in the Mannan community.
- Raman Raja Mannan: His original name is N. Binu, a native of Kumily Mannankudy. He succeeded Ariyan Raja Mannan on 4 March 2012. He is the only literate king among the Mannan community who received the graduation in economics from Eranakulam Maharaja's College.

== Access to Kovilmala ==
In the past, Accessing Kozhimala was quite difficult due to the absence of quality roads. But the transportation facilities were improved in the recent times as Kozhimala achieved great fame. The easiest route to Kozhimala is by Kattappana - Kanchiyar - Swaraj - Murikkattukudi route (14 km). Private buses operates to Kozhimala from Kattappana at regular intervals. Taxis are also available from the main junction at Swaraj.

=== Airports ===
The nearest airport to Kozhimala is Cochin international airport (118 km). Thiruvananthapuram international airport is at a distance of 205 km.

=== Railways ===
Kaduthuruthy is the nearest railhead which is at a distance of 92 km. Kottayam (103 km), Changanassery (104 km) and Thiruvalla (110 km) are the other nearby railheads.

== See also ==
- Mannan language
- Mannan people
- Kannambadi
