= M. M. Mani =

Indian politician (born 1946)

- എം. എം. മണി
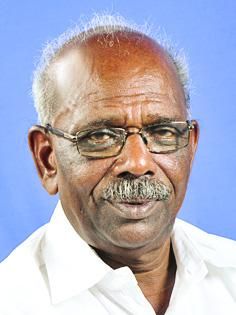

Minister for Electricity, Government of Kerala
- In office 22 November 2016 – 3 May 2021
- Chief Minister: Pinarayi Vijayan
- Preceded by: Kadakampally Surendran
- Succeeded by: K. Krishnankutty

Member of the Kerala Legislative Assembly
- In office 2 June 2016 – 23 May 2026
- Preceded by: K. K. Jayachandran
- Succeeded by: Senapathy Venu
- Constituency: Udumbanchola

Personal details
- Born: 12 December 1946 (age 79) Kidangoor, Kottayam, Kingdom of Travancore, British India (present day Kottayam, Kerala, India)
- Party: Communist Party of India (Marxist)
- Parents: Madhavan; Janaki
- Occupation: Politician

Mundakkakkal Madhavan Mani (born 12 December 1946) is an Indian politician and Communist Party of India (Marxist) leader. ^{[1]} He was elected as the MLA from Udumbanchola constituency. He was the former District Secretary of Communist Party of India (Marxist).

He contested from Udumbanchola constituency in 1996 but failed. He became the Idukki district secretary of CPI(M) in 1985 for the first time and was elected eight times consecutively to the post. He was elected from Udumbanchola constituency to Kerala assembly in May 2016.

In 2021 Kerala legislative elections he was re-elected from the same constituency by defeating the congress candidate E. M. Augusty of the Congress by a margin of 38,305 votes.

== Controversies ==
On 14 July 2022, Mani made a controversial remark against opposition MLA K. K. Rema, saying that "A woman became a widow. That is her fate. We are not responsible for that". This remark drew flak from the opposition, who demanded his apology. The Speaker of the Assembly said that the comments would be inspected.

== Biography ==
Mani was born in Kidangoor to Madhavan and Janaki, the eldest of their seven children. His family migrated to Idukki from Kidangoor when he was a child. He went to St. Mary's School in Kidangoor. He joined Communist Party of India (Marxist) at the age of 21 in 1966. His works are mainly focused on trade union works among the plantation labourers in Idukki.

== Political career ==
Mani served as the Idukki district party Secretary from 1985. LDF government in Kerala led by Pinarayi Vijayan inducted CPI(M) secretariat member M M Mani into the cabinet on 22 November 2016. He served as electricity minister under Pinarayi Vijayan government. This was after former electricity minister E. P. Jayarajan resigned after allegations of nepotism. Mani landed into controversy due to his way of talking during speeches.

In a speech at Manakkad on 25 May 2012, Mani, who was then the CPI(M) Idukki district secretary, said that he and the party had made a list of their political rivals and killed them. After the police arrested him, CPI(M) declared a hartal in Idukki district.

On 23 November 2016 he said that former Union Minister O. Rajagopal is out of his mind due to his old age. He also said that Rajagopal was elected as an MLA because of people's foolishness. This was after Rajagopal supported demonetization, which was initiated by the prime minister, Narendra Modi.

Mani has made several other controversial statements since he became a minister. In February 2016, he insulted police officers in Idukki and a female principal of a local college. He called the local Sub-Inspector of Police, a bastard. He also accused the principal of the college of conducting immoral activities in her office room.

On 6 April 2017, Mani made a statement about the Prime Minister of India, Narendra Modi. He said that Modi left his wife as he was suffering from some kind of "biological problem". He also said that Modi treated his mother badly, as he made her wait at the ATM for two hours to withdraw money, after there was a shortage of cash following demonetization. He made this statement while he was campaigning for LDF at Kondotty for the Malappuram by-election.

On 22 April 2017, he accused Sub-collector Sriram Venkitaraman of having mental illness which should be treated at a mental health facility. This was after Venkitaraman took down a cross which was in an encroached area. He has accused Venkitaraman of having RSS ties as well. Later on, he made a statement about Pombilai Orumai, which was controversial. He accused them of having illicit affairs with several men while they held a protest a few years back. Following this, Pombilai Orumai has been conducting a protest. They want Mani to either apologize to them directly or resign from his position. Several CPI(M) members and opposition leaders have expressed concerns about Mani's statements as well. Mani expressed regret but has not apologized to Pombilai Orumai. Furthermore, he has accused some organizations of assisting Pombilai Orumai in starting the protest. BJP declared a hartal demanding Mani's resignation.

On 25 April 2017, chief minister, Pinarayi Vijayan defended Mani saying Mani's remarks regarding women were distorted and magnified by the media. Vijayan also said that Mani's Idukki dialect and colloquial use of Malayalam also contributed to people misinterpreting his words. Mani said that he did not use the word "woman" in any part of his 17-minute speech and that specific parts of his speech were edited by the media to mislead people.

Mani was the Kerala Minister of Electricity and his ministry is being alleged by opposition leaders and senior administrators as the main reason for one of the largest floods in the state which claimed 400 lives and displaced more than 15 lakh people. Poor management of dams and its operations led to the preventable, and man-made flood. Following the uprising against Mani & the ministry led by him, a number of PIL's were filed against the Government. The Kerala High Court constituted an amicus curiae to investigate the matter and submit a report.

Kerala Legislative Assembly Election
Year	Constituency	Closest Rival	Majority (Votes)	Won/Lost
1996	Udumbanchola	Adv. E. M. Augusthy (INC)	4667	Lost
2016	Udumbanchola	Adv. Senapathy Venu (INC)	1109	Won
2021	Udumbanchola	Adv. E. M. Augusthy (INC)	38305	Won

== See also ==
2016 Kerala Legislative Assembly election
