= Idinjamala =

Hamlet in Kerala, India

- Hamlet
- Interactive map of Idinjamala
- Location in Kerala, India Idinjamala (India)
- Coordinates: 9°49′17″N 77°4′31″E
- Country: India
- State: Kerala
- District: Idukki
- Taluk: Udumbanchola

Government
  - Type: Panchayat
  - Body: Erattayar Grama Panchayat

Languages
  - Official: Malayalam, English
- Time zone: UTC+5:30 (IST)
- PIN: 685514
- Area code: 04868
- Vehicle registration: KL-06, KL-69,

Idinjamala or Edinjamala is a village situated in Udumbanchola taluk of Idukki district in Kerala state, India. It is an electoral ward of Erattayar panchayat in Kattappana block. Idinjamala is home to the International Sustainable Academy (ISA), a sustainability initiative run by the MASS Fairtrade farmer's co-operative.

== Landscape ==
Idinjamala is situated 1,200 m (3,900 ft) above sea level and rich with natural vegetation. Farming is the main occupation here. The soil is alluvial soil, suitable for plantation crops like tea, coffee, cardamom, pepper and other spices which are cultivated in plenty.

== Educational institutions ==
- Government lower primary school, Idinjamala

== Places of worship ==
- Adayalakkallu Devi Temple
- St. Thomas Malankara Catholic Church

== Transportation ==
The nearest railway station is at Kottayam which is 121 km (75 mi) away. Nearest airport is Cochin International Airport which is 110 km (68 mi) away.
