= Erattayar =

Village in Kerala, India

- Village
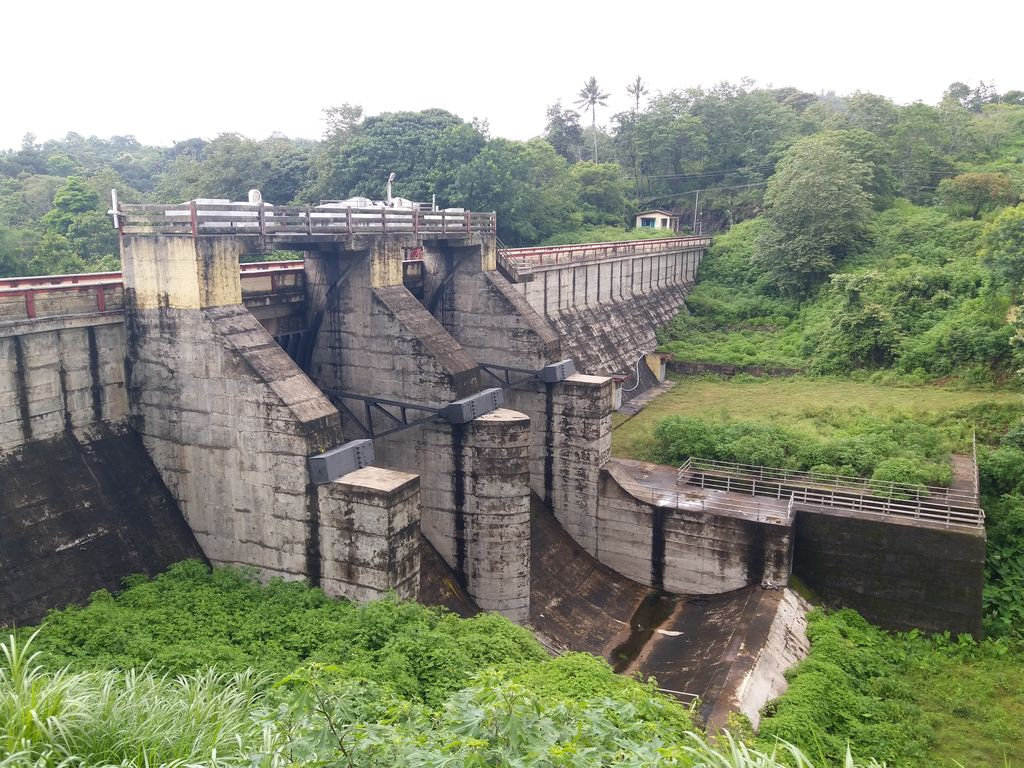
- A diversion dam near Erattayar for supplying water to Idukki reservoir
- Interactive map of Erattayar
- Location in Kerala, India Erattayar (India)
- Coordinates: 9°47′51″N 77°6′18″E
- Country: India
- State: Kerala
- District: Idukki
- Taluk: Udumbanchola

Government
  - Type: Panchayat
  - Body: Erattayar Grama Panchayat
  - Panchayat president: Jinson Varkey
  - Vice president: Bincy Johny

Area
  - Total: 32.37 km^{2} (12.50 sq mi)

Population (2011)
  - Total: 19,097
  - Density: 590.0/km^{2} (1,528/sq mi)

Languages
  - Official: Malayalam, English
- Time zone: UTC+5:30 (IST)
- PIN: 685514
- Area code: 04868
- Vehicle registration: KL-69, KL-06
- Nearest towns: Kattappana, Nedumkandam
- Assembly constituency: Udumbanchola
- Website: www.lsgkerala.in/erattayarpanchayat

Erattayar is a village in Udumbanchola taluk of Idukki district in the Indian state of Kerala. It is the administrative centre of Erattayar panchayat which belongs to Kattappana block panchayat.

== Location ==
Erattayar town is located 2 km (1.2 mi) south to Erattayar dam, a diversion dam built to supply water to Idukki reservoir. Kattappana (5.5 km (3.4 mi)), Kumily (32 km (20 mi)), Nedumkandam (13 km (8.1 mi)), Thakamani (11 km (6.8 mi)), and Valiyathovala (2.5 km (1.6 mi)) are some of the nearby towns.

== Demographics ==
As of 2011 India census, Erattayar had a population of 19,097 with 9,607 males and 9,490 females. Erattayar village has an area of 32.37 km^{2} (12.50 sq mi) with 4,539 families residing in it.

== Erattayar panchayat ==
Erattayar grama panchayat was formed in 1971. The panchayat consists of 14 electoral wards. It is bounded by Pampadumpara panchayat in the east, Kamakshi panchayat in the west, Kattappana municipality in the south and Nedumkandam panchayat in the north.

Ward details of Erattayar panchayat

Ward Number	Ward Name
1	Chempakapara
2	Eattithoppu
3	Pallickanam
4	Erattayar North
5	Ezhukumvayal
6	Kattadikkavala
7	Erattayar
8	Santhigram South
9	Uppukandam
10	Thulasippara
11	Vazhavara
12	Nalumukku
13	Santhigram
14	Idinjamala

== Educational institutions ==
- St. Thomas Higher Secondary School
- St. Thomas Upper and Lower Primary Schools
- St. Thomas Nursery School

== Public transport facilities ==
Erattayar is well-connected to nearby towns and villages through public transport facilities. Frequent private bus services are available to towns like Kattappana, Nedumkandam, Thankamani, Cheruthoni. State-owned KSRTC buses are also available to different places. There is a small bus station in the town which is mostly visited and used by local people.

== See also ==
- Erattayar Dam
