= Mannan (caste) =

Community of Kerala, South India

The Mannan are a community in Kerala, India. They are one of the Adivasi who live in Idukki District. Mannan is a schedule caste community, which only worked as labours in the fields. It is the only existing tribal village in South India which falls under the Kanchiyar grama panchayath of Idukki tehsil (previously Udumbanchola tehsil). The village has four religious divisions such as 'Thekkottu Kattu Rajyam', 'Nadukkuda Kattu Rajyam', 'Athal Orupuram' and 'Chenkanattu Mala'. Goddess Madhura Minakshi of famed Madura Temple in Tamil Nadu is their Kuladevatha (tutelary deity).

== See also ==
- Kozhimala the Mannan settlement that is the community's "headquarters"
- The Scheduled Tribes and Other Traditional Forest Dwellers (Recognition of Forest Rights) Act, 2006

https://sites.google.com/view/focusonpeople/major-tribes-in-kerala
