= Bodimettu =

Bodi Mettu
- Hill Station
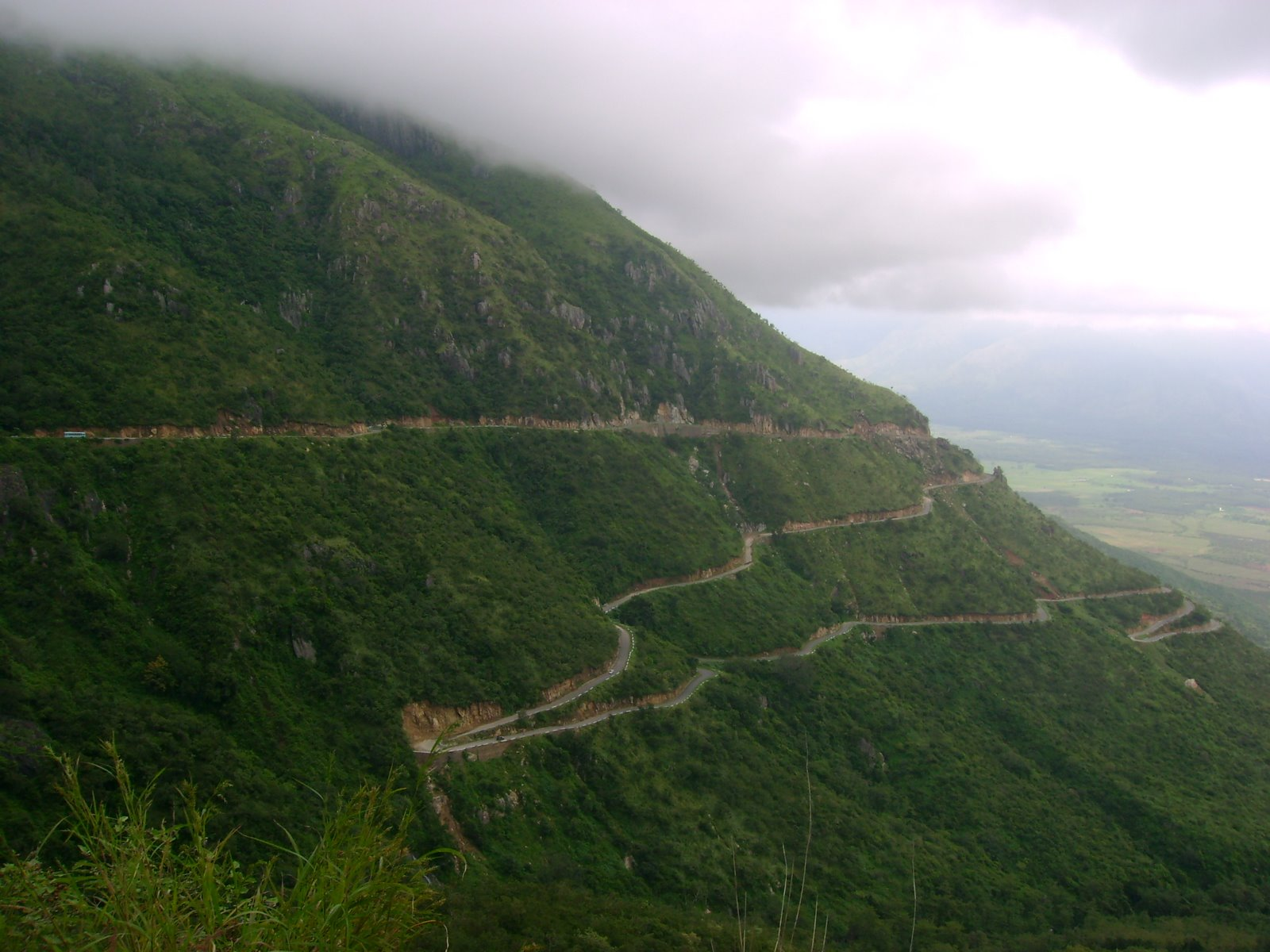

- Location in Tamil Nadu, India Bodi Mettu (Kerala) Bodi Mettu (India)
- Coordinates: 10.020°N 77.264°E
- Country: India
- State: Tamil Nadu
- District: Theni
- Talukas: Bodinayakanur
- Elevation: 1,500 m (4,900 ft)

Population (2011)
  - Total: 733

Languages
  - Official: Tamil
- Time zone: UTC+5:30 (IST)
- PIN: 625582
- Telephone code: 04546xxx
- Vehicle registration: TN 60 Z
- Largest city: Theni
- Nearest city: Bodinayakanur; Munnar
- Literacy: 71%
- Lok Sabha constituency: Bodinayakanur

Bodimettu is a locality in Theni district in the state of Tamil Nadu in India, near the border with Kerala. It is 10 km from Poopara on the way to Bodinayakkanur by the side of National Highway 85, which runs from Dhanushkodi to Kochi. Bodimettu is the main cardamom-growing area of Tamil Nadu. It is close to famous tourist destinations such as Munnar, Marayur, Thekkady, Kodaikanal, Anayirangal Dam.

== Demographics ==
As of 2011 India census, Bodimettu hill had a population of 733. Males constitute 390 of the population and females 343. Bodimettu hill has an average literacy rate of 71%, higher than the national average of 59.5%: male literacy is 40%, and female literacy is 30%. In bodimettu, 57 of the population is under 6 years of age.
