= Udumbanchola Assembly constituency =

Constituency of the Kerala Legislative Assembly

Udumbanchola
- Constituency No. 89 for the Kerala Legislative Assembly
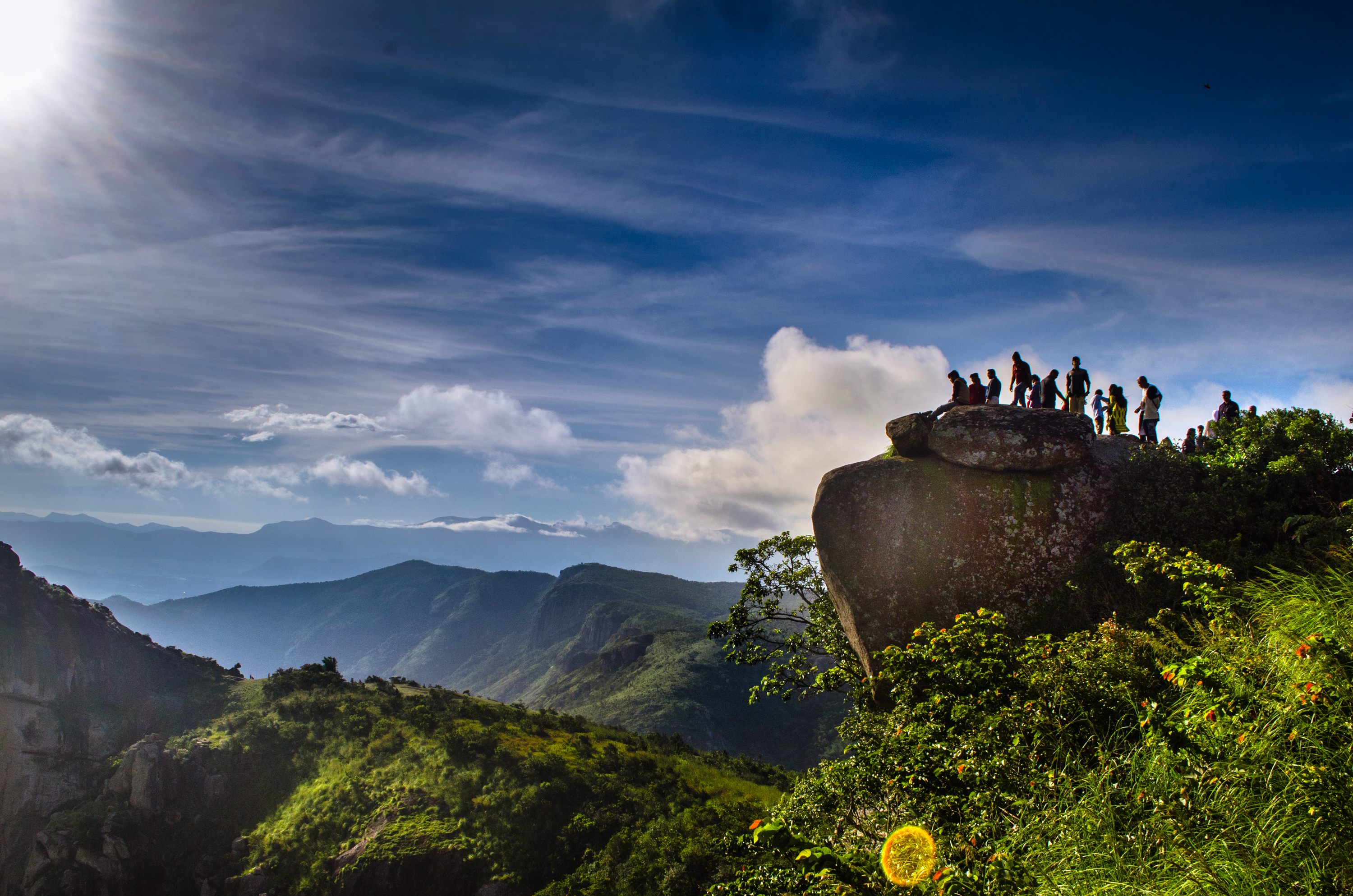
- Ramakkalmedu viewpoint near Karunapuram

Constituency details
- Country: India
- Region: South India
- State: Kerala
- District: Idukki
- Established: 1965
- Total electors: 1,66,760 (2016)
- Reservation: None

Member of Legislative Assembly
- 16th Kerala Legislative Assembly
- Incumbent Senapathy Venu
- Party: INC
- Elected year: 2026

Udumbanchola State assembly constituency is one of the 140 state legislative assembly constituencies in Kerala in southern India. It is also one of the seven state legislative assembly constituencies included in Idukki Lok Sabha constituency. As of the 2026 Assembly elections, the current MLA is Senapathy Venu of INC.

== Local self-governed segments ==
Udumbanchola Assembly constituency is composed of the following local self-governed segments:

Sl no.	Name	Status (Grama panchayat/Municipality)	Taluk
1	Erattayar	Grama panchayat	Udumbanchola
2	Karunapuram	Grama panchayat	Udumbanchola
3	Nedumkandam	Grama panchayat	Udumbanchola
4	Pampadumpara	Grama panchayat	Udumbanchola
5	Rajakkad	Grama panchayat	Udumbanchola
6	Rajakumari	Grama panchayat	Udumbanchola
7	Santhanpara	Grama panchayat	Udumbanchola
8	Senapathy	Grama panchayat	Udumbanchola
9	Udumbanchola	Grama panchayat	Udumbanchola
10	Vandanmedu	Grama panchayat	Udumbanchola

== Members of Legislative Assembly ==
The following list contains all members of Kerala Legislative Assembly who have represented the constituency:

Election	Niyama Sabha	Name	Party	Tenure
1965		K. T. Jacob	Communist Party of India	
1967	3rd	K. T. Jacob	Communist Party of India	1967 – 1970
1970	4th	Sebastian Thomas	Kerala Congress	1970 – 1977
1977	5th	Thomas Joseph	Kerala Congress	1977 – 1980
1980	6th	Thomas Joseph	Kerala Congress	1980 – 1982
1982	7th	M. Jinadevan	Communist Party of India	1982 – 1987
1987	8th	Mathew Stephen	Independent	1987 – 1991
1991	9th	E. M. Augusty	Indian National Congress	1991 – 1996
1996	10th	E. M. Augusty	Indian National Congress	1996 – 2001
2001	11th	K. K. Jayachandran	Communist Party of India	2001 – 2006
2006	12th	K. K. Jayachandran	Communist Party of India	2006 – 2011
2011	13th	K. K. Jayachandran	Communist Party of India	2011 – 2016
2016	14th	M. M. Mani	Communist Party of India	2016 - 2021
2021	15th	M. M. Mani	Communist Party of India	2021-2026
2026	16th	Senapathy Venu	Indian National Congress	Incumbent

== Election results ==
Percentage change (±%) denotes the change in the number of votes from the immediate previous election.

=== 2026 ===
2026 Kerala Legislative Assembly election: Udumbanchola
Party	Candidate	Votes	%	±%
INC	Senapathy Venu	64,916	53.49	
CPI(M)	K. K. Jayachandran	44,895	36.99	
BDJS	Adv. Sangeetha Vishwanathan	10,157	8.37	
BSP	P K Sajeevan	702	0.58	
NOTA	None of the above	686	0.57	
Margin of victory		20,021		
Turnout		121356		
INC gain from CPI(M)		Swing		

=== 2021 ===
There were 1,67,459 registered voters in the constituency for the 2021 Kerala Assembly election.

2021 Kerala Legislative Assembly election: Udumbanchola
Party	Candidate	Votes	%	±%
CPI(M)	M. M. Mani	77,381	61.80	▲21.48
INC	E. M. Augusthy	39,076	31.21	▼8.23
BDJS	Santhosh Madhavan	7,208	5.76	▼11.54
BSP	A. C. Biju	867	0.69	−
NOTA	None of the above	687	0.55	−
Margin of victory		38,305	0.88	▼8.01
Turnout		1,26,018	75.56	▲3.56
CPI(M) hold		Swing	▲21.48	

=== 2016 ===
There were 1,66,770 registered voters in the constituency for the 2016 Kerala Assembly election.

2016 Kerala Legislative Assembly election: Udumbanchola
Party	Candidate	Votes	%	±%
CPI(M)	M. M. Mani	50,813	40.32	▼11.16
INC	Senapathy Venu	49,704	39.44	▼3.15
BDJS	Saji Parambath	21,799	17.30	−
AIADMK	B. Soman	1,651	1.31	−
SDPI	Shanavas Baker	831	0.66	▼0.54
NOTA	None of the above	602	0.48	−
BSP	Raju Manjakkunel	486	0.39	▼0.26
Independent	M. J. Fransis	132	0.10	−
Margin of victory		1,109	0.88	▼8.01
Turnout		1,26,018	75.56	▲3.56
CPI(M) hold		Swing	▼11.16	

=== 2011 ===
There were 1,53,563 registered voters in the constituency for the 2011 election.

2011 Kerala Legislative Assembly election: Udumbanchola
Party	Candidate	Votes	%	±%
CPI(M)	K. K. Jayachandran	56,923	51.48	
INC	Jossy Sebastian	47,090	42.59	
BJP	Narayana Raju	3,836	3.47	
SDPI	Muhammed Sharafudeen	1,331	1.20	
BSP	Benny Thomas	714	0.65	−
Independent	K. C. Mammachan	669	0.61	−
Margin of victory		9,833	8.89	
Turnout		1,10,563	72.00	
CPI(M) hold		Swing		

== See also ==
- Udumbanchola
- Idukki district
- List of constituencies of the Kerala Legislative Assembly
- 2016 Kerala Legislative Assembly election
