= Erattayar Dam =

Diversion dam in Kerala, India

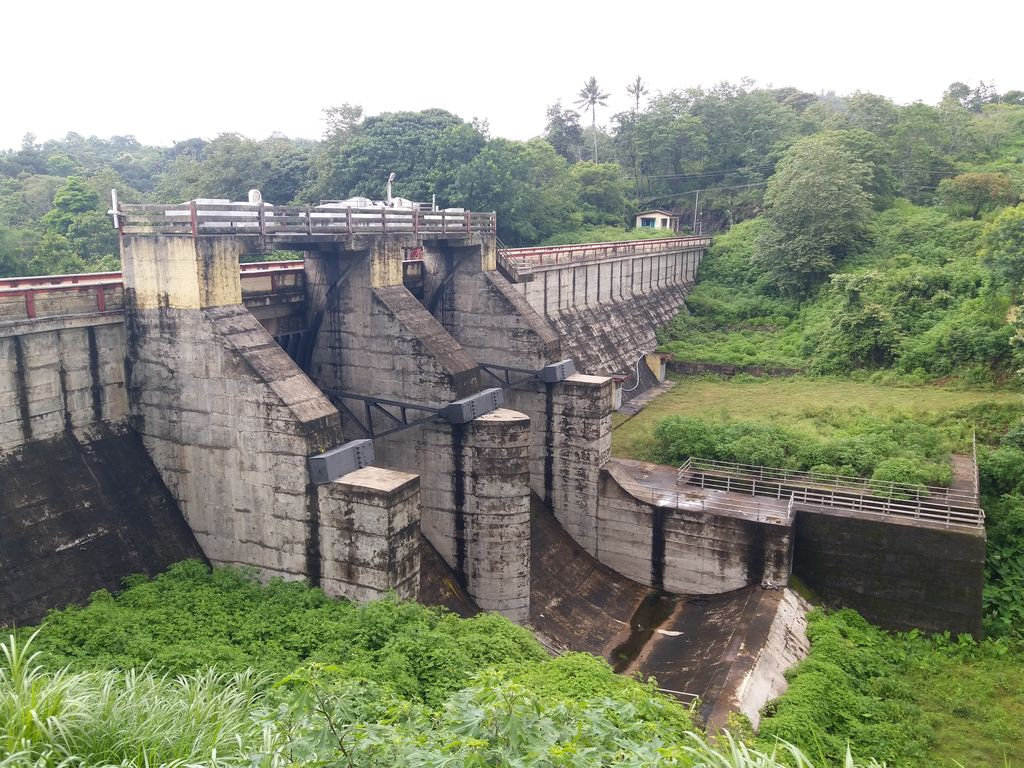
- Erattayar Dam

- Location within Kerala
- Interactive map of Erattayar Dam
- Country: India
- Location: Erattayar
- Coordinates: 9°48′37″N 77°06′22″E
- Purpose: Power
- Status: Operational
- Opening date: 1975
- Owner: Kerala State Electricity Board

Dam and spillways
- Type of dam: Gravity dam
- Impounds: Perinjamkutty river
- Height (foundation): 19.81 m (65.0 ft)
- Length: 146.3 m (480 ft)
- Spillways: 2
- Spillway type: Ogee type – 2 Nos. Radial gates, each of size 7.62 x 6.10 m
- Website

Erattayar Dam (Malayalam: ഇരട്ടയാർ അണക്കെട്ട്) is a small, diversion dam built on the Erattayar river in Erattayar grama panchayat near Kattappana town in Idukki district of Kerala, India. It acts mainly as a diversion dam to supply water to the Idukki dam. Diversion of water from Erattayar forebay to Idukki reservoir is through a tunnel called Anchuruli tunnel which is 3.77 km (2.34 mi) long. Construction of the dam was completed in the year 1989.

It is a small dam measuring only 46.3 m in length and 19.81 m in height. Idukki HE Project- Stage III- Kallar-Erattayar diversion scheme envisages creation of two forebays by means of diversion dams, one in river Kallar of storage capacity 28 Mcft.( 0.793 MCM) and another in river Erattayar of storage capacity 189 Mcft (5.352 MCM) in the upper reaches of river Perinjamkutty a tributary of Periyar. Water from Kallar is diverted to Erattayar through a tunnel 2735.58 m long. Taluk through which release flows are Thodupuzha, Udumpanchola, Devikulam, Kothamangalam, Muvattupuzha, Kunnathunadu, Aluva, Kodungalloor and Paravur.

== Details of the dam ==
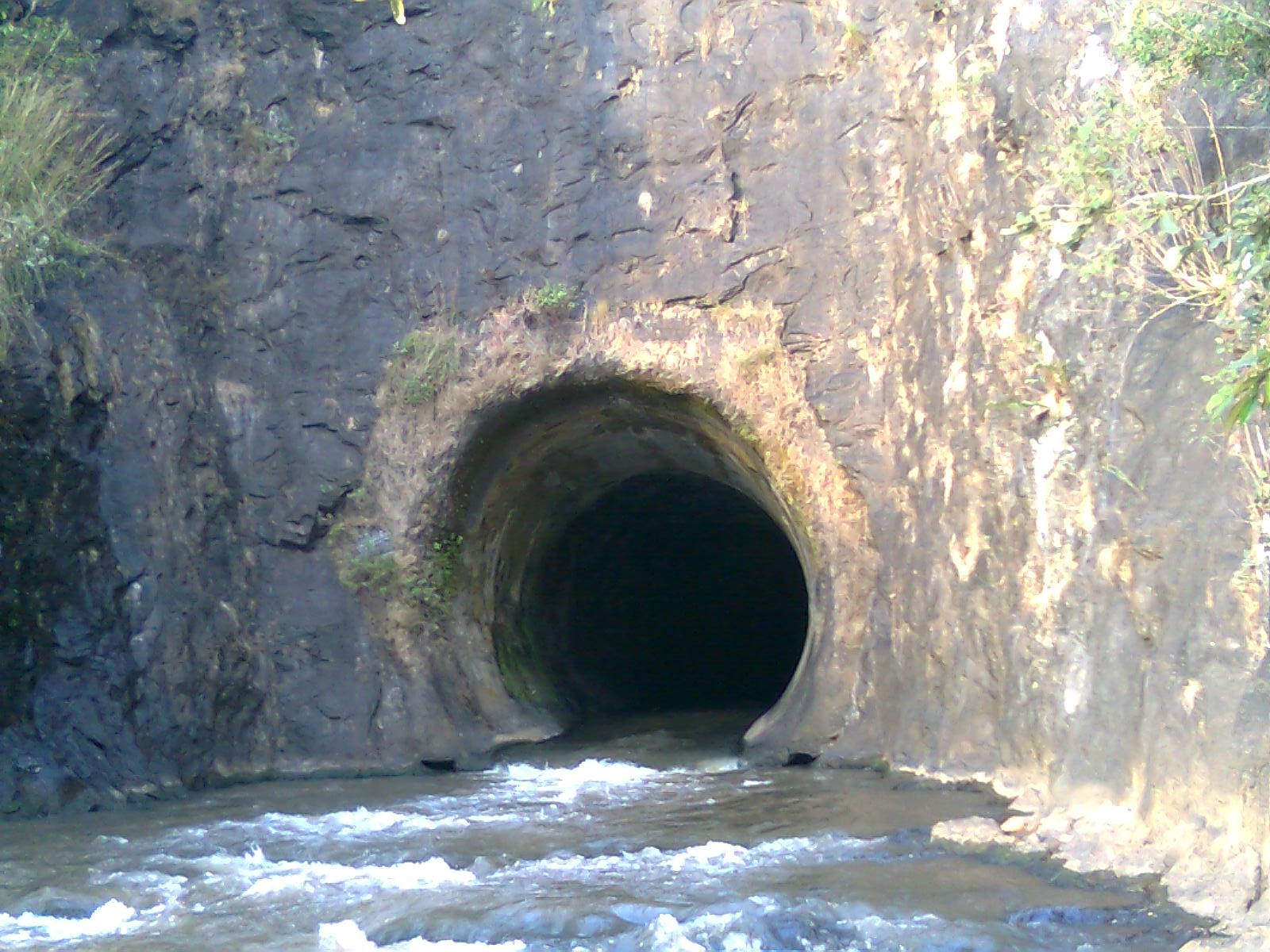
Anchuruli tunnel that diverts water from Erattayar Reservoir to Idukki reservoir

- Panchayath :Erattayar
- Village: Erattayar
- District : Idukki
- River : Perinjamkutty (Tributary of Periyar)
- Release from Dam to river : Erattayar
- Year of completion : 1975
- Type of Dam : Concrete- Gravity
- Classification : MH ( Medium Height)
- Maximum Water Level (MWL) : EL 754.38 m
- Full Reservoir Level ( FRL) : EL 754.38 m
- Storage at FRL :5.352 Mm3
- Height from deepest foundation : 19.81 m
- Length : 146.3 m
- Spillway : Ogee type – 2 Nos. Radial gates, each of size 7.62 x 6.10 m
- Name of Project : Idukki HEP
- River Outlet : 1 No. vertical lift type, 2.44 x 1.83 m
- Purpose of Project : Hydro Power

== See also ==
- calvari mount
