= Panniyar River =

River in Kerala, India

Coordinates: 10°00′N 77°13′E

- Location of mouth

Location
- Country: India
- State: Kerala
- District: Idukki District

The Panniyar River is a tributary of the Periyar River, which is the longest river in Idukki District of Kerala, India. The tributaries of the Panniyar River are the Uchilkuthipuzha, Mathikettan Puzha, Chemmannar and Nander Puzha, which originate from the hills of Matikettan National Park. Ponmudi dam is built across the river as a part of Panniyar Hydroelectric project. After generating power, the water is released to Panniyar river itself. The tailwater from the Panniyar powerhouse and the spill from Ponmudi dam reach the Kallarkutty dam. It then flows through Udumbanchola, Devikulam, Kothamangalam, Muvattupuzha, Kunnathunadu, Aluva, Kodungallur and Paravur. Panniyar is the source of drinking water for Rajakumari, Rajakkad, Shanthanpara and Senapati in Idukki district.

== See also ==
- List of rivers of India
