= Pottankad =

Pottenkad
- Village
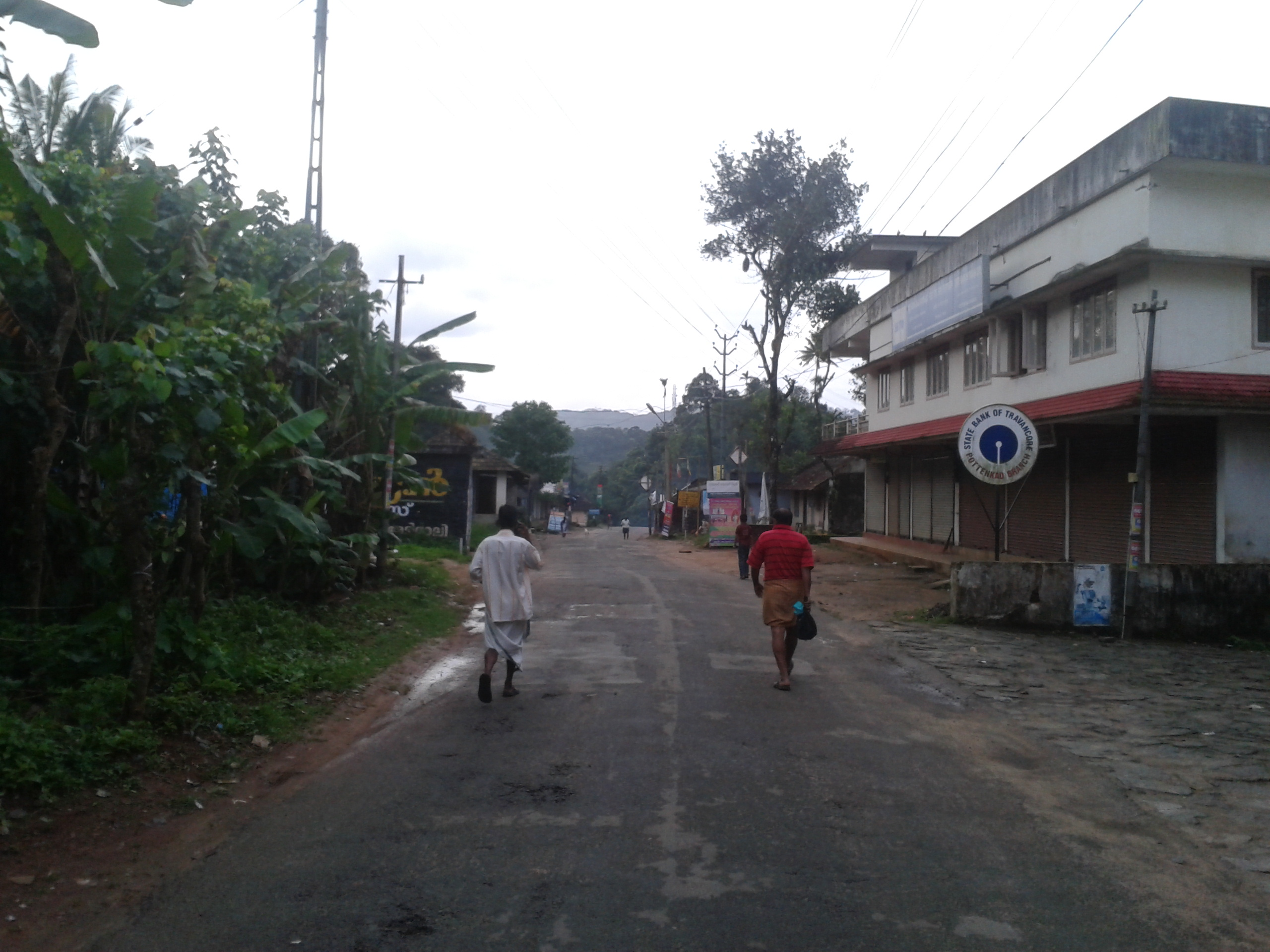
- Pottankad Town
- Interactive map of Pottenkad
- Coordinates: 10°00′33″N 77°05′00″E
- Country: India
- State: Kerala
- District: • Idukki
- Elevation: 920.5 m (3,020 ft)

Languages
  - Official: Malayalam, English
- Time zone: UTC+5:30 (IST)
- PIN: 685 569
- Vehicle registration: KL-69

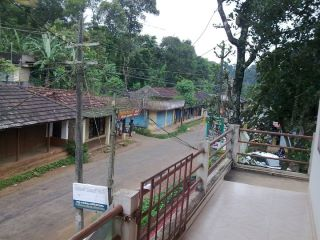
Pottankad

Pottankad is a village in the Idukki district of Kerala, India. It is about 3020 ft. above sea level.

== See also ==
- Bisonvalley
- Kunchithanny
