= Nariampara Puthiyakavu Devikshethram =

- നരിയംപാറ പുതിയകാവ് ദേവീ ക്ഷേത്രം
- Location in Kerala Nariampara Puthiyakavu Devikshethram (India)

Religion
- Affiliation: Hinduism
- District: Idukki
- Deity: Devi
- Festival: Kumbha Bharani Mahotsavam

Location
- Location: Kanchiyar
- State: Kerala
- Country: India
- Interactive map of Nariampara Puthiyakavu Devikshethram
- Coordinates: 9°45′45″N 77°5′47″E

Architecture
- Type: Traditional Kerala style
- Completed: 1989
- Elevation: 877 m (2,877 ft)

Nariampara Puthiyakavu Devikshethram is a Hindu temple located in Nariampara near Kattappana in Idukki district of Kerala state, India. The temple is situated on the Kattappana - Kuttikkanam state highway, about 3 km from Kattappana.

== History ==
Puthiyakavil Devi Temple is a family temple of Kalloorath family. This temple is co-related to Moothedathu Devi Temple at Vaikom. The story behind the co-relation is that the grandfather of Gowri Kuttapan (eldest member Kalloorath family) was a staunch believer of Moothedathu Devi. He was also the velichappadu of Moothedathu Devi Temple. The following generation did not take the position of Velichapaadu, so after the Grandfather's death, Gowri Kuttapan inherited his sword.

After her marriage with Kuttapan, Gowri settled at Kattappana. During this period Gowri Kuttapan used to light a lamp to venerate the Sword. They faced problems such as disease and poverty. Late Kuttapan conducted a Devaprasanam (astrological verification). In Devaprasanam the presence of Devi was visualised, and Devi needed shelter outside the house. So in the early 20th century, Late Kuttapan built a small building, but wished to build a proper temple.

In 1989, the Kalloorath family, headed by K.K. Thankapan, built a new temple. Family members involved the public in administering the temple, selecting 51 neighbours as the governing body.

== Festivals ==
Kumbha Bharani Mahotsavam hosted during February and March is the most noted festival of the temple.
