= Ponmudi Dam =

Dam in Kerala, India

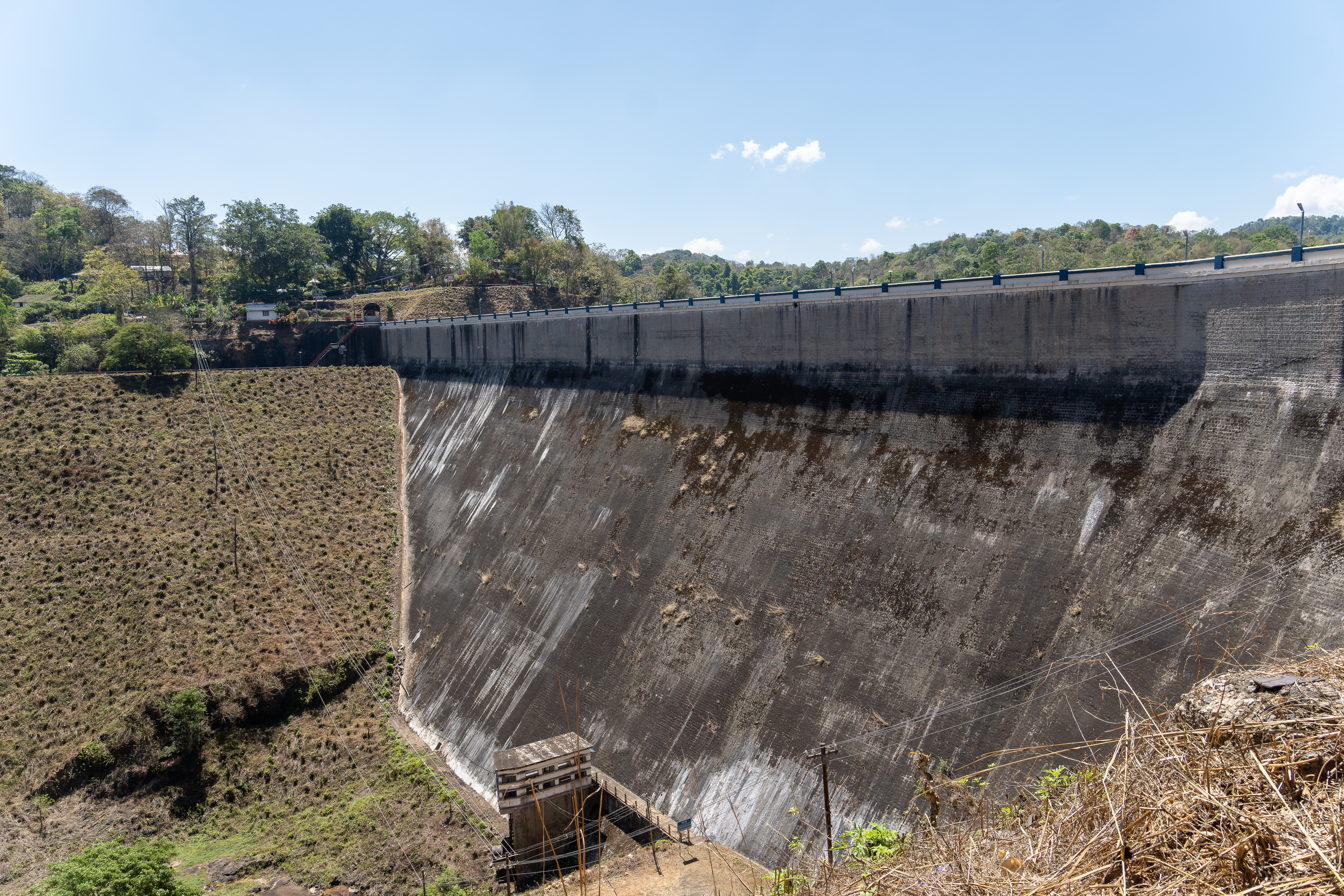

- Location within Kerala Location within India
- Country: India
- Location: Idukki, Kerala
- Coordinates: 9°57′37″N 77°03′24″E
- Purpose: Power
- Status: Operational
- Opening date: 1963 (63 years ago)
- Owner: Kerala State Electricity Board

Dam and spillways
- Type of dam: Gravity dam
- Impounds: Panniyar river
- Height (foundation): 57.60 m (189.0 ft)
- Length: 288.8 m (948 ft)
- Elevation at crest: 701.35 m (2,301.0 ft)
- Spillways: 3 nos, radial gates, each of size 10.97 x6.4 m
- Spillway type: Ogee type
- Spillway capacity: 1416.3 m³/s

Reservoir
- Creates: Ponmudi Reservoir
- Total capacity: 51,540,000 m^{3} (1.820×10^{9} cu ft)
- Active capacity: 47,400,000 m^{3} (1.67×10^{9} cu ft)
- Catchment area: 221.75 km^{2} (85.62 sq mi)
- Maximum water depth: 708.66 m (2,325.0 ft)
- Normal elevation: 707.75 m (2,322.0 ft)

Panniar Power Station
- Coordinates: 9°58′23″N 77°01′41″E
- Operator: Kerala State Electricity Board
- Commission date: 1963 (63 years ago)
- Turbines: 2 x 16.2 MW (Francis-type)
- Installed capacity: 32.4 MW
- Annual generation: 158 MU
- Website; Official website

The Ponmudi Dam is a concrete gravity dam built across the Panniyar River which is a tributary of Periyar River at Konnathady panchayati raj of Konnathadi village in Idukki district of Kerala, India. The dam was constructed in 1963 as a part of a hydroelectric project and is 288.80 m (947.5 ft) long. The hydropower component of the dam has an installed capacity of 30 MW with firm power of 17 MW, generating 158 GWh annually. Taluks through which the river flow are Udumbanchola, Devikulam, Kothamangalam, Muvattupuzha, Kunnathunadu, Aluva, Kodungalloor and Paravur.

== Location ==
The dam, located near Munnar on the Panniar river in the Periyar river valley in Kerala, is part of the basin of the West flowing rivers of the Tadri to Kanyakumari. The nearest city is Udumbanchola. Mattupetty to Ponmudi dam is a distance of 39 kilometres (24 mi).

== Features ==
The Ponmudi dam is a masonry gravity dam of 59 metres (194 ft) height with a total length of 294 metres (965 ft). At the Full Reservoir Level, the gross storage capacity of the reservoir is 51,540,000 cubic metres (1.820×10^{9} cu ft) and live storage is 47,400,000 cubic metres (1.67×10^{9} cu ft). The dam has a total volumetric content of 181,000 cubic metres (6,400,000 cu ft). The dam is located in Seismic Zone-III. The reservoir water spread area or submergence area is 2.79 square metres (30.0 sq ft). The spillway is designed for a design discharge of 1,416.03 cubic metres (50,007 cu ft) per second. The flood discharge is routed through a spillway which is fitted with three radial gates, each 10.9728 by 6.4008 metres (36.000 ft × 21.000 ft). The stored water is diverted through a tunnel of 3,066 metres (10,059 ft) for power generation creating a head of 220 metres (720 ft).

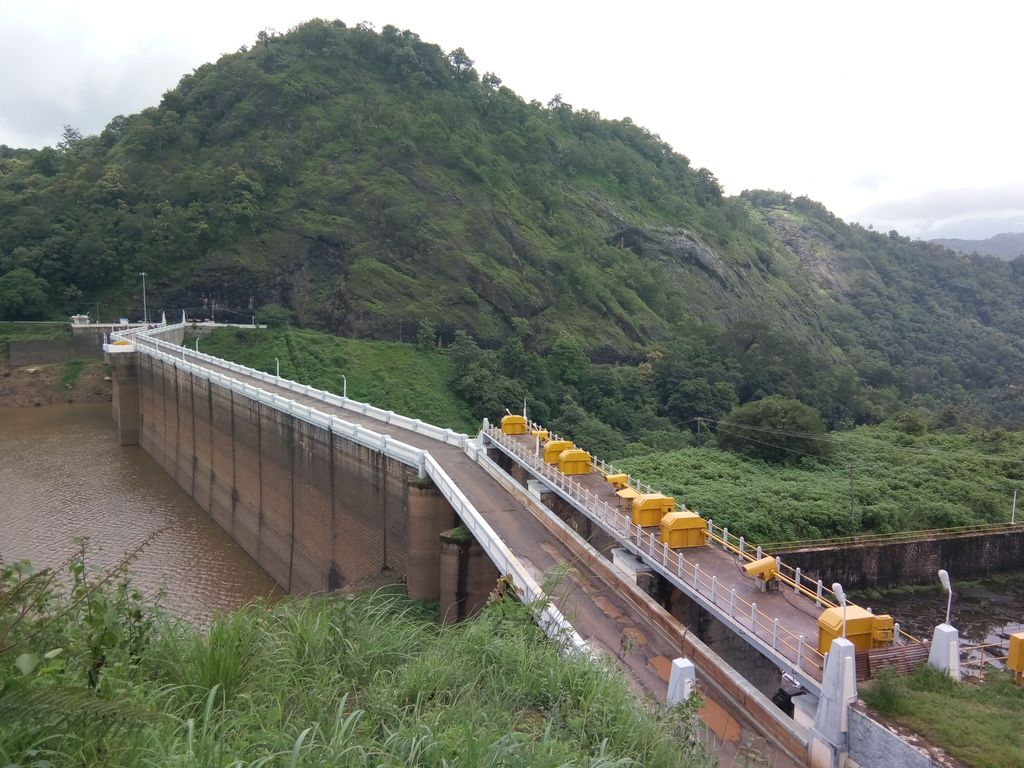
Barrage and reservoir

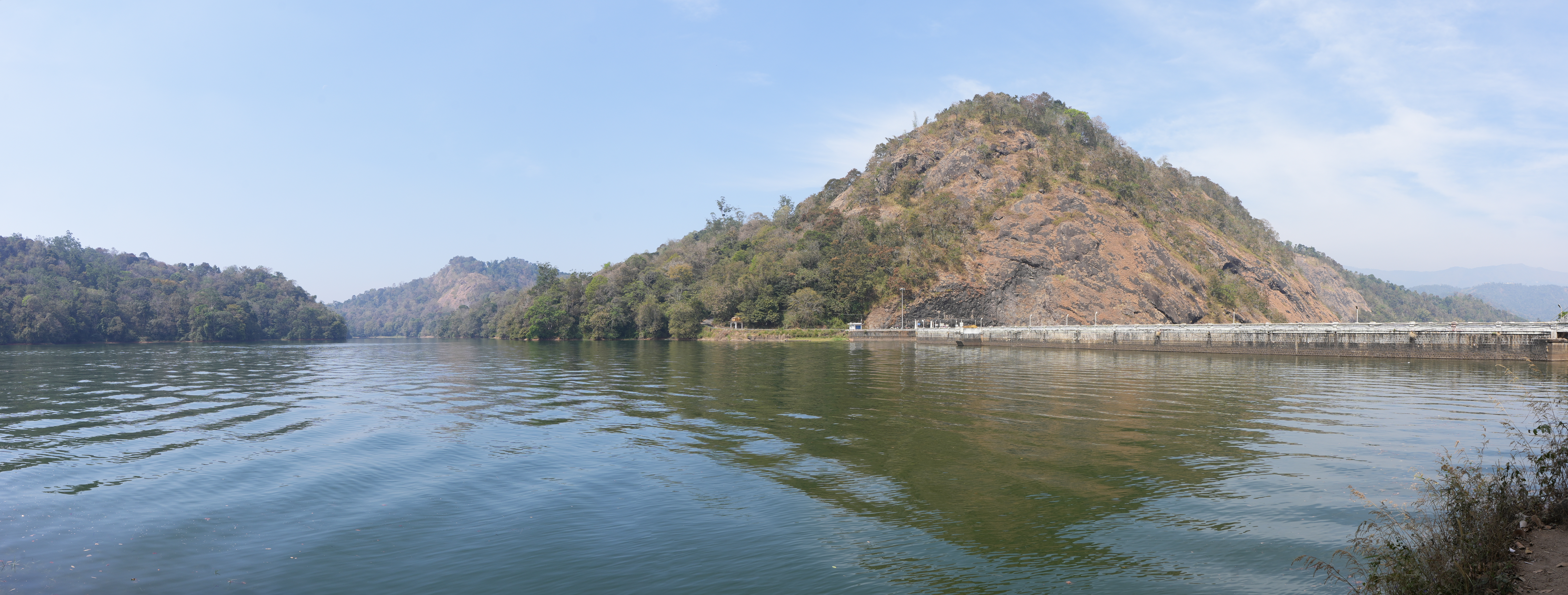
Reservoir

== Hydro power development ==
The water stored in the reservoir is utilized for power generation by diverting the flows through a 3,066-metre (10,059 ft) tunnel followed by two lines of penstock pipes each with a diameter of 1.7 metres (5 ft 7 in) and a length of 762 metres (2,500 ft). The two penstock pipe lines are designed to carry a discharge of 17.88 cubic metres (631 cu ft) per second. The power station located at Panniyar is provided with installation of 30 MW comprising two units, each of 15 MW capacity Francis turbines. The firm power generation is 17 MW and the annual power generated is 158 GWh. The first unit was commissioned on 29 December 1963 and the second unit on 26 January 1964. The units were renovated in 2001 and 2003.

== Major disaster ==
In a major disaster at the project site, which occurred 17 September 2007, one of the penstock valves burst causing the death of 7 people, destroying 15 houses, and damaging 150 acres (61 ha) of crops. The reason attributed to the pipe burst is the loosening of the flange bolt connection. The damaged valve was rectified in July 2009.
