= K. K. Jayachandran =

Indian politician

Member of the Kerala Legislative Assembly
- In office May 2001 – 1 June 2016
- Preceded by: E. M. Augusty
- Succeeded by: M. M. Mani
- Constituency: Udumbanchola

Personal details
- Born: 20 December 1951 (age 74) Kunchithanny, Kottayam, State of Travancore–Cochin (present day Idukki, Kerala), India
- Party: Communist Party of India (Marxist)
- Spouse: Sreedevi
- Children: 2

Kunchithanny Krishnan Jayachandran (born 20 December 1951) is an Indian politician and an ex–Member of the Kerala Legislative Assembly, who represented the Udumbanchola constituency from 2001 to 2016. He belongs to the Communist Party of India (Marxist).

== Positions held ==
- Secretary, C.P.I.(M) Adimali Local Committee (1972)
- Area Secretary, C.P.I.(M), Rajakkad
- Secretary, K.S.Y.F. Taluk Committee
- Devikulam Estate Employees Union, C.I.T.U.
- Idukki District Committee, C.P.I.(M)
- Idukki District Committee; Chairman, SERIFED
- State Secretary, C.I.T.U.
- Member, C.P.I.(M) State Committee

== Personal life ==
He is the son of Krishnan and Janaki. He was born at Vellathooval on 20 December 1951. He is married to Sreedevi and has two children.
