= Anavilasam =

- village
- Location in Kerala, India Anavilasam (India)
- Coordinates: 9.6449600°N 77.1454400°E
- Country: India
- State: Kerala
- District: Idukki
- Taluk: Udumbanchola

Government
  - Body: Chakkupallam Grama Panchayat

Area
  - Total: 29.93 km^{2} (11.56 sq mi)

Population (2011)
  - Total: 7,549
  - Density: 252.2/km^{2} (653.3/sq mi)

Languages
  - Official: Malayalam, English
- Time zone: UTC+5:30 (IST)
- Vehicle registration: KL-37, KL-06

Anavilasam is a village in Idukki district in the Indian state of Kerala.

== Demographics ==
As of 2011 Census, Anavilasam had a population of 7,549 with 3,730 males and 3,819 females. Anavilasam village has an area of 29.63 km^{2} (11.44 sq mi) with 2,006 families residing in it. In Anavilasam, 8.6% of the population was under 6 years of age. Anavilasam had an average literacy of 87% higher than the national average of 74% and lower than state average of 94%; male literacy was 91% and female literacy was 83.2%.
