= Anchuruli =

Tourist destination in Kerala, India

- Tourist destination
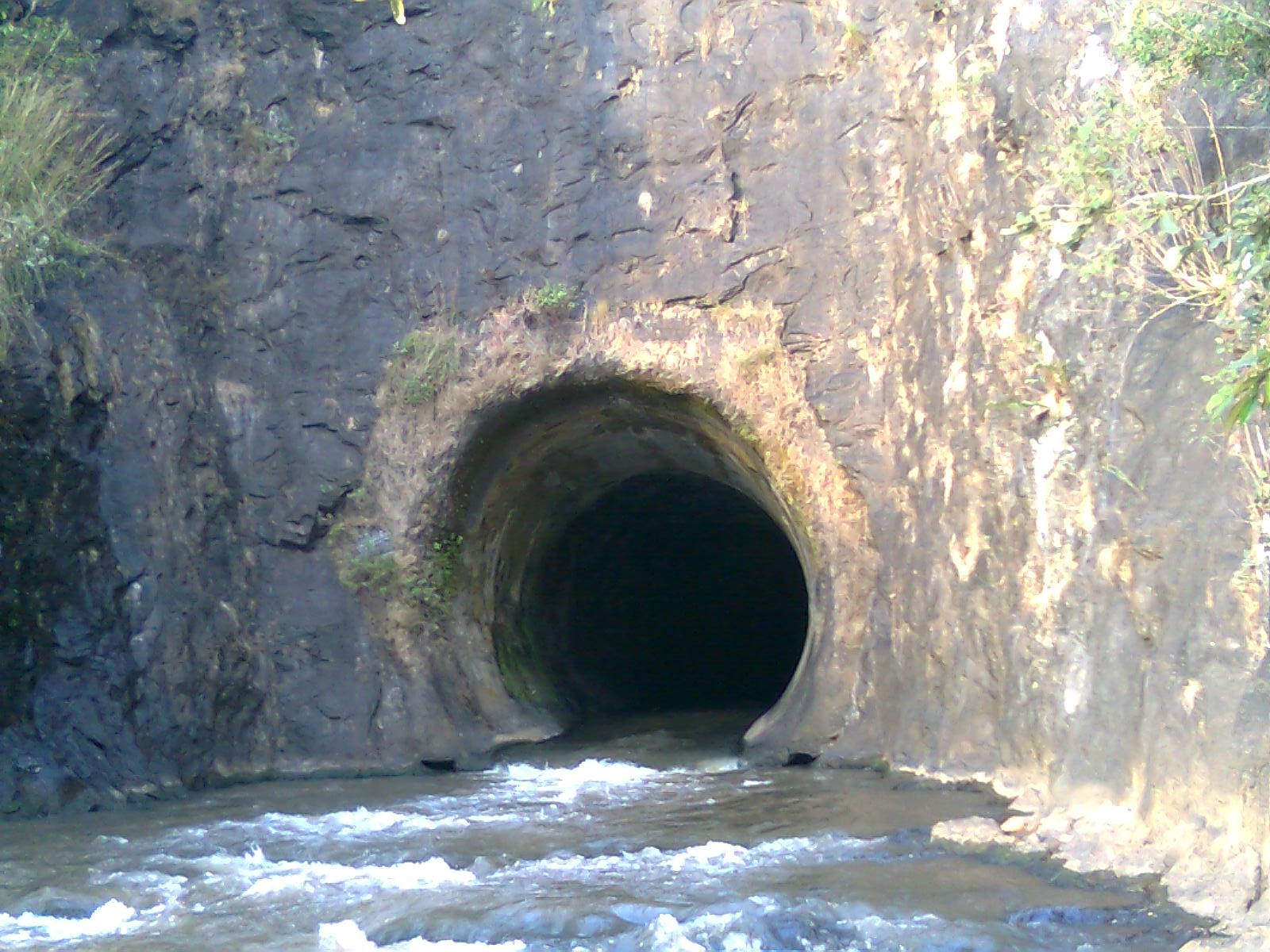
- Anchuruli tunnel
- Interactive map of Anchuruli
- Location in Kerala, India Anchuruli (India)
- Coordinates: 9°46′17″N 77°04′29″E
- Country: India
- State: Kerala
- District: Idukki
- Taluk: Idukki

Government
  - Type: Panchayath
  - Body: Kanchiyar Grama Panchayat
- Elevation: 755 m (2,477 ft)

Languages
  - Official: Malayalam, English
- Time zone: UTC+5:30 (IST)
- PIN: 685511
- Area code: 04868
- Vehicle registration: KL-06, KL-37
- Nearest town: Kattappana

Anchuruli, also spelled Anjuruli, is a popular tourist destination located in Kanchiyar panchayat in Idukki district, Kerala state, India. Anchuruli is famous for the 5.5 km (3.4 mi) long circular tunnel that carries water from Erattayar dam to Idukki reservoir.

== Etymology ==
The name Anchuruli literally means 'five vessels'. It is associated with the five small hills which are in the shape of inverted vessels and are visible when the water level in Idukki reservoir reduces.

== Location ==
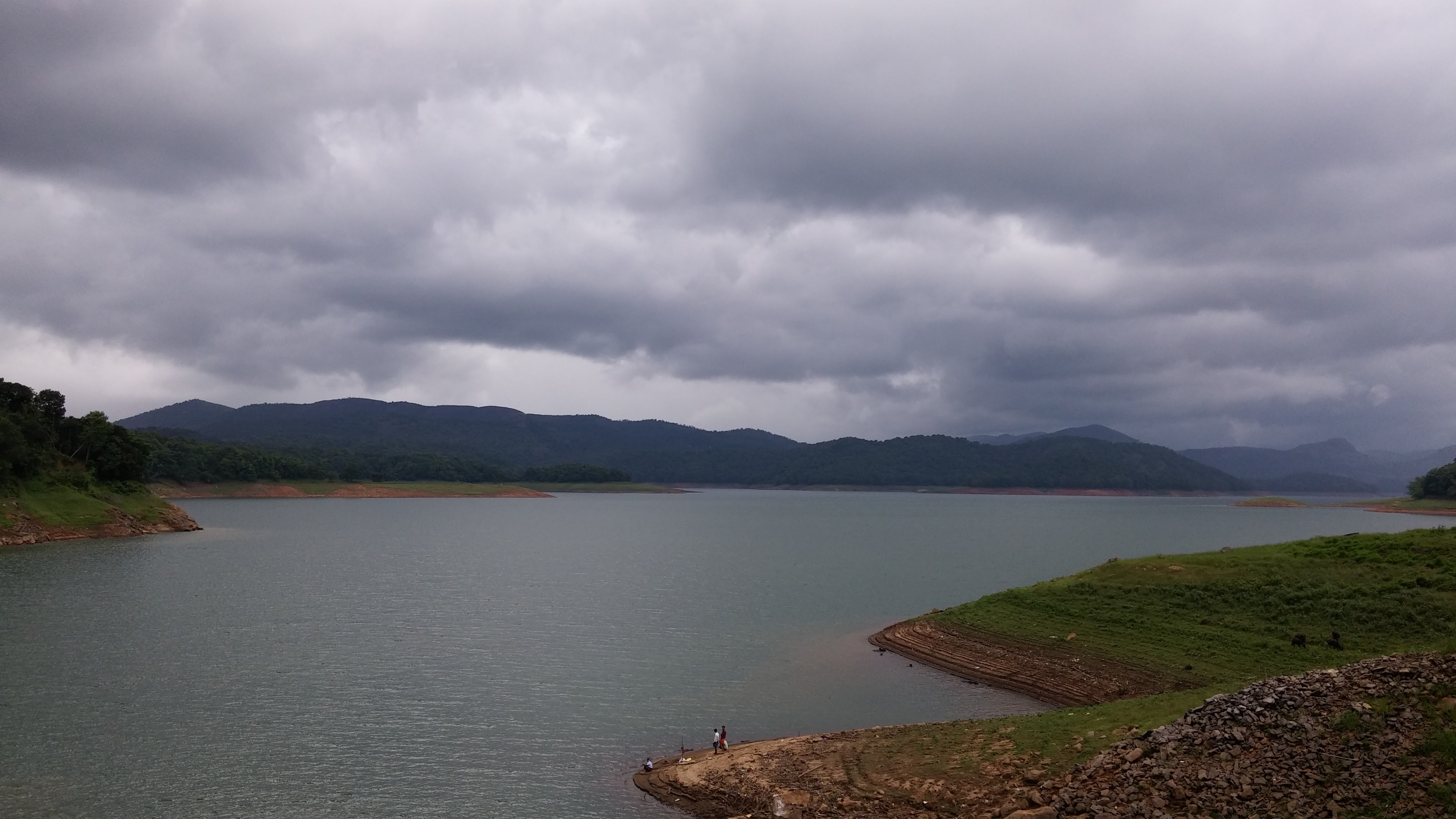
Idukki reservoir as seen from Anchuruli tunnel

The elevation of Anchuruli ranges from 740 m (2,430 ft) above mean sea level. It lies in the Kanchiyar grama panchayath in the newly formed Idukki constituency. The place can be accessed from Kanchiyar (3 km) which is on the Kattappana - Kuttikkanam state highway (SH-59).

== Proposals for tourism development ==
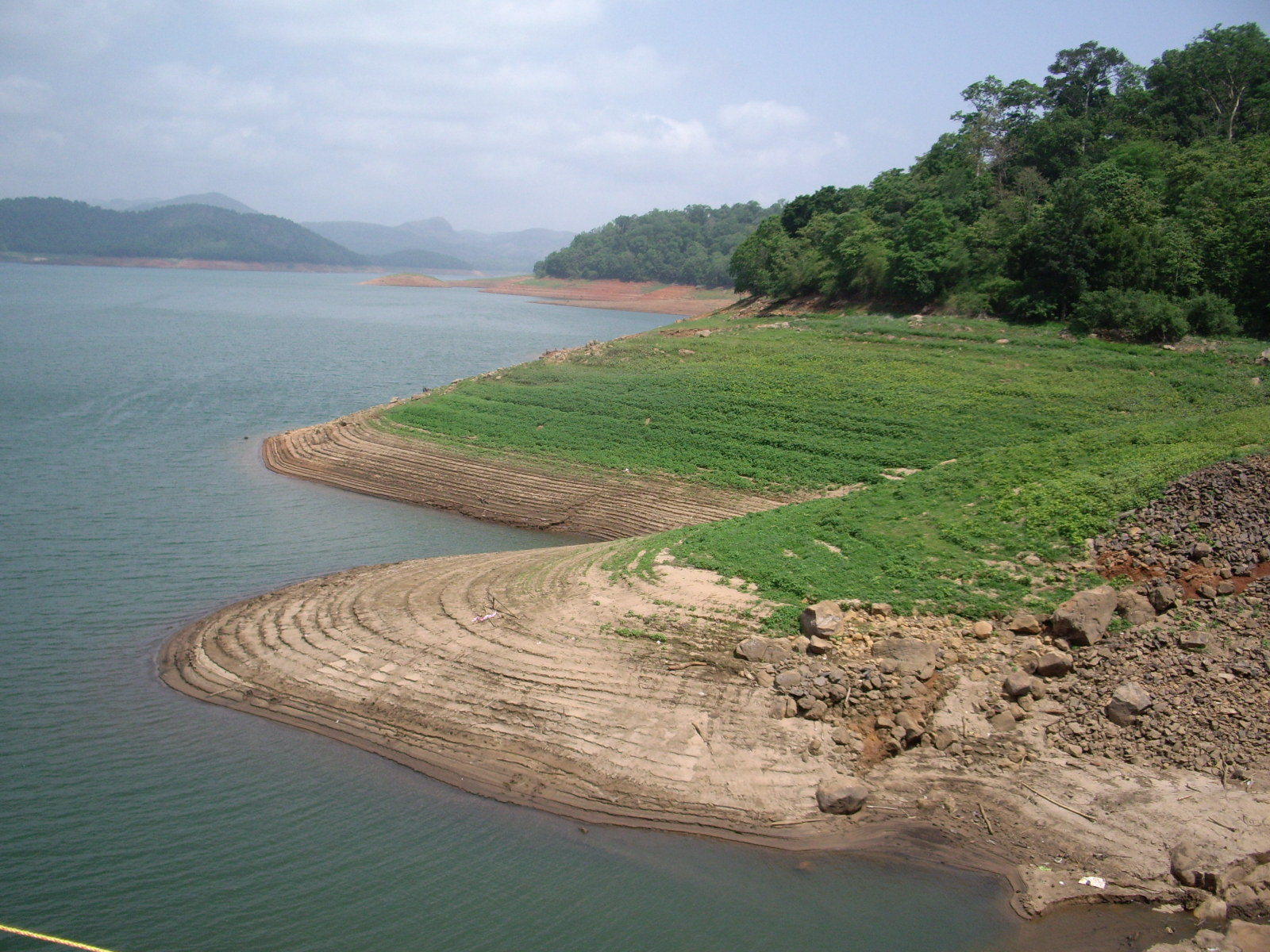
View of Idukki reservoir during summer from Anchuruli

Anchuruli at present is on the eve of a major tourism development which would be fulfilled soon. The panchayath is planning several strategies for the upliftment of Anchuruli into a major tourist destination in the district by combining the nearby Ayyappancoil village, which holds an ancient Sastha shrine and a hanging (suspension) bridge. Several proposals are also made regarding the boat service to Cheruthoni through the Idukki reservoir. If the proposals became fruitful, the journey to Cheruthoni will take only 20 minutes and it would be a great relief to the locals who have to travel about 30 km distance by road.

== Filming location ==
The climax scene of 2014 Malayalam movie Iyobinte Pusthakam was shot in Anchuruli tunnel. Sequences of movies like Lord Livingstone 7000 Kandi, Maramkothi and Raksha were shot here.In the movie Lokah Chapter 1, Kalyani Priyadarshan and Sunny Wayne scene was shoot here.
