= Pachady =

- Village
- Location in Kerala, India Pachady (India)
- Coordinates: 09°50′34.04″N 77°07′44.69″E
- Country: India
- State: Kerala
- District: Idukki

Languages
  - Official: Malayalam, English, Tamil,
- Time zone: UTC+5:30 (IST)
- PIN: 685553
- Nearest city: Ernakulam
- Lok Sabha constituency: UDUMBANCHOLA

Pachady is an agricultural village situated in the state of Kerala and the Idukki district under Udumbanchola taluk in India. It is situated 4 km away from Nedumkandam Town. It is a hilly area with most of the population working in cardamom plantations.
