= Moongapara =

- Village
- Location within Kerala Location within India
- Coordinates: 9.908116°N 77.021402°E
- Country: India
- State: Kerala
- District: Idukki
- Elevation: 860 m (2,820 ft)

Languages
  - Official: Malayalam, English
- Time zone: UTC+5:30 (IST)
- PIN: 685609
- Telephone code: 914868
- Vehicle registration: KL-06
- Nearest Railway Station: Ernakulam (Aluva)
- Website: www.thopramkudy.org

Moongapara is a village near Thopramkudy in the Taluk of Udumbanchola in Idukki District. The moongapara city is actually a junction. There is a temple for murugan.
