= Kannambadi, Idukki =

Kannampady Kannampady, Kannampady
- Tribal settlement
- Location in Kerala, India Kannampady (India)
- Coordinates: 9.7210933°N 76.9950384°E
- Country: India
- State: Kerala
- District: Idukki

Government
  - Type: Panchayath
  - Body: Upputhara grama panchayath

Languages
  - Official: Malayalam, English
- Time zone: UTC+5:30 (IST)
- PIN: 685505
- Telephone code: 04869
- Vehicle registration: KL-37
- Nearest cities: Upputhara, Kattappana
- Lok Sabha constituency: Idukki

Kannampady or Kannampady is a remote tribal settlement located inside the Idukki Wildlife Sanctuary and near the Idukki Hydro Electric Project area in the district of Idukki in Kerala, India. It is noted for its beautiful sceneries and the old government tribal school, started in 1956.

== Access ==
The nearest town to Kannambady is Upputhara, which is located about 14 km southeast. Privately operated buses provides services to Kannambady from Kattappana and Upputhara.

=== Distances from nearby places ===
- Kattappana - 32 km
- Pasuppara - 13 km
- Kottamala - 13 km
- Kozhimala - 21 km
