= Poopara =

Pooparai
- village
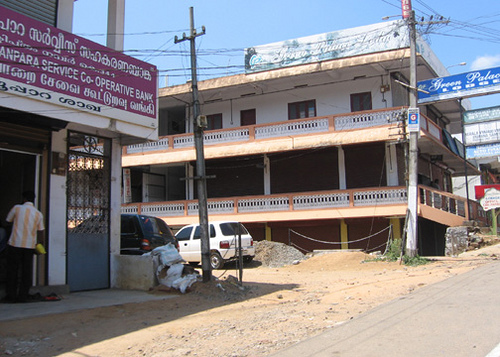
- Poopara Junction

- Location in Kerala, India Pooparai (India)
- Coordinates: 9.9803°N 77.2031°E
- Country: India
- State: Kerala
- District: Idukki district
- Taluk: Udumbanchola

Government
  - Body: Santhanpara Grama Panchayat

Area
  - Total: 41.05 km^{2} (15.85 sq mi)

Population (2011)
  - Total: 8,231
  - Density: 200.5/km^{2} (519.3/sq mi)

Languages
  - Official: Tamil, English
  - Regional: Tamil, Malayalam
- Time zone: UTC+5:30 (IST)
- PIN: 685613,685619
- Vehicle registration: KL-69

Pooparai is a village in Idukki district in the Indian state of Kerala. It is located in the cardamom-growing region of Kerala, and also houses a number of tea and coffee plantations. The place also intersects the Munnar - Kumily state highway (SH-19) and Kochi - Dhanushkodi national highway (NH-49). The Anayirankal reservoir is 4 km up the road from Poopara.

== Demographics ==
As of 2011 Census, Pooparai had a population of 8,231 with 4,137 males and 4,094 females. Poopara village has an area of 41.05 km^{2} (15.85 sq mi) with 2,267 families residing in it. In Poopara, 8.8% of the total population was under 6 years of age. Pooparai had an average literacy of 77.9% higher than the national average of 74% and lower than state average of 94%.

== Views of Pooparai ==
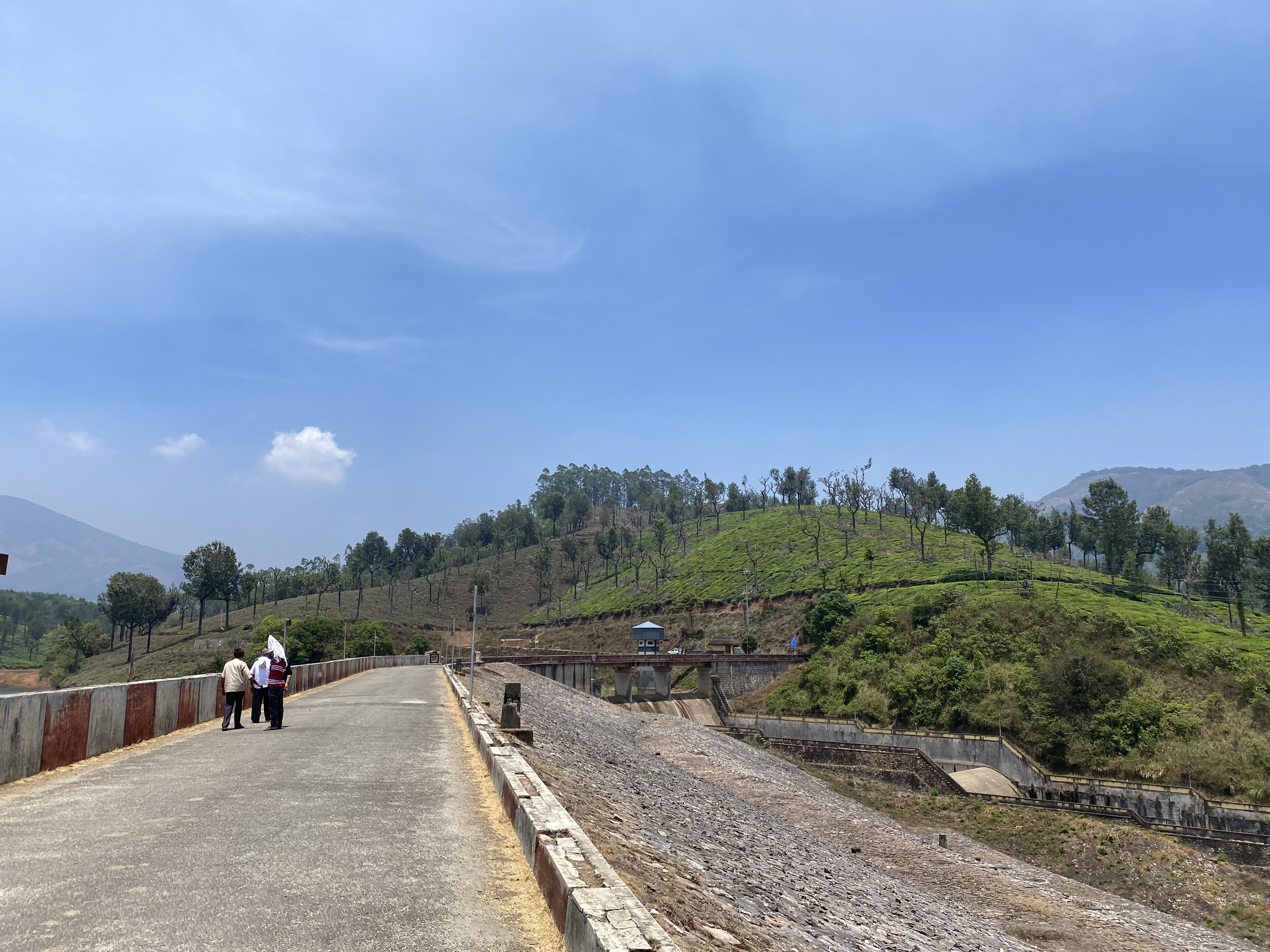
Anayirankal Dam

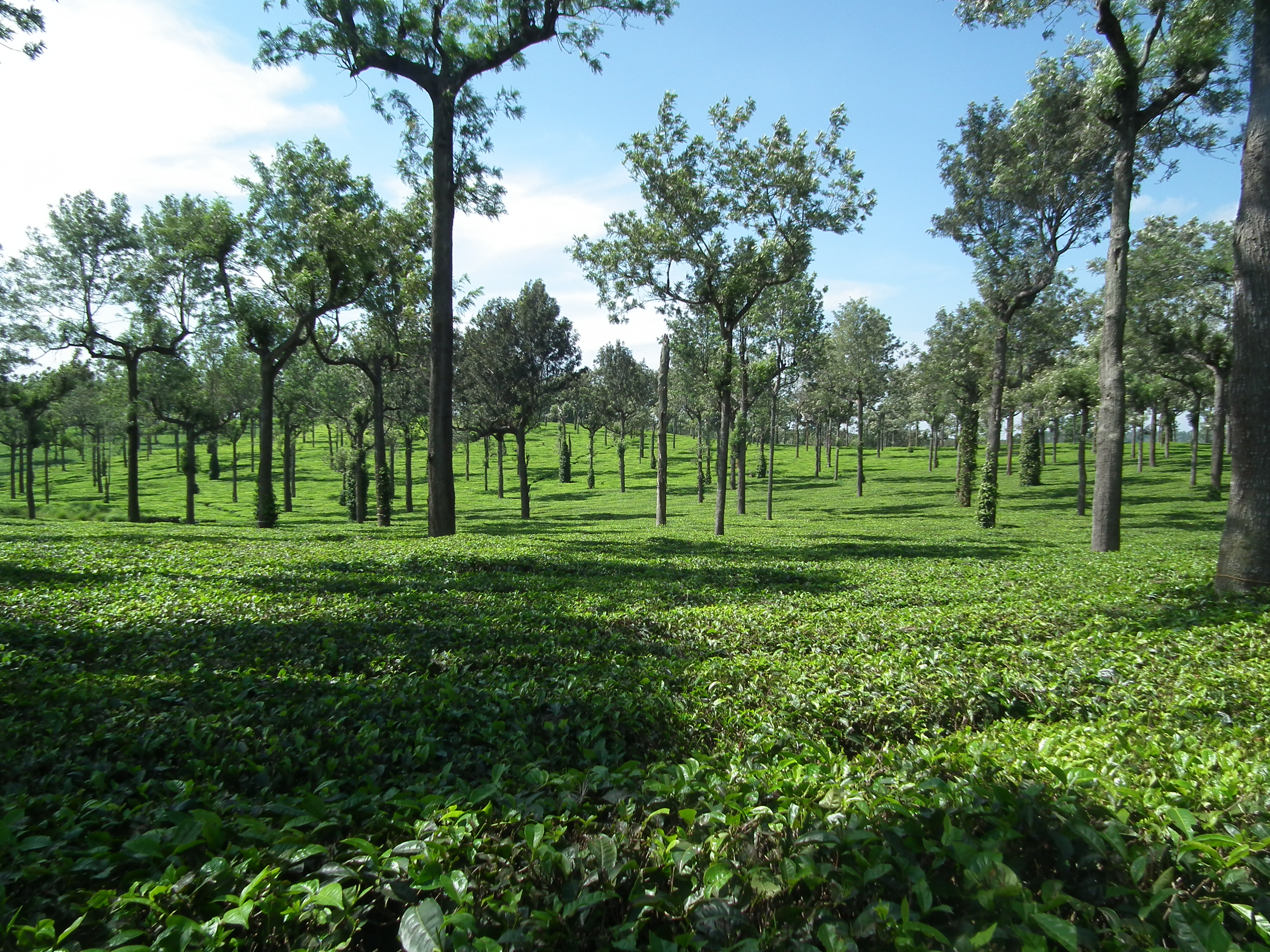
Tea plantations in Poopara
