= Bisonvalley =

- village
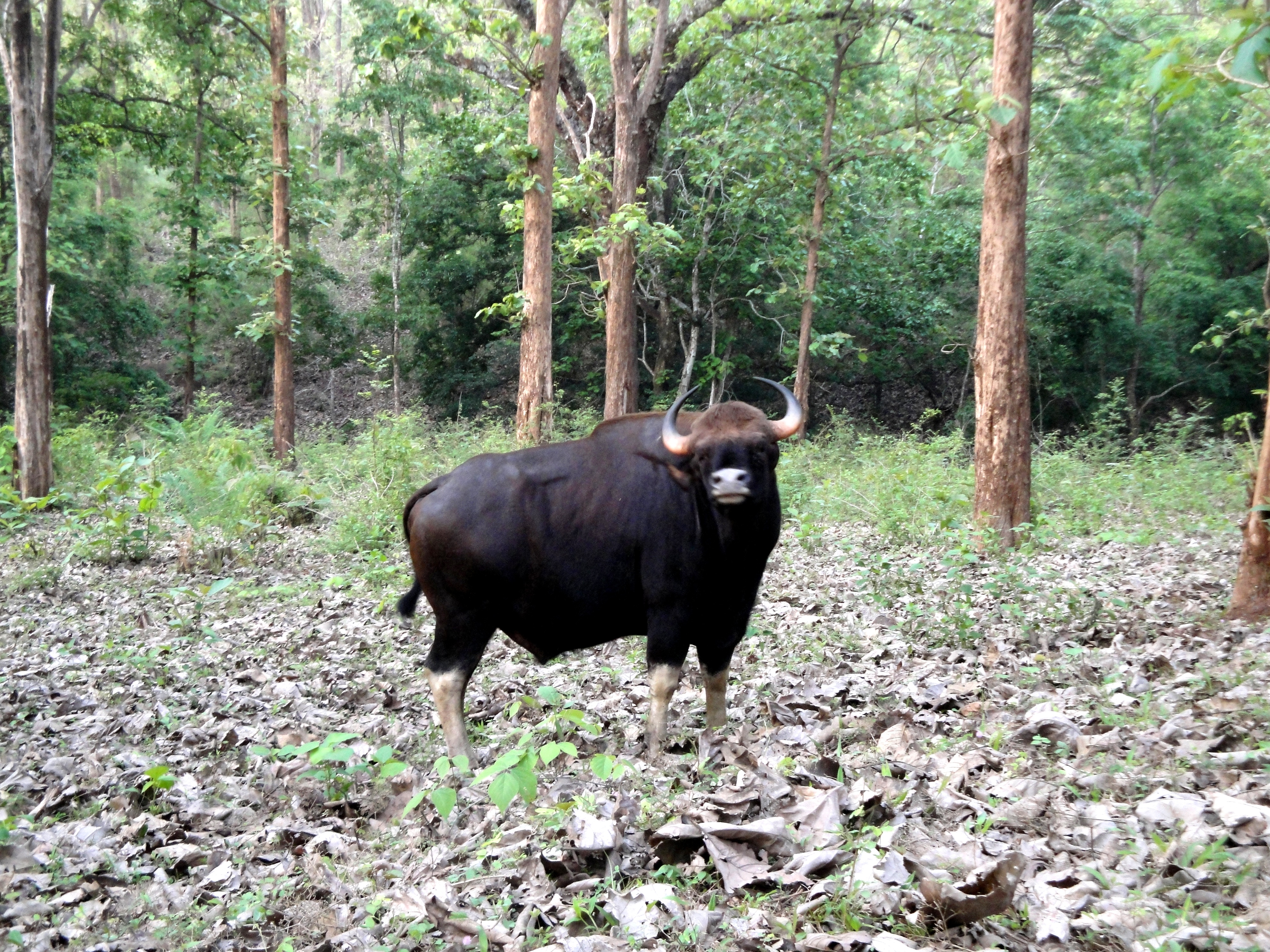
- Bison

- Location in Kerala, India
- Coordinates: 10°0′0″N 77°4′0″E
- Country: India
- State: Kerala
- District: Idukki

Government
  - Type: Panchayati Raj (India)

Area
  - Total: 32.62 km^{2} (12.59 sq mi)

Population (2011)
  - Total: 12,653
  - Density: 387.9/km^{2} (1,005/sq mi)

Languages
  - Official: Malayalam, English
  - Minority: Tamil
- Time zone: UTC+5:30 (IST)
- PIN: 685565
- Vehicle registration: KL-69
- Nearest city: Munnar

Bison valley is a village in Udumbanchola taluk in the Idukki district of the southwestern Indian state of Kerala. Bison valley is situated at around 914 metres (3000 ft) above mean sea level, in the Western Ghats range of mountains.

== Demographics ==
As of 2011 Census, Bisonvally had a population of 12,653 among which 6,332 are males and 6,321 are females. Bisonvalley village has an area of 32.62 km^{2} (12.59 sq mi) with 3,163 families residing in it. In Bisonvalley, 9.9% of the population was under 6 years of age. Bisonvalley had an average literacy of 93% higher than the national average of 74% and lower than state average of 94%.
