= Kalkoonthal =

- village
- Location in Kerala, India Kalkoonthal (India)
- Coordinates: 9°51′0″N 77°8′0″E
- Country: India
- State: Kerala
- District: Idukki

Area
  - Total: 62.77 km^{2} (24.24 sq mi)

Population (2011)
  - Total: 42,006
  - Density: 669.2/km^{2} (1,733/sq mi)

Languages
  - Official: Malayalam, English
- Time zone: UTC+5:30 (IST)

Kalkoonthal is a village in Idukki district in the Indian state of Kerala.

== Demographics ==
As of 2011 India census, Kalkoonthal had a population of 42006 with 21158 males and 20848 females.
