= Kanchiyar =

- Village
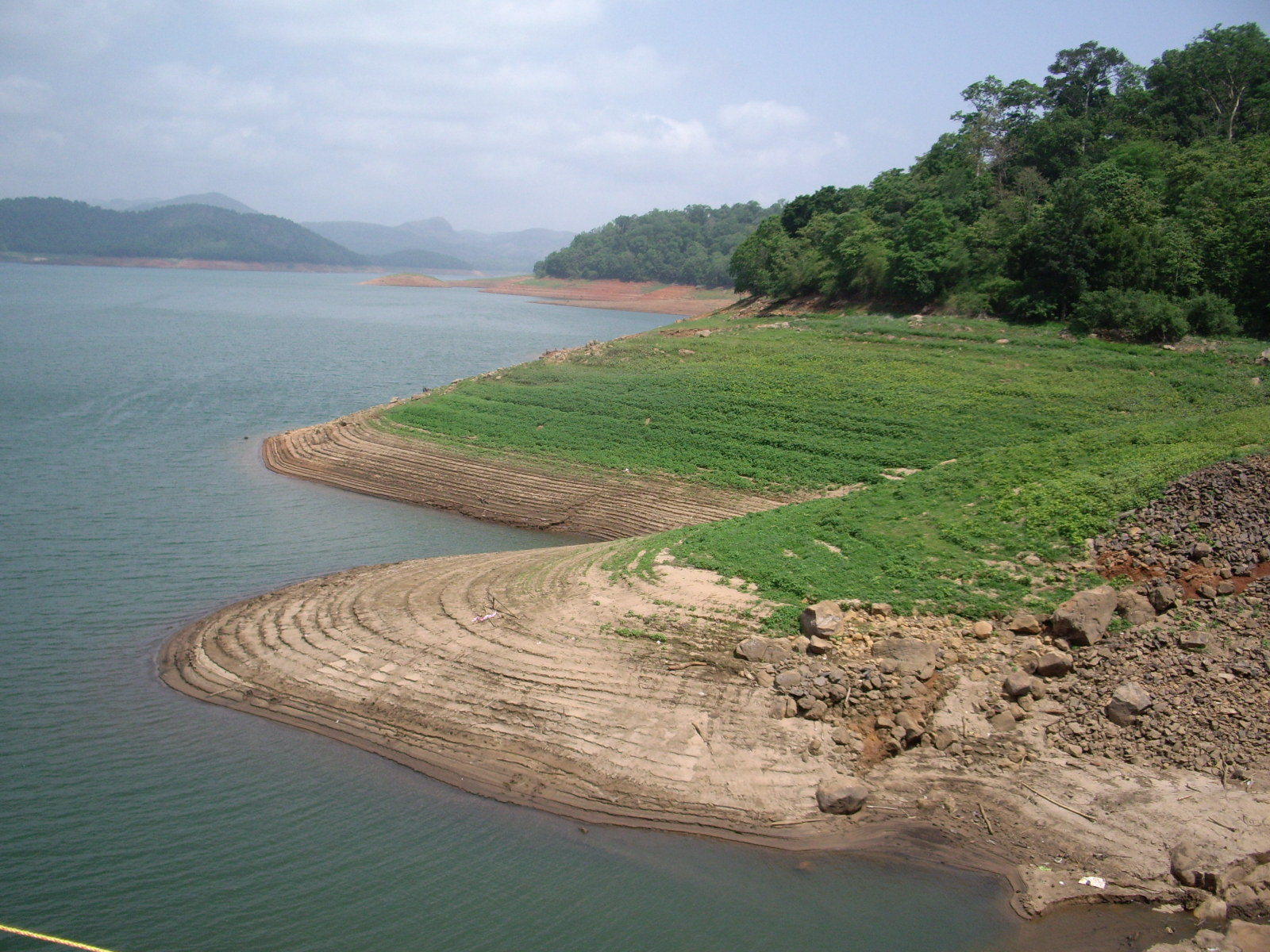
- View of Idukki reservoir at Anchuruli

- Location of Kanchiyar in Kerala Kanchiyar (India)
- Coordinates: 9°41′45″N 76°59′47″E
- Country: India
- State: Kerala
- District: Idukki
- Named for: Anjuruli tourist spot

Government
  - Type: Panchayath
  - Body: Kanchiyar Grama Panchayath

Area
  - Total: 64.65 km^{2} (24.96 sq mi)

Population (2011)
  - Total: 22,513
  - Density: 348.2/km^{2} (901.9/sq mi)

Languages
  - Official: Malayalam, English
- Time zone: UTC+5:30 (IST)
- PIN: 685511
- Telephone code: 04868
- Vehicle registration: KL-37, KL-06
- Nearest city: Kattappana
- Lok Sabha constituency: Idukki
- Literacy: 92%
- Climate: cool pleasant (Köppen)
- Website: Isgkerala.in

Kanchiyar is a village located in Idukki taluk of Idukki district, Kerala, India. The place has a vast cardamom and pepper plantations. Anchuruli, one of the famous tourist spots in Idukki district is located in Kanchiyar panchayath. The main settlements in Kanchiyar are Kozhimala, Swaraj, Labbakkada, Thoppipala, Mattappally and Kakkattukada.

== Administration ==
Kanchiyar panchayath, which was recently raised to village level is divided into 16 wards for administrative convenience. The Kanchiyar village office is at Lebbakkada.

=== Wards ===
Wards in Kanchiyar panchayath
Kovilmala
Pampadikuzhi
Thoppippala
Lebbakkada
Pezhumkandam
Puthukkadu
East Mattukkatta
Nariyampara
Kanchiyar
Anchuruly
Vengaloorkkada
Swarnavilasam
Meppara
Kalthotty
Kodalippara
Murikkattukudy

== Demographics ==
There are almost 400 families of different cast and religion. As of 2001 census data, Kanchiyar village has population of about 21,023 in which 10,404 are women and 10,619 are men. The village has a literacy of about 92%. Kanchiyar village was bifurcated from Ayyappancoil village after Idukki taluk formation. Earlier, it was part of the Ayyappancoil village.

== Religion ==
Majority of people are Hindus and Christians. They maintain healthy relations and mutual co-operation. The Clarist Convent started its career in 1957 in the land donated by Shri Mathai Kalappurackal. The L.S.T. Convent began its missionary work on 7 January 1996. The Snehashram for destitute, under the guardianship of Rev. Fr. Francis OFM is at Nariyampara, the board of this parish.

=== Important pilgrim centers ===
- St.Mary's church, Kanchiyar-Pallikavala
- St.Joseph Church, Kanchiyar Pezhumkandam
- Holy cross church, Nariyampara
- India Pentecostal Church of God, Kanchiyar
- Assemblies of God in India, Kanchiyar
- The Pentecostal Mission, Kanchiyar
- Holy family church, Kalthotty
- Lourde Matha church, Meppara
- Subramaniya Swami temple, Pezhumkandom
- Puthiyakavu Devi temple, Nariyampara
- Ayyappa-Mahavishnu-Devi temple, Nariyampara
- Sree Mahavishnu temple, Meppara
- Sree Dharmasastha temple, Thoppippala
- Sree Krishna Swami temple, Mattappally
- Muthiyamma Uma Maheshwara temple, Kanchiyar

== Culture ==
Kanchiyar panchayath is inhabited by the tribal community Mannan. The Mannan community has unique culture and rituals. They have a kingdom at Kozhimala (Kovilmala) near Swaraj with an elected tribal king. This community is the only tribal community in Kerala that has a king, and one of the only two such tribes in India. The current king here is Raman Raja Mannan who was elected in March 2012. He was elected after the death of the previous king, Aryan Raja Mannan.

== Education ==
Kanchiyar panchayath is served by several schools and nurseries, including:

- Lourde Matha L.P. School, Lebbakkada
- Govt. L.P. School, Kanchiyar
- St.Mary's L.P School, Kanchiyar
- St.Mary's U.P school, Kanchiyar
- Mannam Memorial High School, Nariyampara
- Government Tribal H.S.S, Murikkattukudi
- Zion Public School, Swaraj
- S.N English Medium School, Thoppipala
- J.P.M College of Arts and Science, Lebbakkada
- Mar Mathew Kavukattu Memorial Nursery
- Marian Nursery School

== Transportation ==
Kanchiyar is well connected with both state highways and local rural roads. Kattappana-Kuttikkanam state highway passes through Kanchiyar. Plenty of private buses and state-owned buses operates here.

== See also ==
Kattappana
