= Senapathy Venu =

Indian politician

Senapathy Venu is a politician from Kerala, India. He is a member of the Kerala Legislative Assembly. He represents Udumbanchola assembly constituency in 16th Kerala State Legislative Assembly. He belongs to Indian National Congress.
