= Santhanpara =

- Village
- Location in Kerala, India Santhanpara (India)
- Coordinates: 9°58′0″N 77°13′0″E
- Country: India
- State: Kerala
- District: Idukki
- Taluk: Udumbanchola

Government
  - Type: Grama Panchayat

Area
  - Total: 36.43 km^{2} (14.07 sq mi)

Population (2011)
  - Total: 6,782
  - Density: 186.2/km^{2} (482.2/sq mi)

Languages
  - Official: Malayalam, English
  - Regional: Malayalam, Tamil
- Time zone: UTC+5:30 (IST)
- Postal code: 685619
- Vehicle registration: KL-69

Santhanpara is a village in Idukki district in the Indian state of Kerala.

== Demographics ==
As of 2011 Census, Santhanpara had a population of 6,782 with 3,357 males and 3,425 females. Santhanpara village has an area of 36.43 km^{2} (14.07 sq mi) with 1,985 families residing in it. In Santhanpara, 8.4% of the population was under 6 years of age. Santhanpara had an average literacy of 81.8% higher than the national average of 74% and lower than state average of 94%.
