= Pampadumpara =

- village
- Location within Kerala Location within India
- Coordinates: 9°47′48.188″N 77°9′33.421″E
- Country: India
- State: Kerala
- District: Idukki

Area
  - Total: 36.19 km^{2} (13.97 sq mi)

Population (2011)
  - Total: 17,336
  - Density: 479.0/km^{2} (1,241/sq mi)

Languages
  - Official: Malayalam, English
  - Regional: Malayalam, Tamil
- Time zone: UTC+5:30 (IST)
- Postal code: 685553
- Vehicle registration: KL 69

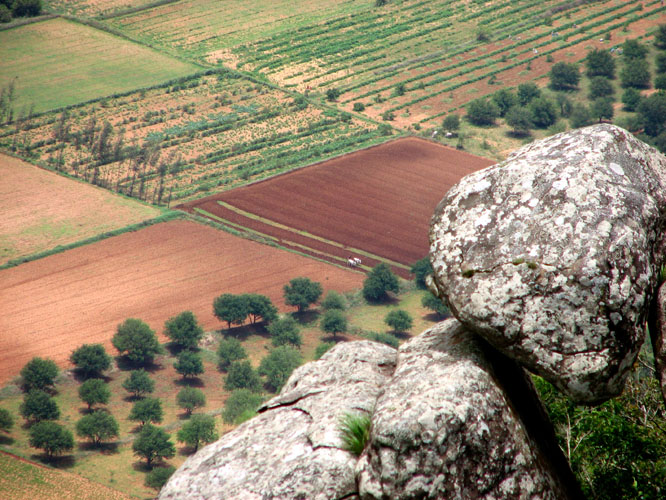
View of Tamil Nadu from Pamadupara

Pampadumpara is a village in Idukki district in the Indian state of Kerala. Cardamom Research Institute is located in Pampadumpara.

== Demographics ==
As of 2011 India census, Pampadumpara had a population of 17336 with 8570 males and 8766 females. The population includes people from Kerala as well as the neighboring state Tamil Nadu.

== Etymology ==
The origin of the city's name is steeped in natural specialties of this area. The name Pampadumpara is composed of three local language words. That are Pamp means Snake, Aadum means Dance and Para means Rock. As a whole the meaning of the name Pampadumpara is snakes dancing rock. Legend says in this area there were many snakes who danced atop the rocks and thus the name becomes Pampadumpara. It is believed that a lot of tribes were once lived here, and they gave this name.

== Ethnic Groups and Communities ==
The Pampadumpara has people of three religions – Hindu, Christian and Muslim. Along with native and migrated Keralites, there are many people of Tamil origin as well. Most of the people are either migrants from southern states of Kerala, especially Kottayam, Pathanamthitta, Alappuzha and Kollam.

== Geography and Economy ==
Pampadumpara is a hilly area with plantations of cardamom, pepper, coffee, tea, ginger, and other crops. The economy of this area is derived from its geographical features. Cardamom is cultivated in more than 60% of the total area. Residents of the village have begun offering short-term home stays to tourists. The climate is usually cold, with temperatures varying from 16 °C to 30 °C.

== Transport ==
Road transportation is only available mode of transportation. The nearest airports are Nedumbassery Airport, Kochi and Madurai Airport Tamil Nadu. Nearest railway stations are Kottayam and Aluva.

== Education ==
Pampadumpara is a 100% literate village. The present trend of education in this area is at least the school completion of +2. Also there are people who completed their Masters considers agriculture as the best means of wealth and taking care of the plantations. The village is found on the way from Thekkady to Munnar so many tourist are passing this way.
