= Udumbanchola =

- Village/Taluk
- Location in Kerala, India Udumbanchola (India)
- Coordinates: 9.899356°N 77.18148°E
- Country: India
- State: Kerala
- District: Idukki

Government
  - Type: Taluk
  - Body: Udumbanchola Grama Panchayat

Area
  - Village: 31.79 km^{2} (12.27 sq mi)
  - Taluk: 656.66 km^{2} (253.54 sq mi)

Population (2011)
  - Village: 10,064
  - Taluk: 283,369

Languages
  - Official: Malayalam, English
  - Minority: Tamil
- Time zone: UTC+5:30 (IST)
- Postal code: 685554
- Vehicle registration: KL-69

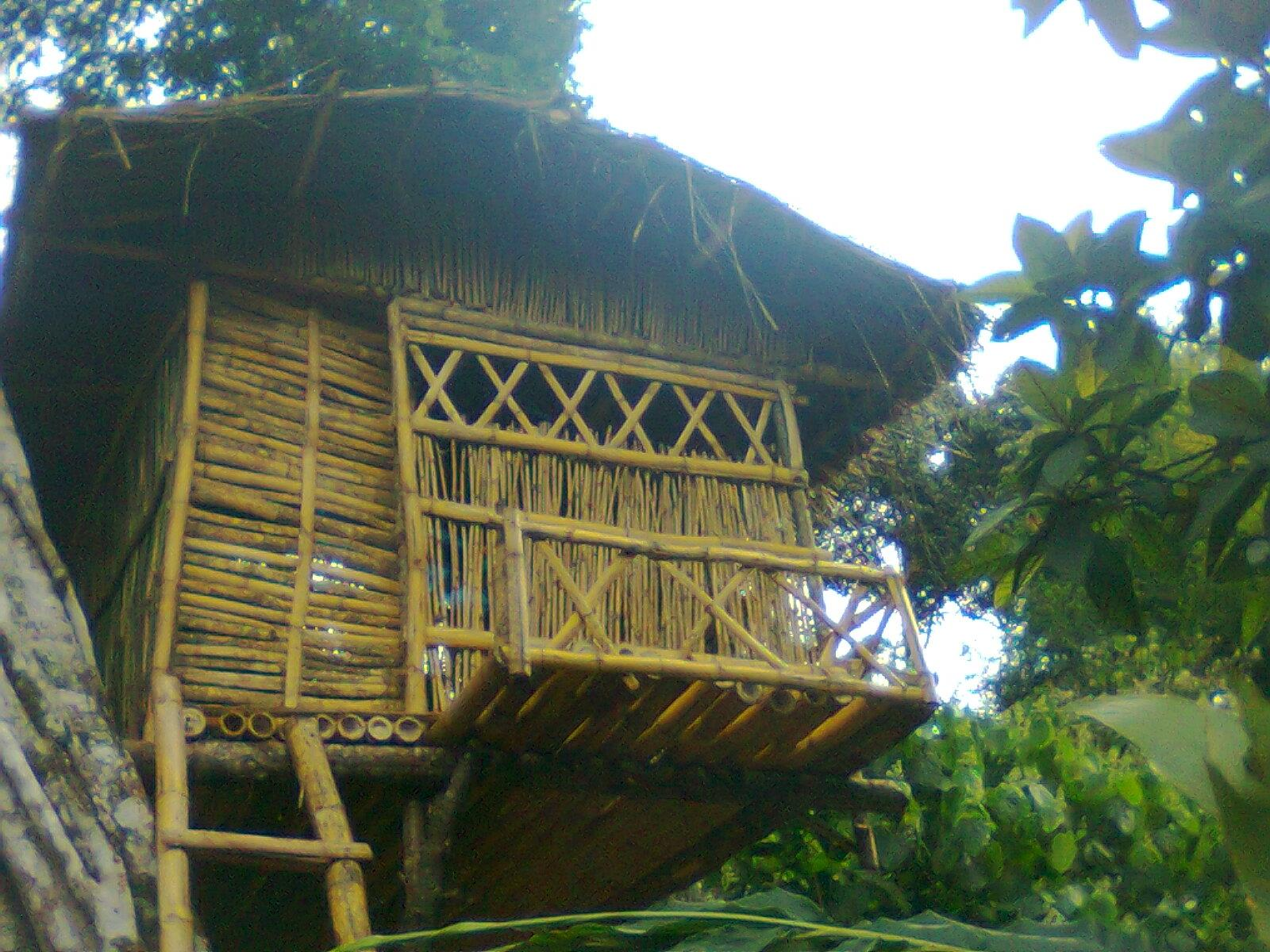
Tree house at Udumbanchola

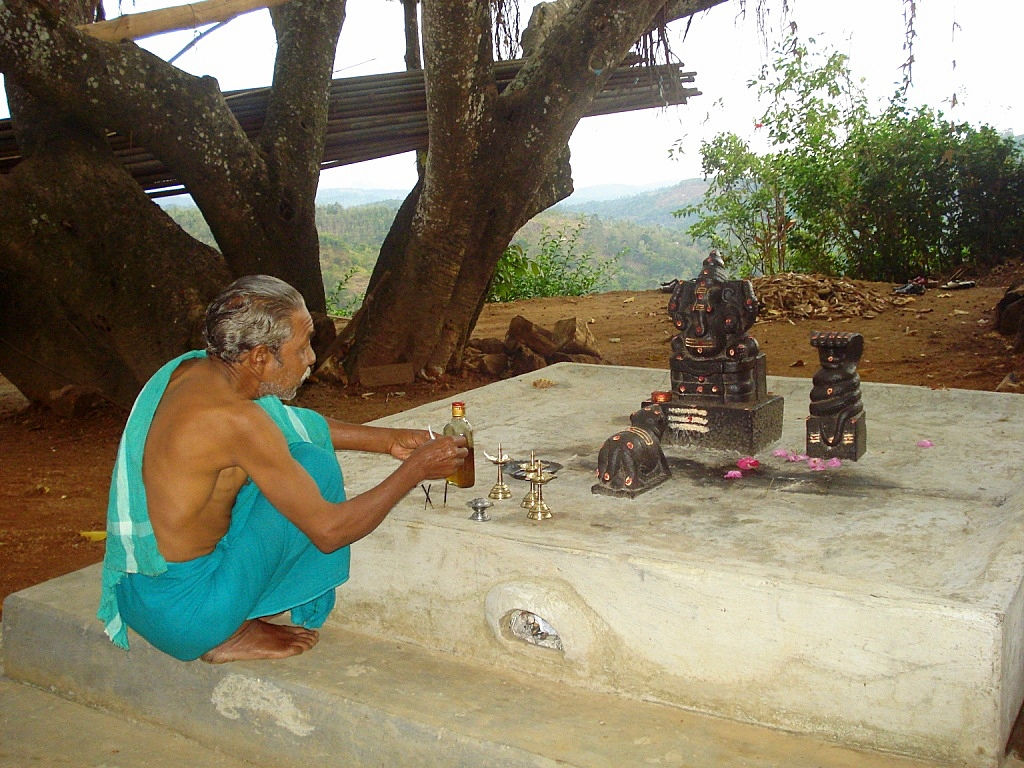
Tribal Temple at Rajakumari

Udumbanchola is a taluk in Idukki district of the Indian state of Kerala. This is in the high ranges. Nedumkandam is the major town and capital of Udumbanchola taluk. Mathikettan Shola National Park is located in Udumbanchola.

In July 2019, a team of historians found new menhir, perhaps the largest-ever recorded in Kerala, on the Pothamala hills in Udumbanchola taluk on the Kerala-Tamil Nadu border. According to them, Pothamala hills housed hundreds of cobbled stone structures, pointing to the existence of a structured graveyard of a prehistoric civilization.

== Politics ==
Udumbanchola Assembly constituency is part of Idukki Lok Sabha constituency. Nedumkandam, Thookkupalam, K.Chappathu, Upputhara, Anakkara are the townships in Udumbumchola Taluk.

== Demographics ==
As of 2011 census, Udumbanchola village had a population of 10,064 with 5,100 males and 4,964 females. Udumbanchola village spreads over an area of 31.79 km^{2} (12.27 sq mi) with 2,796 families residing in it. The average sex ratio was 982 lower than the state average of 1084. In Udumbanchola, 9.6% of the population was under 6 years of age. Udumbanchola had an average literacy of 81.6% lower than the state average of 94%; male literacy was 85% and female literacy was 78%.

== Administration ==
Udumbanchola taluk has administration over 18 revenue villages. Nedumkandam is the taluk headquarters. In 2013, separate Idukki taluk was carved out from Udumbanchola and Thodupuzha taluks for the ease of administration. The constituent villages in Udumbanchola taluk are:

- Anakkara, Anavilasam, Bisonvalley, Chakkupallam, Chathurangappara,
- Chinnakanal, Erattayar, Kalkoonthal, Kanthippara, Karunapuram,
- Pampadumpara, Parathode, Poopara, Rajakkad,
- Rajakumari, Santhanpara, Udumbanchola and Vandanmedu

== See also ==
- Udumbanchola Vision, a Malayalam movie set and shot in Udumbanchola
- Kalkoonthal
- Moongapara
- Pachady
- Pottankad
- Upputhode
