= Idukki Wildlife Sanctuary =

Wildlife sanctuary in Idukki district

Idukki Wildlife sanctuary
- IUCN category IV (habitat/species management area)
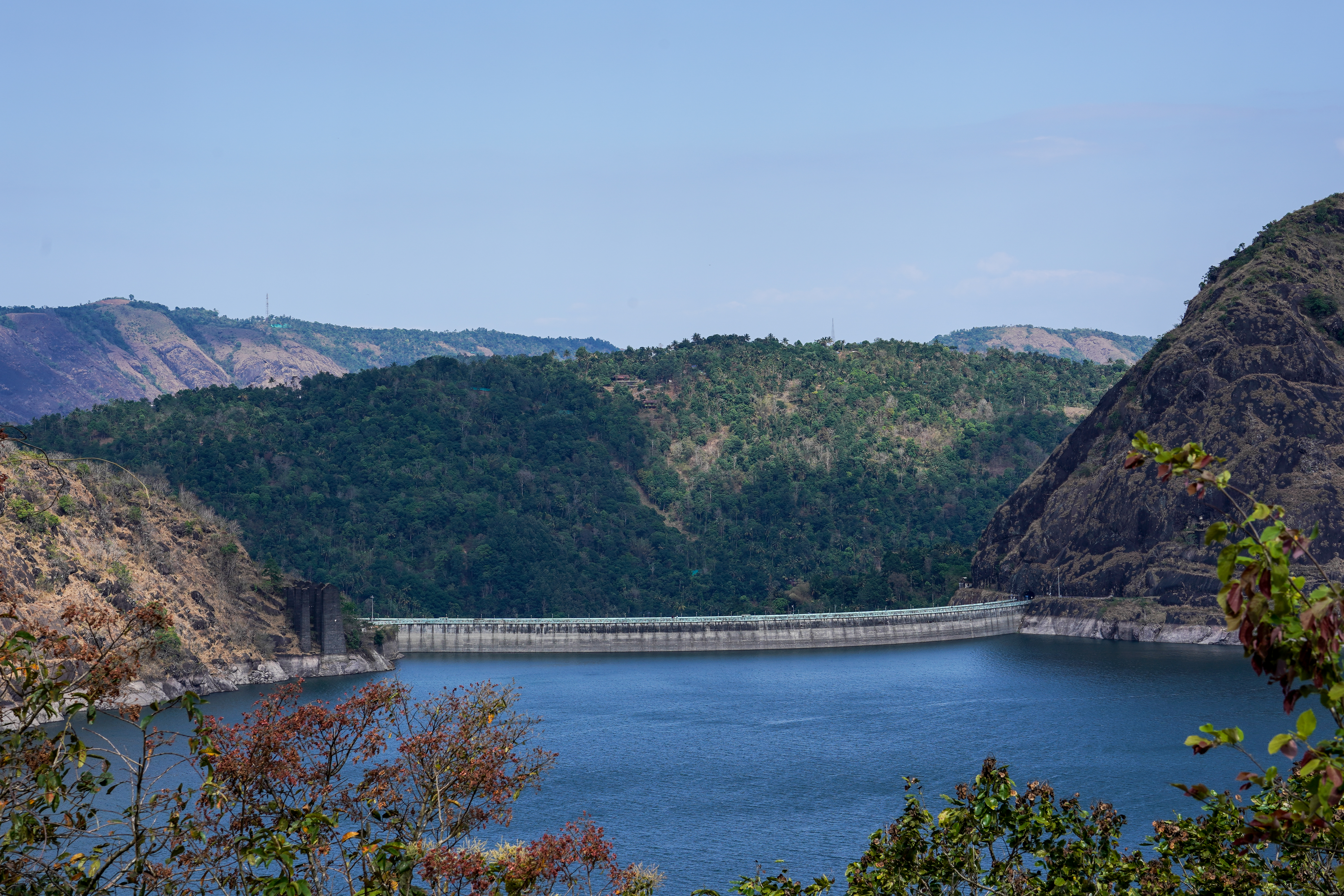

- Location within Kerala Location within India
- Interactive map of Idukki Wildlife sanctuary
- Location: Idukki district, Kerala, India
- Coordinates: 9°46′50″N 76°58′00″E
- Area: 70 km^{2} (27.0 sq mi)
- Established: 1976
- Governing body: Department of forests, Government of Kerala

Idukki Wildlife Sanctuary is Wildlife Sanctuary located in Idukki district of Kerala, India. Situated around the catchment area of Idukki Dam, the Idukki Wildlife Sanctuary is rich in biodiversity and rich flora and fauna.

== Description ==
Idukki Wildlife Sanctuary is a forest area around the catchment area of Idukki Dam (Idukki Reservoir). The clearing of hectares of rainforest for the Idukki hydropower project has caused significant damage to the wildlife there. In view of this, it was decided to protect the surrounding area. Idukki Wildlife Sanctuary is spread over Thodupuzha, and Udumbanchola taluks. The sanctuary covers an area of 105.364 km^{2} (40.7 sq mi), out of which 72 km^{2} (27.8 sq mi) is forest land and 33 km^{2} (12.7 sq mi) is water body of reservoir. The place was declared a wildlife sanctuary on 9 February 1976, as per government order numbered GO.7898/FM3/76/AD/09.02.76. The sanctuary is located at an elevation of 450 to 1272 meters above sea level. The highest peak in the sanctuary is Vanjur Medu which has a height of 1,272 m (4,173.2 ft).

The Idukki, Cheruthoni and Kulamavu dams are located in this sanctuary. The Wildlife Sanctuary Warden is headquartered at Vellapara near Pinea. The nature study camps of the forest department are held here regularly. The district headquarters of Idukki, Painavu is located within the sanctuary.

== Weather and Temperature ==
The average temperature in the sanctuary varies from 15°C to 25°C, with the hottest months being March and April.

== Flora and fauna ==
The tree species found in Idukki wildlife sanctuary include ceylon ironwood, thampakam (Hopea parviflora), large-flowered bay tree, wild jack (Artocarpus hirsutus), pali (Palaquium ellipticum), malampunna (Calophyllum polyanthum), Vernonia arborea, karuva (Cinnamomum verum), teak, Indian rosewood, vella maruthu (Terminalia paniculata), Grewia tiliifolia and Malabar kino.

Common animals found in the sanctuary include asian elephants, deer species like Sambar deer, Muntjac, Chevrotain, monkeys including Bonnet macaque and Nilgiri langur, squirrels including Indian giant squirrel, Wild dog, Wild boar, jungle cat, dhole and Jackal. The sanctuary is also home to a large number of domestic animals including bulls, cows and buffaloes. They were trapped inside the wildlife sanctuary with the construction of the Idukki Dam in 1976. Since the predator species are less here, the increased number of livestock is said to pose a threat to the wildlife listed under the Idukki Wildlife (Conservation) Act, 1972 as it reduces the amount of grass.

The wildlife sanctuary is home to a number of birds including Greater Indian Hornbill, Heart-spotted woodpecker, Blue-bearded bee-eater, Malabar trogon, Black bulbul, Junglefowl, Laughingthrushes, Kingfisher and Peafowl. The bird-butterfly survey conducted at the Idukki Wildlife Sanctuary in 2017 found many rare birds and butterflies. The survey was conducted by the Kerala Forest Department in collaboration with Warblers and Waders, a consortium of bird and nature lovers. 163 species of birds and 107 species of butterflies were found in the survey.

An increase in the number of butterfly species was reported in a survey conducted in the sanctuary in 2019. The survey on butterflies, birds, tortoises and ants was conducted by the Kerala Forest and Wildlife Department and the Travancore Natural History Society. The management plan prepared 10 years ago recorded only 76 butterfly species, 2019 survey recorded 182 species. The survey found butterflies including Papilio buddha, the state butterfly of Kerala, Southern Birdwing, the largest butterfly in India, The Golden tree flitter, the Painted Lady, migrating from Eurasia, the Malabar tree nymph, Common fivering, Common bush hopper, Yamfly and Common Nawab.

== Vairamani ==
Vairamani is an islet formed in the Idukki Reservoir within the Idukki Wildlife Sanctuary during summers. This islet, without human intervention, is being turned into a breeding ground for many birds in the summer months. Currently, the islet is accessible only by boat controlled by the Forest Department. The Vairamani village was submerged in water in 1974 when the reservoir of the Idukki Dam was filled with water.
