= Vadakkepuzha Weir =

Diversion dam in Kerala, India

Vadakkepuzha Weir (Malayalam:വടക്കേപ്പുഴ തടയണ) is a diversion dam of Earthen type constructed across Vadakkepuzha which is a tributary of Muvattupuzha river in Arakkulam village in Idukki district of Kerala, India. Vadakkepuzha weir is a part of an augmentation scheme for the Idukki Hydro Electric Project. Narakakkanam, Azhutha, Vazhikkadavu, Vadakkepuzha and Kuttiar diversion schemes were later added to Idukki HEP to augment the reservoir. Water from the reservoir is pumped in to Idukki reservoir through a pump house with three pumps.

== Specifications ==
- Location Latitude : 9⁰ 47′ 00 ” N
- Longitude: 76⁰ 51′ E
- Panchayath : Arakkulam
- Village : Arakkulam
- District : Idukki
- River Basin : Periyar
- River: Vadakkepuzha
- Release from Dam to river : Malankara reservoir
- Taluk through which release flows : Thodupuzha
- Year of completion : 2003
- Name of Project: Idukki HEP
- Purpose of Project Hydro Power
- Type of Dam : Earthen- bund
- Classification : Weir
- Maximum Water Level (MWL) : EL 724.00 m
- Full Reservoir Level ( FRL) : EL 723.25 m
- Storage at FRL; 0.0667 Mm3
- Height from deepest foundation : 2.80m ( Height from bed level)
- Length
- Spillway : Ungated – Overflow section
- Crest Level NA
- River Outlet Not provided
- Officers in charge & phone No. Assistant Executive Engineer, Idukki Augmentation Scheme, Moolamattom. Phone-9496009429
- Installed capacity of the Project; 780 MW
