= Kulamavu Dam =

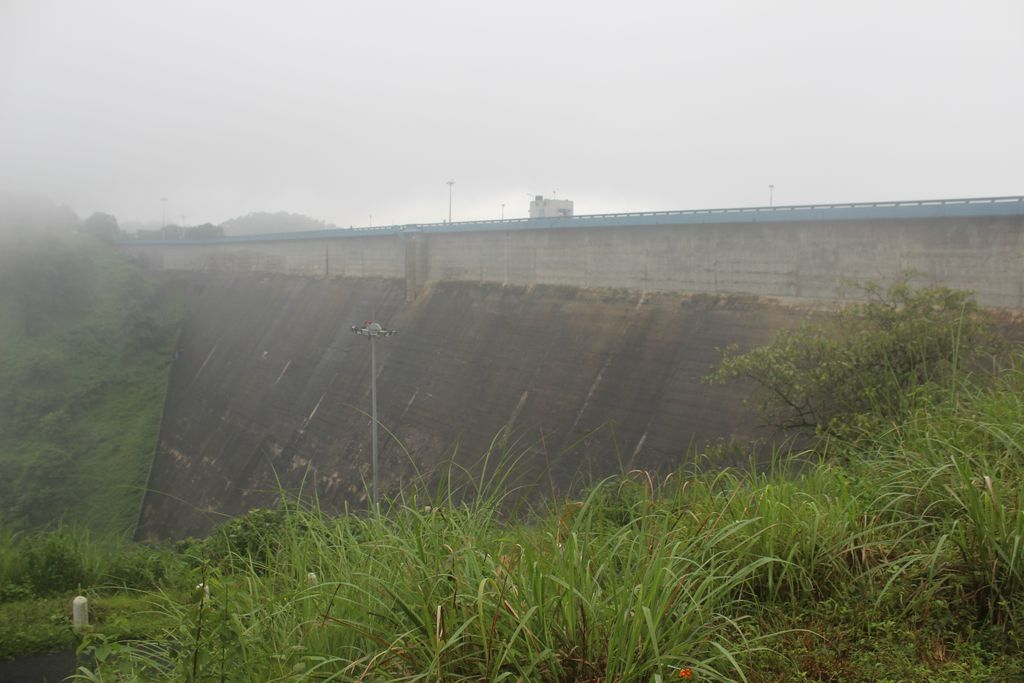
- Kulamavu dam

- Location in Kerala Kulamavu Dam (India)
- Country: India
- Location: Kulamavu, Idukki, Kerala
- Coordinates: 9°48′10.59″N 76°53′46″E
- Purpose: Hydroelectric
- Status: Operational
- Construction began: 30 April 1969
- Opening date: February 1977
- Owner: Kerala State Electricity Board

Dam and spillways
- Type of dam: Gravity, masonry
- Impounds: Muvattupuzha River
- Height (foundation): 100 m (328 ft)
- Length: 385 m (1,263 ft)
- Width (crest): 220 ft (67 m)
- Dam volume: 620,300 m^{3} (811,300 cu yd)
- Spillway type: UG
- Spillway capacity: 1,600 m^{3}/s (57,000 cu ft/s)

Reservoir
- Catchment area: 38 km^{2}
- Normal elevation: 2,500 ft (760 m)

Power Station
- Turbines: 6 x 130 MW Pelton-type
- Installed capacity: 780 MW

Kulamavu Dam is a gravity/masonry dam on Kilivillithode, which is a tributary of the Periyar river in Arakkulam village, Idukki district in the Indian state of Kerala. It is one of three dams associated with the Idukki hydroelectric power project in the Indian state of Kerala. This dam is located towards the western side of the Idukki Arch Dam. This is a gravity dam with the top portion in concrete and the bottom in masonry.

The dam is situated on the Thodupuzha - Puliyanmala state highway (SH-33), about 23 km (14 mi) from Idukki arch dam, 22 km (14 mi) from Cheruthoni dam and 38 km (24 mi) from Thodupuzha. Preliminary work on the dam was initiated under the leadership of Superintending Engineer, E.U. Philipose. The dam was completed in the year 1977 and is operated and maintained by Kerala State Electricity Board.

The dams of Idukki, Cheruthoni and Kulamavu extend to an area of 33 km^{2}. The construction of these three dams formed a 60 km^{2} artificial lake. The water stored in it is used for the production of electricity at the power house in Moolamattom. Taluks through which release flow are Thodupuzha, Udupanchola, Devikulam, Kothamangalam, Muvattupuzha, Kunnathunadu, Aluva, Kodungalloor and Paravur.

== Specifications ==
- Type of Dam :Masonry & Concrete Gravity
- Classification : VH (Very High Dam )
- Panchayath : Arakkulam
- Village : idukki
- District : Idukki
- River Basin : Periyar
- River : Kilivallithodu
- Release from Dam to river : Kilivallithodu
- Length of Dam (m) : 385
- Max Height above Foundation (m) :100
- Total Volume Content of Dam (TCM) :453.13

Gross storage capacity: 1.996 cubic Kms (70.50 tmc ft) Active storage capacity: 1.46 cubic kms (51.56 tmc ft)

- Design Flood (cumec) :8014
- Maximum Water Level (MWL) : EL 2408.50 ft. ( 734.30 m)
- Full Reservoir Level ( FRL) : EL 2403.00 ft. ( 732.62 m)
- Storage at FRL : 1996.30Mm3
- Spillway : No spillway
Dams in Periyar

== Reservoir ==
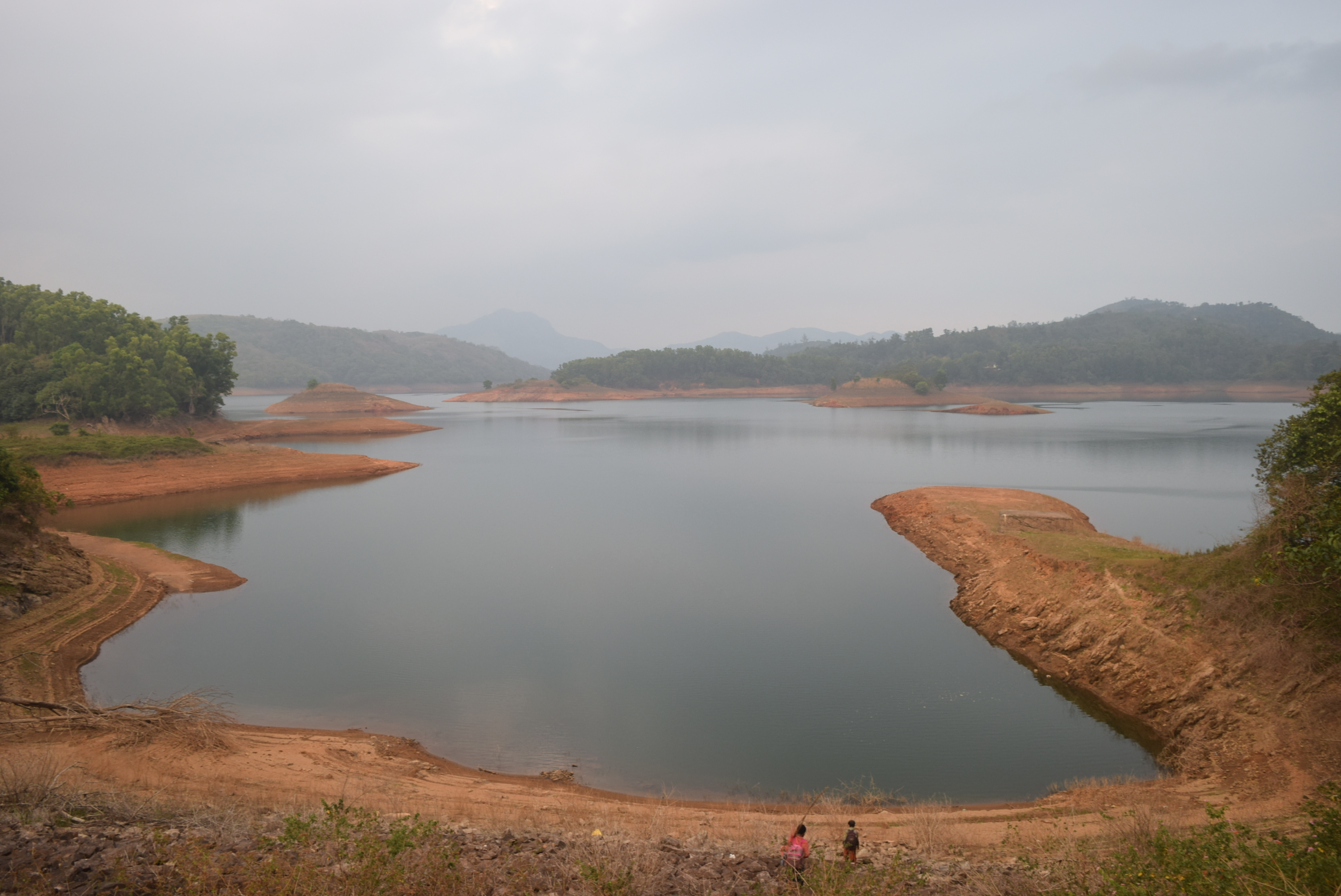
Kulamavu reservoir

== Hydroelectric project ==
This Underground Power Station is supposedly a technological achievement. There are six generating units each of 130 MW, capacity. There are seven 220kV feeders for transmitting the power to the load centers. The power generated in the powerhouse is taken to the switchyard through 220 KV oil-filled-cables. After power generation, water from the power station is released to the Thodupuzha River through an underground tunnel, which is 1,220 meters in length. This tail race water is in turn, used for producing electricity in the Malankara Small Hydro Electric Station and also for irrigation by means of the Irrigation dam at Malankara.

== See also ==
- Cheruthoni Dam
- Idukki Dam
- List of reservoirs and dams in India
- Moolamattom Power Station
- Telefilm about Idukki Dam
