= Moolamattom hydro power station =

Moolamattam hydro power station
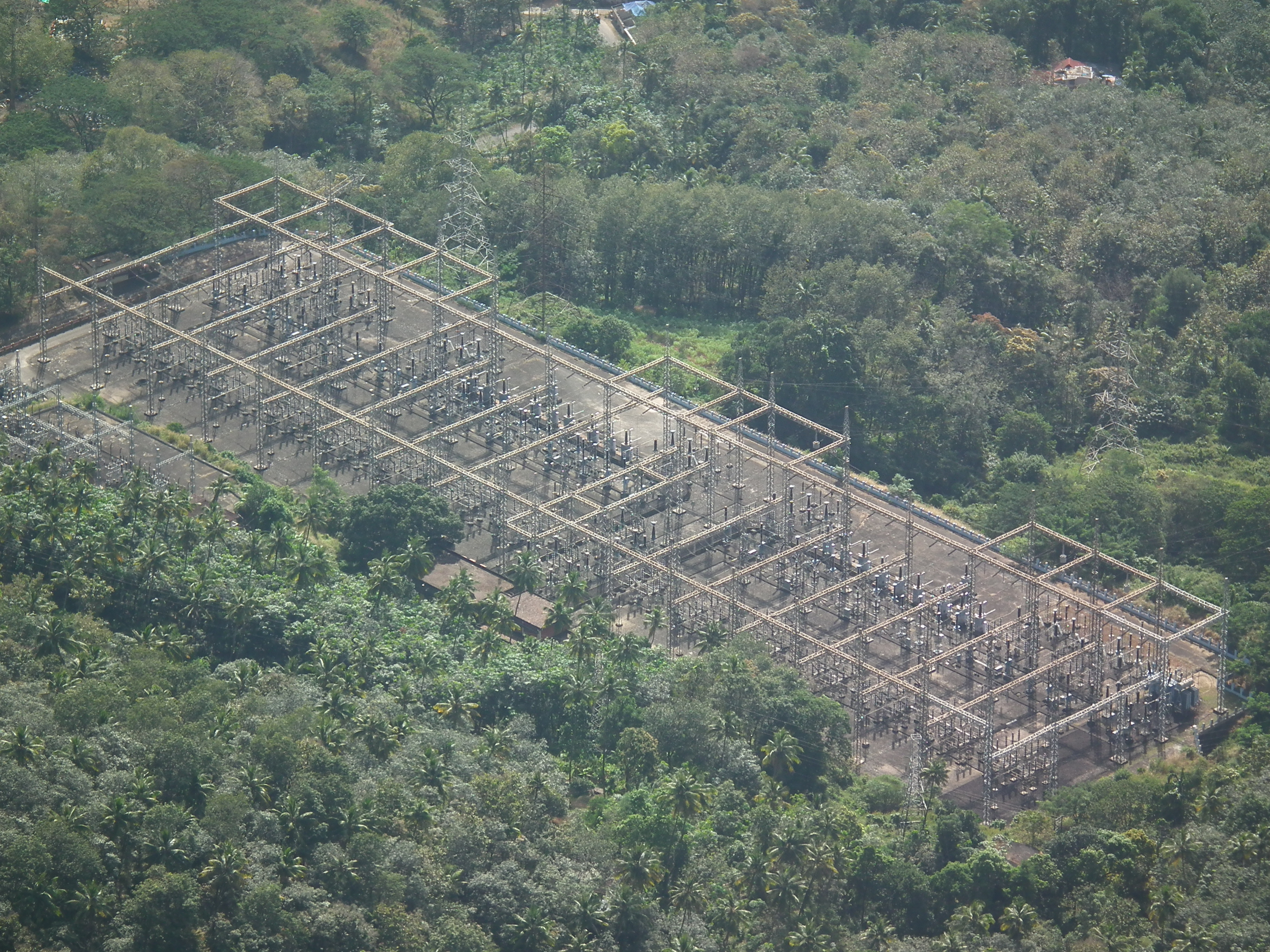
- Moolamattom power house Switch yard view and area 5861
- Interactive map of Moolamattam hydro power station
- Country: India
- Coordinates: 9.7887°N 76.8598°E
- Purpose: Hydroelectric
- Status: Completed
- Owner: Kerala State Electricity Board

Power Station
- Type: Hydro Power Plant
- Installed capacity: 780 MW
- Website; Kerala State Electricity Board

The Moolamattom hydro power station is the power house of the Kerala State Electricity Board's Idukki Hydroelectric Project, the largest hydroelectric project in Kerala, India, with a capacity to generate 2398 gigawatt-hours of electricity annually. Located on the banks of Muvattupuzha River at Moolamattam in Arakulam Gram Panchayat of Thodupuzha Taluk of Idukki district, it is one of the largest underground hydroelectric power stations in India. The power house has an installed capacity of 780 MW. In the three dams of this hydroelectric project, the water needed to generate electricity at the Moolamattam power station is pumped through tunnels (penstock pipes) near the pond level.

The water discharged from the power station reaches the Thodupuzha River (a tributary of Muvattupuzha river) which becomes full of water throughout the year due to this. The power house is located underground in the foothills of Nadukani hill, at a distance of 46 km from the Idukki dam.

== See also ==
- Pallivasal Hydro Electric Project
