= Humboldtia ponmudiana =

Scientific classification
- Kingdom: Plantae
- Clade: Tracheophytes
- Clade: Angiosperms
- Clade: Eudicots
- Clade: Rosids
- Order: Fabales
- Family: Fabaceae
- Genus: Humboldtia
- Species: H. ponmudiana

Binomial name
- Humboldtia ponmudiana E.S.S.Kumar, Shareef & Raj Vikr.

Species of tree

Humboldtia ponmudiana is a species of plant endemic to Kerala in India.

== Etymology ==
This species was named for Ponmudi Hills, a hill station in Kerala where the tree was found and described. The leaves are of sub-sessile with 8-12 in numbers.

== Description ==
This tree can be between 5 and 12 meters high. The trunk has a 25–50 cm diameter and the bark is black. The flowers are white and cauliflorus where they grows directly on the stem or old branches. The seed pods are oblong and silky and hairy with 2–3 seeds inside. The flowering and fruiting season is from December to February.

This species resembles Humboldtia decurrens but can be differentiated by the black bark, young shoots being densely hairy and dark brown, sessile flowers, oval-shaped bracts without glands, hairy and long-beaked shaped seed pods amongst other characteristics.

== Distribution ==
This species of trees were known only from the evergreen forests of Ponmudi and found at an elevation of 700–800 meters.

== Threats and conservation ==
At the time of discovery of this species in 2002, a single population of 50 mature trees were found in less than 5 km^{2} area. Hence it was suggested to be categorized as Critically Endangered.
