= Narakakkanam Weir =

Diversion dam in Kerala, India

Narakakkanam Weir (Malayalam:നാരകക്കാനം തടയണ) is a diversion dam constructed across Narakakkanam River in Mariyapuram panchayath of Thankamani Village in Idukki district in Kerala, India. Narakakkanam weir is an augmentation weir for the Idukki Hydro Electric Project . Narakakkanam, Azhutha, Vazhikkadavu, Vadakkepuzha and Kuttiar diversion schemes were later added to augment the Idukki reservoir . The height of the dam is 11.50 metres (37.7 ft) from the deepest foundation and length is 45.20 metres (148.3 ft).

== Specifications ==
- Location Latitude : 9⁰ 50′ N
- Longitude: 77⁰ 00′ E
- Panchayath : Mariyapuram
- Village: Thankamani
- District : Idukki
- River Basin : Periyar
- River : Narakakkanam river
- Release from Dam to river : Periyar
- Taluk through which release flows : Thodupuzha
- Year of completion :
- Name of Project : Idukki HEP
- Purpose of Project : Hydro Power
- Installed capacity of the Project 780 MW
- Type of Dam : Concrete- Gravity
- Classification; Weir
- Maximum Water Level (MWL) : EL 770.00 m
- Full Reservoir Level ( FRL): EL 768.00 m
- Storage at FRL 0.00396 Mm3
- Height from deepest foundation : 11.50 m
- Length : 45.20 m
- Spillway : Ungated – Overflow section
- Crest Level : EL 768.00 m
- River Outlet : Not provided
- Officers in charge & phone No. Assistant Executive Engineer, Idukki Augmentation Scheme, Moolamattom. Phone-9496009429
