= Idukki Dam =

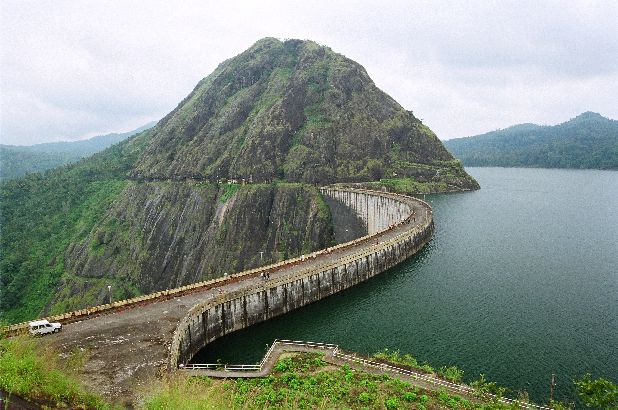

- Location within Kerala
- Country: India
- Location: Idukki, Kerala
- Coordinates: 9°50′34″N 76°58′34″E
- Purpose: Power generation
- Status: Operational
- Construction began: 1963
- Opening date: 1976 (50 years ago)
- Owner: Kerala State Electricity Board

Dam and spillways
- Type of dam: Concrete, double curvature parabolic, thin arch.
- Impounds: Periyar River
- Height: 168.91 m (554 ft)
- Height (foundation): 169.16 meters
- Length: 365.85 m (1,200 ft)
- Dam volume: 450,000 m^{3} (16,000,000 cu ft)
- Spillways: Nil

Reservoir
- Total capacity: 1.996 km^{3} (70.5 tmc ft)
- Active capacity: 1,460×10^{6} m^{3} (1,183,641 acre⋅ft) (51.57 tmc ft)
- Inactive capacity: 536×10^{6} m^{3} (434,542 acre⋅ft) (18.93 tmc ft)
- Catchment area: 649.3 km^{2} (251 mi^{2})
- Surface area: 60 km^{2} (23 mi^{2})
- Normal elevation: 732.62 m (2,404 ft)

Power Station
- Commission date: 1975
- Turbines: 6 x 130 MW Pelton-type
- Installed capacity: 780 MW

The Idukki Dam is a double-curvature thin arch dam constructed across the Periyar River in a narrow gorge between two granite hills locally known as Kuravan and Kurathi, in the Idukki district, in the state of Kerala, India. It is constructed and owned by the Kerala State Electricity Board. It supports a 780 MW hydroelectric power station in Moolamattom, which started generating power on 4 October 1975. At 168.91 metres (554.2 ft), it is one of the highest arch dams in Asia. The Indo-Canadian project was inaugurated by Prime Minister Indira Gandhi on February 17, 1976.

This dam was constructed along with two other dams at Cheruthoni and Kulamavu. Together, the three dams and two saddle dams, Kulamavu Saddle Dam (Near Junction) and Kulamavu Saddle Dam (Right Bank) have created an artificial lake that is 60 km^{2} (23 sq mi) in area. The stored water is used to produce electricity at the Moolamattom Powerhouse, which is located inside nearby rocky caves.

Narakakkanam, Azhutha, Vazhikkadavu, Vadakkepuzha and Kuttiar diversion schemes were later added to augment the Idukki reservoir.

== History ==
=== Early surveys ===
The idea of constructing a dam for power generation was first conceived in 1919 in a report submitted by Italian engineer Jacob to the Travancore government, which was rejected. As per history, Shri Chemban Karuvellayan Kolumban, the head of the 'Oorali' tribe during 1922, showed the way to the Malankara Estate Superintendent W.J.John and his friend AC Thomas Edattu were on a hunting trip to forests near the present Arch Dam. Upon hearing the legend of Kuravan and Kurathi Hills, Thomas was impressed by the sight of water flow between the mountains and suggested the spot be suitable for an Arch dam. In 1932, W.J. John submitted a report to the Government of Travancore on the possibility of constructing a dam at Idukki for Power Generation. In 1935, assembly member Shri.K.A.Narayana Pillai brought the Idukki project to the attention of the Government of Travancore. Italian engineers Angelo Omedayo and Clantheyo Masele conducted a study in 1937, but things didn't go forward. In 1947, a preliminary investigation report was prepared and submitted by Sri. P. Joseph John, then the Chief Electrical Engineer to the Government of Travancore. It was during 1956 that the Central Water Commission conducted a detailed investigation based on the government's request. The project report was prepared in 1961, and the Planning Commission accorded sanction for implementing the scheme in 1963. In 1964, under the leadership of Sri. E.U. Philipose, Superintending Engineer, preliminary works of the project were started.

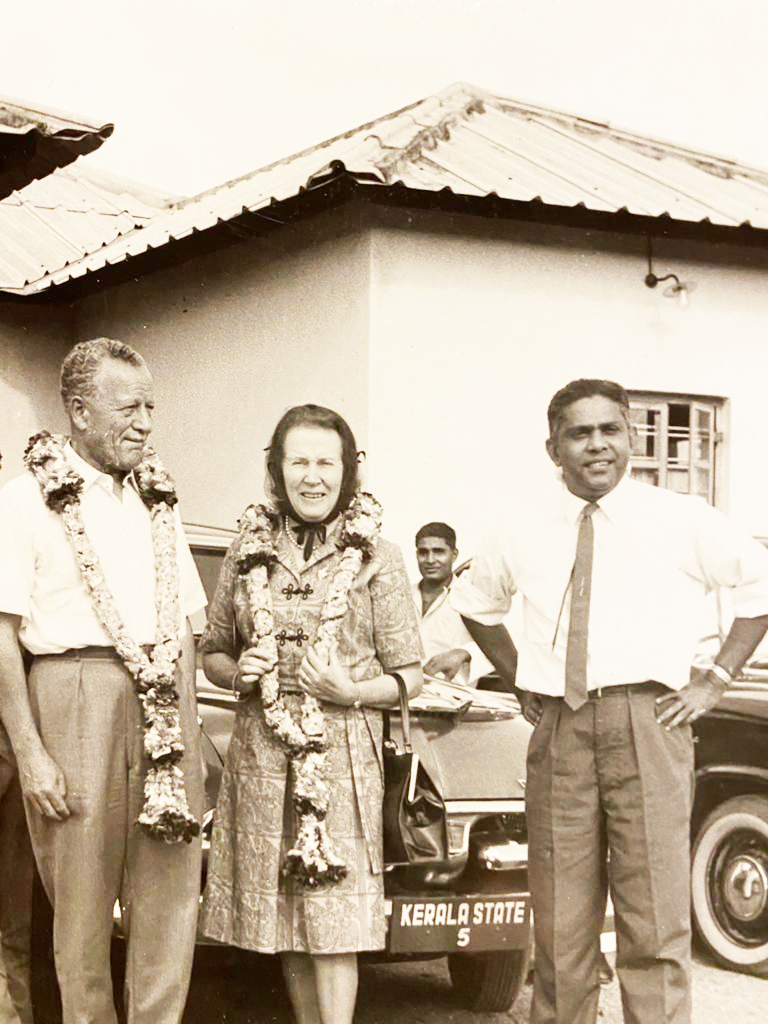
E.U. Philipose, Superintending Engineer, Kerala State Electricity Board, in charge of the initial project work, with visiting Canadian Government dignitary, Mr and Mrs Fred Willows.

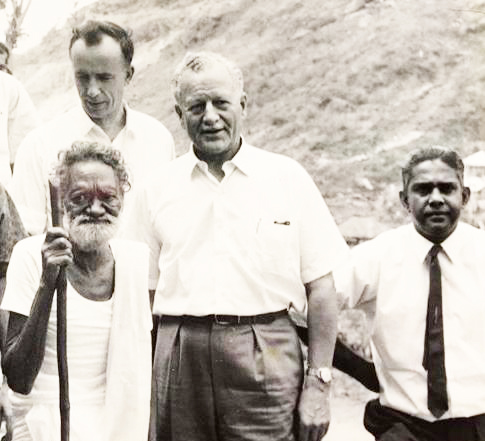
Tribal Chief, Chemban Vellayan Kolumban who pointed out Idukki arch dam site with Canadian Government dignitary Fred Willows

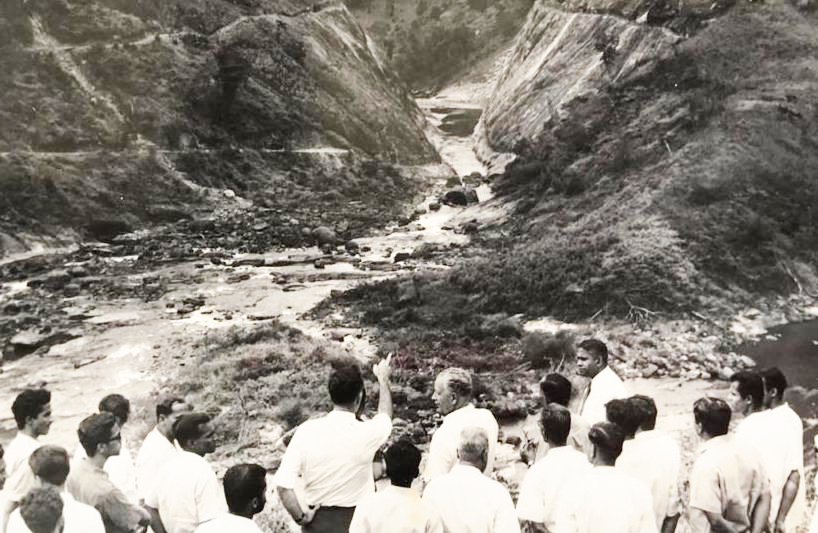
Idukki Arch Dam Site prior to construction

=== Construction ===
The construction of this dam commenced on 30 April 1969. The project led by Dr.D.Babu Paul IAS, who was appointed as Project Coordinator, Idukki Hydel Project & District Collector, with several engineers like Sri. C.V Mathews and Sri. M. Ramachandran, (Retired Chief Engineer, Kerala State Electricity Board). The Government of Canada aided the project with long-term loans and grants. SNC-Lavalin, Canada, a well-known firm of consulting engineers, was advising and assisting project engineers under Canadian aid, Hindustan Construction Company (a.k.a. HCC) of Walchand group won the bid for construction. Storage of water in Idukki reservoir commenced in February 1973. The inauguration of the trial run of the first machine was celebrated on 4 October 1975. Commercial operation of the Power Station was commissioned on 12 February 1976 by the then Prime Minister Smt. Indira Gandhi.

=== 2018 floods ===
Since the Idukki Reservoir's commissioning in 1976, its floodgates located at the adjoining Cheruthoni Dam — had been opened only twice before, in October 1981 and October 1992, both times during the northeast monsoon. In the 2018 Kerala floods, unprecedented rainfall during the southwest monsoon caused the reservoir's live storage to fill to unusually high levels well ahead of schedule, forcing authorities to release water from the reservoir for the first time during a southwest monsoon. On 9 August 2018, the first shutter of the Cheruthoni Dam was opened, and within about 26 hours all five radial floodgates had been raised as the water level exceeded 2,400 ft, marking the first time in the dam's history that all five gates were opened simultaneously.

The controlled release from the Idukki Reservoir added to the flooding along the Periyar river, which was already swollen by record rainfall, and contributed to the evacuation of large numbers of people downstream, along with the state government facing criticism over the timing of the release. A subsequent analysis by the Central Water Commission found that the releases from the Idukki and adjoining Idamalayar reservoirs during the flood were controlled and remained well below the dams' maximum discharge capacities, and concluded that the dams had achieved a measure of flood moderation rather than worsening the flood. The floodgates remained open for about a month before being closed once water levels receded.

== Features ==
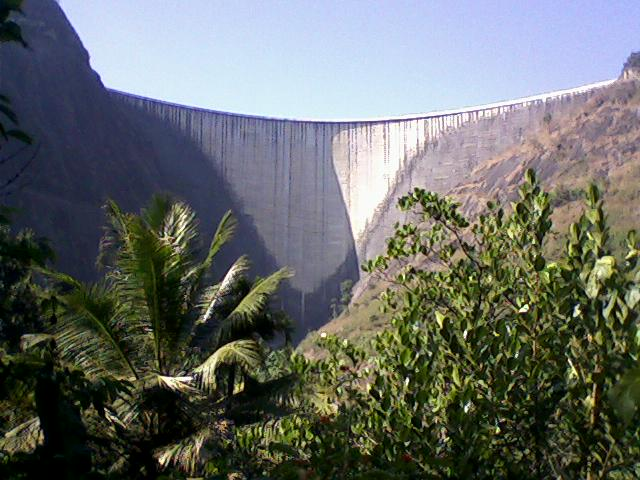
From below

The Idukki Dam is 168.91 m (554.2 ft) tall, constructed between two mountains, Kuravanmala (839 m (2,753 ft)) and Kurathimala (925 m (3,035 ft)). The length of the dam on its top is 365.85 m (1,200.3 ft). It has a width of 7.62 m (25.0 ft) at the top and 19.81 m (65.0 ft) at the bottom. The gross storage capacity of the dam is 1.996 cubic km (70.50 tmc ft). About 464,000 m^{3} (16,400,000 cu ft) of concrete was used in the construction of the dam. This project is situated in Idukki District and its underground power house is located at Moolamattom which is about 43 km (27 mi) from the dam. It is notable that the Idukki arch dam does not have any shutters. The reservoir water level is maintained by the shutters in the Cheruthoni dam.

== Usage ==
Dams in the Periyar basin

=== Power generation ===
The project harnesses a major portion of the power potential of Periyar, the largest river in Kerala, by the creation of a reservoir of 2,000 M.cum (2 Billion Tonnes) capacity, and diversion of waters thus impounded through a water conductor system consisting of a power tunnel and two underground pressure shafts to an underground powerhouse situated in Moolamattom. The installed capacity of the Power House is 780 MW consisting of 6 Units of Pelton-type turbines with a power generation capacity of 130 MW each. The regulated waters of Periyar falls through a drop of about 669.2 m (2,196 ft) while generating power in the underground power house. The generated power is given to two sub stations. One double circuit line to Kalamassery; one single circuit line to Tamil Nadu; one single circuit line to Pallom, 3 feeder bays for future.

=== Irrigation ===
The tail waters flowing to Kudayathurpuzha through tunnel and open channel is diverted for irrigation purposes in the Muvattupuzha Valley.

=== Tourism ===
Earlier, there was a blanket ban on public entry to the dam due to security reasons. Later, it was relaxed opening the dam for public for 10 days during the Onam and the Christmas seasons. The duration has been increased to one month since last year. Cameras and cell phones are not allowed inside the dam area. The entry fee is Rs. 25 for adults and Rs. 5 for children. The fee for 15-minute boating service for five persons is Rs. 600.

Idukki Valley is 121 km (75 mi) away from Kottayam and is a small hill town surrounded by a spread of beautiful, wooded valleys and meandering streams. Idukki is a well-known tourist center in Kerala.

The Idukki Wildlife Sanctuary extends over the Thodupuzha and Udumbanchola taluks of Idukki district, spread over 77 km (48 mi) and is about 450–748 m (1,476–2,454 ft) above sea level. The Idukki Reservoir, formed by three dams - Cheruthoni, Idukki and Kulamavu - extends to 33 km (21 mi). One can find elephants, bisons, sambar deer, wild dogs, jungle cats, tigers, wild boars, etc., and various snakes like cobras, vipers, kraits, and a number of non-venomous snakes. The birds of Idukki are jungle fowl, myna, laughing thrush, black bulbul, peafowl, woodpecker, kingfisher, eagle etc.

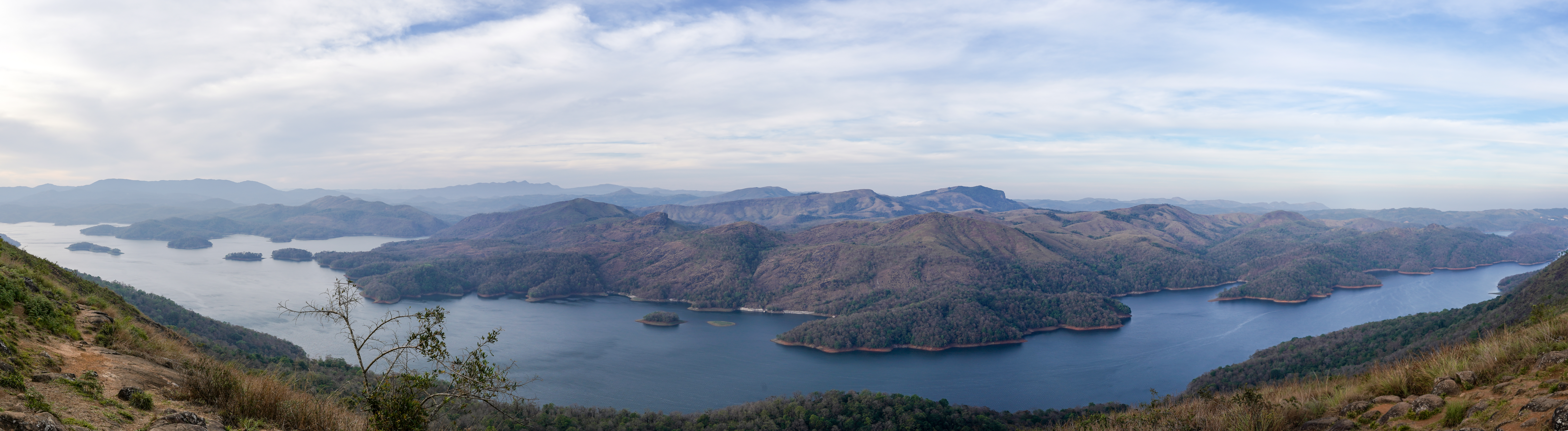
Idukki reservoir from Mount Calvary (dam beyond right edge)

== See also ==
- 2018 Kerala floods
- Kalvary Mount
- List of dams and reservoirs in Kerala
- Kulamavu Dam
- Cheruthoni Dam
- Kallar Dam
- Erattayar Dam
- Azhutha Dam
- Vazhikadavu Weir
- Vadakkepuzha Weir
- Kuttiar Weir
