= Kuttiar Weir =

Small diversion dam in Kerala, India

Kuttiar Weir (Malayalam: കുട്ടിയാർ തടയണ) is a small diversion dam constructed across Kuttiar River in Elappara panchayath of Vagamon Village of Idukki District in Kerala, India. The Kuttiar weir is constructed for augmenting water to the Idukki Hydro Electric Project. The weir has a height of 16.5 metres (54 ft) from the deepest foundation and a length of 101.35 metres (332.5 ft)

Narakakkanam, Azhutha, Vazhikkadavu, Vadakkepuzha and Kuttiar diversion schemes were later added to augment the Idukki reservoir. The Kuttiar diversion scheme envisages diversion of water from 10.4 km^{2} of catchment of Kuttiar ar to Idukki reservoir by constructing an unlined tunnel of 2697.3 m length and a weir of 101.30 m long for an additional 37 Mu power generation at Idukki Power station.

== Specifications ==
Latitude : 9⁰ 44′ N	Dam Features		
Longitude: 76⁰ 53′ E	Type of Dam	Concrete- Gravity	
Panchayath	Elappara	Classification	Weir
Village	Vagamon	Maximum Water Level (MWL)	EL 798.00 m
District	Idukki	Full Reservoir Level ( FRL)	EL 795.50 m
River Basin	Periyar	Storage at FRL	0.35 Mm3
River	Kuttiar river	Height from deepest foundation	16.50 m
Release from Dam to river	Thodupuzha ar	Length	101.35 m
Taluk through which release flows	Thodupuzha	Spillway	Ungated – Overflow section
Year of completion	2009	Crest Level	EL 795.50 m
Name of Project	Idukki HEP	River Outlet	1 No. Circular type, 0.75 m dia
Purpose of Project	Hydro Power		
