= Humboldtia nairiana =

Scientific classification
- Kingdom: Plantae
- Clade: Tracheophytes
- Clade: Angiosperms
- Clade: Eudicots
- Clade: Rosids
- Order: Fabales
- Family: Fabaceae
- Genus: Humboldtia
- Species: H. nairiana

Binomial name
- Humboldtia nairiana E.S.S.Kumar, S.M.Shareef & R.R.Vikraman

Species of flowering plant

Humboldtia nairiana is a rare species of flowering plant in the family Fabaceae, endemic to the Western Ghats of India. It is named in honor of the botanist Nair.

== Description ==
It is a small tree characterized by pinnate leaves, clustered flowers, and flattened seed pods typical of the genus. It grows in humid tropical forests and is adapted to the shaded understory environment.
