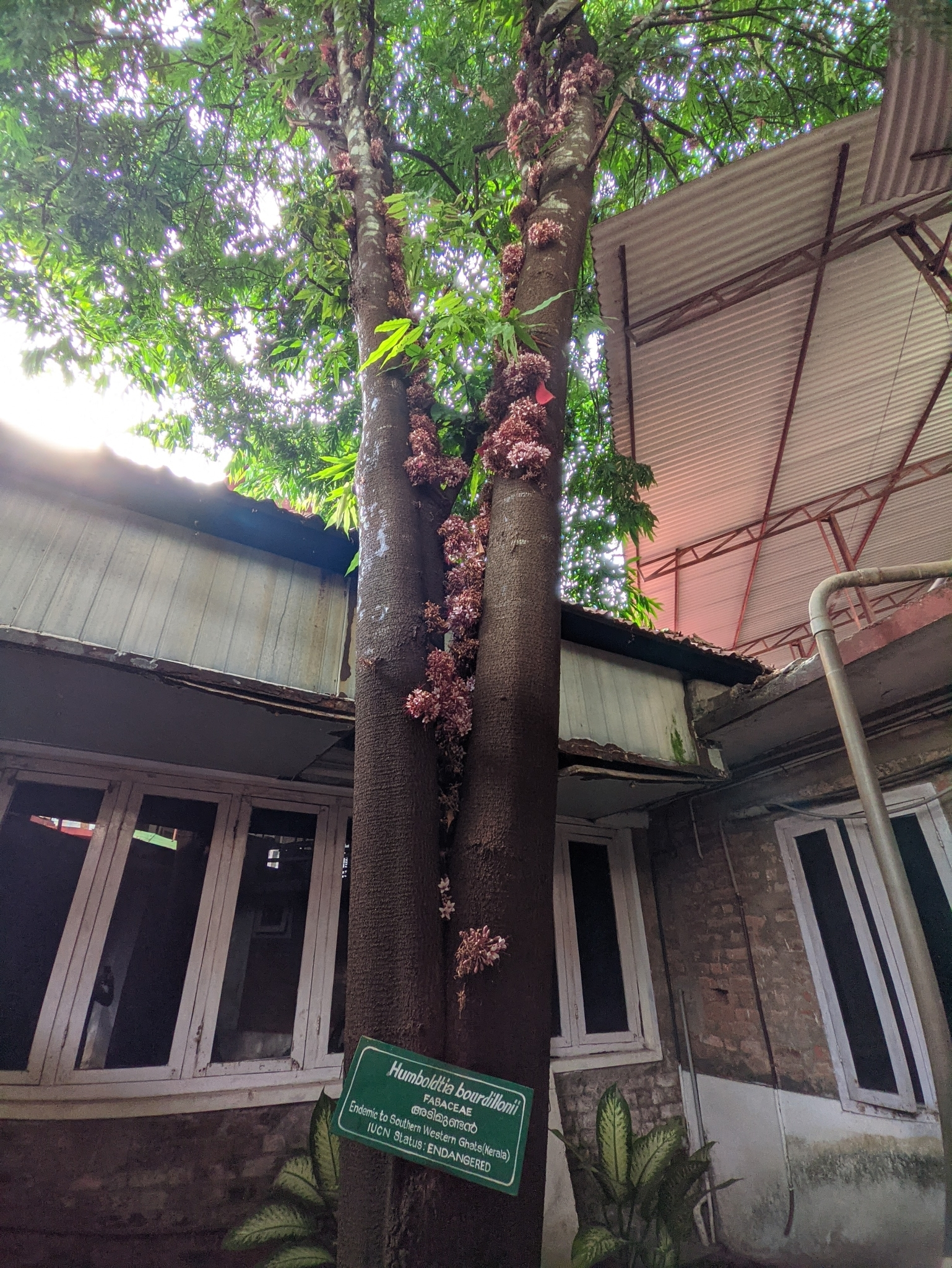

Conservation status
- Endangered (IUCN 2.3)

Scientific classification
- Kingdom: Plantae
- Clade: Tracheophytes
- Clade: Angiosperms
- Clade: Eudicots
- Clade: Rosids
- Order: Fabales
- Family: Fabaceae
- Genus: Humboldtia
- Species: H. bourdillonii

Binomial name
- Humboldtia bourdillonii Prain

= Humboldtia bourdillonii =

Species of legume

Humboldtia bourdillonii is a species of endangered plant, endemic to the Western ghats in India. It is a legume in the family Fabaceae. It is also known by the Malayalam name Adimundan.

== Description ==
These trees can grow up to 15 to 20 meters high. It has smooth bark. The leaves have 6-8 leaflets. The flowers are pink in color displaying corymb inflorescence and grows on the trunk. The young seeds are pale red in color and turns brown on maturity with each pod having 3 to 5 seeds. Flowering is from November to January and fruiting season is from January to May.

== Distribution ==
This tree was described by David Prain based on the collection of T.F. Bourdillon from the Peermade ghats of Kerala in 1904. It was rediscovered in 1998 from Periyar Tiger reserve. It is often seen growing near streams, rivulets of low elevation evergreen forest patches at elevations of 200 to 1200 meters. Recent research discovered a population of these trees further south in the Kulamavu forests and Vagamon of Idukki district.

== Ecology ==
The flowers were observed to be wind pollinated and the flowers open gradually throughout the day and opening completely between 4:30 and 5:30 PM. The poor viability of seeds from the open pollinated flowers was attributed to wind not carrying enough pollen load. Thrips were found causing damage to the inflorescence, flowers and young seeds while weevils were observed to be causing heavy damage to the seed pods. Besides, the seeds are recalcitrant with high moisture resulting in shorter germination window.

== Threats and Conservation ==
As per IUCN assessment done in 2024, an estimated 6000 mature trees exist in the wild close to the threatened riparian evergreen rain forests of the Western ghats. The population near Vagamon is under pressure from tourism related development. Short-distance seed dispersal, landslides induced by climate change were noticed to be other threats.

Conservation efforts for this tree species were attempted by Kerala Forest Research Institute where seedlings were planted in a protected environment. Different techniques of propagation were also being researched.
