= Malankara Dam =

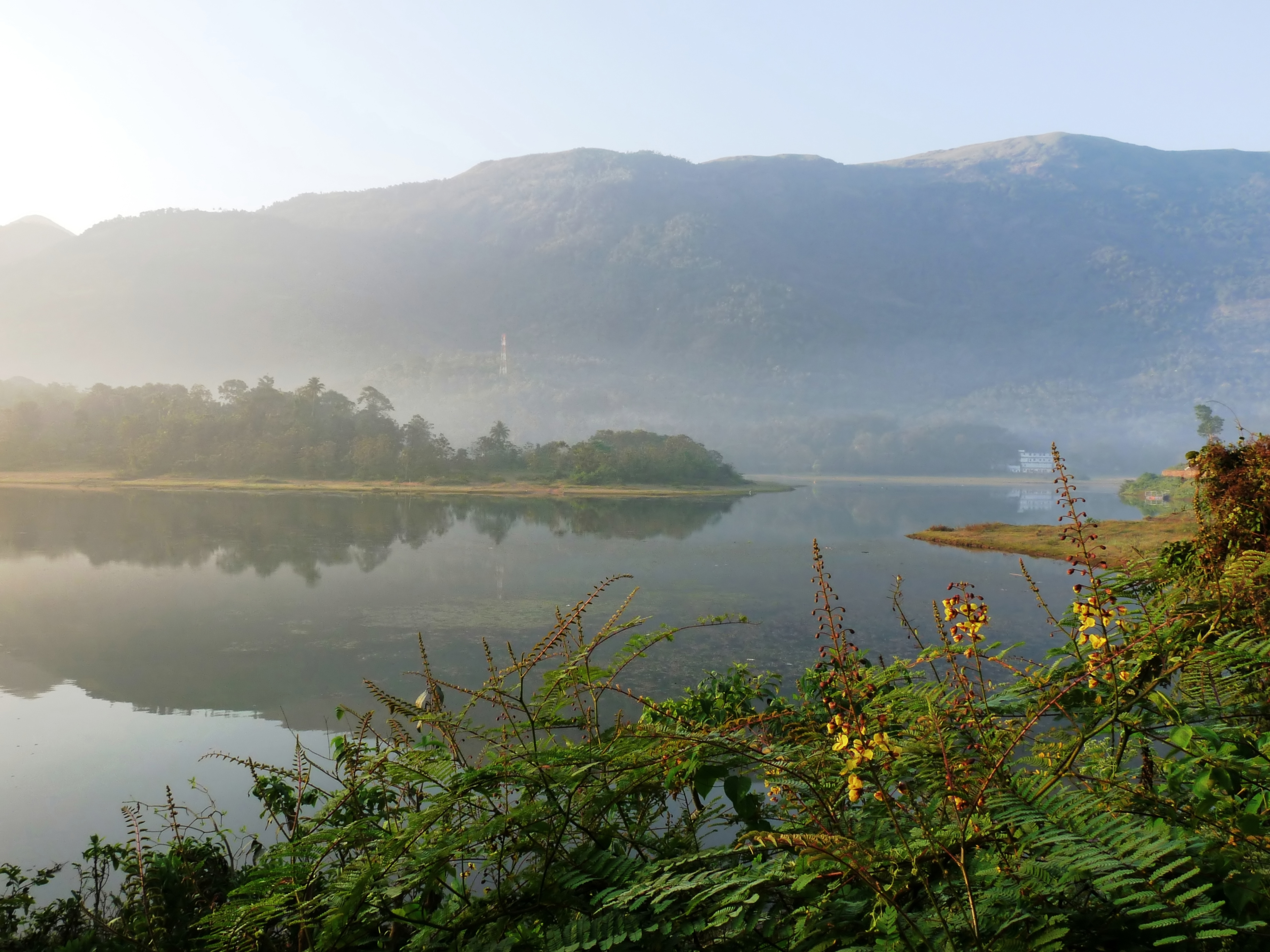

- Location within India Location within Kerala Location within Tamil Nadu
- Country: India
- Location: Thodupuzha, Kerala, India
- Coordinates: 9°51′10″N 76°44′41″E
- Status: Operational

Dam and spillways
- Type of dam: Gravity concrete

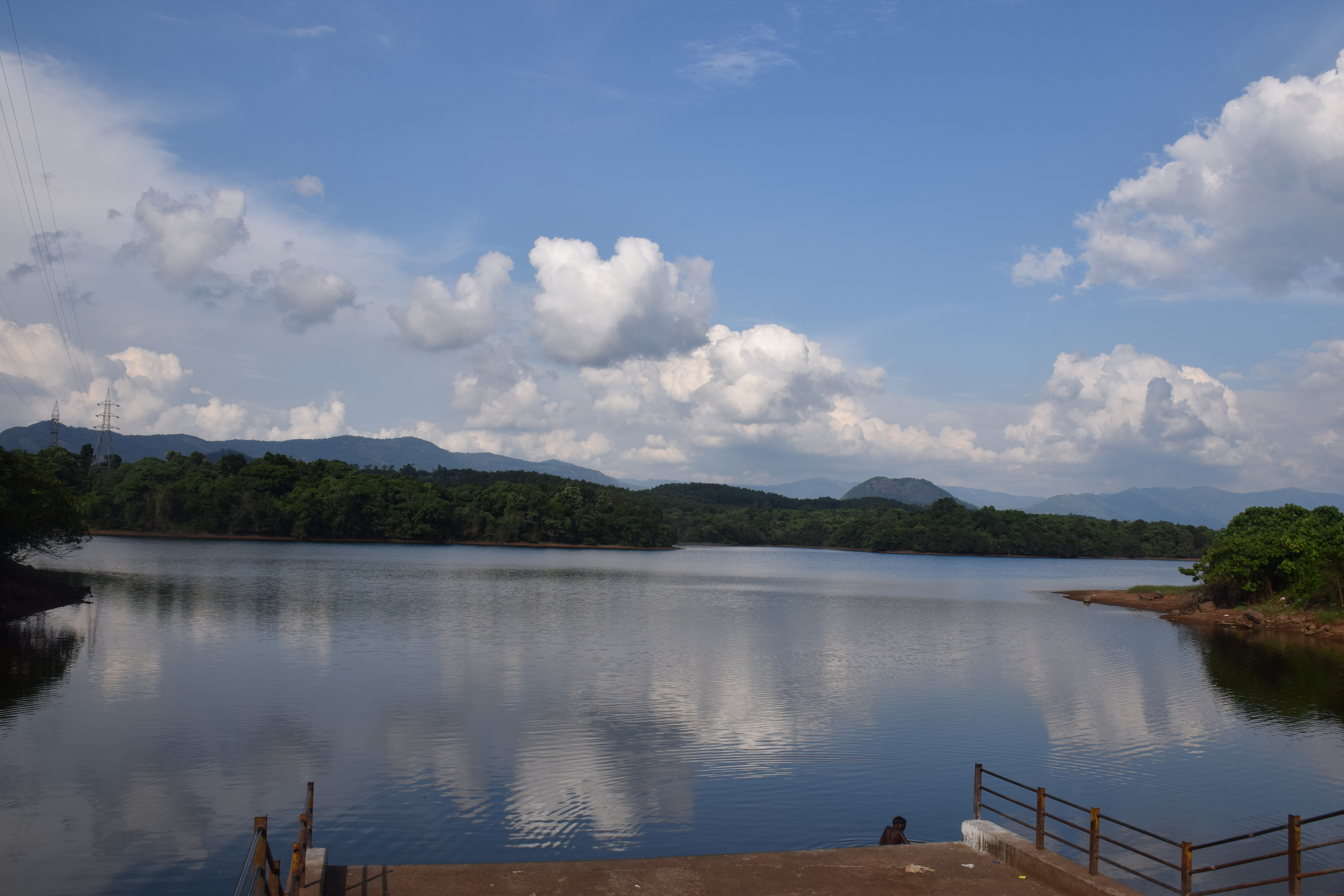
Malankara Dam View

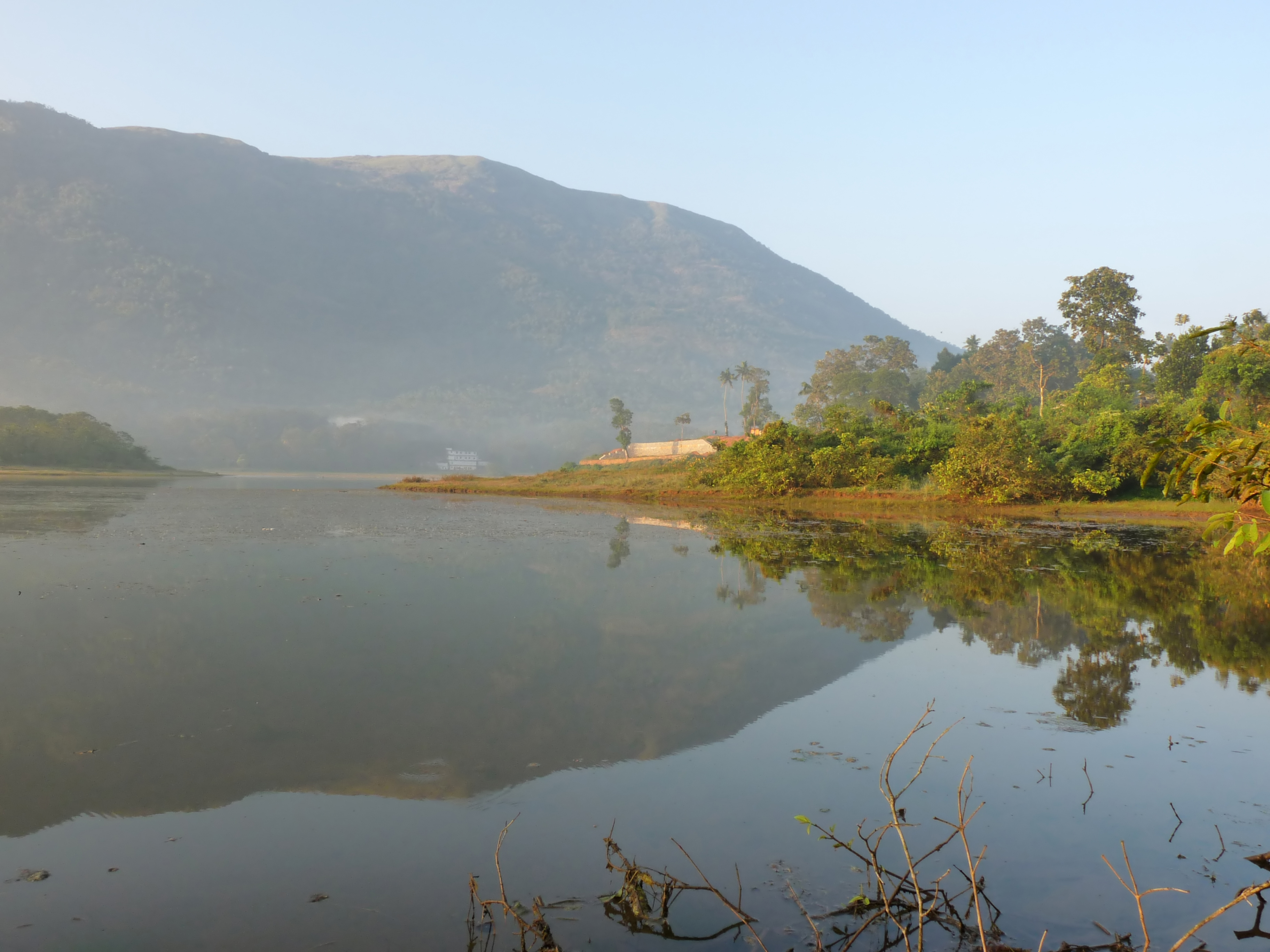
Dam reservoir

Malankara dam is a gravity dam constructed across Muvattupuzha river for irrigation purposes. The dam is constructed to make use of the tail water from the Moolamattom power house. The project is run under the Muvattupuzha Valley Irrigation Project and KSEB. The artificial lake covers an area of around 11 square km.

== Tourism ==
Constructed across the Thodupuzha river which is a tributary to the Muvattupuzha river, for the purpose of irrigation, this reservoir is also a tourism spot. This artificial lake is located near to the Thodupuzha – Moolamattom Road (State Highway 33) covering an area of around 11 square km. The reservoir is ideal for boating and fishing. Unlike the Idukki and Cheruthoni dams, the Malankara dam is open to tourists round the year. Also a park is under construction nearby to the reservoir covering an adjacent 15 acre island.

== Hydro Electric Project ==
The Hydro electric project utilizes the tail race water from the Moolamattom Power house which is stored by the dam. Three generators are installed with 3.5 Megawatt capacity each and a total of 10.5 Megawatt. The prime movers are Kaplan type turbines. The project was carried out by Public limited companies like SILK and TELK. Water at 25 Cubic meter/Second flows through a penstock which is 17.5 meter long and 3 meter in diameter to the power house. 44 million units of electricity is produced annually.

== See also ==
Muttom, Thodupuzha
