= Vazhikadavu Weir =

Diversion dam in Kerala, India

Vazhikadavu Weir is a diversion dam of concrete gravity type constructed across Meenachil River at Teekoy Village in Kottayam District in Kerala, India. The Vazhikkadavu weir is constructed as an augmentation scheme to Idukki HEP. The dam has a height of 10.20 metres (33.5 ft) from the deepest foundation and a length of 58 metres (190 ft).

Narakakkanam, Azhutha, Vazhikkadavu, Vadakkepuzha and Kuttiar diversion schemes were later added to augment the Idukki reservoir. The Vazhikadavu diversion scheme envisages diversion of the water from 6 km^{2} catchment of Vazhikkadavu Ar (tributary of Meenachil Ar.) to Idukki reservoir by constructing an unlined tunnel of 2,579.25 metres (8,462.1 ft) and a weir which is 58 m long for regulation and additional power generation of 18.2 Million units at Idukki Power station. The weir site and tunnel inlet are located in Meenachil taluk of Kottayam District and tunnel exit site is located in Peermade taluk of Idukki district. The diversion weir site is near Vagamon – 2 km from Vagamon town on Vagomon Erattupetta road. The construction started in 1989 but was completed in 2002.

== Specifications ==
- Latitude : 9⁰ 41′ N
- Longitude: 76⁰ 54′ E
- Panchayath : Teekoy
- Village : Teekoy
- District : Kottayam
- River Basin : Periyar
- River : Meenachil river
- Release from Dam to river : Meenachil river
- Taluk through which release flows : Meenachil
- Year of completion : 2002
- Name of Project:Idukki HEP
- Type of Project : Hydro Power
- Type of Dam : Concrete- Gravity
- Classification : Weir
- Maximum Water Level (MWL) : EL 939.00
- Full Reservoir Level ( FRL) : EL 936.70 m
- Storage at FRL : 0.18 Mm3
- Height from deepest foundation : 10.20 m
- Length : 58.00 m
- Spillway : Ungated – Overflow section
- Crest Level : EL 936.70 m
- River Outlet : 1 No. Circular type, 0.75 m dia
