= Kuravanmala =

Kuravanmala is a location in Idukki district, Kerala, India. It is the location of the Idukki Dam.

The idea of constructing a dam for power generation was first conceived in 1919. As per history, Shri Kolumban, the head of the 'OOrali' race during 1922, showed the way to the Malankara Estate Superintendent and his friend, AC Thomas Edattu, who were on a hunting spree in the forest, the spot of present Arch Dam. He told them of the legend of Kuravan and Kurathi Hills. Mr Thomas was impressed by the sight of water flowing between the mountains, and it was his idea that has materialized in the form of Idukki Arch Dam. Sri. W.J.John of Malankara Estate submitted a report to the Government of Travancore in 1932 on the possibility of constructing a dam at Idukki for power generation.

Periyar flows through a narrow gorge between two tall hills (known as Kuravan and Kurathi). Kuravan means a tribal, Kurathi his spouse, and mala means mountain. These two hills have been joined to form the biggest dam in the state which is five hundred and fifty feet in height and six hundred and fifty feet in width.
