= Kallar Dam =

Diversion dam in Kerala, India

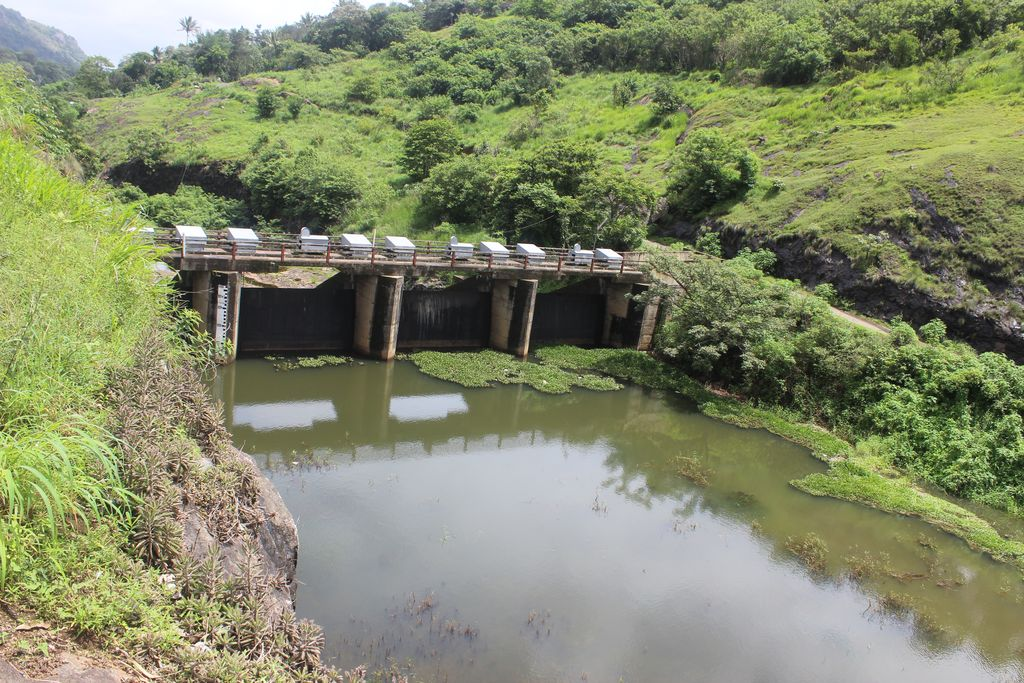

- Location within Kerala
- Interactive map of Kallar Dam
- Country: India
- Location: Kallar
- Coordinates: 9°49′31″N 77°09′22″E
- Purpose: Power
- Status: Operational
- Opening date: 1975
- Owner: Kerala State Electricity Board

Dam and spillways
- Type of dam: Gravity dam
- Impounds: Perinjamkutty river
- Height (foundation): 12.19 m (40.0 ft)
- Length: 57.91 m (190.0 ft)
- Spillways: 4
- Spillway type: Ogee type – Radial gates, each of size 7.62 x 6.10 m
- Website

Kallar Dam (Malayalam: കല്ലാർ അണക്കെട്ട്) is a small, diversion dam constructed at Perinjamkutty river in Nedumkandam grama panchayat of Idukki district, Kerala, India. It acts mainly as a diversion dam to supply water to the Idukki dam.

It is a small dam measuring 67.91 m in length and 12.19 m in height. The water stored in the Kallar Dam reaches the Erattayar River through a tunnel and the Erattayar Dam through the Erattayar River. Water reaches Idukki Dam from Irattayar Dam through Irattayar Tunnel and Anchuruli Tunnel. Taluks through which release flow are Thodupuzha, Udupanchola, Devikulam, Kothamangalam, Muvattupuzha, Kunnathunadu, Aluva, Kodungalloor and Paravur. Reservoir area of this dam and the Gavi dam combined is 25 hectares.

== Specifications ==
- Panchayath : Nedumkandam
- Village : Kalkoonthal
- District : Idukki
- River Basin : Periyar
- River : Perinjamkutty ( Tributary of Periyar)
- Release from Dam to river : Periyar
- Type of Dam : Concrete- Gravity
- Classification : LH ( Low height)
- Maximum Water Level (MWL) : 824.48 meters
- Full Reservoir Level ( FRL) : 824.48 meters
- Storage at FRL : 0.793 Mm3
- Height from deepest foundation : 12.19 m
- Length : 57.91 m
- Spillway : Ogee type – 4 Nos. Radial gates, each of size 7.62 x 6.10 m
- Year of completion : 1975
- Crest Level : 818.38 m
- Name of Project : Idukki HEP
- River Outlet : No outlet
- Type of Project : Hydro Power
