= Kulamavu Saddle Dam (Right Bank) =

Earthen dam in Kerala, India

- Interactive map of Kulamavu Saddle Dam
- Opening date: 1977

Dam and spillways
- Length: 384.96 metres (1,263.0 ft)

Power Station
- Coordinates: 9°48′21″N 76°53′16″E

Kulamavu Saddle Dam (RIght Bank) is an earthen dam constructed across Kilivallithodu at Arakkulam village in Idukki district, Kerala, India. It is one of the two saddle dams constructed to augment Idukki reservoir. The dam has a height of 27.43 metres (90.0 ft) and a length of 384.96 metres (1,263.0 ft). It is a rolled-earth-filled dam which has no spillways or river outlets.

== Specifications ==
- Latitude: 9°48'20.64"N
- Longitude: 76°53'16.32"E
- Panchayath Arakkulam
- Village Arakkulam
- District Idukki
- River Basin Periyar
- River Kilivallithodu
- Release from Dam to river N/A
- Taluk through which release flows N/A
- Year of completion 1977
- Name of Project Idukki HEP
- Purpose of Project Hydro Power

Project Identification Code (PIC) Nil

Dam Features

- Type of Dam Rolled earth fill
- Classification: Saddle Dam
- Maximum Water Level (MWL) EL 2408.50 ft. (734.30 m)
- Full Reservoir Level (FRL) EL 2403.00 ft. (732.62 m)
- Storage at FRL 1996.30 Mm3
- Height from deepest foundation 27.43 metres (90.0 ft)
- Length 384.96 metres (1,263.0 ft)
- Spillway No spillway
- Crest Level N/A
- River Outlet Nil
