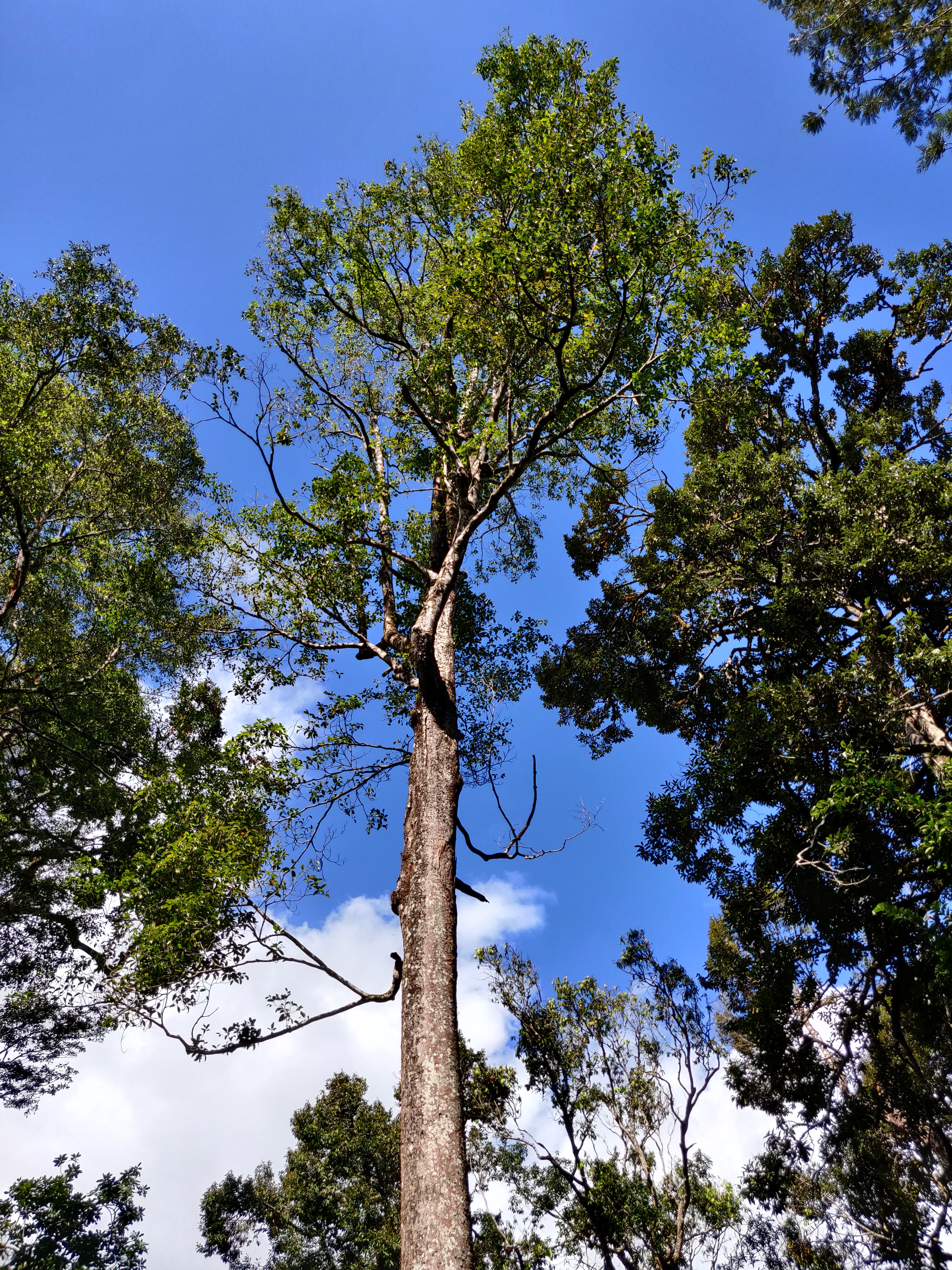
- Palaquium ellipticum tree in the Anamalai Hills

Conservation status
- Least Concern (IUCN 3.1)

Scientific classification
- Kingdom: Plantae
- Clade: Tracheophytes
- Clade: Angiosperms
- Clade: Eudicots
- Clade: Asterids
- Order: Ericales
- Family: Sapotaceae
- Genus: Palaquium
- Species: P. ellipticum

Binomial name
- Palaquium ellipticum (Dalzell) Baill.

Synonyms
- Bassia elliptica Dalzell

= Palaquium ellipticum =

Species of tree

Palaquium ellipticum is a tree in the family Sapotaceae. The species is endemic to the Western Ghats of southwestern India. It is a common canopy tree in low and medium elevation evergreen forests up to 1500 m.

== Description ==
This is a tall, buttressed trees, and can grow up to 35 m (115 ft) height. Bark is smooth, lenticellate, irregularly flaky when mature and the blaze is reddish brown. Branches are with architecture of "Aubreville's model"; The young branchlets are terete, puberulent, later it turns glabrous. It has a white and profuse latex. The branchlets are usually 2-3 mm thick, and sympodial. Leaves are alternate, simple, petioles 20-25 mm long, blade 7.5-10 x 3.7-5 cm. Leaf shape could be ovate or obovate, tip is obtuse, blunt, base is narrow, margin entire, and there will be 10-12 pairs of lateral nerves. Leaves are glabrous too. Flowers are bisexual, in axillary fascicles, 10-12 x 10-12 mm length, and the color is white. Fruit is a berry, 3-3.7 x 1-1.6 cm length, ellipsoid shape and, green. One seed per fruit.
