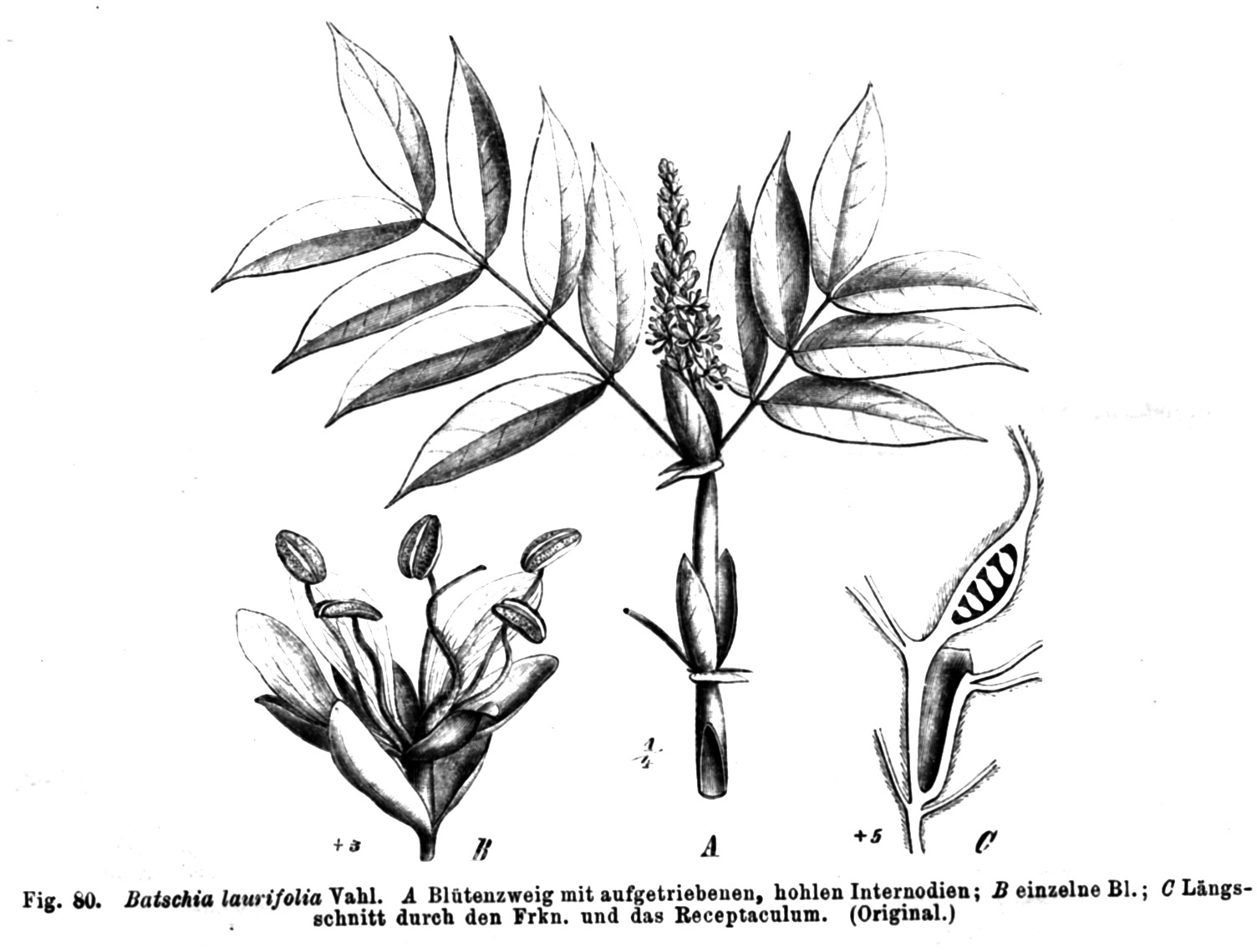

Conservation status
- Vulnerable (IUCN 2.3)

Scientific classification
- Kingdom: Plantae
- Clade: Tracheophytes
- Clade: Angiosperms
- Clade: Eudicots
- Clade: Rosids
- Order: Fabales
- Family: Fabaceae
- Genus: Humboldtia
- Species: H. laurifolia

Binomial name
- Humboldtia laurifolia Vahl

Synonyms
- Batschia laurifolia Vahl

= Humboldtia laurifolia =

Species of legume

Humboldtia laurifolia is a species of plant in the family Fabaceae. It is native to Kerala and Sri Lanka.
