= Kulamavu Saddle Dam (Near Junction) =

Earthen dam in Kerala

Kulamavu Saddle Dam (Near Junction) is one of the two saddle dams of Idukki Reservoir constructed across Kilivallithodu River, which is a tributary of Periyar river at Arakkulam village in Idukki District of Kerala, India. It is a rolled-earth dam with a height of 18.29 metres (60.0 ft) and a length of 457.2 metres (1,500 ft). The road to Idukki from Thodupuzha passes over this saddle dam.

== Specifications ==
- Location: 9°48′11″N 76°53′10″E
- Classification: MH – Medium Height
- Village: Arakkulam
- Maximum Water Level (MWL): EL 2,408.5 feet (734.1 m)
- District: Idukki
- River Basin: Periyar
- River: Kilivallithodu
- Release from Dam to river: NA
- Year of completion: 1977
- Name of Project: Idukki HEP
- Purpose of Project: Hydro Power
- Type of Dam: Rolled-earth
- Full Reservoir Level (FRL): 2,403 feet (732 m)
- Storage at FRL: 1996 Mm^{3}
- Height from deepest foundation: 18.29 metres (60.0 ft)
- Length: 457.20 metres (1,500.0 ft)
- Spillway: No spillway
- Officers in charge & phone No.:
  - Executive Engineer, Dam Safety Division No. II, Vazhathope, Idukki (Dist.), Kerala, PIN 685602, Phone 9446008425
  - Assistant Executive Engineer, Dam Safety Sub Division, Vazhathope, Idukki ( Dist.), Kerala, PIN 685602, Phone 9496011961
- Installed capacity of the Project: 780 MW
- Project Identification Code (PIC): KL29HH0059
