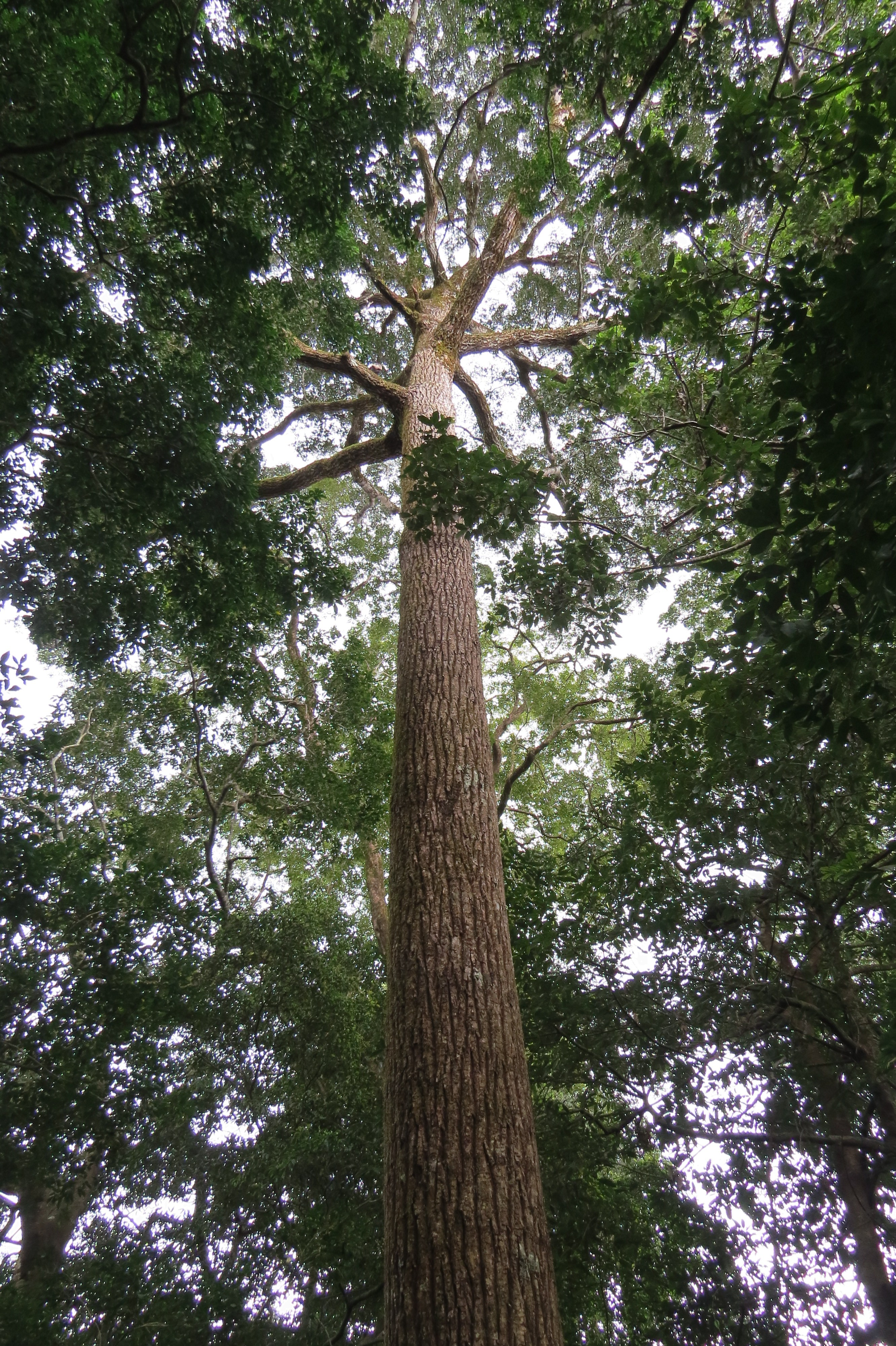
- Punnapine, in sabarimala

Conservation status
- Near Threatened (IUCN 3.1)

Scientific classification
- Kingdom: Plantae
- Clade: Embryophytes
- Clade: Tracheophytes
- Clade: Spermatophytes
- Clade: Angiosperms
- Clade: Eudicots
- Clade: Rosids
- Order: Malpighiales
- Family: Calophyllaceae
- Genus: Calophyllum
- Species: C. polyanthum

Binomial name
- Calophyllum polyanthum Wall. ex Choisy

Synonyms
- Calophyllum elatum Bedd.; Calophyllum smilesianum Craib; Calophyllum smilesianum var. luteum Craib; Calophyllum williamsianum Craib

= Calophyllum polyanthum =

Species of flowering plant

Calophyllum polyanthum is a species of flowering plant belonging to the genus Calophyllum of the family Calophyllaceae, commonly known as the poonspar tree, sirpoon tree, punnapine, pinnapai, punnappine, kattupunna and malampunna. This tree is native to the Western Ghats in India (Barak Valley and Kerala), where it grows in abundance. It is also found in northeastern India (Assam), Bangladesh, Bhutan, Cambodia, Laos, Myanmar, Thailand, Vietnam, and southern Yunnan province of China.

== Description ==
Calophyllum polyanthum are tall trees with many branches, growing up to 45 m (148 ft) tall. The wood is very tough and the bark color ranges from grey to brown. Outer bark is yellowish. Stems are branches and branchlets quadrangular, glabrous. The leaves are simple, opposite, decussate; petiole 0.8–2.5 cm (0.31–0.98 in) long, narrowly margined. It bears white flowers, which are fragrant and in panicles. The seed is a drupe, ellipsoid, apiculate, 3.7 cm (1.5 in) long, one-seeded. Fruits are yellow and dark purple at maturity, and the flowering/fruiting season is from June to September.

== Uses ==
The wood is used in construction, paper pulp, and furniture making. The timber is also used for making tea chests, tent poles, mathematical instruments, construction of ghat roads particularly leading to the sea coast. Seeds are used for illuminating purpose. Fruits are edible. Wood is anti-termitic.

== Diseases ==
Calophyllum species are susceptible to various insect pests, virus and fungi, affecting leaves, fruits and roots.
