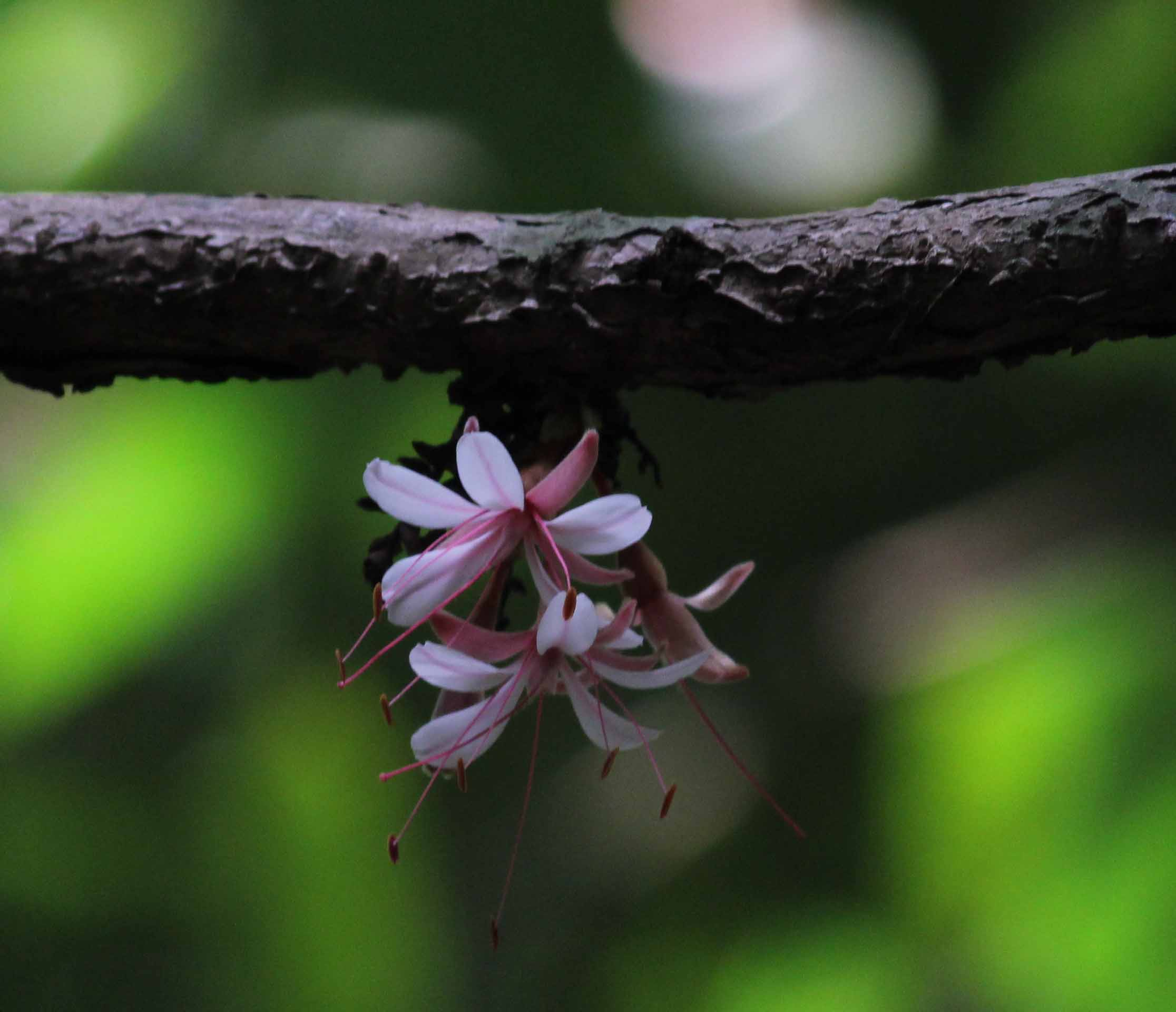
- Humboldtia decurrens flower

Scientific classification
- Kingdom: Plantae
- Clade: Tracheophytes
- Clade: Angiosperms
- Clade: Eudicots
- Clade: Rosids
- Order: Fabales
- Family: Fabaceae
- Subfamily: Detarioideae
- Tribe: Amherstieae
- Genus: Humboldtia; Vahl (1794), nom. cons.

Species
- eight; see text

Synonyms
- Batschia Vahl (1794), not validly publ.

= Humboldtia =

Genus of legumes

Humboldtia is a genus of flowering plants in the family Fabaceae. It includes eight species of trees and shrubs native to India and Sri Lanka. Most species are endemic to the Western Ghats of southwestern India, with one species ranging southwards to Sri Lanka. Typical habitats include tropical lowland and montane rain forest, often along rivers.

- Humboldtia bourdillonii Prain
- Humboldtia brunonis Wall.
- Humboldtia decurrens Bedd. ex Oliv.
- Humboldtia laurifolia Vahl
- Humboldtia ponmudiana E.S.S.Kumar, Shareef & Raj Vikr.
- Humboldtia sanjappae Sasidh. & Sujanapal
- Humboldtia unijuga Bedd.
- Humboldtia vahliana Wight
