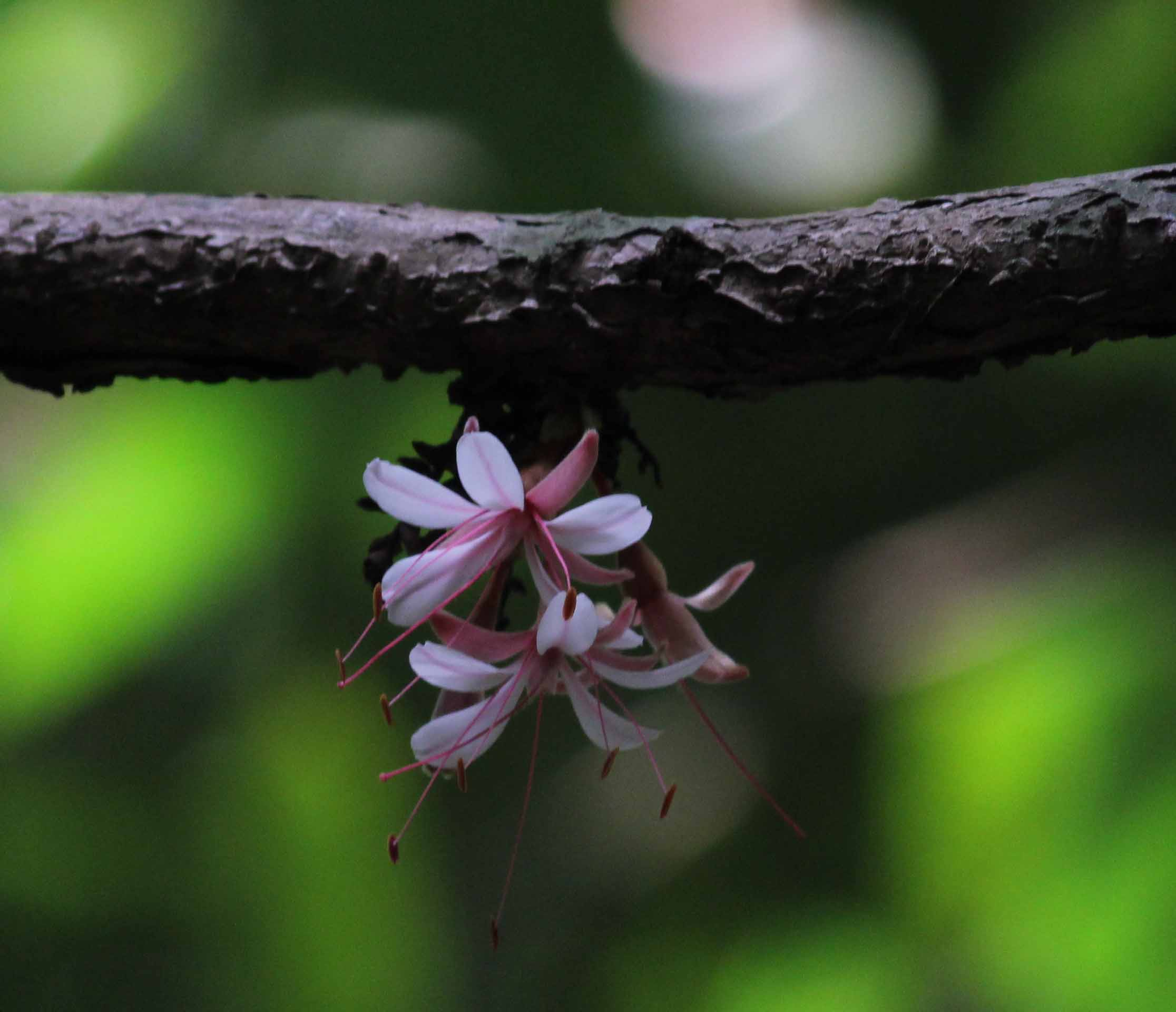

Conservation status
- Near Threatened (IUCN 2.3)

Scientific classification
- Kingdom: Plantae
- Clade: Tracheophytes
- Clade: Angiosperms
- Clade: Eudicots
- Clade: Rosids
- Order: Fabales
- Family: Fabaceae
- Genus: Humboldtia
- Species: H. decurrens

Binomial name
- Humboldtia decurrens Bedd. ex Oliv.

= Humboldtia decurrens =

Species of legume

Humboldtia decurrens is a species of plant in the family Fabaceae.

== Location ==
Humboldtia decurrens is a highly rare endemic tree found only in India in the southern part of the Western Ghats, ranging from the Anamalai Hills to the Travancore range.

== Habitat ==
A common species of low to medium elevation found in evergreen forests.
