= Thodupuzha River =

River in India

Coordinates: 9°59′08″N 76°35′02″E

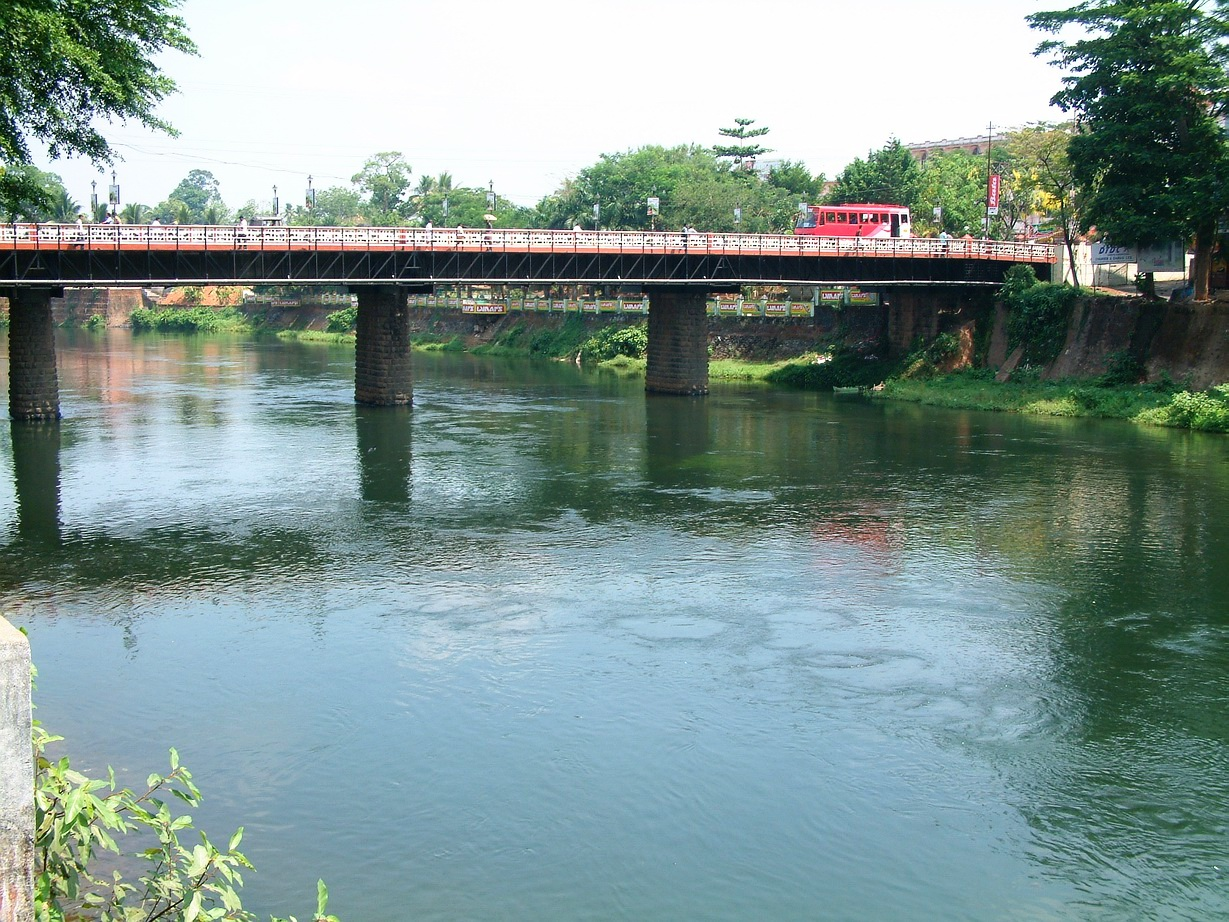
Bridge across Thodupuzha river

Thodupuzha River has its origins in the Thodupuzha Taluk in the Idukki district of Kerala, India, and is a tributary of the Muvattupuzha river. The river is one of the few in the state that does not become dry in the summer as the outflow from the Idukki hydro-electric project is drained into this river via Kanjar river. The town Thodupuzha is on the banks of this river, hence it got the name Thodupuzha.

The name "Thodupuzha River" as rendered in English is tautological. In the Malayalam language, the colloquial word for "river" or "creek" is translated as "puzha." Hence, the proper local name for the river would be the "Thodu" river. This is common among many English translations of Kerala rivers.

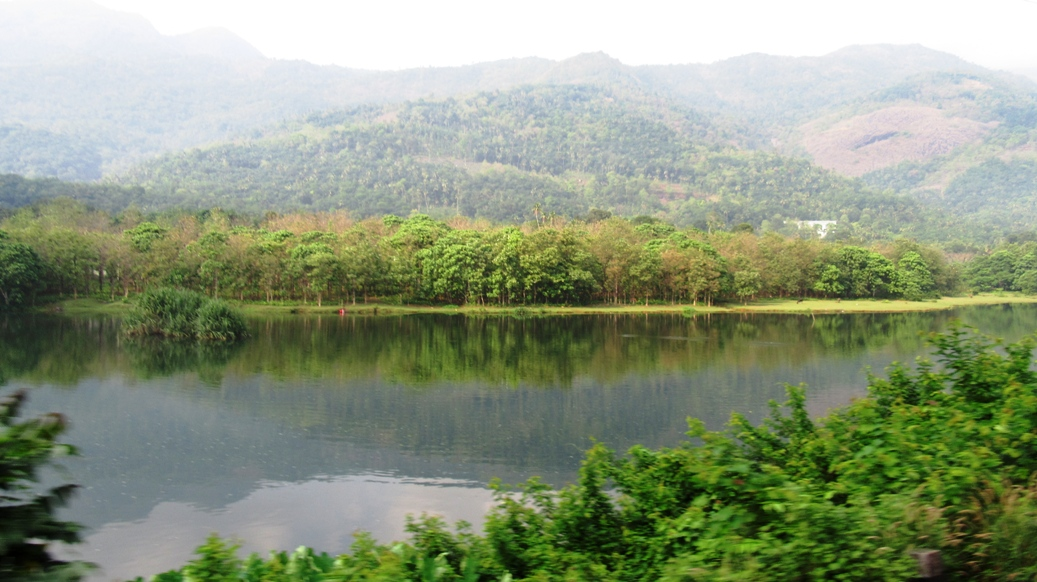
Kanjar river

Thodupuzha river and Kanjar is a major tourist attraction because of it serene landscapes and boating service. Kanjar is another major river which starts its journey from the Moolamattom powerhouse. Kanjar is fed by the water released after power generation from the powerplant. Kanjar is a perennial river and does not often become dry in summer although the water level may decrease significantly.

Muvattupuzha
