= Aubreville's model =

Schematic representation of Aubreville's model

Aubreville's model describes a distinctive way that certain tropical trees grow, creating a layered, pagoda-like appearance. It was named after the French botanist André Aubréville, who first noticed this growth pattern in the family Sapotaceae, though it is now known to occur in many other tropical tree families. In this growth pattern, trees have a single main trunk that grows in regular cycles or bursts. During each growth cycle, the tree produces a ring of horizontal branches that spread outward like the spokes of a wheel or the arms of a chandelier, creating distinct 'floors' of branches. These branches then develop their own complex branching patterns and bear clusters of leaves and flowers at their tips. The famous taxonomist Linnaeus recognized this distinctive branching pattern when he named the genus Terminalia (tropical almond trees), using it as a key identifying feature.

== Ecological variation ==
While all trees following Aubreville's model share the same basic growth pattern, they do not all end up looking the same. Field work on mature trees that conform to Aubréville's model demonstrates that the crown shape it produces is far from fixed. Fisher and Hibbs showed that some Terminalia species keep their distinctive layered, pagoda-like shape throughout their lives, whereas closely related Manilkara trees develop into hollow, dome-shaped crowns. Even though these trees follow the same basic growth rules, they end up looking quite different. This happens because of small adjustments—like how steeply branches angle outward, how often they regrow after damage, and how long leaf-bearing branches live—rather than any major change in their growth pattern.

Leaf placement studies offer a physiological perspective. In sun-grown Terminalia crowns, each horizontal tier carries a leaf area index (LAI) of roughly 2—a measure that means moderate leaf coverage, like a partially filled umbrella. Stacking four or five such discs gives a total LAI near 8–10 (dense overall foliage). Adult Manilkara, however, take a completely different approach—they pack almost all their leaves into a thick shell around the outside edge of the crown, like a green umbrella with a hollow centre, yielding a peripheral LAI of about 4 and leaving the interior largely leaf-free. Reiteration (the tree's ability to regrow its characteristic branching pattern after damage) modifies both genera still further: repeated reiteration can fill the interior of a damaged Terminalia crown with foliage, whereas in open-grown Manilkara it reinforces the umbrella-like outline without infilling. These findings show that while Aubreville's model provides a basic blueprint for how these trees grow, environmental conditions and each tree's individual responses ultimately determine what the mature tree actually looks like.
