= Cheruthoni Dam =

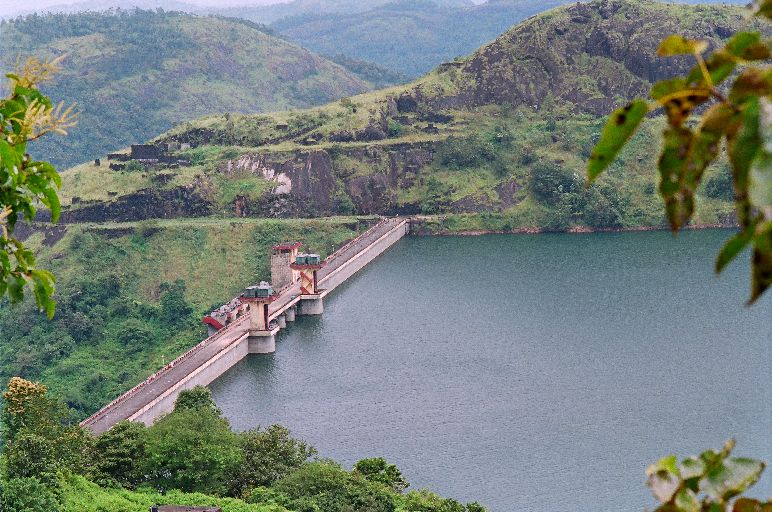
- Cheruthoni dam

- Location within India Location within Kerala Location within Tamil Nadu
- Country: India
- Location: Idukki, Kerala, India
- Coordinates: 9°50′43″N 76°58′01″E
- Status: Operational
- Opening date: 1973
- Owner: Kerala State Electricity Board

Dam and spillways
- Type of dam: Straight gravity concrete
- Impounds: Periyar River
- Height: 138.2 m (453 ft)
- Length: 650.9 m (2,135 ft)
- Dam volume: 17,00,000 cu.m
- Spillways: 7 no.s (5 radial floodgates gates Ft. and 2 vertical flood gates (river bed level) )
- Spillway type: Chute type spillway

Reservoir
- Creates: Idukki Reservoir
- Total capacity: 1,996,000,000 m^{3} (1,618,184 acre⋅ft) (70.49 tmc ft)
- Active capacity: 1,459,000,000 m^{3} (1,182,831 acre⋅ft) (51.57 tmc ft)
- Inactive capacity: 536,000,000 m^{3} (434,542 acre⋅ft) (18.93 tmc ft)
- Catchment area: 649.3 km^{2} (251 mi^{2})
- Surface area: 60 km^{2} (23 mi^{2})
- Normal elevation: 732.62 m (2,404 ft)

The Cheruthoni Dam, located in Idukki District, Kerala, India, is a 138m tall concrete gravity dam. Preliminary work on this project was initiated under the leadership of Superintending Engineer, E.U.Philipose. This dam was constructed in 1976 as part of the Idukki Hydroelectric Project along with two other dams Idukki and Kulamavu. The Canadian government aided the project with long-term loans and grants. The dam was constructed by HCC (Hindustan Construction Company Ltd.) and the consultant was S.N.C. Inc., Canada,

The water impounded by these three dams of Idukki, Cheruthoni & Kulamavu has formed a single reservoir spread over 60 km^{2} on a height of 2300 ft above Mean Sea Level. The Idukki Dam is a double curvature arch dam constructed across Periyar River in a narrow gorge between two granite hills and is the tallest double curvature arch dam in Asia. Cheruthoni Dam is located 1 km west of Idukki dam. The spill way of the Idukki Reservoir is in the Cheruthoni dam. Kulamavu Dam was constructed to prevent the water escape through a rivulet called Kilivally, 30 km west to Idukki Arch Dam. It is a 100 metres tall Masonry gravity dam. Construction of this Cheruthoni Dam, Idukki Arch Dam and Kulamavu Dam created an artificial lake of 60 km^{2} and the water stored, is used for electricity generation at the Idukki power station. Located at Moolamattom, it is the biggest underground power station in India and the pressure shaft is the largest in the country. Cheruthoni is the largest and highest gravity dam in Kerala. Storage of water in Idukki Reservoir started in February, 1973. Idukki power station was Commissioned in February 1976 by Prime Minister Indira Gandhi.

== Releases ==
Thrice in total, the floodgates of Cheruthoni had to be opened; twice during the northeast monsoon (October to December) of 1981 and 1992 and once during the 2018 Kerala floods. The first time was in 1981 (when the shutters were repeatedly opened and shut between 29 October and 13 November) and the second time was in 1992 (when they were kept open for 12 days from 12 to 23 October) and recently during the great flood of 2018 from 9 August 2018 to 7 September 2018, all 5 shutters were opened while all 14 districts of kerala were put under Red Alert with heavy disaster creating destruction all over kerala. On the first 2 occasions, the water level in the dam touched the brim only when the storage built up during the southwest monsoon (June to September) was augmented by the inflow received immediately afterwards following heavy downpour early in the northeast monsoon. On 9 August 2018, after a gap of 26 years, owing to continuous downpour of the southwest monsoon, the floodgates of dam in Idukki was opened. This was the first instance of water being released from the dam during the southwest monsoon season and also the first time in history when all 5 shutters of the dam were opened since it was commissioned in 1976.

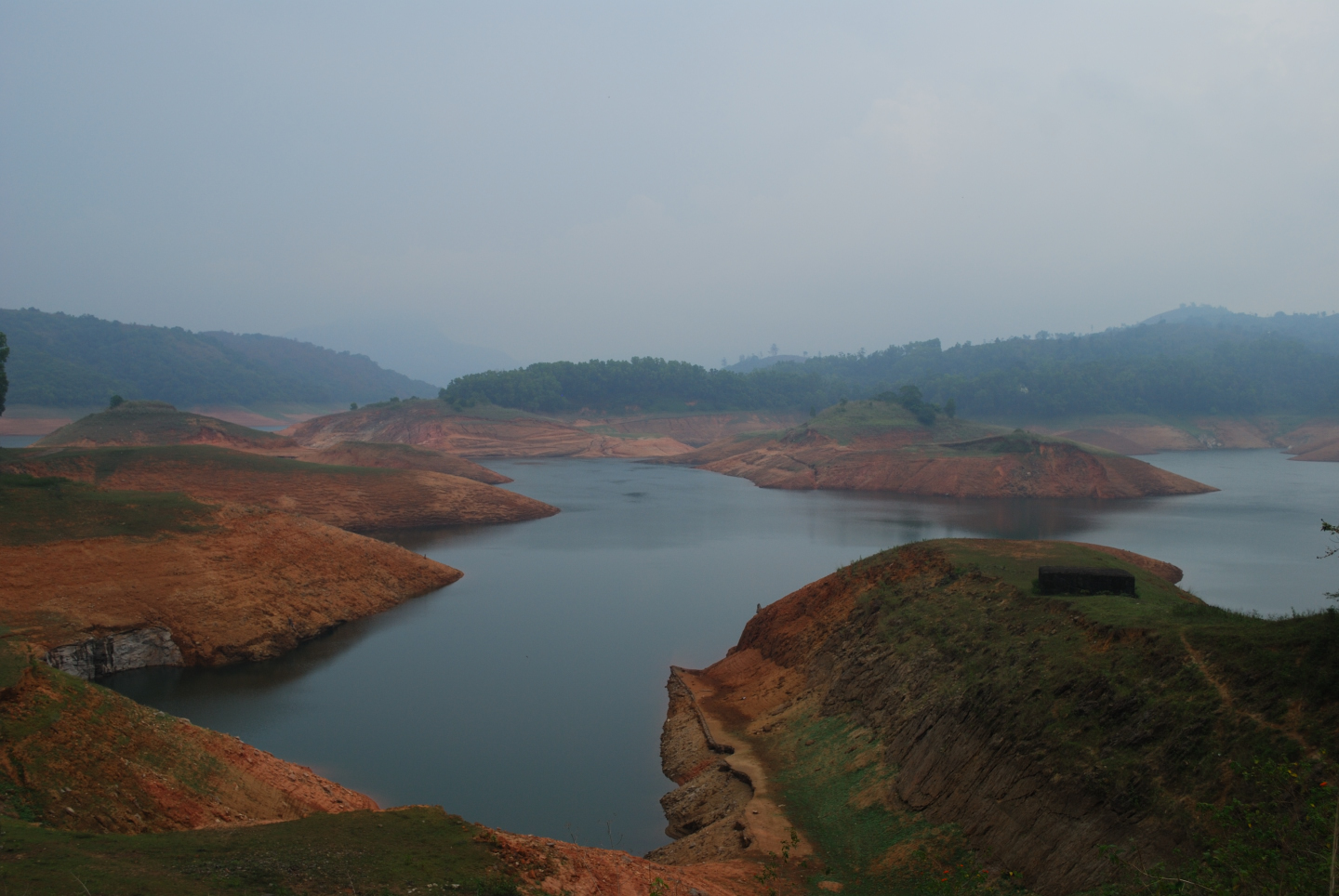
Kulamavu Dam Reservoir

On 10 August 2018, all five radial floodgates of the dam were raised for the first time in history with the water level in the dam exceeding the 2400 ft mark. The water level kept rising in Asia's biggest arch dam even after opening the first sluice gate which lead to the opening of all five gates within a matter of 26 hours. The spill gates sent down 750 cumecs (7.5 lakh litres per second) of water downstream, along with the heavy downpours resulting in widespread flooding along the state's longest river. On 15 August 2018 the gates were raised further owing to continuous downpour and release of water from Mullaperiyar Dam sending 1000 cumecs of water downstream.

Dams in Periyar

== Gallery ==
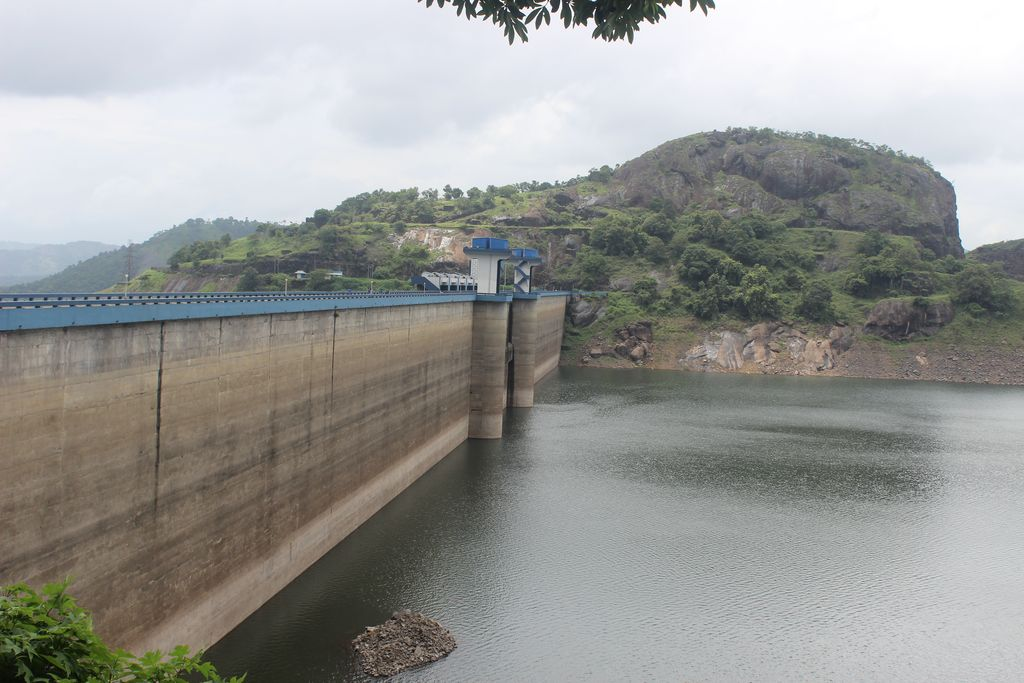
Cheruthoni Dam

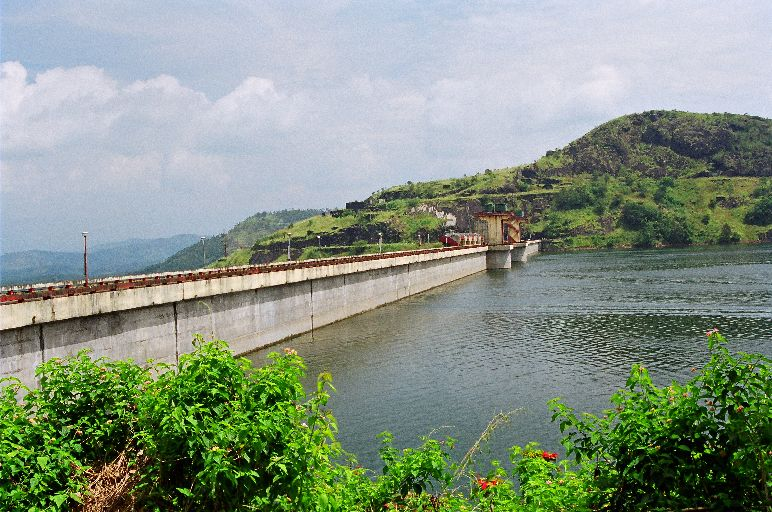
Cheruthoni dam

== See also ==
- List of reservoirs and dams in India
- Idukki Dam
- Moolamattom Power Station
- Cheruthoni
