= Moolamattom =

- village
- Location in Kerala, India Moolamattom (India)
- Coordinates: 9°47′0″N 76°51′0″E
- Country: India
- State: Kerala
- District: Idukki
- Taluk: Thodupuzha

Languages
  - Official: Malayalam
- Time zone: UTC+5:30 (IST)
- PIN: 685589
- Telephone code: 04862
- Vehicle registration: KL- 38
- Nearest city: Thodupuzha (22 km)
- Lok Sabha constituency: Idukki
- Vidhan Sabha constituency: Idukki
- Climate: Moderate (Köppen)

Moolamattom is the headquarters of Arakkulam panchayat in Thodupuzha taluk, Idukki district in Kerala, India. It lies 22 km from Thodupuzha, on the banks of the Thodupuzha River, a tributary of the Muvattupuzha river. Moolamattom is famous for India's second largest underground hydroelectric power station - Moolamattom hydro power station.

== Moolamattom Power Station ==
Moolamattom Power Station is the biggest underground hydro-electric project in India. The water from the Idukki Dam is carried by the underground pipes to the power station. The installed capacity of the power house is 780 MW consisting of six generator units of 130 MW each. The regulated waters of Periyar fall through a drop of about 669.2 metres (2195 feet) while generating power in the underground power house. The tail waters makes Thodupuzha river, a tributary of the Muvattupuzha river, at Thriveni sangamam which is 1 km from Moolamattom Power Station. Project work on this power station was initiated by Sri. E.U. Philipose, Superintending Engineer, Kerala State Electricity Board in 1964. Visitors are restricted from entry due to security reasons.

== Tourism ==
Thumpichi St. Thomas mount, Nadukani, Malankara Dam, Kudayathoor Mala, Vayanakavu Temple and Ilaveezhapoonchira are nearby attractions. Idukki Dam, the world's second and Asia's first arch dam, is 43 kilometers away from Moolamattom. There are several Malayalam and other language films shot at Moolamattom and nearby places. Purappadu Rasathanthram, Drishyam, Papanasam are some of them.

== Education ==
Schools: IHEP Govt UP School, Govt Vocational Higher Secondary School, St. George UP School, Sacred Heart English medium High schools are the elementary schools in Moolamattom.

College: St. Joseph's College, Moolamattom, is a liberal arts and science college is situated 5 km away from Moolamattom run by the CMI fathers. Established in 1980, it offers undergraduate and postgraduate degrees in Management, Social Work, Chemistry, Physics, Commerce, Economics and English language.

St Joseph's Academy of higher education and research is another education institution situated 5 km away from Moolamattom run by the CMI fathers. Established in 2007, they offers undergraduate and postgraduate degrees in Actuarial Science, Physical Education, Animation and Commerce.

== Important Personalities ==
NP Pradeep-Indian Professional Footballer Honey Rose

== Gallery ==
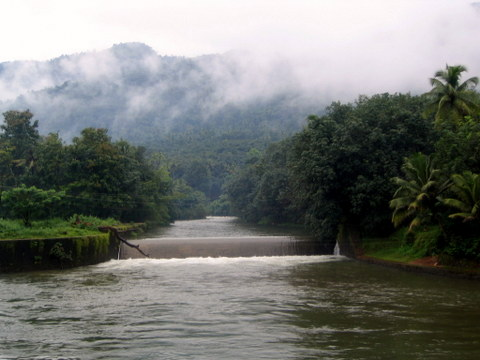
Thriveni Sangamam Moolamattom

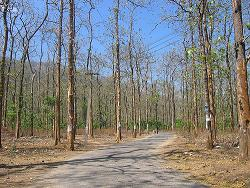
Teak plantation at Moolamattom
