= Azhutha Dam =

Dam in Kerala

- Country: India
- Status: Operational
- Opening date: 2007

Azhutha Dam (Malayalam:അഴുത അണക്കെട്ട്) is a small diversion dam built on the Azhutha River which is a tributary of the Pamba River, at Azhutha in Peerumed Grama Panchayat of Idukki District, Kerala, India. It is a small concrete gravity dam that is only 72 metres (236 ft) long and 14 metres (46 ft) high. It acts mainly as a diversion dam to supply water to the Idukki Dam. The Azhutha Dam was constructed as an augmentation dam for the Idukki Hydro Electric Project. Construction of the project started in 1987 and was expected to be commissioned in 1991, but the project overrun and was only partially commissioned in June 1998. The year of completion was 2007. The release of the water from the dam is to Azhutha river and it flows through Ranni and Ayroor taluks.

This project diverts waters from the 16.8389 km^{2} catchment of the Azhutha river, a tributary of Pamba river to Idukki reservoir and thereby increasing the power potential of Idukki Hydro electric Project by 57 MU.

== Specifications ==
- Latitude : 9⁰ 33′ 50 ” N
- Longitude: 76⁰ 59′ 30” E
- Panchayath : Peermade
- Village : Peermade
- District : Idukki
- River Basin : Pamba
- River : Azhutha river
- Release from Dam to river : Azhutha river
- Taluk through which release flows : Ranni, Ayroor.
- Year of completion : 2007
- Name of Project : Idukki HEP
- Purpose of Project : Hydro Power
- Type of DamConcrete- Gravity
- Classification : Weir
- Maximum Water Level (MWL) : EL 960.20 m
- Full Reservoir Level ( FRL) : EL 956.00 m
- Storage at FRL : 0.140 Mm3
- Height from deepest foundation : 13.50 m
- Length : 116.30 m

&Spillway : Ungated – Overflow section

- Crest Level : EL 956.00 m
- River Outlet : 1 No. Circular type, 0.75 m dia
