= Arakkulam =

- village
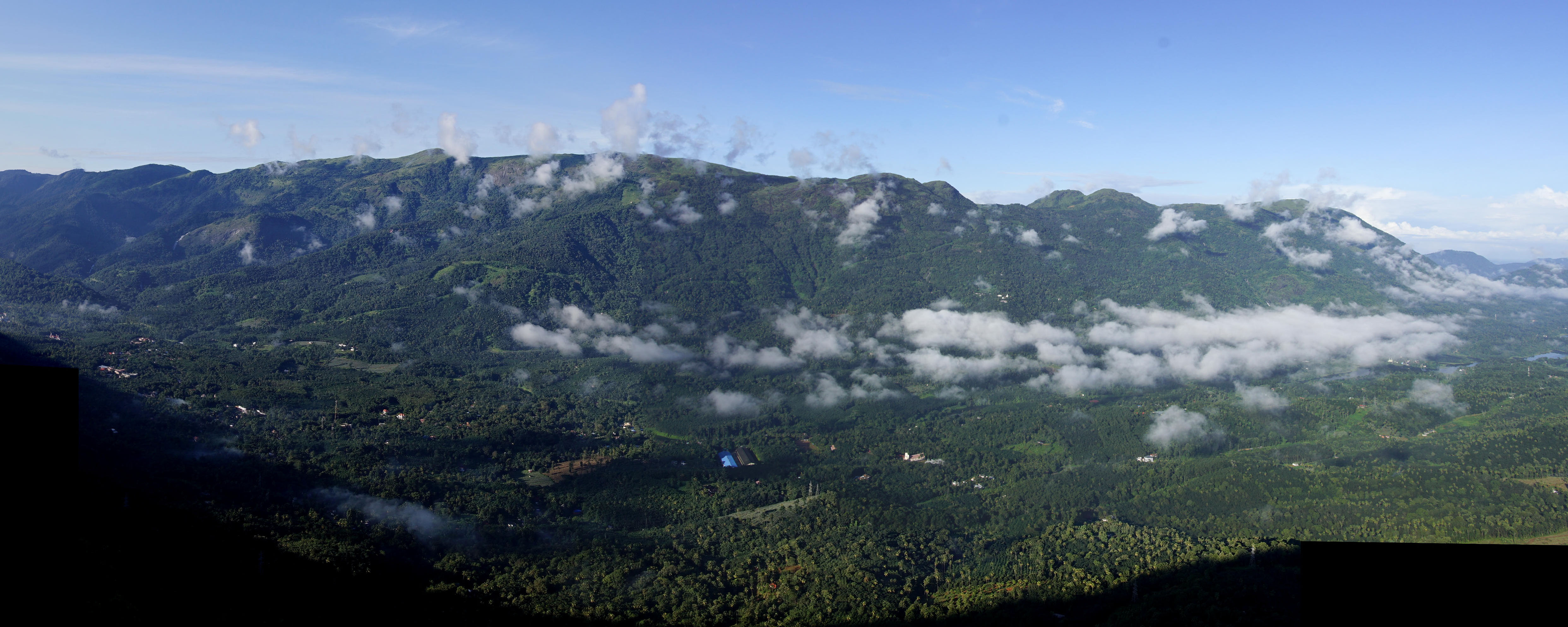

- Location in Kerala, India Arakkulam (India)
- Coordinates: 9°48′43″N 76°49′29″E
- Country: India
- State: Kerala
- District: Idukki

Population (2001)
  - Total: 12,633

Languages
  - Official: Malayalam, English
- Time zone: UTC+5:30 (IST)
- PIN: 685591
- Telephone code: 04862
- Vehicle registration: KL 38
- Nearest city: Thodupuzha
- Lok Sabha constituency: Idukki
- Vidhan Sabha constituency: Idukki

Arakkulam is a village in Idukki district in the Indian state of Kerala.It is 19 kilometres (12 mi) from Thodupuzha which is the gateway to the high ranges of Kerala. Thodupuzha-Idukki road goes through this village. Arakulam is enriched with the Moovattupuzha River, the tail end of the Moolamattom Hydro Electric Power station, and where the Malankara Dam is located.

== Demographics ==
As of 2001 India census, Arakkulam had a population of 12633 with 6201 males and 6432 females. The 2011 census of India recorded a population of 12421 with 5970 males and 6451 females in the village.
