= Peerumade Assembly constituency =

Constituency of the Kerala legislative assembly in India

Peerumade
- Constituency No. 92 for the Kerala Legislative Assembly
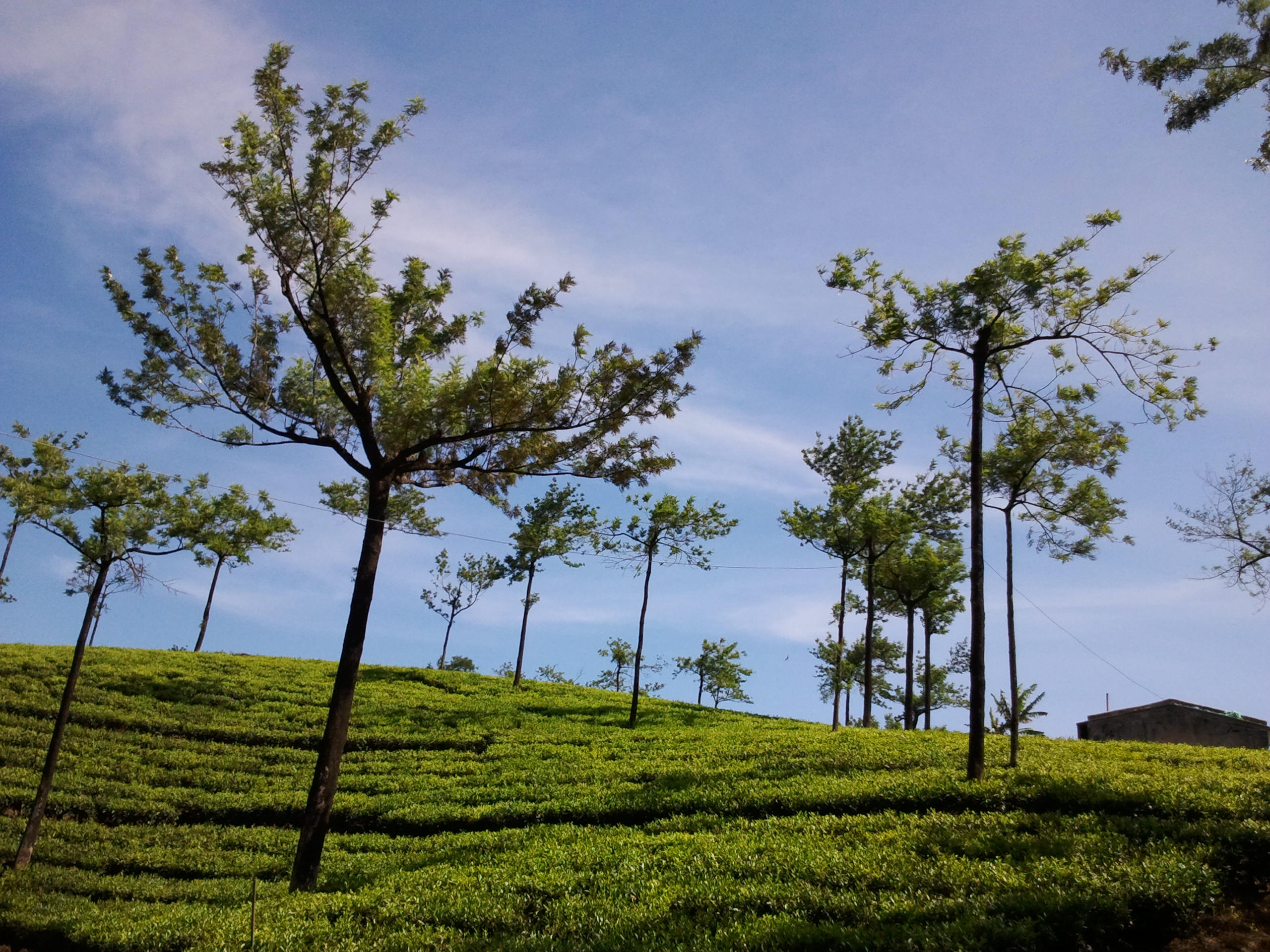
- Tea estate at Kumily

Constituency details
- Country: India
- Region: South India
- State: Kerala
- District: Idukki
- Established: 1965
- Total electors: 1,74,354 (2021)
- Reservation: None

Member of Legislative Assembly
- 16th Kerala Legislative Assembly
- Incumbent Cyriac Thomas
- Party: INC
- Elected year: 2026

Peerumade State assembly constituency is one of the 140 state legislative assembly constituencies in Kerala in southern India. It is also one of the seven state legislative assembly constituencies included in Idukki Lok Sabha constituency. As of the 2026 Assembly elections, the current MLA is Cyriac Thomas of INC.

== Local self-governed segments ==
Peerumade Assembly constituency is composed of the following local self-governed segments:

Sl no.	Name	Status (Grama panchayat/Municipality)	Taluk
1	Elappara	Grama panchayat	Peerumedu
2	Kokkayar	Grama panchayat	Peerumedu
3	Kumily	Grama panchayat	Peerumedu
4	Peermade	Grama panchayat	Peerumedu
5	Peruvanthanam	Grama panchayat	Peerumedu
6	Upputhara	Grama panchayat	Peerumedu
7	Vandiperiyar	Grama panchayat	Peerumedu
8	Ayyappancoil	Grama panchayat	Idukki
9	Chakkupallam	Grama panchayat	Udumbanchola

== Members of the Legislative Assembly ==
Election	Niyama Sabha	Name	Party	Tenure
1967	3rd	K. I. Rajan	Communist Party of India (Marxist)	1967 – 1970
1970	4th	K. I. Rajan	Communist Party of India (Marxist)	1970 – 1977
1977	5th	C. A. Kurian	Communist Party of India	1977 – 1980
1980	6th	C. A. Kurian	Communist Party of India	1980 – 1982
1982	7th	K. K. Thomas	Independent	1982 – 1987
1987	8th	K. K. Thomas	Indian National Congress	1987 – 1991
1991	9th	K. K. Thomas	Indian National Congress	1991 – 1996
1996	10th	C. A. Kurian	Communist Party of India	1996 – 2001
2001	11th	E. M. Augusty	Indian National Congress	2001 – 2006
2006	12th	E. S. Bijimol	Communist Party of India	2006 – 2011
2011	13th	E. S. Bijimol	Communist Party of India	2011 – 2016
2016	14th	E. S. Bijimol	Communist Party of India	2016 – 2021
2021	15th	Vazhoor Soman	Communist Party of India	2021 - 2026
2026	16th	Cyriac Thomas	Indian National Congress	Incumbent

== Election results ==
Percentage change (±%) denotes the change in the number of votes from the immediate previous election.

=== 2026 ===
2026 Kerala Legislative Assembly election: Peerumade
Party	Candidate	Votes	%	±%
INC	Cyriac Thomas	69,672	56.80	▲10.99
CPI	K. Salimkumar	42,038	34.27	▼12.98
BJP	V. Ratheesh	9,218	7.52	▲1.92
AAP	Joseph Jacob	508	0.41	
NOTA	None of the above	791	0.64	
Margin of victory				
Turnout		1,22,652		
INC gain from CPI		Swing		

=== 2021 ===
There were 1,74,514 registered voters in the constituency for the 2021 Kerala Assembly election.

2021 Kerala Legislative Assembly election: Peerumade
Party	Candidate	Votes	%	±%
CPI	Vazhoor Soman	60,141	47.25	
INC	Cyriac Thomas	58,306	45.81	
BJP	Sreenagari Rajan	7,126	5.6	
BSP	Biju Mattappally	818	0.64	
NOTA	None of the above	401	0.32	
Margin of victory		1,835	1.44	
Turnout		1,27,291	72.27	
CPI hold		Swing		

=== 2016 ===
There were 1,75,524 registered voters in the constituency for the 2016 Kerala Assembly election.

2016 Kerala Legislative Assembly election: Peerumade
Party	Candidate	Votes	%	±%
CPI	E. S. Bijimol	56,584	43.94	▼5.32
INC	Cyriac Thomas	56,270	43.70	▼1.41
BJP	Kumar	11,833	9.19	▲6.26
AIADMK	Abdul Khader	2,862	2.22	−
BSP	Benny Thomas	489	0.38	▼0.18
NOTA	None of the above	448	0.35	−
Independent	Ramaswamy Govindan	175	0.14	−
Independent	Joseph M. T.	107	0.08	−
Margin of victory		314	0.24	▼3.91
Turnout		1,28,768	73.36	▲3.70
CPI hold		Swing	▼5.32	

=== 2011 ===
There were 1,65,380 registered voters in the constituency for the 2011 election.

2011 Kerala Legislative Assembly election: Peerumade
Party	Candidate	Votes	%	±%
CPI	E. S. Bijimol	56,748	49.26	
INC	E. M. Augusty	51,971	45.11	−
BJP	P. P. Sanu	3,380	2.93	−
Independent	M. K. Suppu Royal	694	0.60	−
Independent	K. D. Vasudevan	667	0.58	−
BSP	Biju Mattapally	641	0.56	−
SDPI	P. S. Madhu	437	0.38	−
Independent	Joseph Jacob	307	0.27	−
Margin of victory		4,777	4.15	
Turnout		1,15,204	69.66	
CPI hold		Swing		

== See also ==
- Peerumade
- Idukki district
- List of constituencies of the Kerala Legislative Assembly
- 2016 Kerala Legislative Assembly election
