= Elappara =

- Town
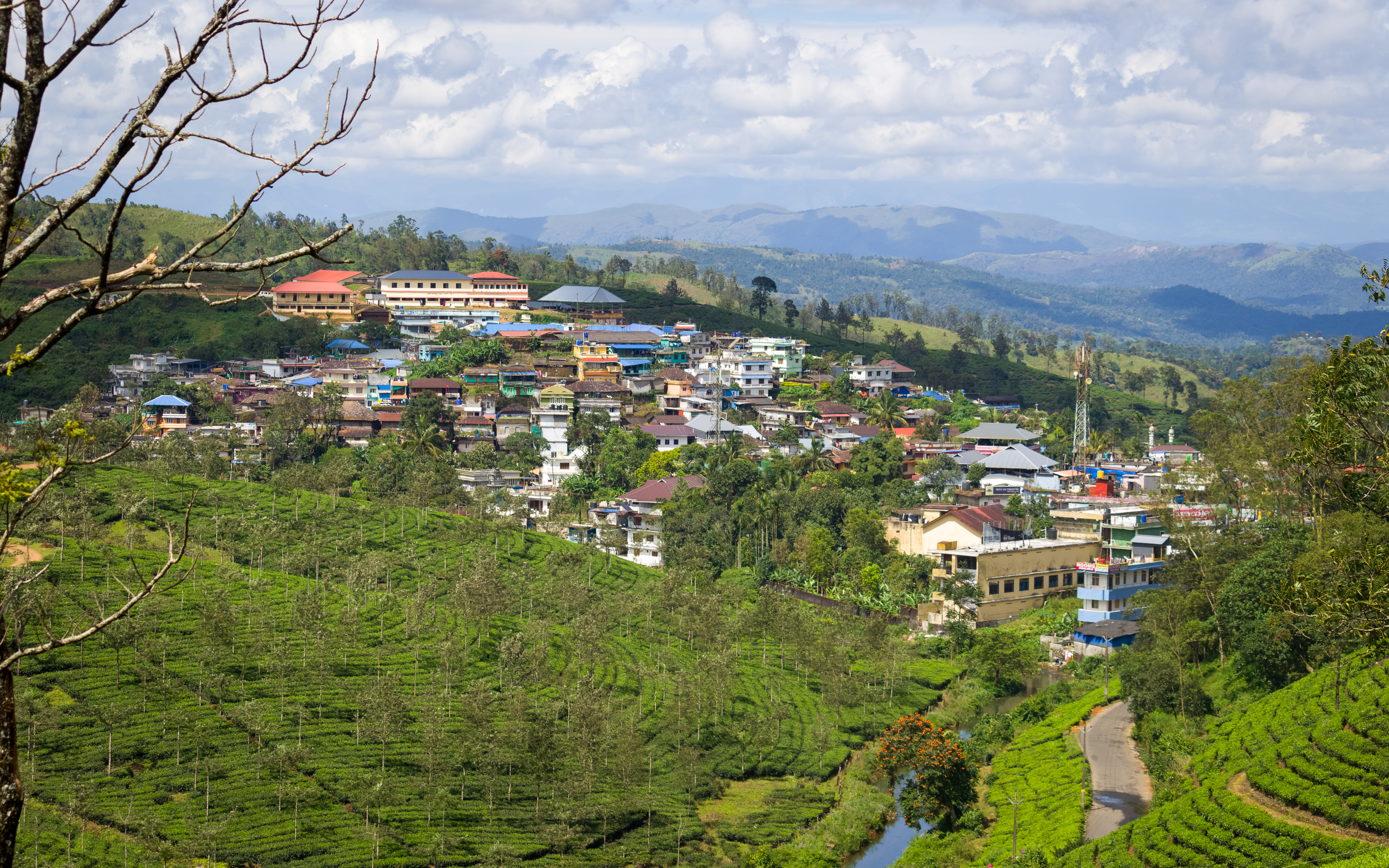
- View of Elappara town from Kattappana - Kuttikkanam road
- Interactive map of Elappara
- Location in Kerala, India Elappara (India)
- Coordinates: 9°37′0″N 76°58′0″E
- Country: India
- State: Kerala
- District: Idukki
- Taluk: Peerumedu
- Named for: Tea plantations

Government
  - Type: Panchayati raj (India)
  - Body: Elappara Grama Panchayath

Area
  - Total: 88.48 km^{2} (34.16 sq mi)
- Elevation: 1,050 m (3,440 ft)

Population (2011)
  - Total: 18,714
  - Density: 211.5/km^{2} (547.8/sq mi)

Languages
  - Official: Malayalam, English
- Time zone: UTC+5:30 (IST)
- PIN: 685501
- Area code: 04868
- Vehicle registration: KL-37
- Nearest towns: Kattappana, Mundakayam, Kumily
- Lok Sabha constituency: Idukki
- Vidhan Sabha constituency: Peerumade
- Sex ratio: 0.98♂/♀
- Website: lsgkerala.in/elapparapanchayat/

Elappara is a town in the Idukki district of the southwestern Indian state of Kerala. It is one of the panchayats in Peerumedu taluk. The area is marked by a cool climate as the region is situated at an elevation of over 1,000 m (3,300 ft) above sea level. Elappara is famous for its vast tea plantations.

== History ==
The modern history of Elappara began in 1836 with the clearing of the Vembanadu region by Henry Baker, a missionary of the Church Missionary Society (CMS). The Tyford estate was one of the earliest tea estates established in the high ranges, and the Penshurst plantation was also among the first in the region; both are located within the present Elappara panchayat.

During the Kollam era, the region that includes present-day Elappara formed part of the Thekkumkur kingdom. It was later acquired by Manavikrama Kulasekhara Perumal, the founder of the Poonjar dynasty. According to local tradition, Manavikrama rested at Thangalpara near Kolahalamedu during his journey to Poonjar. Remnants of Meenakshi idols carved on the rocks can still be seen at the site. Plantations began to be established in the area from the 1870s onwards. The tea cultivated in the area was known as Peerumedu hybrid tea, a variety with origins in China. By 1896, most of the land had been brought under tea cultivation. In the early 1900s, many of the plantation workers settled permanently in the region.

== Administration ==
Elappara panchayath was formed in 1953, including 17 wards, and it belongs to the Azhutha block of Peerumedu taluk. The surrounding panchayaths are Ayyappancoil, Upputhara, Kokkayar, Peruvanthanam, and Kumily.

=== Wards in Elappara panchayath ===
- Pullikkanam
- Uluppooni
- Kottamala
- Vattapathal
- Kochu Karumtharuvi
- Chemmannu
- Chinnar
- Vallakkadavu
- Haileyburia
- Kizhakke puthuval
- Kozhikkanam
- Thannikanam
- Elappara
- Tyford
- Bonami
- Kolahalamedu
- Vagamon

== Economy ==
Elappara is primarily a plantation township known for its extensive tea estates. A large proportion of the local population is employed in the plantation sector. The area is associated with the Elappara Tea Estate and the MASCO brand. In addition to tea, other major agricultural crops of Kerala are also cultivated in the surrounding region. Prominent estates in the vicinity include Tyford Tea Ltd, MMJ Plantations, and Haileyburia Tea Estates Ltd.

== Religion ==
The majority of the population is Hindu, Christian, or Muslim. Important pilgrim centers are the Luther Mission Church at Bonami, the Uppukulam Shree Krishna Swami Temple, and the Muhiyudeen Juma Masjid.

Muslims are a comparatively smaller part of the population.

== Tourism ==
The natural environment and landscapes of Elappara attract visitors. There are panoramic views from the roads leading from Elappara to Kuttikkanam and Vagamon. The Annan Thambi and Pullikkanan hills, meadows at Kolahalamedu, scenic Vedikuzhi, Elappara streams, and the numerous tea plantations are the main attractions for the visitors. Vagamon, a hill station in Idukki, is just 15 km from Elappara. The Periyar Wildlife Sanctuary and Mullaperiyar dam is situated near to this panchayath.

== Transportation ==
Elappara is located on the Kattappana–Kuttikkanam State Highway, approximately 8 km (5.0 mi) from Kuttikkanam and 32 km (20 mi) from Kattappana. Major long-distance buses to Kottayam and Changanassery stop here. Regular bus services also connect Elappara to Vandiperiyar, Kumily, Vagamon, Erattupetta, and Pala.

== Demographics ==
As of 2011 Census, Elappara had a population of 18,714 with 9,284 males and 9,430 females. Elappara village has an area of 88.48 km^{2} (34.16 sq mi) with 4,754 families residing in it. The average sex ratio was 1016 lower than the state average of 1084. In Elappara, 8.8% of the population was under 6 years of age. Elappara had an average literacy of 89.6% higher than the national average of 74% and lower than the state average of 94%.

== See also ==
- Kattappana
- Kuttikkanam
- Upputhara
- Ayyappancoil
