= E. S. Bijimol =

Indian politician

E.S. Bijimol
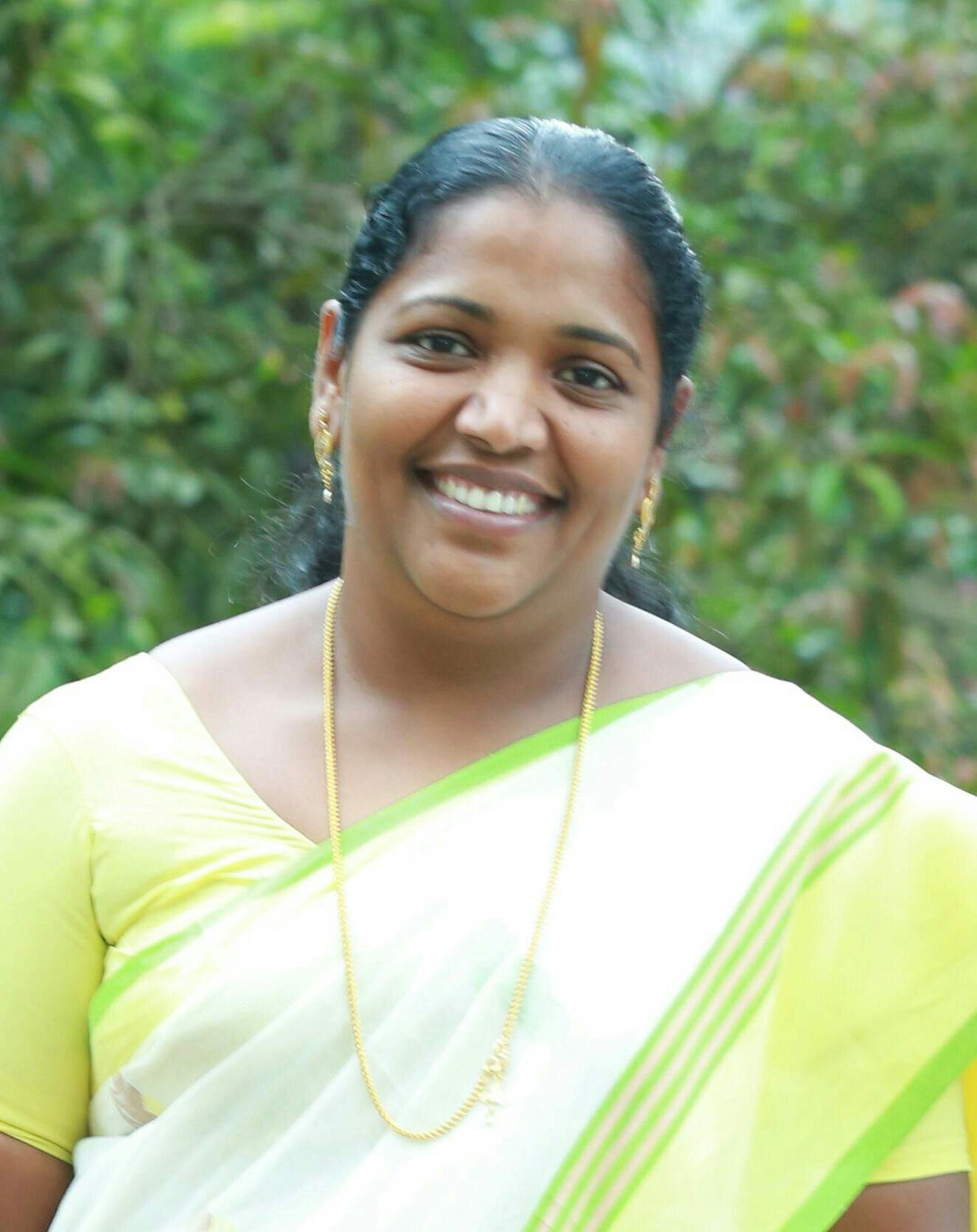

Member of the Kerala Legislative Assembly
- In office 2006–2021
- Preceded by: E. M. Augusty
- Succeeded by: Vazhoor Soman
- Constituency: Peermade

Personal details
- Born: 13 January 1972 (age 54) Upputhara, India
- Party: Communist Party of India

E. S. Bijimol is a politician and former Member of Kerala Legislative Assembly from Peermade constituency, Idukki.

== Life ==
She belongs to the Communist Party of India. She is one of the State Council members of Communist Party of India. She was born in Upputhara on 13 January 1972. She is the daughter of George and Annamma. She is working as a teacher as well as a political worker. She is an Executive Member of National Federation of Indian Women. In the year 1995 she was elected as the Block Panchayath President of Azhutha and she was holding the post until 2000 and she also served as a District Panchayath Member from September 2005 to April 2006. Her participation in protest of Mullapperiyar Dam issue was highlighted by all the media.
