= Kerala Literature Festival =

Annual literary festival held on the beaches of Kozhikode, Kerala, India

- Genre: Literary festival
- Dates: 22 to 25 Jan, 2026
- Frequency: Annual
- Locations: Kozhikode Beach, Kerala, India
- Country: India
- Years active: 2016–present
- Previous event: January 22 – January 25, 2026
- Next event: January 21 – January 24, 2027
- Patron: DC Kizhakkemuri Foundation
- Website: http://www.keralaliteraturefestival.com/

Kerala Literature Festival (KLF), founded in 2016, is an annual literary festival held on the beaches of Kozhikode, Kerala, India. The 9th and the latest edition of KLF was held from January 22–25, 2026. Kerala Literature Festival is organized by the DC Kizhakemuri Foundation, a philanthropic organization founded in 2001 as a tribute to late D.C. Kizhakemuri , a freedom fighter, social activist, writer, and publisher. He was instrumental in the abolishment of sales tax on books. Kerala Literature Festival (KLF) is endorsed and supported by the Government of Kerala, Kerala Tourism , and Culture Department. Renowned poet – critic Prof. K. Satchidanandan is the Festival Director along with Publisher Ravi Deecee of DC Books is the Chief Facilitator. The editorial team of DC Books works closely with KLF on the content.

== History, timeline ==
KLF 2026

The 9th edition of KLF took place from January 22nd to 25th, with Sunita Williams inaugurating the event. The speakers for the year included Jimmy Wales, Abdulrazak Gurnah, Abhijit Banerjee, Shashi Tharoor, Manu S. Pillai, Prakash Raj, Kiran Desai, Romila Thapar among others. Salman Rushdie joined for an online speaker session.

=== KLF 2025 ===
The eighth edition of the Kerala Literature Festival (KLF) was held from 23 to 26 January 2025. The four-day event featured 520 speakers and 330 sessions across seven venues, with a reported attendance of approximately 500,000 people.

=== KLF 2024 ===
The 7th edition of KLF was held from January 11–15, 2024. More than 500 writers around the globe took part in the event.

=== KLF 2023 ===
The sixth edition of KLF was scheduled from 12- 15 January 2023. The festival returned to the beaches of Calicut after a two-year hiatus due to the Covid-19 pandemic and was a grand celebration. KLF hosted Nobel Laureates, Oscar winners, Booker Prize recipients and other literary luminaries and celebrities from across the world. More than 400 speakers including bestselling writer Jeffrey Archer, Nobel laureates Abhijit Banerjee and Ada Yonath, Piyush Pandey, Francesc Miralles, Geethanjali Shree, Wendy Doniger, Ramachandra Guha, Palanivel Thiagarajan, Sanjeev Sanyal, Anand Neelakantan, Shashi Tharoor, Manu S. Pillai, Prakash Raj, and Shobhaa De took part in KLF 2023.

=== e KLF 2021 ===
Asia's first e literature festival, E-KLF 2021 virtual festival was a step towards building international relations during the devastating pandemic. The digital edition also witnessed an International Poetry Festival with over 50 poets from more than 10 countries including Palestine, Israel, South Africa, Italy, United States of America, Ireland. The sessions were premiered on YouTube and Facebook pages.

=== KLF 2020 ===
The fifth edition was held from 16 to 19 January 2020, at Kozhikode Beach, with the presence of artists, actors, celebrities, writers, thinkers, and activists, discussing literature, art, cinema, culture, dance, music, environment, science, and technology. Cultural nights include fireside chats by acts and performing artists from around the world. Speakers at the previous editions include Arundhati Roy, Richard Stallman, Noam Chomsky (Video), Yuval Noah Harari (Video), Sadhguru, Romila Thapar, Ramachandra Guha, Shashi Tharoor, Rakesh Sharma, Rishi Kapoor, Chetan Bhagath, Karan Thapar, Rajdeep Sardesai, Sobhaa De and Sagarika Ghose. In addition to literature, topics include environment and climate change. Spain was the guest nation, and Tamil literature was featured. The festival is open to the public and is non-exclusive and an open platform for discussions and idea exchanges.

=== KLF 2019 ===
The fourth edition of the festival was held from 10 to 13 January 2019, at Kozhikode Beach with 500 + renowned authors, discussions, poetry festival, music, dance, movie screenings and photo exhibitions. Wales was chosen as the guest nation. Set in five tracks- Ezhuthola, Aksharam, Thulika, Vaaku, Vellithira. Kijote Kathakali by Ignacio Garcia, Sufi Rock Outfit Alif featuring Ulrike Almut Sandig, Russian Music & Dance, Concert by L Subramaniam, Steffan Donnely performed a bilingual piece of contemporary theater, Qawwali night by Mystic Sufiana Mehfil were some of the defining moments of KLF 2019. Richard Stallman, Yuval Noah Harrari, Shashi Tharoor, Satish Aalekar, Keki Daruwala, Chetan Bhagat, Caryl Lewis, Ravinder Singh Jeet Thayil attended the festival.

=== KLF 2018 ===
The third edition of the festival was held from 8–11 February 2018, at Kozhikode Beach. KLF 2018 was inaugurated by Arundhati Roy, MT Vasudevan Nair and Prakash Raj. The event was supported by the Kerala State Government and the Kerala Tourism Department, and by the Kozhikode Municipal Corporation and the district administration. The Kochi Muziris Biennale was an integral part of the festival. Guest nation for the year was Ireland (represented by Gabriel Rosenstock, Paddy Bushe, Liam Carson, Alan Titley, Amanda Bell, and Conor Kostick). Romila Thapar, Ashis Nandy, Sagarika Ghose, Rajdeep Sardesai, Noam Chomsky, Rishi Kapoor participated.

=== KLF 2017 ===
The second edition of Kerala Literature Festival was held from 2–5 February 2017, at Kozhikode Beach.

Noted Malayalam short story writer and novelist Paul Zacharia inaugurated KLF 2017. Highlight of KLF 2017 was the interaction between Sadguru jaggi vasudev, Sashi Kumar and Manju Warrier. Cartoons of O. V. Vijayan were also exhibited in 2017 Kerala Literature Festival. Over 300 writers from across the world took part in KLF 2017.The writers from abroad include South African writer Ari Sitas, and British-Pakistani writer Qaisra Shahraz, Slovene writer Evald Flisar, translator and editor of numerous publications Alexandra Büchler of Literature Across Frontiers, Portuguese translator Bruno Viera Amaral and poet and literary curator Nia Davies from Wales, United Kingdom.The sessions held in four venues titled Ezhuthola, Aksharam, Thulika, and Vellithira.

The second edition of the festival introduced a programme for students, 'Student KLF', promoting knowledge, literature, art and culture. The event included open discussions with authors on contemporary topics.

=== KLF 2016 ===
DC Kizhakemuri Foundation first thought of a cultural space for people to interact and come together which was later conceptualized in 2016 as Kerala Literature Festival. At Calicut is a converging place of history, culture and trade. Vasco da Gama, the great Portuguese explorer touched down the Indian subcontinent on the shores of the city. The Freedom Square, permanent venue of KLF was constructed by former MLA M Pradeep Kumar constructed the square. The architect's team, De- Earth led by P.P Vivek and Vinod Cyriac envisioned and designed the Square. The Freedom Square today ranks among the six world's must-see museums and was featured in Architecture Plus Design.

The festival aims to provide a non-aligned platform for cultural exchange and promotes free speech and dialogue. It brings writers, thinkers, and activists closer, to people of varied backgrounds and interests and empowers writers and thinkers to take the liberty to exercise freedom of thought and expression. The first edition witnessed writers and speakers including M T Vasudevan Nair, Adoor Gopalakrishnan, Anand, Taslima Nasrin, Ashok Vajpeyi, Khadeeja Mumtaz, M.Mukundan, Sarah Joseph, Githa Hariharan, Meena Kandasamy, Pratibha Ray, TD Ramakrishnan, T Padmanabhan, Subhash Chandran, Leena Manimekalai , and Girish Kasaravalli, to name a few.

== Children’s Kerala Literature Festival ( CKLF ) ==
By bringing together voices from diverse literary traditions and international delegations, CKLF offers children exposure to global narratives and creative practices. The festival venue is designed to be welcoming and child-centric, encouraging curiosity, imagination, and exploration—making literature accessible for young readers.

Access to selected sessions of the Children’s Kerala Literature Festival has been managed through structured ticketing and pre-registration systems to regulate attendance and ensure controlled entry.

== Gallery ==
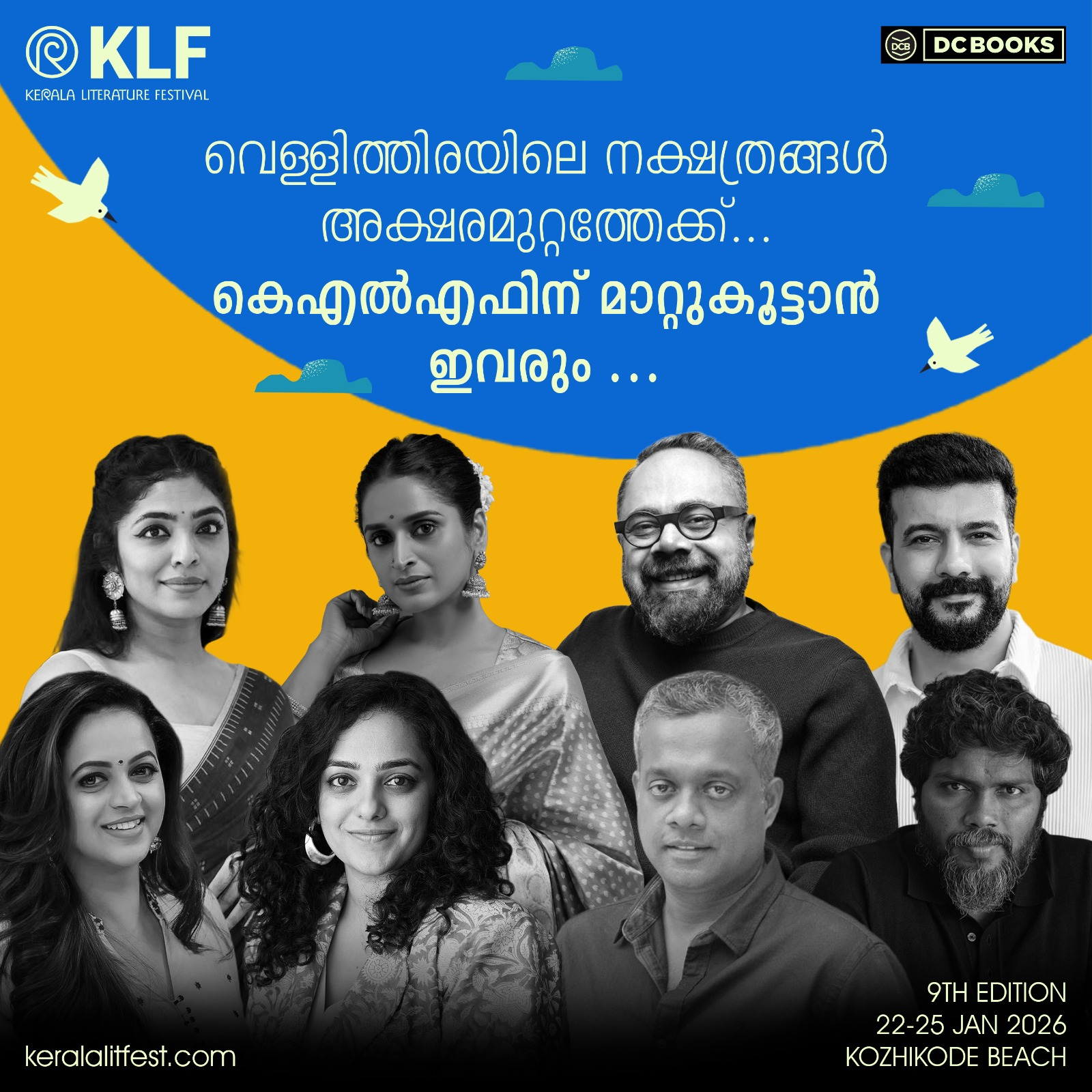

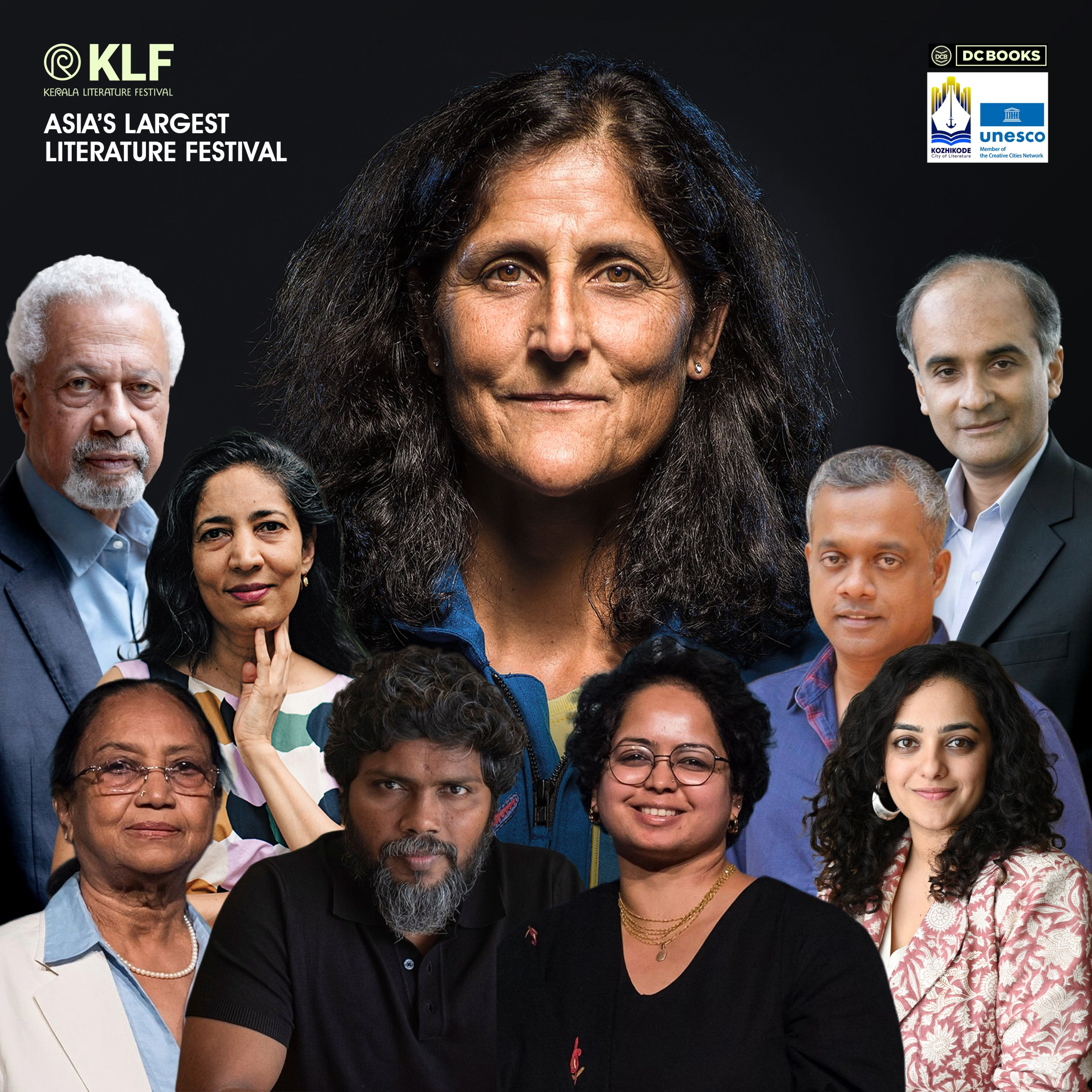

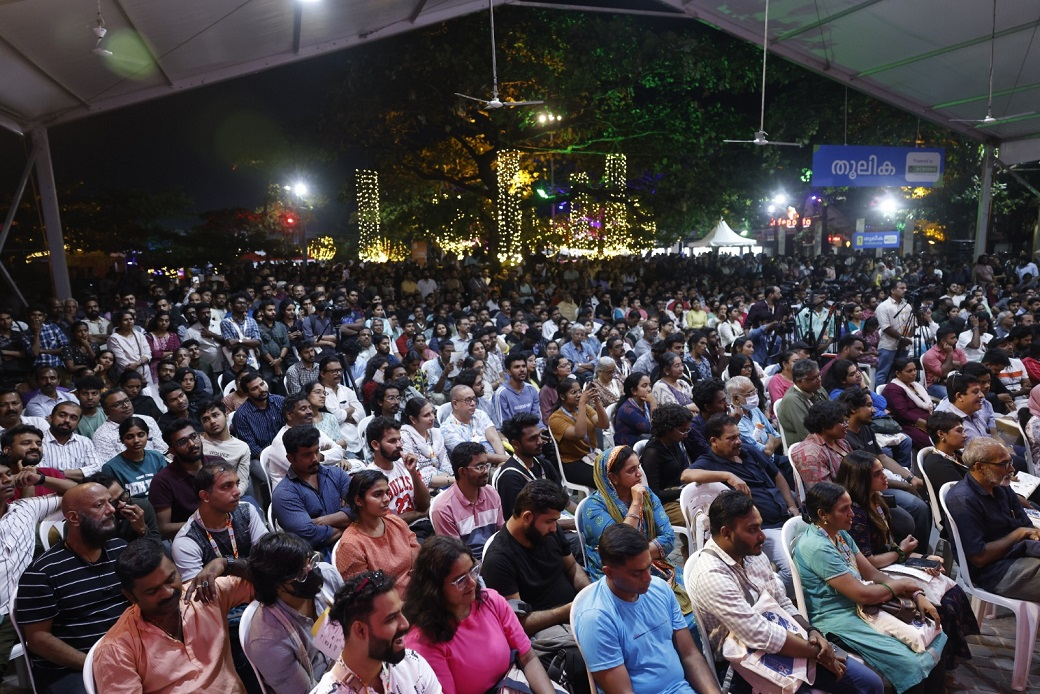
klf 2025 session crowd

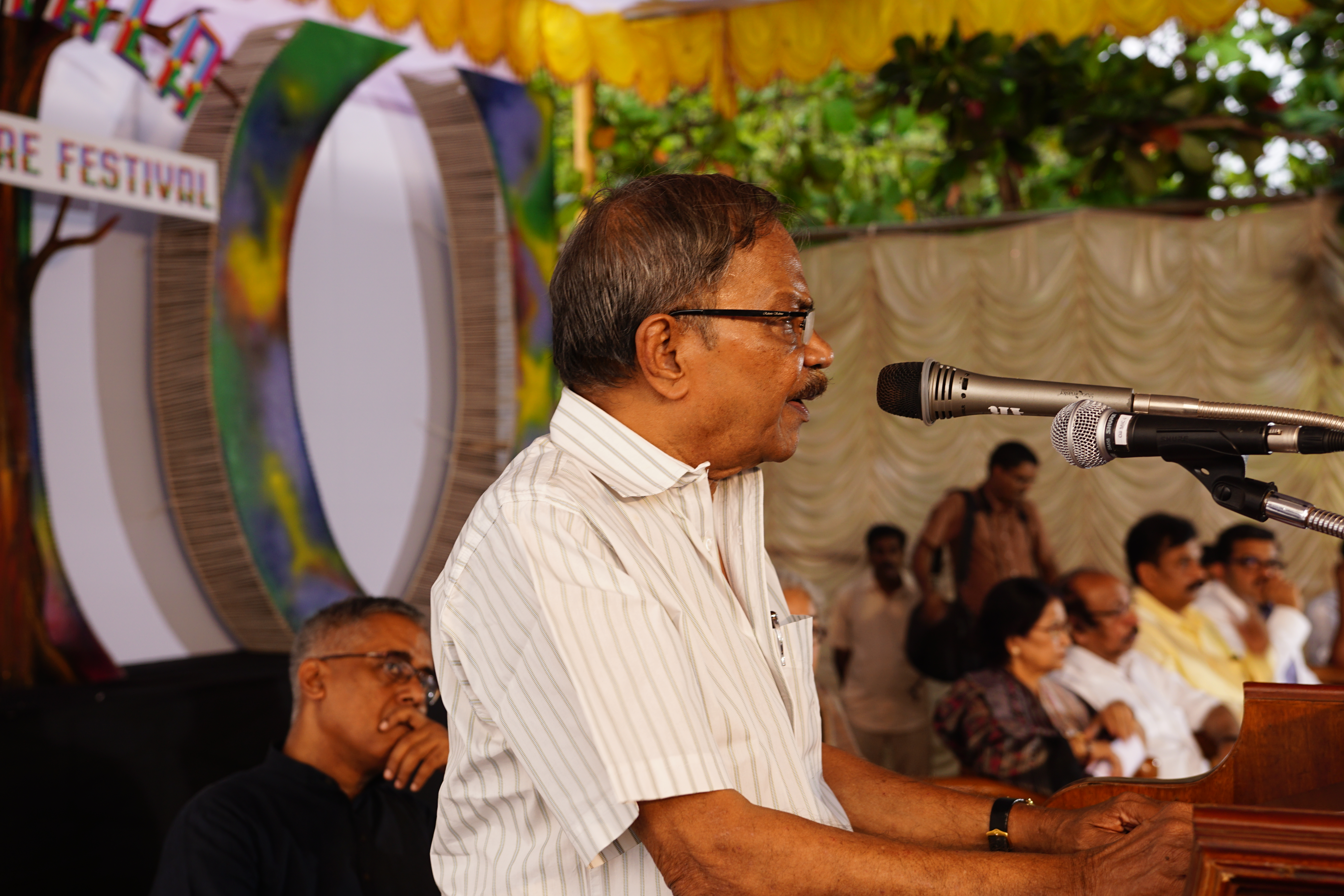
M T Vasudevan Nair at KLF 2016

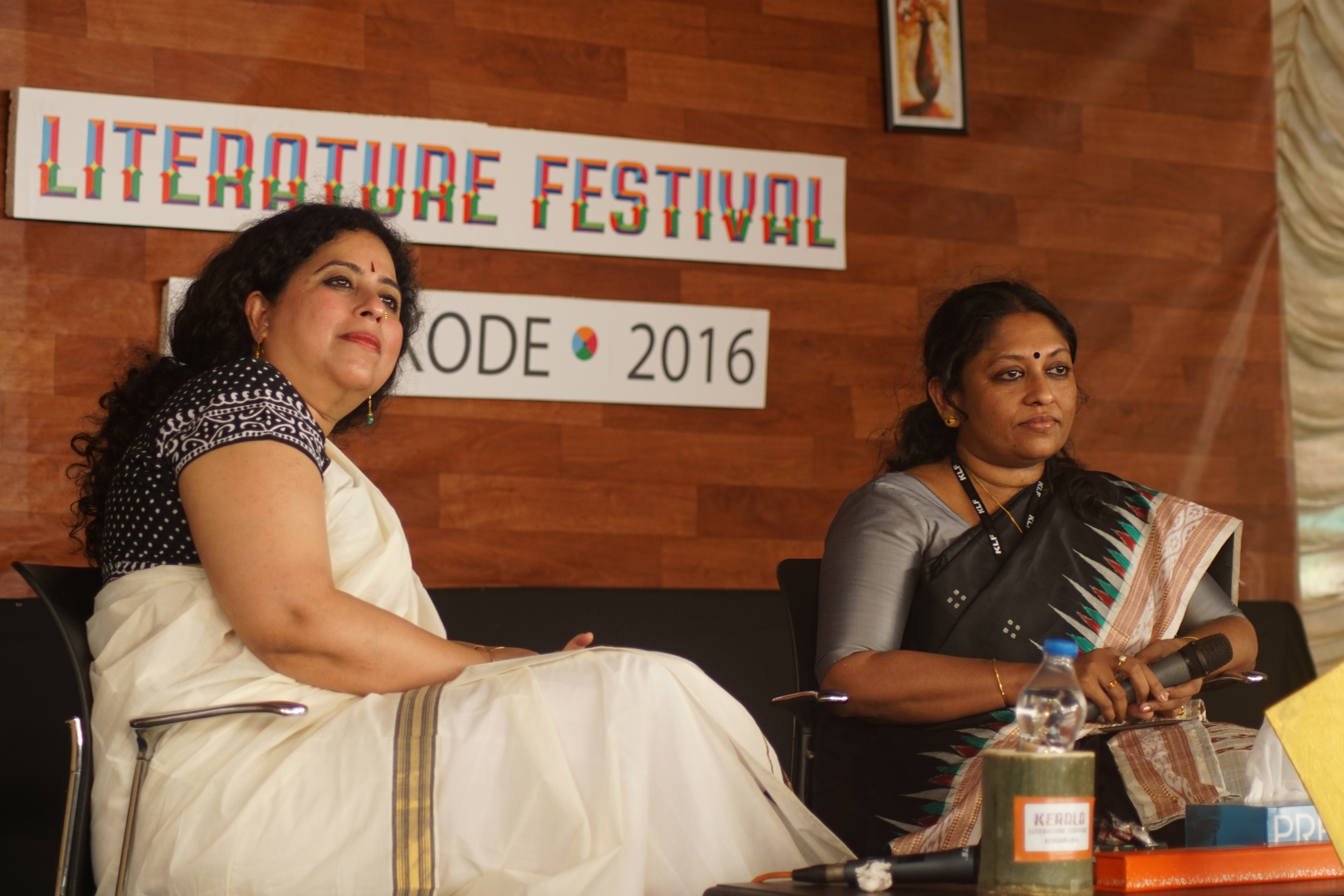
Anita Nair and K R Meera at KLF 2016
