= Peerumedu taluk =

Tehsil in Kerala, India

Peerumedu taluk Peerumade
- Taluk
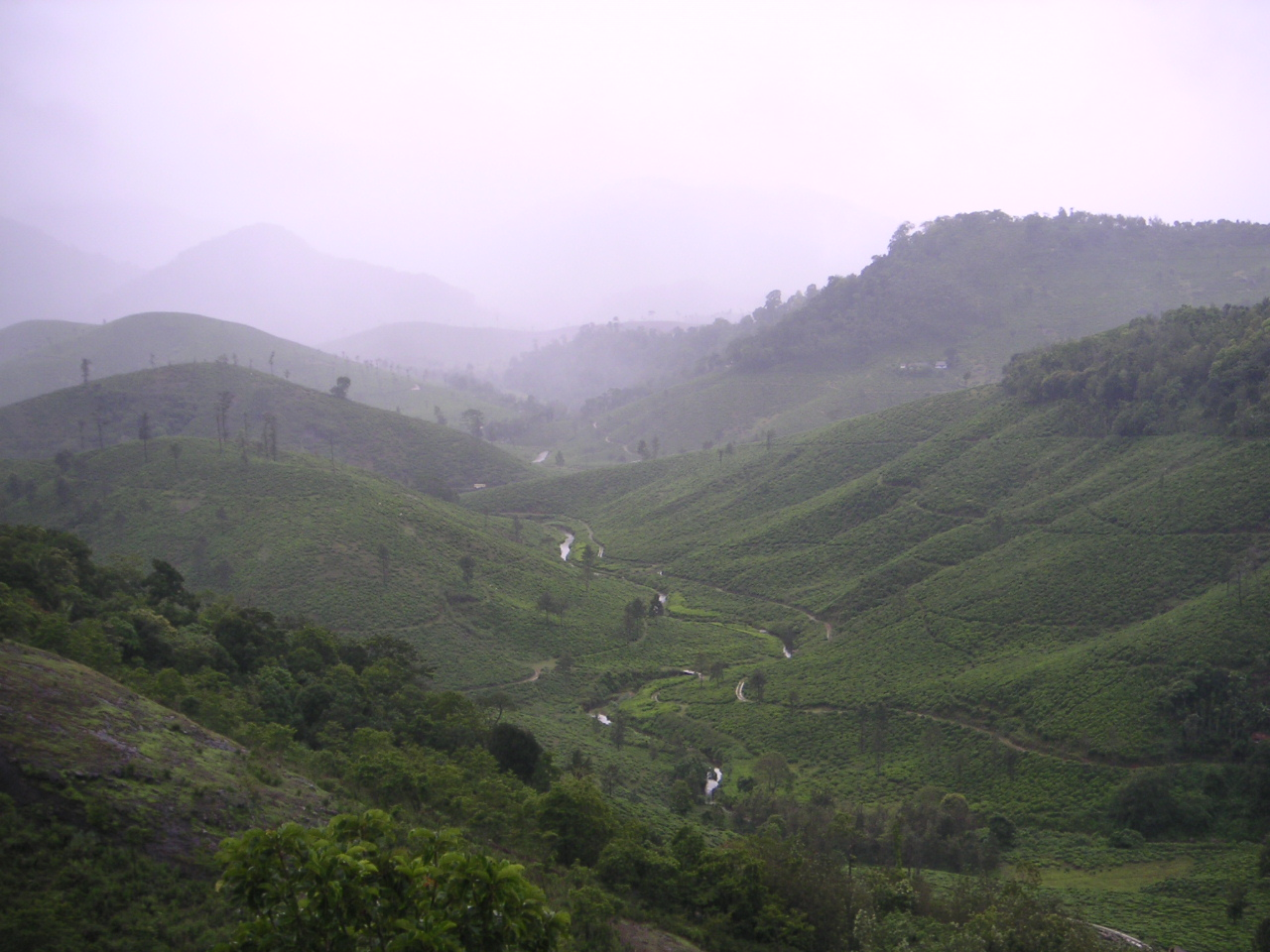
- Geography of Peerumedu

- Location in Kerala, India Peerumedu taluk (India)
- Coordinates: 9.5783°N 77.0154°E
- Country: India
- State: Kerala
- District: Idukki

Area
  - Total: 1,402.62 km^{2} (541.55 sq mi)

Population
  - Total: 175,622
  - Density: 125.210/km^{2} (324.292/sq mi)

Languages
  - Official: Malayalam, English
  - Minority: Tamil
- Time zone: UTC+5:30 (IST)
- PIN: 685531
- Telephone code: 04869
- Vehicle registration: KL 37
- Lok Sabha constituency: Idukki
- Vidhan Sabha constituency: Peerumade

Peerumedu taluk is one of the 5 taluks in Idukki district in the Indian state of Kerala. It consists of 10 revenue villages.

== Constituent Villages ==
The 10 villages of the Peerumedu taluk are: Elappara, Kokkayar, Kumily, Manjumala, Mlappara, Peerumedu, Periyar, Peruvanthanam, Upputhara and Vagamon.

== Demographics ==
As per 2011 census report, Peerumedu taluk has population of 175,622 of which 87,391 are males and 88,231 are females. The sex-ratio of Peerumedu taluk is around 1010 compared to 1084 which is average of Kerala state. The literacy rate of Peerumade Taluk is 81.33% out of which 84.72% males are literate and 77.98% females are literate.

=== Languages ===
Malayalam is the most widely spoken language in Peerumedu taluk, followed by Tamil and others.

Languages in Peerumedu taluk
Language	Speakers
Malayalam	65.35%
Tamil	34.34%
Others	0.29%
Distribution of languages Source: 2011 Census

=== Religions ===
The majority of people in Peerumedu taluk are Hindus and Christians, followed by Muslims and other minorities.

Religions in Peerumedu subdistrict
1. Hinduism (51.5%)
2. Christianity (41.3%)
3. Islam (6.91%)
4. Buddhism (0.03%)
5. Not stated (0.23%)
6. Sikh (0.01%)
7. Jainism (0.01%)
8. Other (0.04%)
