= Kizhakemuri =

Kizhakemuri may refer to:

- D. C. Kizhakemuri (1914–1999), Indian writer
- DC Kizhakemuri Foundation, foundation
