= Mlappara =

- village
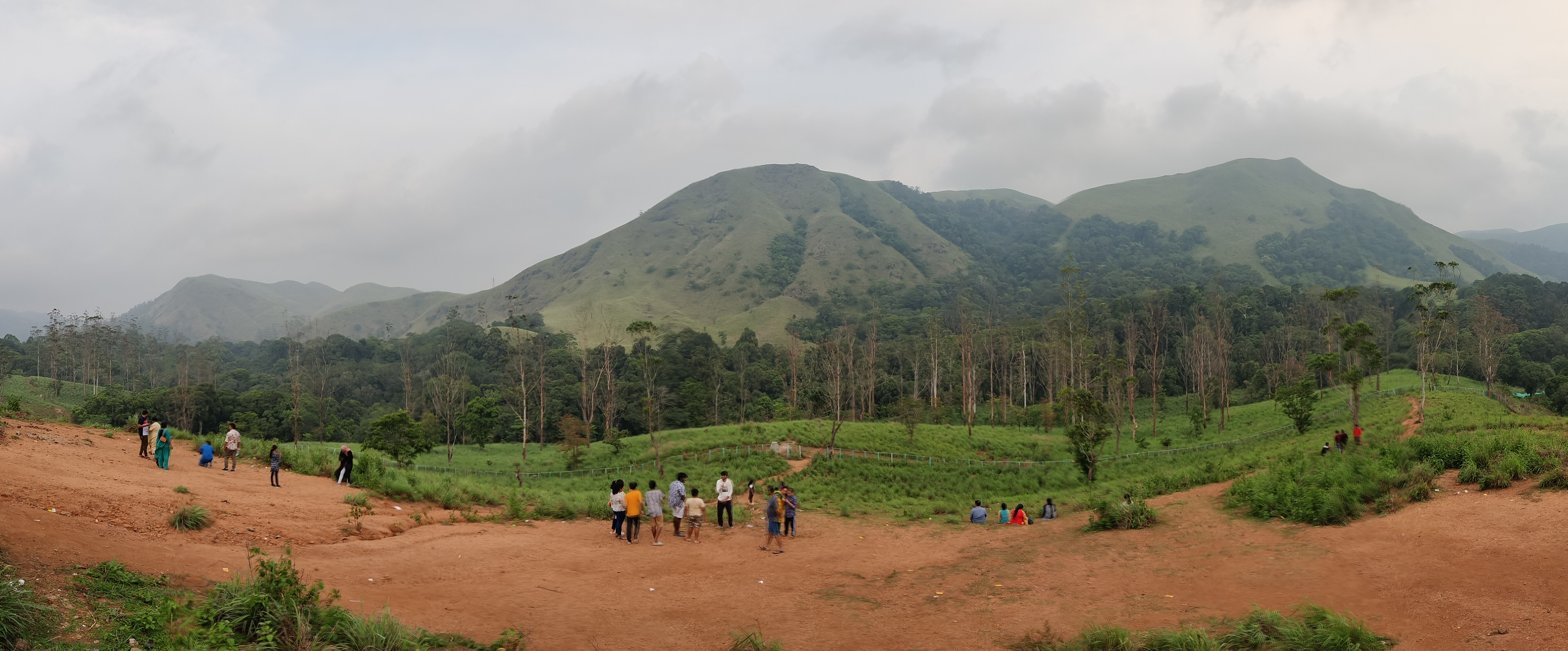
- Mountains of Mlappara. Taken near Sathram Airstrip

- Location in Kerala, India
- Coordinates: 9.4673°N 77.2643°E
- Country: India
- State: Kerala
- District: Idukki
- Taluk: Peerumedu

Area
  - Total: 549.4 km^{2} (212.1 sq mi)

Population (2011)
  - Total: 1,129
  - Density: 2.055/km^{2} (5.322/sq mi)

Languages
  - Official: Malayalam, English
- Time zone: UTC+5:30 (IST)
- PIN: 6XXXXX
- Vehicle registration: KL-37

Mlappara is a village in Idukki district in the state of Kerala, in southwestern India.

== Demographics ==
At the 2011 census, Mlappara had a population of 1,129 (535 males and 594 females). It has a large geographical area of 549.4 km^{2} (212.1 sq mi) with 314 families residing there. 9.4% of the population was under six years of age. The literacy rate of 90.8% higher was than the national average of 74% and below than state average of 94%.
