= Vagamon Glass Bridge =

Bridge in Kerala, India

Vagamon Glass Bridge വാഗമൺ ചില്ലു പാലം
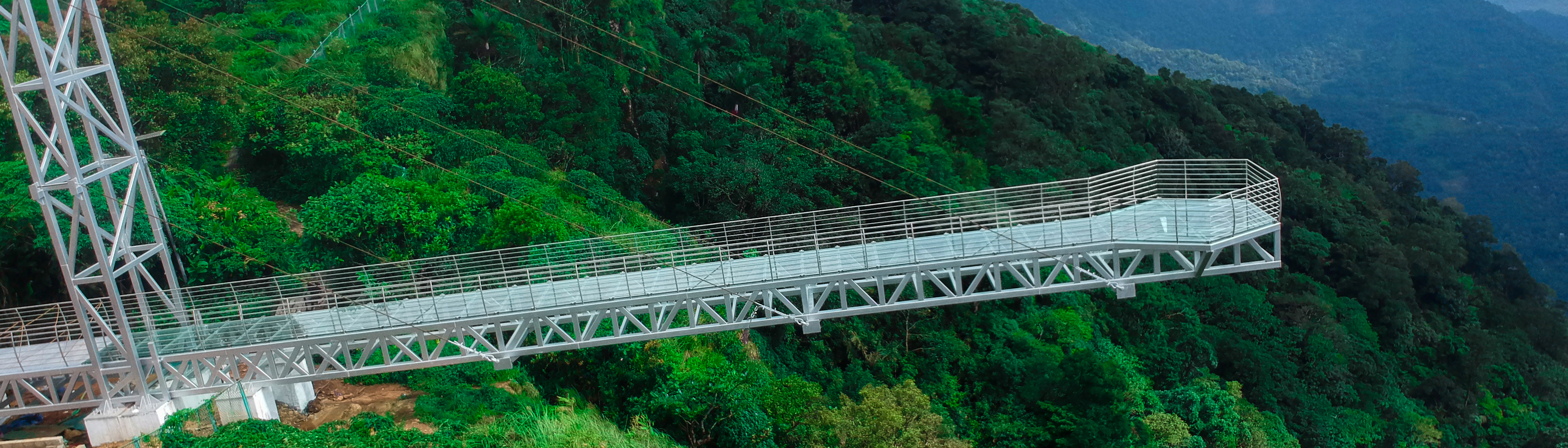
- Locale: Kolahalamedu, Vagamon, Idukki district Kerala, India

Characteristics
- Design: Cantilever glass skywalk
- Material: Laminated glass and structural steel
- Total length: 40 meters

History
- Engineering design by: WVA Consulting Engineers Pvt Ltd
- Construction end: 2023
- Construction cost: ₹3 crores
- Opened: 6 September 2023

The Vagamon Glass Bridge is a cantilever skywalk glass bridge in Vagamon, Kerala, India. With a length of 40 metres, the bridge is the longest cantilever glass bridge in Idukki District. It was built at the Idukki District Tourism Promotion Councils (DTPC) adventure park with the initiative of DTPC under PPP model with Bharat Mata Ventures Pvt ltd and Capture dayz Pvt Ltd . It was opened to public on 6 September 2023.

== Overview ==
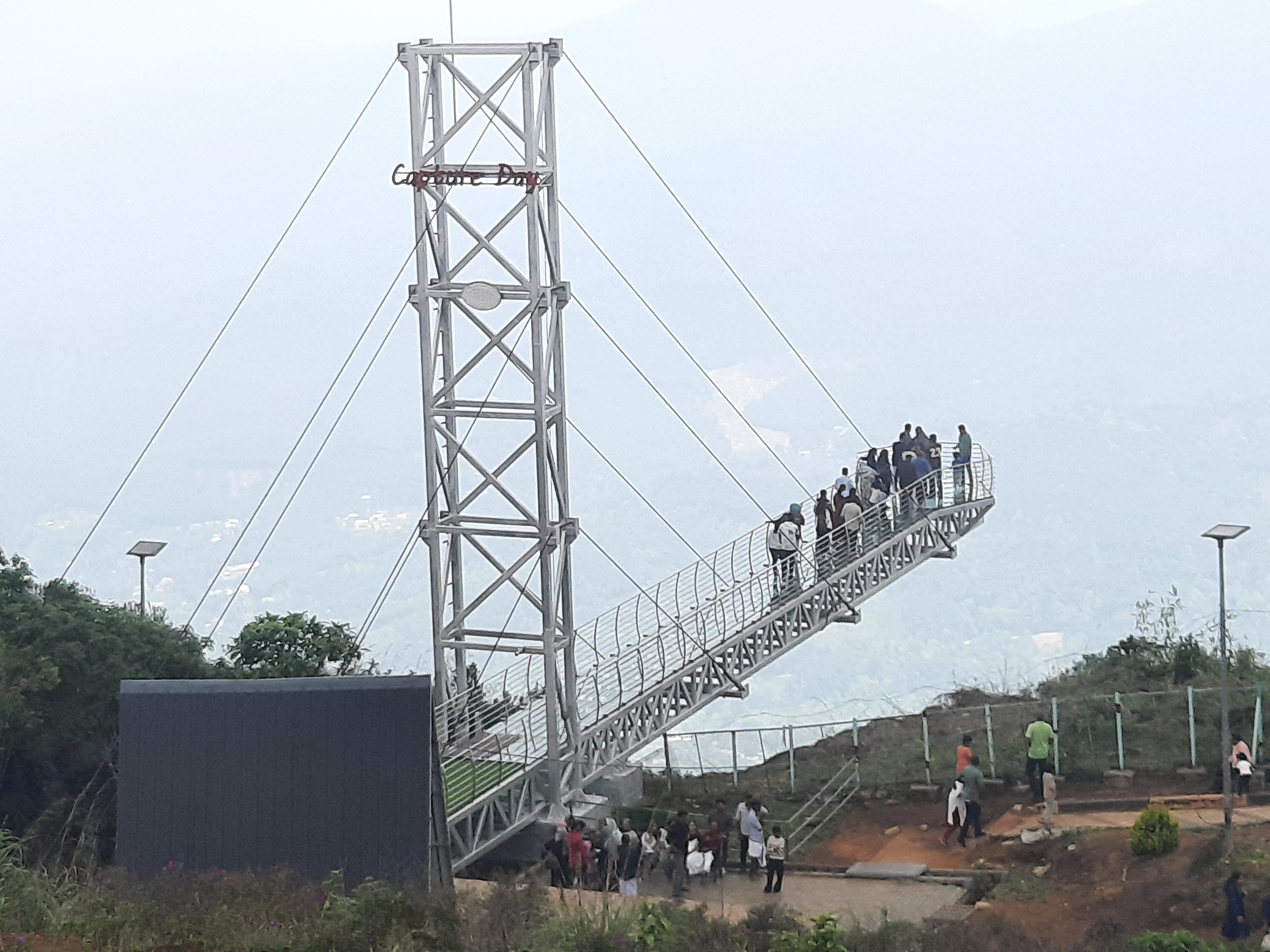
Vagamon Glass Bridge

The Vagamon glass bridge is the first glass bridge in Kerala. It is made of five layers of 40mm glass that was imported from Germany, and 35 tonnes of steel support the entire glass construction. The steel pillars on the mountain's summit are joined by six metal cables that support the bridge. The bridge has been designed and constructed with a private partnership under the Idukki DTPC. It was completed at a cost of ₹3 crores (₹30,000,000) and was opened to public on 25 August 2023. From here, the distant view of places like Koottikkal, Kokkayar, Mundakkayam can be seen.

=== Structural engineering ===
The Vagamon Glass Bridge is configured as a single-span cantilever skywalk projecting about 40 metres from the hillside at Kolahalamedu. The superstructure consists of a welded structural-steel framework supporting multiple laminated tempered glass panels; about 35 tonnes of steel are used in the supporting members, while the deck glazing is formed by five layers of glass, each approximately 40 mm thick, imported from Germany.

The cantilevered deck is anchored to steel pillars founded on the hilltop, and the outer end of the bridge is stabilised by a system of six metal cables that connect back to the supporting columns on the summit. These cables provide additional restraint against uplift and lateral movement under wind and pedestrian loading, supplementing the stiffness of the steel frame and foundations.

== See also ==
- List of Glass Bridge Skywalks in India
- Jatayu Earth's Center Nature Park
- Kerala Tourism
