= Kerala Adventure Carnival =

Annual festival in Kerala, India

Kerala Adventure Carnival is the yearly adventure festival held in Kerala, India. Kerala Adventure Carnival is organized by Kerala Tourism and the Youth Welfare Board. The adventure festival takes place at Vagamon, a hill station in Kerala. The event lasts for 10 days and includes paragliding, paramotoring, off-road jeep riding, and a cycling competition. In 2009, it received the award for the Most Innovative Tourism event, from Kerala Tourism.
