= DC Kizhakemuri Foundation =

Indian foundation

- Abbreviation: DCKF
- Formation: 2001; 25 years ago
- Type: Literary Foundation
- Headquarters: Kottayam
- Location: Kerala
- Official language: Malayalam

DC Kizhakemuri Foundation (DCKF), conceived in 2001 under the Travancore Cochin Legislation of 1957, is formed as a tribute to the late D. C. Kizhakemuri, founder of DC Books. The DC Kizhakemuri Foundation organises a wide range of art, education and cultural activities.

DC Kizhakemuri Foundation also conducts annual literary festival, Kerala Literature Festival (KLF), with support from various writers and other organisations. DCKF always strives to achieve the principles by which D. C. Kizhakemuri lived. The foundation runs DC School of Management and Technology (DCSMAT) and DC School of Architecture and Design, which has campuses in Vagamon and Thiruvananthapuram. The institutions provides courses such as Master of Business Administration (MBA), Bachelor of Architecture (B.Arch), Bachelor of Commerce (B.Com), Bachelor of Business Administration (BBA), Bachelor of Fine Arts, Bachelor of Arts in Interior Design (BA Interior Design), Certified Management Accountant (CMA) and Association of Chartered Certified Accountants (ACCA).

Radio DC 90.4 MHz Community FM, managed by the DCSMAT, is a non-commercial community radio station located in Trivandrum, Kerala. Radio DC is the first Internet radio to be started in an Indian Business School and first private Community Radio Station in Kerala. Radio DC started its function on 6 January 2005 and approved by the Ministry of Information and Broadcasting, Government of India.

== Scholarships ==
DC Kizhakemuri Foundation gives scholarships in the form of 100 per cent tuition fee waiver for dependent children of serving defense and paramilitary personnel, ex- servicemen, Tibetan and Sri Lankan refugee students and students from Jammu and Kashmir.

== The inspiration ==
D. C. Kizhakemuri was a freedom fighter, visionary, thinker, writer and publisher who left an indelible mark in the modern literary history of Kerala. D. C. Kizhakemuri started his career as a teacher and was also the first columnist in Malayalam. He was awarded Padma Bhushan in 1999. He was involved in starting a library in Kanjirapally in 1942 and this passion continued throughout his lifetime. This led to the beginning of Kerala Library Movement in 1945 initiated by P. N. Panicker which successfully resulted in building over 8,000 rural libraries and reading rooms in Kerala.
