= Radio DC =

- Thiruvananthapuram; India
- Broadcast area: Thiruvananthapuram City Area
- Frequency: 90.4 MHz
- Branding: Radio DC 90.4

Programming
- Language: Malayalam

Ownership
- Owner: DCSMAT Media School

Links
- Webcast: Listen Live
- Website: The official Radio DC website

Radio DC is a non-commercial community radio administered by the DC School of Management and Technology (DCSMAT). It is the first private FM (frequency modulated) community radio station in Kerala. It is located in KINFRA Film and Video Park, Thiruvananthapuram, Kerala, India. It broadcasts at 90.4 MHz. All the operations in the radio station are managed by the students of DCSMAT with support from the faculty.
