= DC School of Management and Technology =

Technical school in Kerala, India

- Type: Private
- Affiliations: Mahatma Gandhi University (Vagamon campus), Kerala University (Trivandrum campus)
- Location: Vagamon, Kerala, India; 9.7343°N 76.8750°E
- Campus: Vagamon
- Language: English
- Website: http://dcsmat.com/
- Location within Kerala Location within India

DC School of Management and Technology (DCSMAT) is an Indian management institution with campuses located in Thiruvananthapuram and Vagamon, Kerala, India. The DCSMAT group of institutions are promoted by DC Kizhakemuri Foundation (DCKF) and DC Books. The campus in Vagamon is affiliated with Mahatma Gandhi University while the Thiruvananthapuram campus is affiliated with Kerala University. DSCMAT is a National Assessment and Accreditation Council (NAAC), 'A' grade accredited institution approved by All India Council for Technical Education (AICTE) and holds ISO 9001-2000 certification from TUV SUD.

== History ==
The first campus of DCSMAT was established in 2002 in Vagamon and Thiruvananthapuram campus was started in 2006. The institution incorporates a fully residential 'Gurukulam' model of education where faculty and students live and work together. The School offers platform to students to sharpen their event management skills, team building and interpersonal skills through various clubs which address the varied interests of students. DCSMAT follows the case methodology of teaching, as is being practiced in institutions like IIMs and Harvard Business School. In May 2008, DCSMAT Research Centre was started with an aim of attracting research guides, PhD students and Post-Doctoral fellows in management and related fields. DCSMAT is ranked one among the Top-3 private Business schools in Kerala and among the Top-23 in All India private B-Schools category by Competition Success Review 2016 Survey.

== DC School of Architecture and Design ==
DC School of Architecture and Design is an architecture and design institution, affiliated to Mahatma Gandhi University, located at the DCSMAT campus in Vagamon. It is also affiliated to APJ Abdul Kalam Technological University, Kerala located at DCSMAT campus in Trivandrum KINFRA Park. The Centre for Tropical Architecture is headed by architect TM Cyriac of Environmental Creations, along with eminent researchers and academicians. The school's Kerala Architecture Festival in 2021, National Association for Student Architects (NASA) event in 2018 and 72-hour workshop launched in 2015 has gained immense popularity with architecture schools from across India and globally. The workshop is usually held every year in January. It is organized in partnership with NASA and is a pan-India event. Courses offered here are Bachelor of Architecture (BArch) and Bachelor of Arts in Interior Design (BA Interior Design).

== Governing council ==
Dr. Beena George, MBA, PhD, Dean, Cameroon School of Business (University of St. Thomas, Houston) is the chairman and Dr M S Valiathan, a cardiac surgeon and former president of the Indian National Science Academy, is the vice-chairman of the governing council. Ravi Deecee, CEO of DC Books, is the Chief Facilitator.

The other members are
Balagopal C (ex IAS), Jose Dominic FCA, Murali Gopalan, Arun M Kumar, George P Varghese, Mathew J Manimala, Prof. Omchery N. N. Pillai, T T Thomas, Prof. Abraham Koshy, Prof. (Dr) P R Poduval, K X M John, Sam Santhosh, Shaffi Mather, Harikrishnan R. Nair, Brigadier M C Ashok Kumar (Retd.).

== Management festivals ==
DCSMAT Vagamon campus organizes the annual management festival, Luminance, which is fully managed by students under the guidance Computer Application DCSMAT Trivandrum campus also has its own management festival called Juventus, started in 2015. Juventus 2k16, in 2016, saw an active participation of colleges from across Kerala and other south Indian states. The chief guest of 2016 was John Brittas, the managing director of Kairali TV.

== Facilities ==
Infrastructure Vagamon campus is a township spread across 32 acres (12.95 ha) in 26 buildings with 5,00000 square feet built up area and hostel facility for 800 plus students to bring in a real campus culture. Trivandrum campus is set amidst the 72 acre KINFRA Film and Video Park, Kazhakuttom which also is a shooting locale. Both the campuses incorporate state of the art ultra-modern buildings with 24 × 7 high speed Wi-Fi, CCTV coverage, high end computer and other labs and digital classrooms.

Intellectual capital DCSMAT intellectual capital consist Indian Institute of Management (IIM) trained and All India Management Association (AIMA) accredited faculty having extensive industrial exposure, with many of them being doctorates.

Mentoring Student Ownership Programme (SOP) is a mentoring programme under which small group of students are assigned to a faculty for mentoring and enabling their overall development.

Residential Campus Vagamon is a fully residential college to encourage participatory learning in a real residential campus culture. The campus is a self-contained township, housing all recreational facilities, gymnasium, cafeteria, coffee shop, mini supermarket, bank and ATM, amphitheater and medical facilities.

Club Activities Participation in club activities is compulsory for DCSMAT students with a choice of 14 very active clubs.

Guests DCSMAT students have an opportunity to frequently interact with guests and faculty; Taslima Nasrin and Gopi Kallayil being a few among them.
