= Kokkayar =

- village
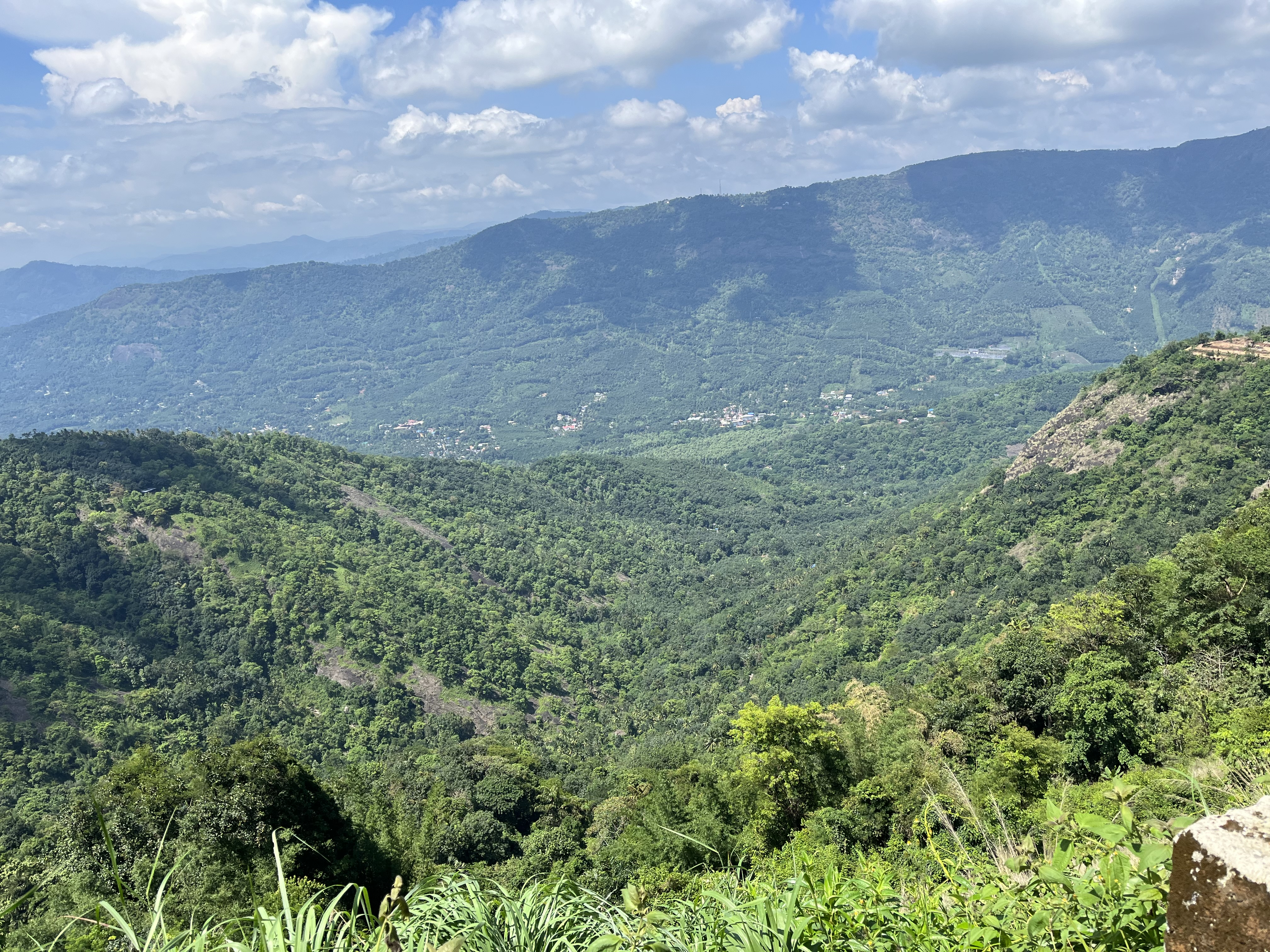
- Kokkayar as seen from Vagamon

- Location in Kerala, India Kokkayar (India)
- Coordinates: 9°34′0″N 76°53′0″E
- Country: India
- State: Kerala
- District: Idukki

Government
  - Type: Panchayath
  - Body: Kokkayar grama panchayath

Area
  - Total: 55.91 km^{2} (21.59 sq mi)

Population (2001)
  - Total: 12,876
  - Density: 230.3/km^{2} (596.5/sq mi)

Languages
  - Official: Malayalam, English
- Time zone: UTC+5:30 (IST)
- PIN: 686514
- Area code: 04869
- Vehicle registration: KL-37, KL-34
- Coastline: 0 kilometres (0 mi)
- Nearest city: Mundakayam

Kokkayar is a village in Azhutha block of Peerumedu taluk in Idukki district, in the Indian state of Kerala. It is surrounded by Koottikkal, Elappara panchayaths in north, Peerumedu and Elappara panchayaths in east, Peruvanthanam in south and Koottikkal, Mundakkayam panchayaths in west.

== Administration ==
The panchayath of Kokkayar is divided into 13 wards for administrative convenience.

=== Wards ===
- Mukkulam
- Vadakke mala
- Meloram
- Mulamkunnu
- Kodikuthy
- Boyce
- Kokkayar
- Poovanchi
- Narakampuzha
- Kutti plangadu
- Vembly
- Kanaka puram
- Yendayar east

== Demographics ==
As of 2011 India census, Kokkayar had a population of 3057 households.
