= Mango Books =

MangoBooks
- Parent company: DC Books
- Founded: 2007
- Country of origin: India
- Headquarters location: Ernakulam, Kerala; India
- Publication types: Books
- Nonfiction topics: Fiction, children's literature, poetry, reference, classics, folktales, biographies
- Official website: www.dcbooks.com/mango

MangoBooks is a children's imprint in English of DC Books. They publish fiction, children's literature, poetry, reference, classics, folktales and biographies. Mango has also licensed content to Real Reads, UK.

The Mango Editorial office is located in Ernakulam, Kerala, India. Mango has a four-member editorial team with Saraswathy Rajagopalan as its executive editor.

== History and overview ==
Originally called Tumbi, the company was founded in 2007, taking on the name MangoBooks in October 2008. In 2014, Mango launched a new series titled Spooky Stories which included The Girl in the Mirror, As Strange as it Gets, Stories to Scare, Whispers from Under the Bed and Ghost Stories from Bengal and Beyond.

The Mango Classics edition of Ramayana sold record copies worldwide. Titles from Mango from the series Mango Classics, Folktales and Collected Stories include classics such as Hamlet, Emma, The Time Machine, The Tempest, Great Expectations, Tom Sawyer, Dracula, Frankenstein, A Christmas Carol, Macbeth, Wuthering Heights, Pride and Prejudice, Romeo and Juliet, The Hound of the Baskervilles and The Lost World. Among the classics, there are also tales from Indian mythology, including Karna and Krishna, as well as tales from Indian history including Rani Lakshmibai, Shivaji and Ashoka. The collected tales of Panchatantra and Jataka Tales have received positive reviews. Mango publishes its own yearbook every year, which is a reference book to meet the academic requirements of students.

Mango also has an original textbook series for schools, The English Express: A Skill-based Interactive Series for developing English language skills in children, as well encouraging their creativity, and communication and social skills. The lessons, exercises, illustrations and design in the course are for classes 1 to 8.

== Notable contributors ==
Acclaimed authors such as Anita Nair, Jaishree Misra, Anjana Vaswani and Nandini Nayar have worked with Mango, as well as creative artists and visual story-tellers like K.R. Raji, Lavanya Karthik and Aniruddha Mukherjee.

== Awards and recognition ==
The Talking Handkerchief written by Mumbai-based author Anjana Vaswani won the Sharjah International Children's Book Award at the Sharjah International Book Fair 2016.
