= Nitya Kallivayalil =

Indian-American near-field cosmologist

Nitya Jacob Kallivayalil is an Indian and American astrophysicist and cosmologist whose research concerns the observable effects of cosmological structure such as cold dark matter and dark energy at the "near field" scale of the Local Group of galaxies. She is a professor of astronomy and Dean's Research Fellow at the University of Virginia.

== Education and career ==
Kallivayalil is originally from Peruvanthanam, in southwestern India. After an International Baccalaureate, she graduated summa cum laude from Mount Holyoke College, with a bachelor's degree in physics, in 2001. She continued her studies at Harvard University, where she completed her Ph.D. in 2007. Her dissertation, The motions of the Magellanic Clouds and the nature of galactic dark matter, was jointly supervised by Charles R. Alcock and Roeland van der Marel.

After postdoctoral research as a Pappalardo Fellow at the Massachusetts Institute of Technology and as a YCAA Prize Fellow at Yale University, she became an assistant professor of astronomy at the University of Virginia in 2013. She was promoted to associate professor in 2019, named Dean's Research Fellow in 2023, and promoted to full professor in 2024.

== Recognition ==
Kallivayalil was a 2019 recipient of the Presidential Early Career Award for Scientists and Engineers.
