= Sathram Airstrip =

Sathram Airstrip സത്രം എയർസ്ട്രിപ്പ്
- IATA: none; ICAO: none

Summary
- Airport type: Public / Military
- Owner: Government of Kerala
- Operator: Kerala Revenue Department / NCC
- Serves: Vandiperiyar, Idukki district
- Location: Sathram, Kerala, India
- Coordinates: 9°31′19″N 077°05′46″E
- Interactive map of Sathram Airstrip
- Sources: Kerala Revenue Department, NCC, media reports

Sathram Airstrip is a small training airstrip located in Idukki, Kerala, India, developed primarily for NCC cadet aviation programs. Situated near the Periyar Tiger Reserve, the airstrip faces environmental and legal challenges but is also viewed as a potential hub for emergency response and regional air connectivity.

== History ==
In 2017, the Kerala Revenue Department allotted 12 acres of land for the Sathram Airstrip. Constructed at an estimated cost of ₹13 crore, the facility was initially designed to support NCC Air Wing training.

In July 2022, heavy rainfall triggered a landslip that damaged approximately 100 meters of the airstrip’s shoulder. Reconstruction efforts have been delayed due to opposition from the Kerala Forest Department, which claims the area is part of reserve forestland. The Kerala Public Works Department (PWD) has invited tenders for soil testing and is awaiting clearance to resume work. The Chief Minister of Kerala is monitoring the project, and a high-level meeting involving Forest and Revenue Ministers is expected to resolve the land dispute. Local residents and plantation workers have expressed frustration over delays in reconstruction and administrative bottlenecks. The lack of timely caste certificates has affected access to education and government benefits. Peerumade MLA Vazhoor Soman raised these issues in the Kerala Legislative Assembly, urging government intervention.

A successful trial landing was conducted in December 2022 using a Virus SW80 aircraft from Kochi.

In 2025, the Government of Kerala has fast-tracked airstrip projects in Idukki, Wayanad, and Kasaragod to improve regional air connectivity. A joint venture between RITES and KIIFCON is conducting feasibility studies, and ₹1.5 crore has been allocated for detailed project reports.

== Usage ==
The airstrip serves multiple roles:

- Training: National Cadet Corps (NCC) officials stated that the airstrip will serve as a training hub, with the capacity to train up to 1,000 cadets annually. There are future plans to include drone operations and licensing programs.
- Emergency Operations: Designated for use by the Indian Air Force and the District Disaster Management Authority (DDMA), especially during the Sabarimala pilgrimage season.
- Tourism and Connectivity: The Government of Kerala aims to integrate the airstrip into the UDAN regional connectivity scheme.

== Environmental and legal concerns ==
The airstrip is located approximately 600 meters from the Periyar Tiger Reserve, raising concerns about its impact on wildlife and forest ecosystems. Environmentalists have filed legal petitions, and the Kerala High Court is reviewing the project's ecological implications. The Forest Department has cited the Kerala Forest Act, 1961, which requires Union government approval for diversion of forestland.
