= Vazhoor Soman =

Indian politician (1952–2025)

Member of Kerala Legislative Assembly
- In office 24 May 2021 – 21 August 2025
- Constituency: Peerumade

Personal details
- Born: 14 September 1952 Vazhoor, Travancore–Cochin, India
- Died: 21 August 2025 (aged 72) Sasthamangalam, Thiruvananthapuram, Kerala, India
- Party: Communist Party of India
- Spouse: Bindu Soman
- Children: Adv Sobin Soman, Adv Sobith Soman
- Parent(s): Kunjupappan, Parvathy
- Profession: Politician

Vazhoor Soman (14 September 1952 – 21 August 2025) was an Indian politician from Kerala and a member of the Communist Party of India. He was a member of the Kerala Legislative Assembly from Peerumade.

== Early life and career ==
Soman came to politics through All India Students' Federation (AISF). He had held many significant positions including Idukki district panchayat welfare standing committee chairman from 2005 to 2010 and later as chairman of the Kerala State Warehousing Corporation from 2016 to 2021.

A first-time legislator, he was elected to the Kerala Legislative Assembly in the 2021 election by defeating Cyriac Thomas of Indian National Congress. He was serving as AITUC state vice-president and its national council member. Known to be close to former CPI state secretary Kanam Rajendran, Soman has been active in Kerala state politics as a trade unionist.

== Personal life and death ==
Vazhoor Soman was born on 14 September 1952, to Kunjupappan and Parvathy at Vazhoor in Kottayam. He is survived by his wife Bindu Soman and children Adv Sobin Soman and Adv Sobith Soman.

Soman suffered a massive heart attack on 21 August 2025, while returning from attending the Idukki district-level meeting of the Revenue Department in PTP Nagar, Thiruvananthapuram. He was immediately taken to the Sri Ramakrishna Ashrama Hospital in Sasthamangalam, where he was pronounced dead. Soman was 72.
