= R. V. Thomas =

Indian politician

R. V. Thomas (1899–1955) was a member of the Constituent Assembly of India and Speaker of the Travancore–Cochin Legislative Assembly. He was a prominent freedom fighter of India and noted Congress Party leader of Kerala. He was also the first municipal chairman of Palai Municipality and was a member of the first Travancore- Cochin State Public Service Commission.
