= Cyriac Thomas =

Indian academic

Cyriac Thomas (born 24 October 1943 in Pala, Kottayam) is a Member of the National Commission for Minority Educational Institutions of India He started his career as a college lecturer in Politics at St. Thomas College Pala. He served as the Vice-Chancellor of Mahatma Gandhi University, Kottayam, Kerala, India from November 2000 to November 2004. He had served as the acting Vice-Chancellor of Cochin University of Science and Technology (CUSAT). He had also served as the pro Vice-Chancellor and acting Vice-Chancellor of University of Kerala.

His father R.V. Thomas was a former speaker of the Travancore- Cochin Legislative Assembly as well as a freedom fighter. His mother Mrs. R.V. Thomas was also a freedom fighter and a social activist.

He lives in Pala in Kottayam District, Kerala.
