= Vagamon =

Hill station in Kerala, India

- Hill station
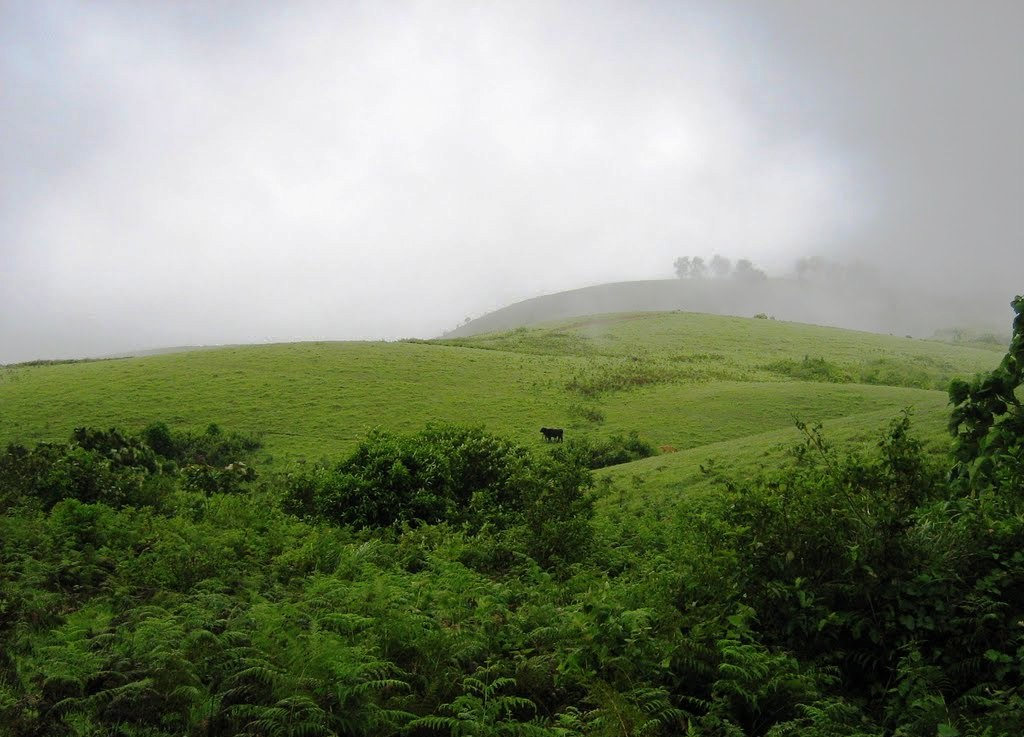
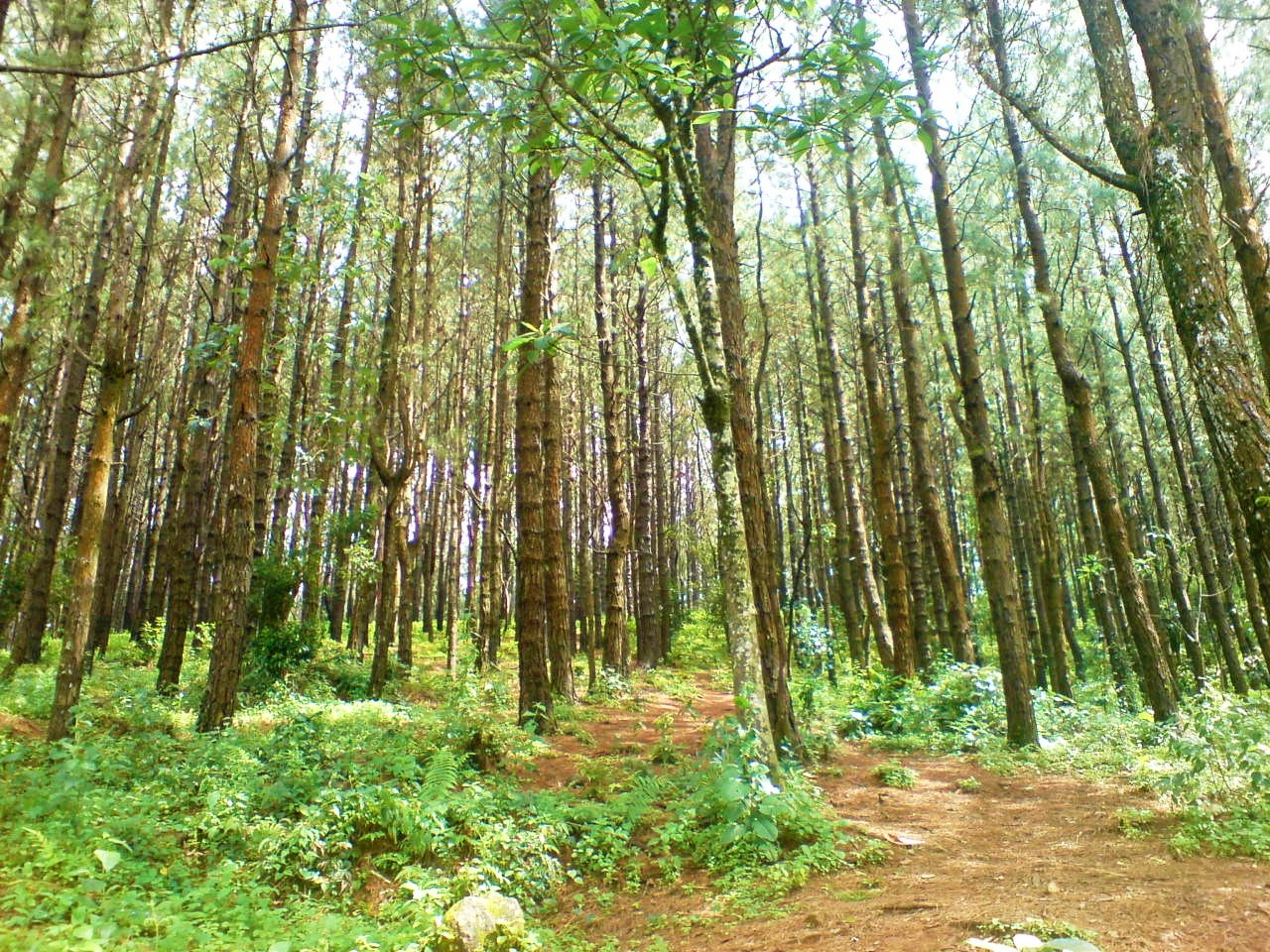
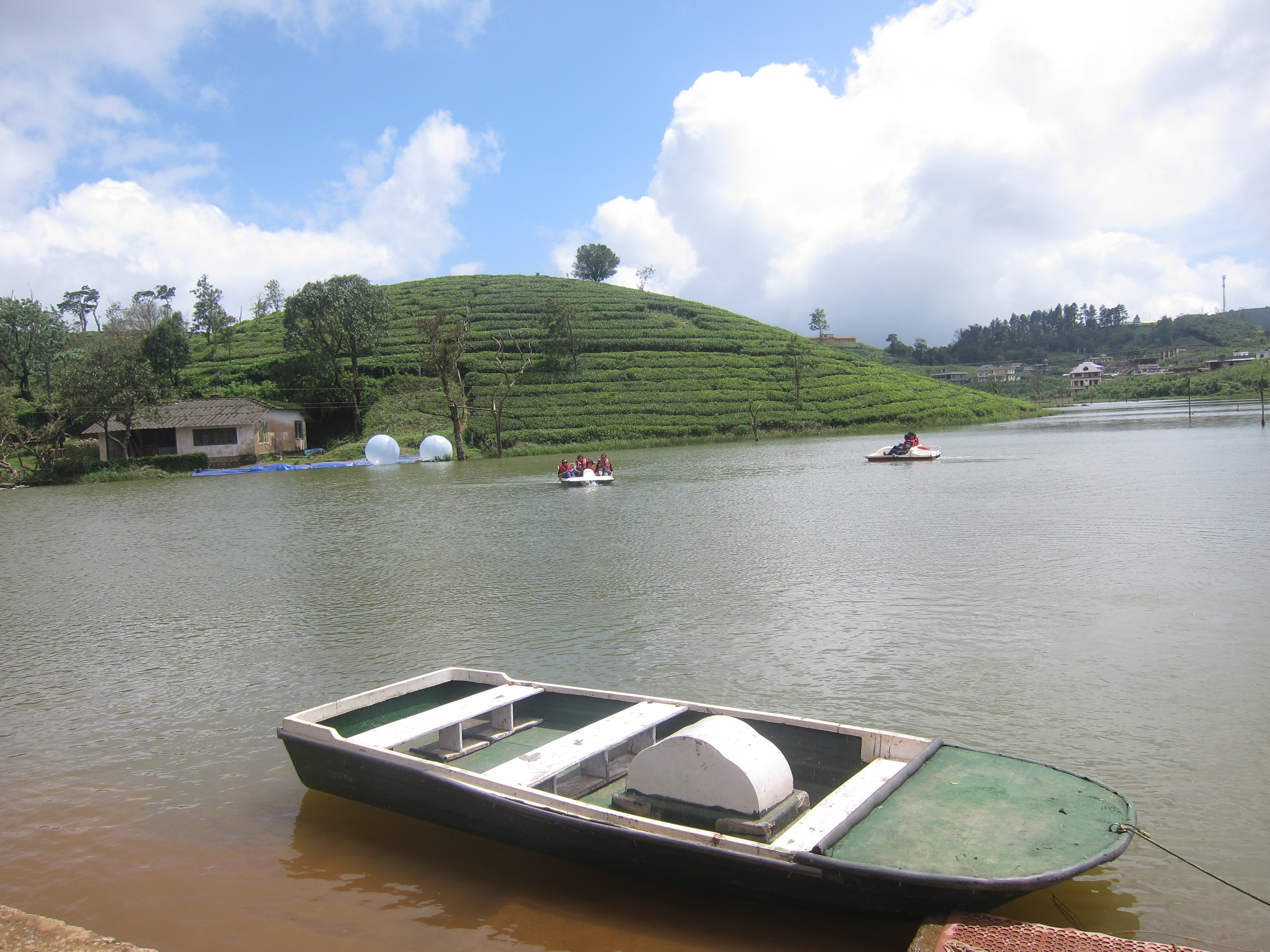
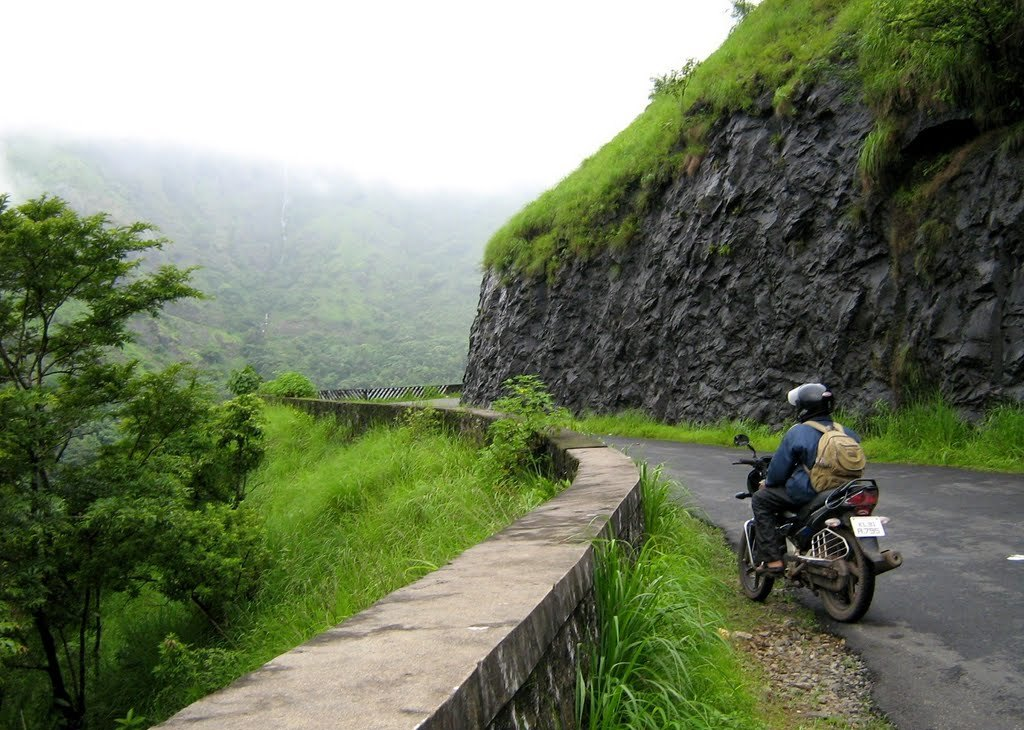
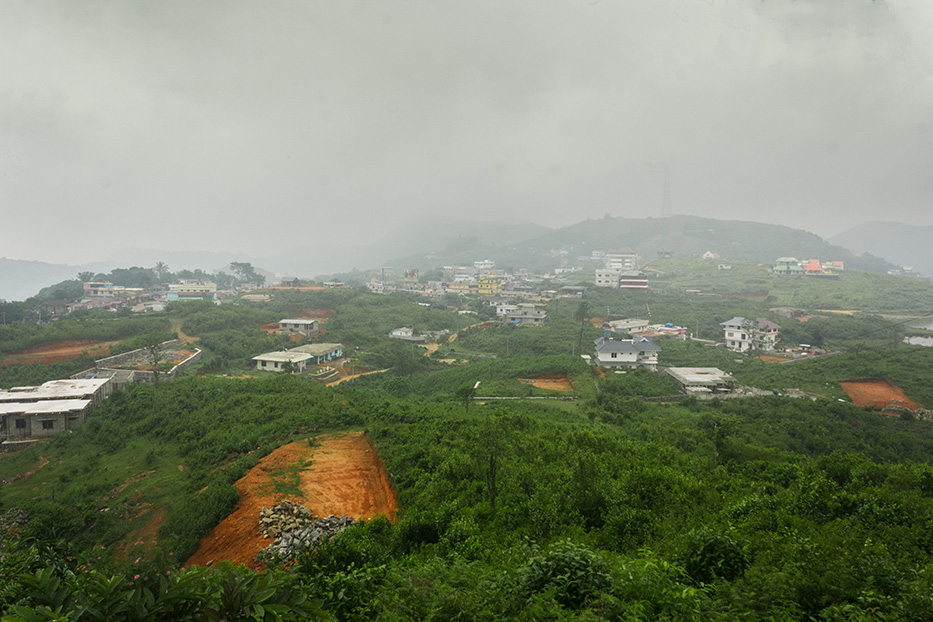
- From left to right: Vagamon meadows, Vagamon pine forest, Vagamon lake, Erattupetta - Vagamon road, Vagamon town
- Nickname: Scotland of Asia
- Location in Kerala, India Vagamon (India)
- Coordinates: 9°41′16″N 76°54′25″E
- Country: India
- State: Kerala
- District: Kottayam, Idukki
- Taluk: Peerumedu, Meenachil, Kanjirapally

Government
  - Type: Panchayat
  - Body: Elappara Grama Panchyat

Area
  - Total: 78.3 km^{2} (30.2 sq mi)
- Elevation: 1,200 m (3,900 ft)

Population (2011)
  - Total: 14,641
  - Density: 187/km^{2} (484/sq mi)

Languages
  - Official: Malayalam, English
- Time zone: UTC+5:30 (IST)
- PIN: 685503
- Vehicle registration: KL-37
- Nearest city: Erattupetta, Kattappana, Thodupuzha, Pala, Elappara
- Nearest airport: Kochi

Vagamon (Malayalam: [ʋaːɡɐmɐɳ]) is an Indian hill station and a revenue village located in Peerumedu Taluk of Idukki district, and also Meenachil taluk and Kanjirappally taluk of Kottayam district in the state of Kerala, India. Located in the Western Ghats 25 kilometres (16 mi) east of Erattupetta on the border of Kottayam-Idukki districts, Vagamon is known for its natural environment. The Vagamon glass bridge is the longest cantilever glass bridge in India.

== History ==
Vagamon remained largely unexplored for centuries. Though the British had plantations here, it was only in 1926, when Walter Duncan and Company started their tea plantations, that it became well known. In the 1930s, more tea plantations were set up in the area. After 1940, people from Travancore, and Madras (Tamil Nadu), migrated to Vagamon. Later, after the formation of Kerala State, people from various parts of Kerala migrated there.

In 1955, the Trappist monastery Kurisumala Ashram was founded in Vagamon.

In 1963,Dr. Elizabeth Baker and Architect Padma Shri Laurie Baker established a hospital and rural service centre at Kurishumala, Vagamon to serve tea-plantation workers and rural communities in the Idukki hills. Often referred to as the Mitraniketan, it is widely noted as Baker’s first project in Kerala and as an early exemplar of his cost-effective, climate-sensitive building approach using local materials.

== Geography ==
Vagamon is located in the Western Ghats at 1,100 metres (3,600 ft) above sea level. It has a cool climate with summer temperatures reaching 10–23 °C (50–73 °F)10-23 °C at midday.

Neighbouring cities & towns

== Demographics ==
As of 2011 Census, Vagamon had a population of 14,641 with 7,212 males and 7,429 females. Vagamon village has an area of 78.3 km^{2} (30.2 sq mi) with 3,816 families residing in it. The average sex ratio was 1030 lower than the state average of 1084. In Vagamon, 9% of the population was under 6 years of age. Vagamon had an average literacy of 90.9%. higher than the national average of 74%, and lower than the state average of 94%.

== Economy ==
The primary economy is ecotourism including hiking to explore the many waterfalls, rock climbing and paragliding. National Geographic Traveler has listed Vagamon in their directory of the "50 most attractive places to visit in India". In addition, many people work in as laborers in tea and coffee plantations.

== Education ==
Vagamon has two colleges: DC School of Management and Technology (DCSMAT) and DC School Of Architecture And Design, both promoted by DC Kizhakemuri Foundation and co-promoted by DC Books. One of the leading management colleges in Kerala, DCSMAT has an additional campus in Thiruvananthapuram. DCSMAT offer programs such as Master of Business Administration (MBA), Bachelor of Commerce (B.Com), Bachelor of Business Administrati (BBA), Certified Management Accountant (CMA) and Association of Chartered Certified Accountants (ACCA). DC School Of Architecture And Design provides courses such as Bachelor of Arts in Interior Design (BA Interior Design) and Bachelor of Architecture (BArch). The College of Dairy Sciences kolahalamedu Vagamon, offering courses for the B Tech Dairy Sciences, affiliated to Veterinary University.

== Issues ==
In August 2008, the Kerala Police began investigations into a training camp organized in December 2007 by the banned SIMI activists.

On 18 August 2014, two tourists from Kozhikode died in Vagamon, after lightning struck them. Others who were with them sustained minor injuries. The incident happened at around 4:30 PM when the tourists were hanging around the barren hilltops. Both fell after the lightning hit them and their clothes were burned. Though both were taken to hospital, they died by the time they arrived.

== Biodiversity ==
Vagamon, due to its elevation and climate, has a unique ecosystem, leading to the emergence of rich natural vegetation, plant species, shola forests etc. From the early 20th century plantation grew crops like tea and coffee. Vagamon hills are home to less explored flora and fauna. A diversity study conducted by Dr Pratheesh Mathew recorded 112 species of moths from 16 families under eight superfamilies and has become the prominent faunal diversity study in this area. The author also recorded sightings of many species of insects, annelids, amphibians, lizards, snakes, birds and mammals. A wide variety of flowering and non-flowering plants, including rare Cycas species, has also been noted. The ongoing faunal and floral surveys are expected to shed light on the richness of biodiversity at this location. The flourishing tourism and related developments are predicted to have a negative impact on the flora and fauna of this region.

== Culture ==
Vagamon has a rich history of religious diversity with Hindu, Christian and Muslim populations. There are several religious buildings to visit including:

- Kurisumala Ashram, Vagamon, Indian-Catholic monastery
- St Sebastian's RC Church Vagamon
- St Antony's Church Vagamon
- Emmanuel CSI Church Vagamon
- Peniel Worship Center Vagamon
- Zion worship centre BBA Church Paarakattu
- Bible Believers Assembly Kottamala 3rd DIV
- Thangal para, a Muslim pilgrimage center 5 kilometres (3.1 mi) outside of Vagamon.
- Sree Arundhathi Vasishta Temple, Vasishtagiry, Vagamon.
- Sree Subramanya Swami Temple

== Books ==
- The Story of Peermade by George Thengummoottil (ISBN 9788192888606)

== Gallery ==
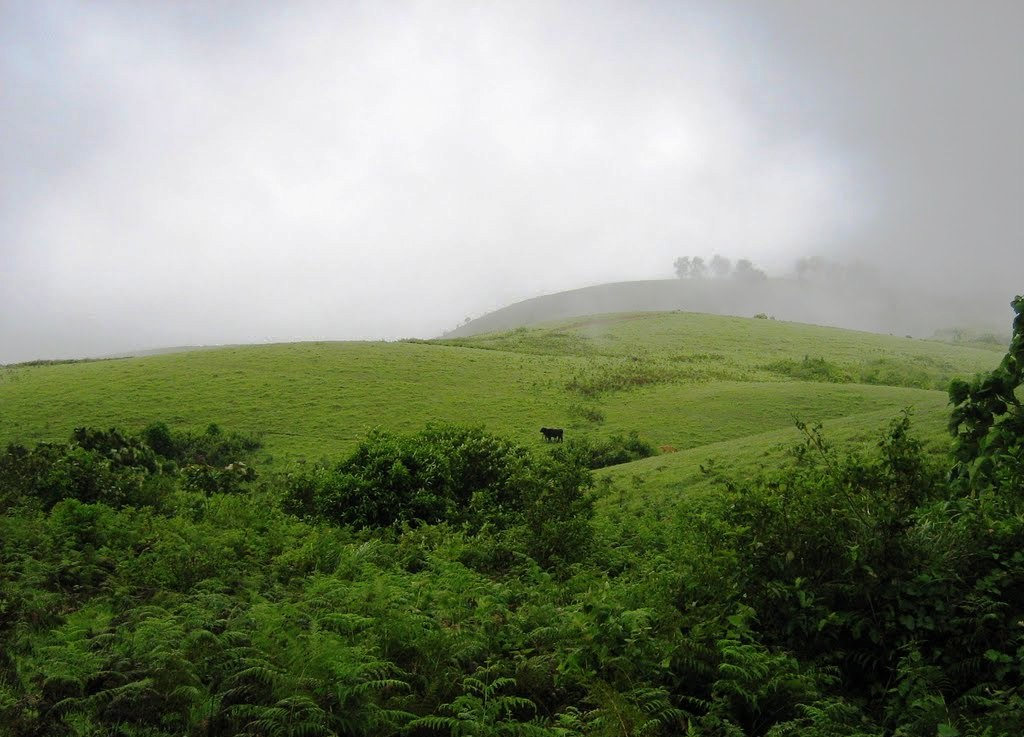
Vagamon meadows, Kerala, India

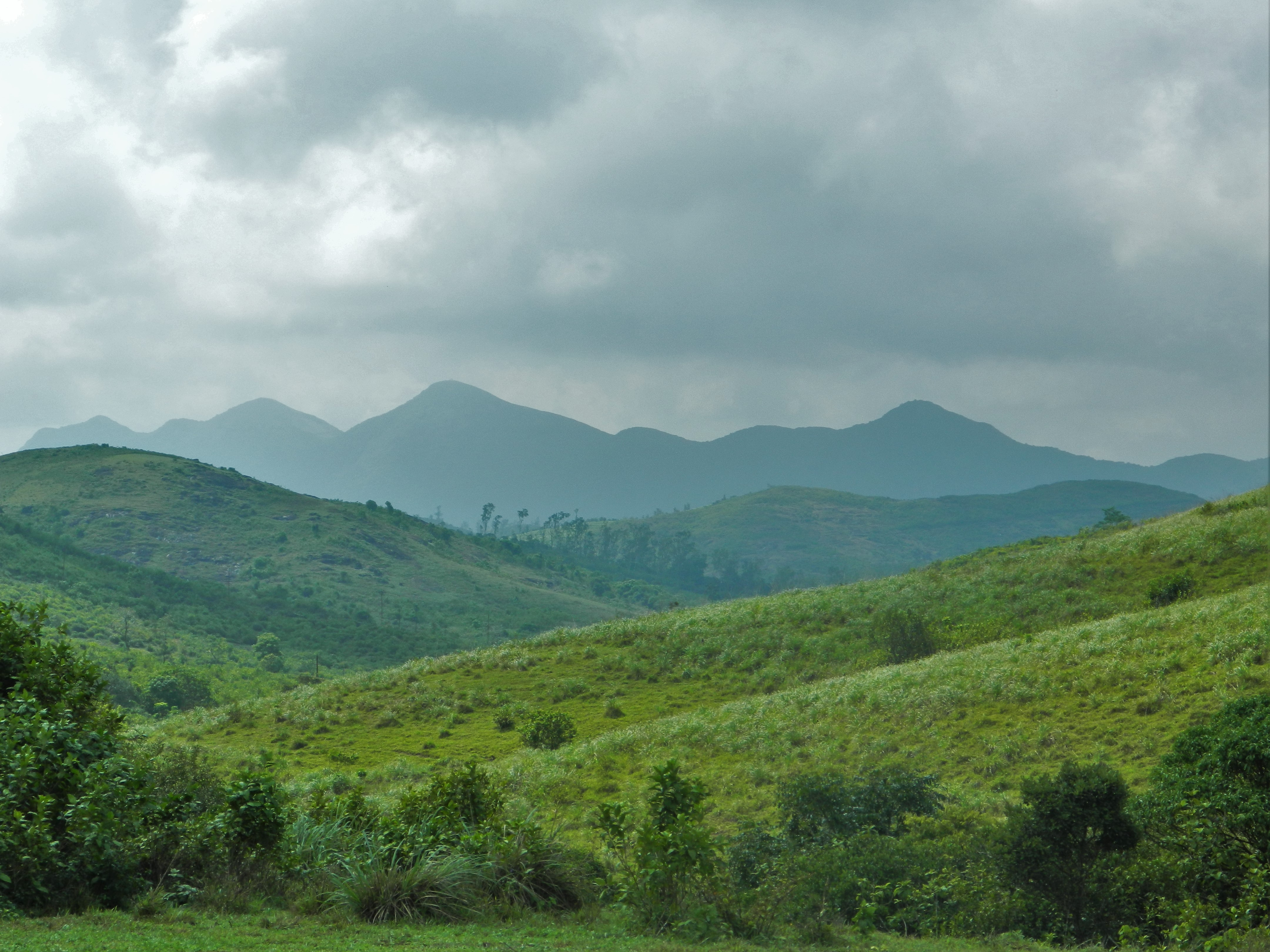
Western Ghats as seen from Vagamon View Point

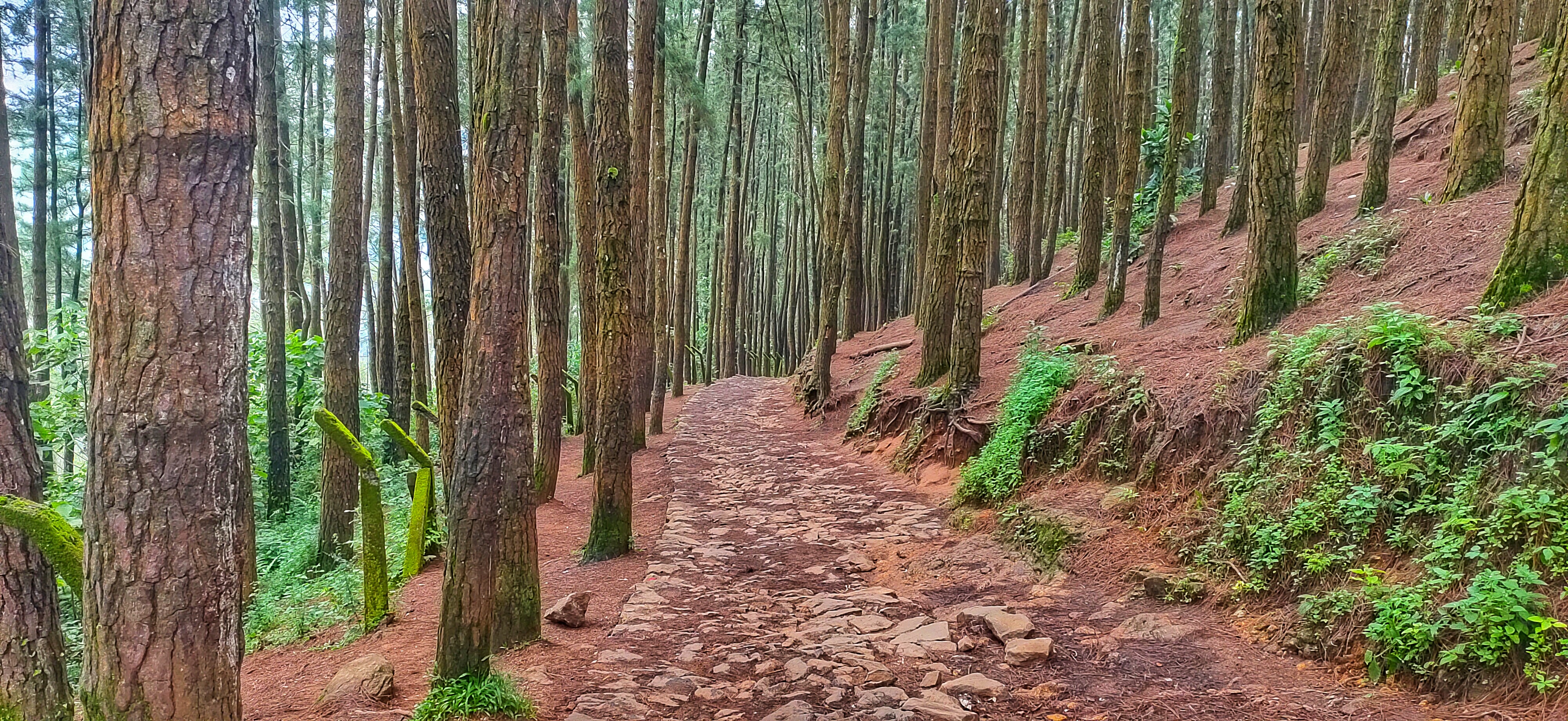
Pine Forest at Kolahalamedu

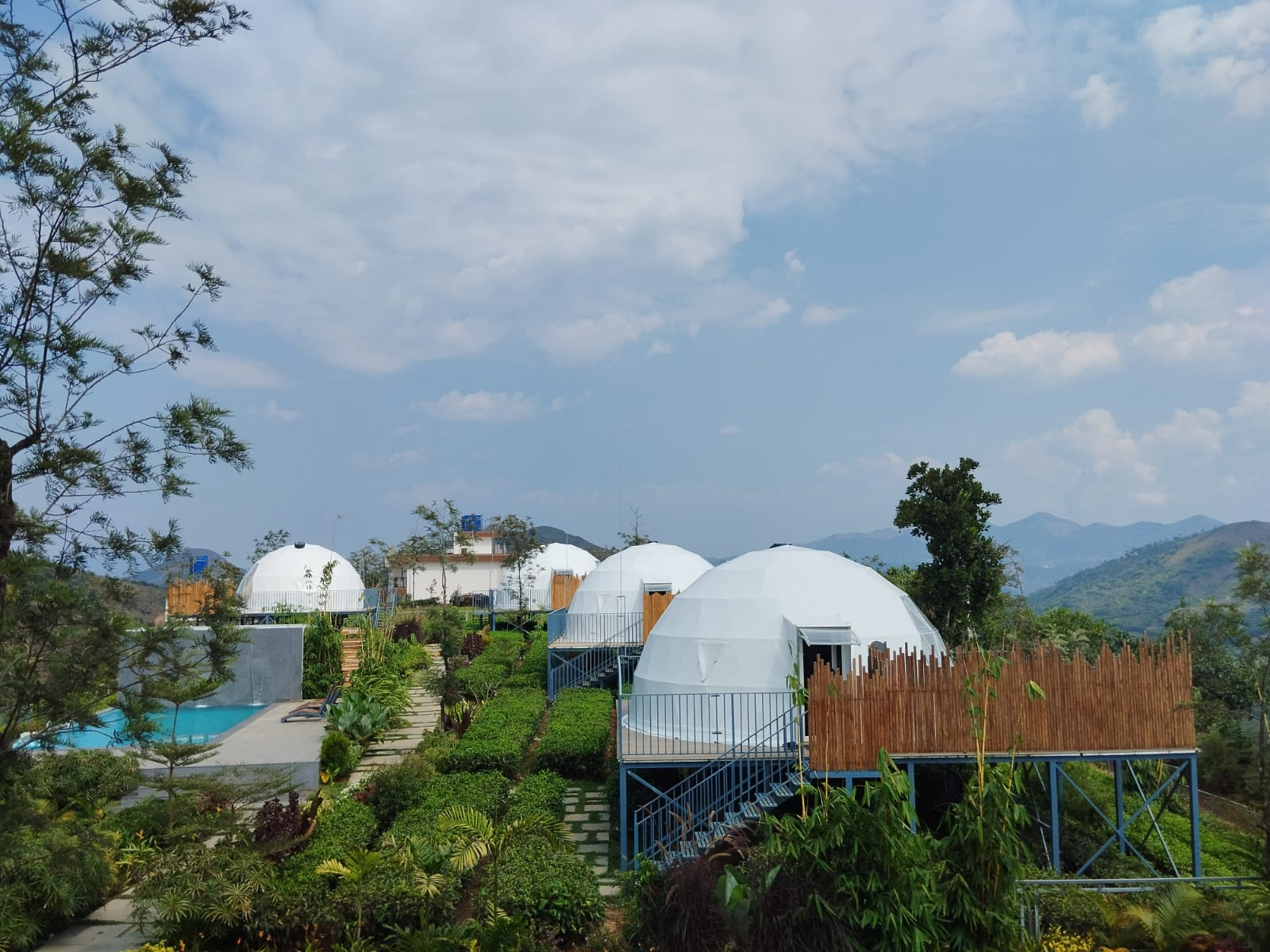
Glamping in a resort at Vagamon

== See also ==
Kattappana

Kalvari Mount Kottamala
