= D. C. Kizhakemuri =

Indian writer

- Born: Dominic Chacko Kizhakemuri; 12 January 1914; Kanjirappally, Kingdom of Travancore, British India (present day Kottayam, Kerala, India)
- Died: 26 January 1999 (aged 85)
- Occupations: Writer; Activist; Book publisher
- Parents: Chacko; Mumnayat Eliyamma

Dominic Chacko Kizhakemuri (12 January 1914 – 26 January 1999) was an Indian writer, activist, freedom-fighter and book publisher from Kerala. He founded the book publishing company known as DC Books.

He played a pivotal role in abolishing sales tax on books in the erstwhile state of Travancore. This move influenced the then Prime Minister Jawaharlal Nehru to abolish sales tax on books across India. He was awarded Padma Bhushan in 1999. He was instrumental in promoting Malayalam, a South Indian language, through his writings as an author, and was a columnist for various publications and through his printing and publishing company, DC Books and retail concern Current Books.

== Early life ==
Dominic Chacko Kizhakemuri was born to Chacko and Mumnayat Eliyamma on 12 January 1914 at Kanjirappally in the erstwhile Kingdom of Travancore.

He started his career as a teacher at the age 16 in Kanjirappally. He was then known as 'Kochusaar' meaning 'Little Teacher'. Later he passed TTC from Changanassery and served as a teacher for 12 more years.

At that time, he was attracted towards the Indian freedom struggle and became a part of the Indian National Congress. By 1937, he became an active member of the INC and conducted many freedom fight meetings with K. J. Thomas. In 2001, DC Kizhakemuri Foundation (DCKF) was formed as a tribute to him.

== DC Books ==
DC Books is a publisher and bookseller with headquarters in Kottayam, Kerala, India. It publishes over 6,500 titles, mainly literature in Malayalam, but also including children's literature, poetry, reference, biography, self-help, yoga, management titles, and foreign translations. It distributes 70% of books across Kerala.

D. C. Kizhakemuri's destiny was however, inextricably linked with books. He along with his friends Ponkunnam Varkey, P. T. Chacko and K. J. Thomas opened a bookstore called National Book Stall in Kottayam. Soon after that, D. C. Kizhakemuri started Sahithya Pravarthaka Co-operative Society (SPCS) along with M. P. Paul and Karoor Neelakanta Pillai. The society was the first of its kind in Asia. SPCS published the best of works in Malayalam and worked for the welfare of the writers.

In 1949, NBS and SPCS joined forces. Under the dynamic stewardship of D. C. Kizhakemuri, this merger heralded a new age in Malayalam publishing and production which was, till then in a very dismal state. The NBS network covered all the districts of Kerala and SPCS emerged as the biggest publisher.
