= Vandiperiyar =

Vandiperiyar വണ്ടിപ്പെരിയാർ Periyar
- Town
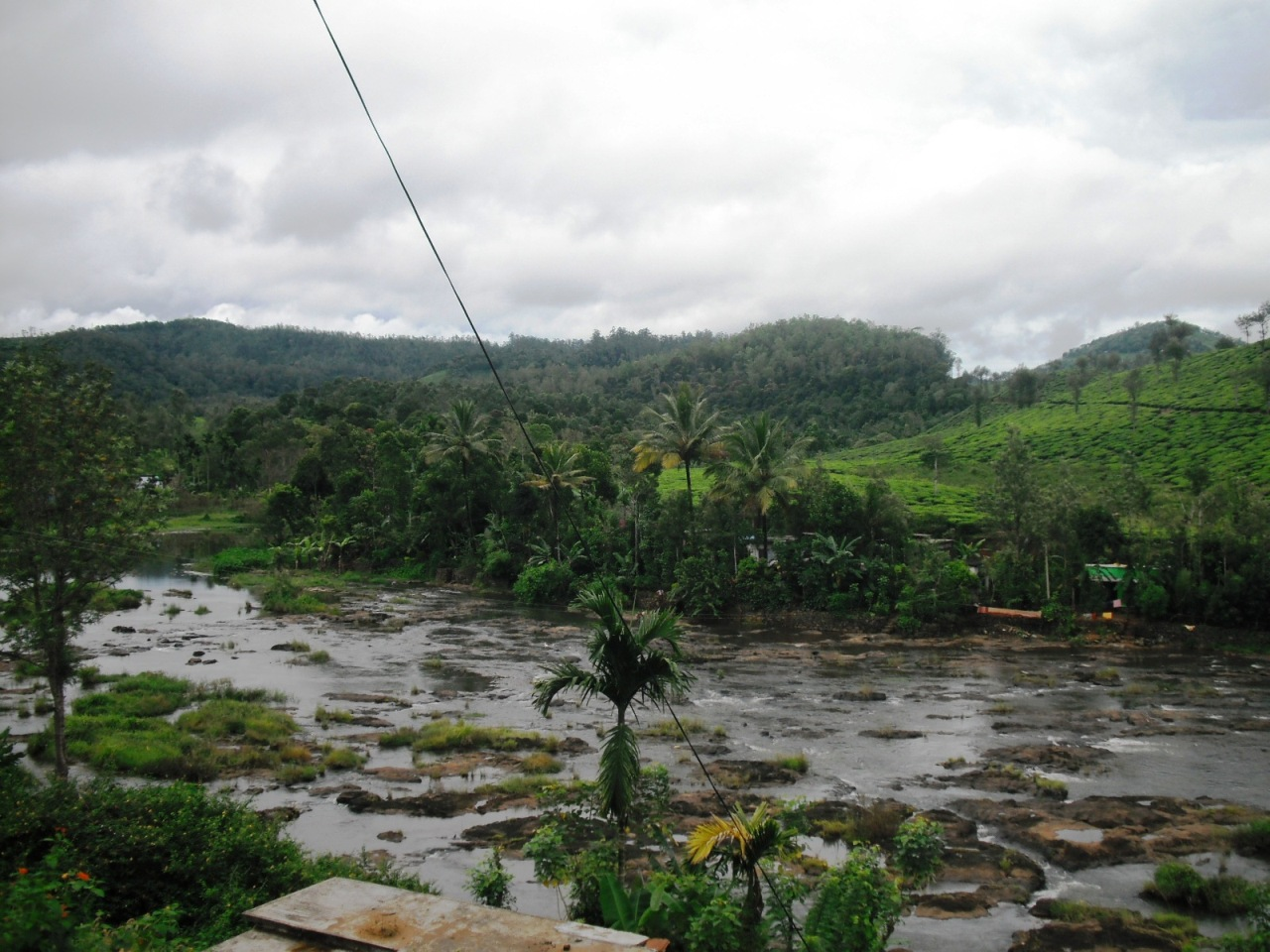
- Periyar river at Vandiperiyar

- Location in Kerala, India Vandiperiyar (India)
- Coordinates: 9°34′12″N 77°5′26″E
- Country: India
- State: Kerala
- District: Idukki
- Taluk: Peerumedu

Area
  - Total: 50.98 km^{2} (19.68 sq mi)
- Elevation: 836 m (2,743 ft)

Population (2011)
  - Total: 22,978
  - Density: 450.7/km^{2} (1,167/sq mi)

Languages
  - Official: Malayalam, English
  - Regional: Malayalam, Tamil
- Time zone: UTC+5:30 (IST)
- PIN: 685533
- Vehicle registration: KL-37

Vandiperiyar, IPA: [ʋɐɳɖipːeɾijɐːr], is a spice village in Idukki district, in the Indian state of Kerala. It is known for tourism, tea and coffee plantations, black pepper and other spice products. It is also known as an educational city and a number of tea factories are situated in the town. The Periyar River flows through the town.

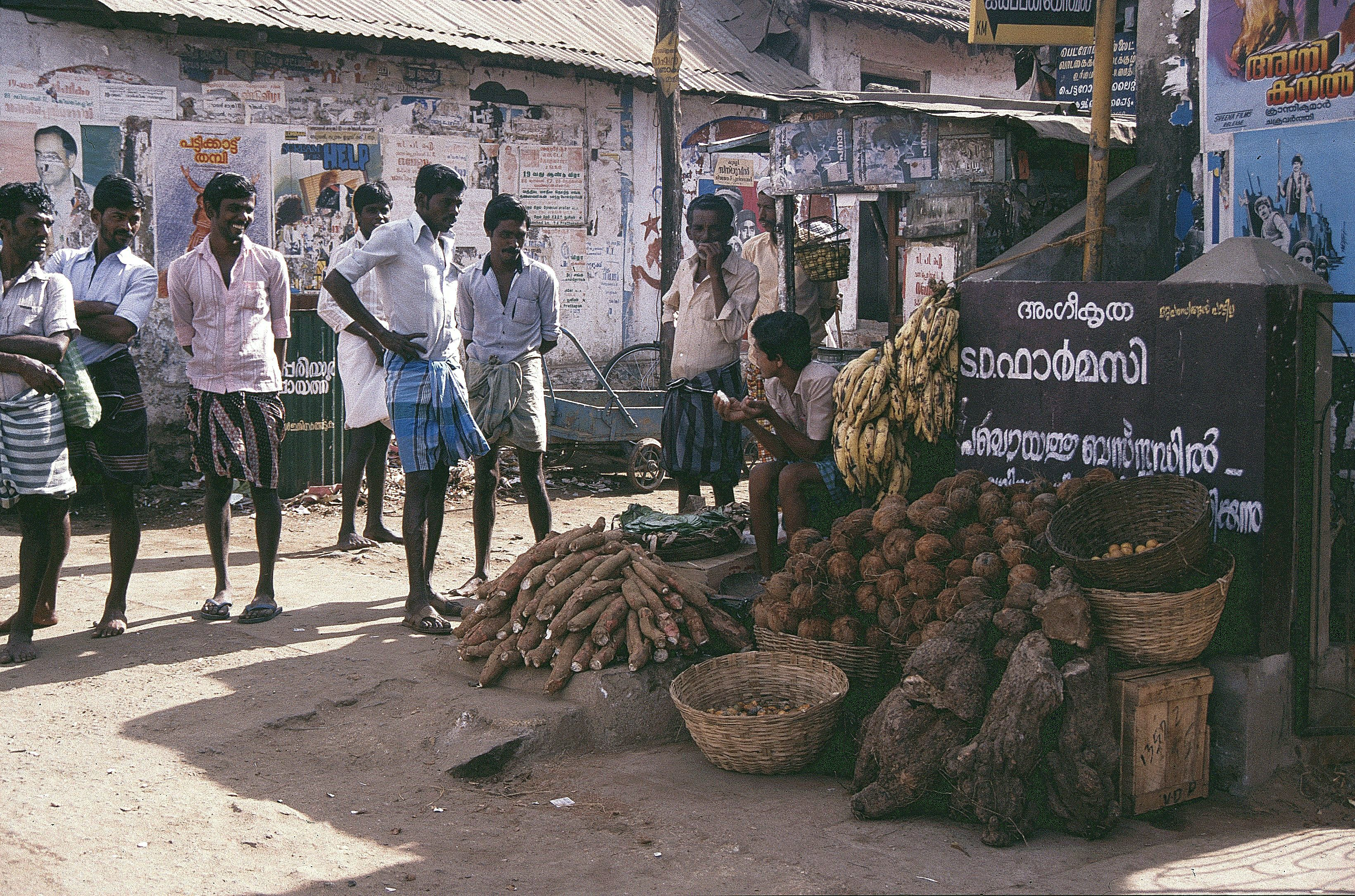
Village vegetable shop

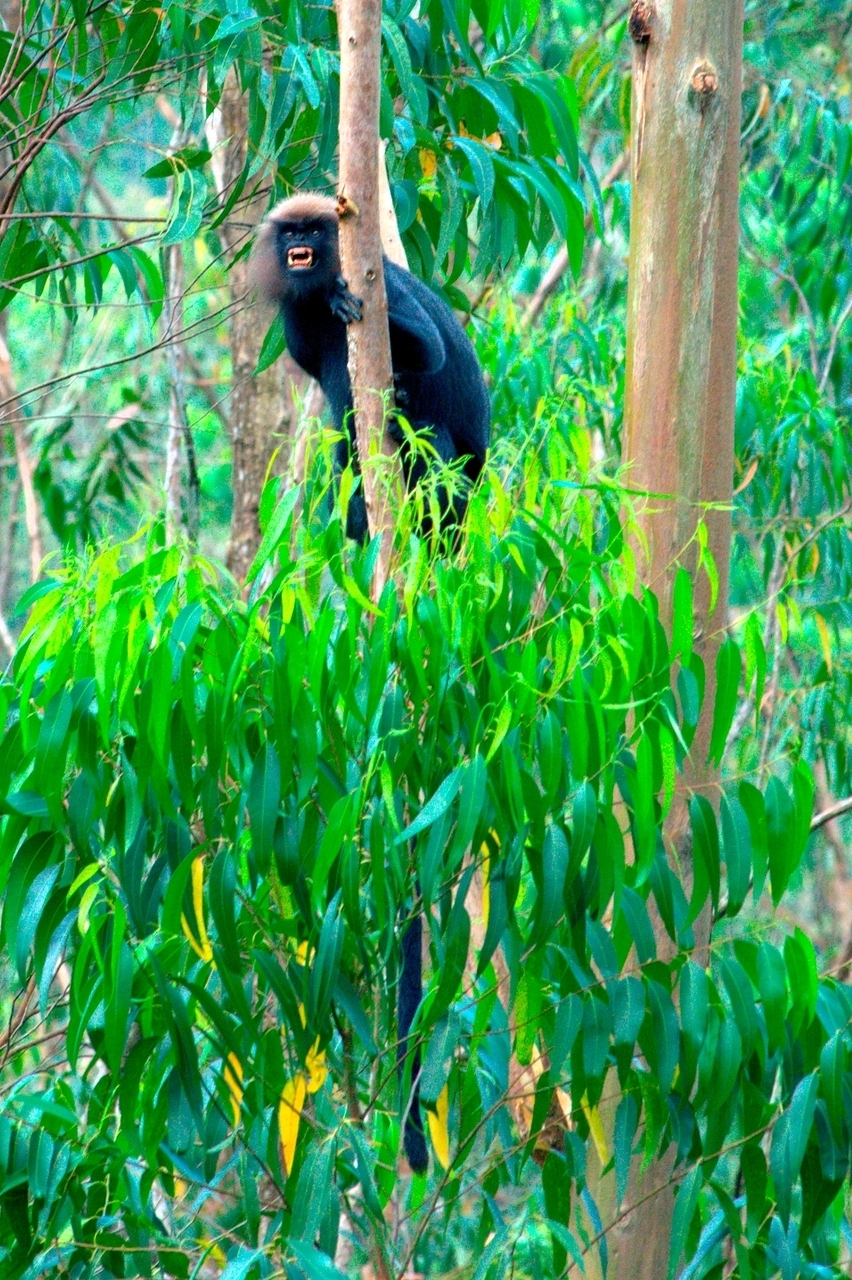
Nilgiri langur at Vandiperiyar

== Geography ==
It is located at an altitude of 836 m above MSL.

The Periyar River flows through Vandiperiyar.

== Demographics ==
As of 2011 Census, Periyar village had a population of 22,978 which constitutes 11,397 males and 11,581 females. Periyar village has an area of 50.98 km^{2} (19.68 sq mi) with 5,749 families residing in it. In Periyar, 9.38% of the population was under 6 years of age. Periyar had an average literacy of 86.38% higher than the national average of 74% and lower than state average of 94%.

== Location ==
Vandiperiyar is on National Highway 183, directly connected with Kottayam. Thekkady is 18 km away.

== Economy ==
Tea, coffee and pepper plantations are abundant. They are the main source of income for many people.
