= Upputhara =

- village
- Location in Kerala, India Upputhara (India)
- Coordinates: 9°41′0″N 77°1′0″E
- Country: India
- State: Kerala
- District: Idukki

Government
  - Type: Panchayath
  - Body: Upputhara grama panchayath

Area
  - Total: 135 km^{2} (52 sq mi)

Population (2011)
  - Total: 18,885
  - Density: 140/km^{2} (362/sq mi)

Languages
  - Official: Malayalam, English
- Time zone: UTC+5:30 (IST)
- PIN: 685505
- Vehicle registration: KL-37
- Nearest city: Kattappana

Upputhara is a village in Idukki district in the Indian state of Kerala. Upputhara panchayat, belonging to the block panchayat of Kattappana, is situated in the southern part of Idukki district in the Peermade taluk. The panchayat is bordered by the Periyar River in the east, the Meenmutti Lake in the west, the Chinnar River and the Karintharuvi River in the south and the Kakkathode protected forests in the north. Upputhara is located in the Western Ghats region of Kerala that borders on the neighbouring State of Tamil Nadu. Geographically, Upputhara is divided into six types of land forms; mountains, highly steep land, moderately steep land, valleys, marshy lands and rocky lands. Of these six land forms, about 40 percent of the total area is classified as valleys. Next in importance are marshy lands, slightly steep land, mountains, very steep land and rocky lands, in that order. Valleys and marshy lands together accounted for 62 percent of the area. Owing to the presence of large tracts of land with undulating topography, agriculture in Upputhara is faced with several challenges such as soil erosion.

The entire region around Upputhara remained uninhabited till about the early part of the 20th century. Upputhara was one of the regions to which migration of farmers from other parts of Kerala = took place. A group of seven Christian households came to Upputhara in 1910 from the Meenachil taluk of Kottayam district after acquiring licence from the Government of Travancore to establish tea plantations. The first migration to begin cultivation of crops outside the plantation segment took place, however, only later by the mid-1930s.

This type of migration to regions outside the plantation segment was mainly steered by a policy of the Government of Travancore to distribute pattas (possession rights) to migrant farmers in previously uninhabited areas. The largest flow of migrants into Upputhara and its surrounding regions took place in the 1950s.

Farmers who migrated into Upputhara after the 1930s were primarily involved in the cultivation of coffee, pepper and a few tuber intercrops. Tea was cultivated only in large plantations. From the cultivation of only a few crops in the 1950s, the cropping pattern in Upputhara became diversified significantly by the 1990s. Data for the panchayat for the year 1996-97 shows that the cultivation of tea accounts for the largest area – about 59 per cent of the gross cropped area. Pepper, cultivated in 17 per cent of the gross cropped area, is the second most important crop in terms of cultivated area. Coffee (8.1 percent of the gross cropped area) and cardamom (4 percent of the gross cropped area) are the other main crops. Cultivation of banana, tapioca and coconut are also practised .

Upputhara is in news these days following the frequent earthquakes around the place. The villagers are in fear, as the tremours may cause the delicate Mullaperiyar Dam to burst at any time. If the dam breaks, the 1,000 houses in Upputhara will be the first to washed away.

== Educational institutions ==
- St.Philomena's Higher Secondary School
- OM Lower Primary School

== Hospitals ==
- Community Health Centre (CHC)
- Veterinary Dispensary upputhara
- Govt Homeopathic Centre

== Demographics ==
The panchayat comprises an area of 135 km^{2}. As of 2011 India census, Upputhara had a population of 18885 with 9453 males and 9432 females. Scheduled castes formed about 15 percent of the population in that year. There was a sizeable population of Catholic Christians in the panchayat who played a major role in its social life.
