= Peruvanthanam =

- village
- Location in Kerala, India Peruvanthanam (India)
- Coordinates: 9°33′0″N 76°55′0″E
- Country: India
- State: Kerala
- District: Idukki

Government
  - Type: Panchayath
  - Body: Peruvanthanam grama panchayath

Area
  - Total: 57.36 km^{2} (22.15 sq mi)

Population (2011)
  - Total: 14,093
  - Density: 307/km^{2} (800/sq mi)

Languages
  - Official: Malayalam, English
- Time zone: UTC+5:30 (IST)
- Postal code: 685532
- Area code: +91 - 04868
- Vehicle registration: KL-37, KL-34
- Coastline: 0 kilometres (0 mi)
- Website: Isgkerala.in/peruvanthanampanchayath

Peruvanthanam is a village in Idukki district in the state of Kerala in southwestern India.

== Demographics ==
As of 2011 India census, Peruvanthanam had a population of 14093 with 6996 males and 7097 females.

== Notable people ==
Astrophysicist Nitya Kallivayalil originally comes from Peruvanthanam.
