= DC Books =

Indian book publishing company based in Kerala

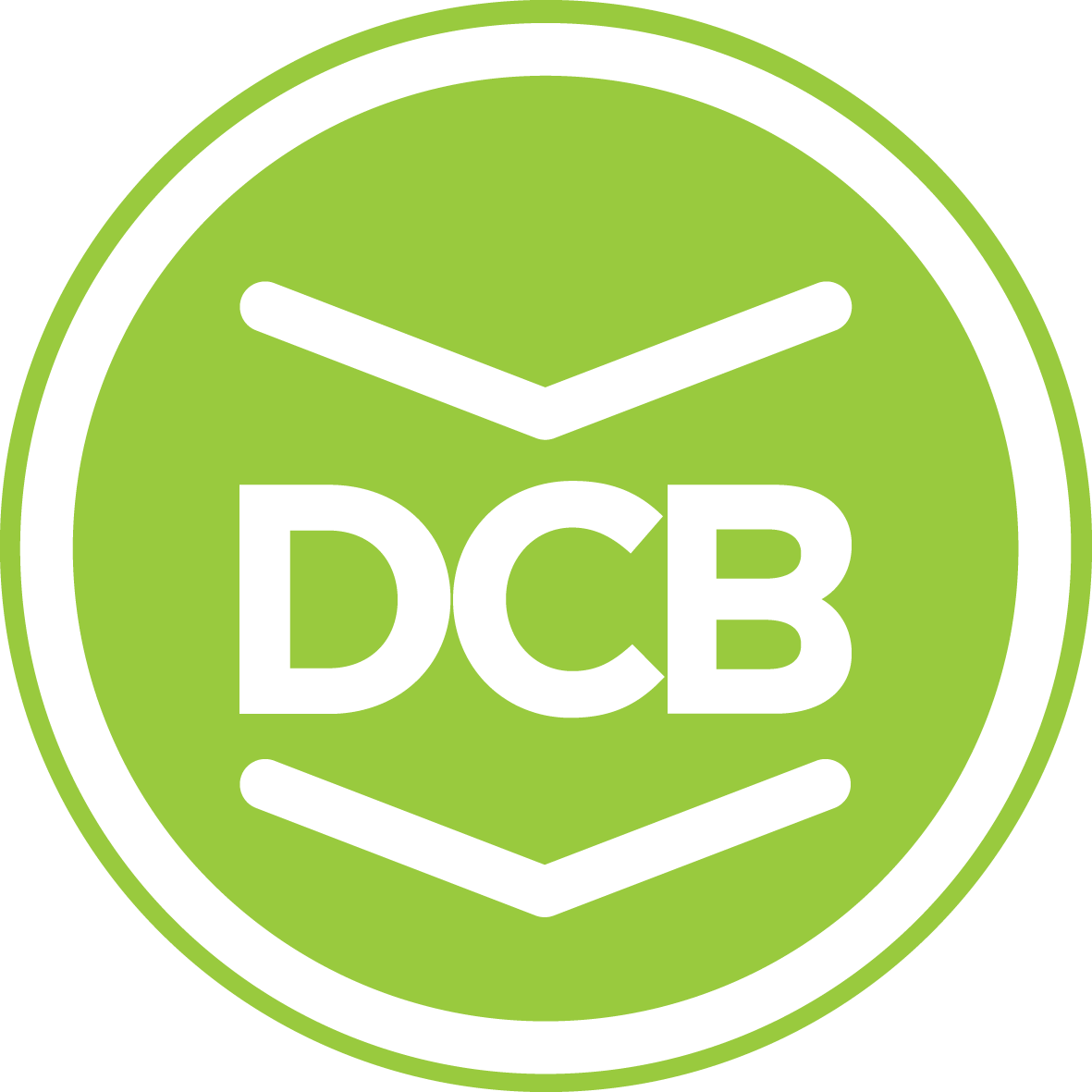
- Founded: 1974; 52 years ago
- Founder: Dominic Chacko Kizhakemuri
- Country of origin: India
- Headquarters location: Kottayam, Kerala
- Official website: www.dcbooks.com

DC Books is a book publisher based in Kerala, India. It publishes books in Malayalam.

== DC Books ==
DC Books is a publisher and bookseller with headquarters in Kottayam, Kerala, India. It has published over 6,500 titles, mainly literature in Malayalam, but also including children's literature, poetry, reference, biography, self-help, yoga, management titles, and foreign translations.

DC Media is the media division of DC Books. DC Media publishes five magazines including Education Insider, Asia's leading magazine on education; Future Medicine, a magazine on the Asian medical industry; Emerging Kerala, Kerala's fastest growing magazine on business, economy and society; Money Indices; and Travel and Flavors.

DC Books was founded in 1974 by Dominic Chacko Kizhakemuri, known as D.C. Kizhakemuri, or DC. At that time, DC was secretary of the Sahithya Pravarthaka Co-operative Society, a cooperative venture of Malayalam writers. The society helped writers with business and publishing details and instituted a standard royalty of 30-40%, as well as the system of an 'advance' payment for their books to help enable them to devote themselves to writing full-time. When DC turned his attention to founding DC Books, DC began promoting and creating markets for its books by organizing festivals, clubs, and pre-publication subscriptions, and installment schemes. Their bookclub scheme allows buyers to build a library of their own by buying books on installments. In 1977, Current Books became its sister business. In 2001, DC Books launched dcbooks.com, an Indian local language bookstore with over 4,000 titles. In 2004, DC Books partnered with Corner Books to open a New Delhi branch for Keralites in Delhi.

DC Books is the publisher of several translation dictionaries used by professionals and South Asian Linguists, such as their:

- "English-English-Malayalam dictionary" by T. Ramalingam Pillai (ISBN 81-7130-302-1)
- Malayalam English Dictionary by M. Varier, et al.

== Imprints ==
DC Books is the parent company of the following imprints:

- DC Books: non-fiction, literature, translations, and reference books
- Kairali Mudralayam: popular fiction, including children's books and translations
- Kairali Children's Book Trust: produces children's literature and gives annual awards for best works in Malayalam
- Mango Books: Children's imprint in English. Winner of Awards for Excellence (2014) constituted by the Federation of Indian Publishers.

== Achievements ==
- In 2004 alone, won five awards in the General, Reference, Paperback, House Magazine, and Catalogues categories for their: Malayalam Encyclopedia, Thesaurus, Charithrakaandom, Pachakuthira.
- In 2004 alone, D.C. Books brought out 531 titles, the maximum number among Indian publishers
- DC Books was the first publishers/book sellers in India to get ISO 9000 Certification.

== Controversy ==
In 2004, DC Books published a translated version of Britannica Concise Encyclopædia into Malayalam in the name Britannica Malayalam Encyclopedia. The book won an award from the Federation of Indian Publishers in 2004.

The sale of the book was banned by a Consumer Court due to numerous factual errors, rendering it an erroneous reference. The court also found that unfair trade practices were employed by the publishers, namely DC Books, Kerala and Encyclopædia Britannica India Pvt. Ltd., a subsidiary of Encyclopædia Britannica Inc.

== DC Books Clubs and Festivals ==
The DC International Book Fair offers book releases and exhibitions. The Fair also features youth contests in Spot Poetry Writing, English Quiz, Malayalam Quiz, Street Drama - Malayalam, Declamation, Pen A Story, Special Schools Only, Film Appreciation, English Reading, Malayalam Reading, Painting, and Readers Theatre.

== Headquarters ==
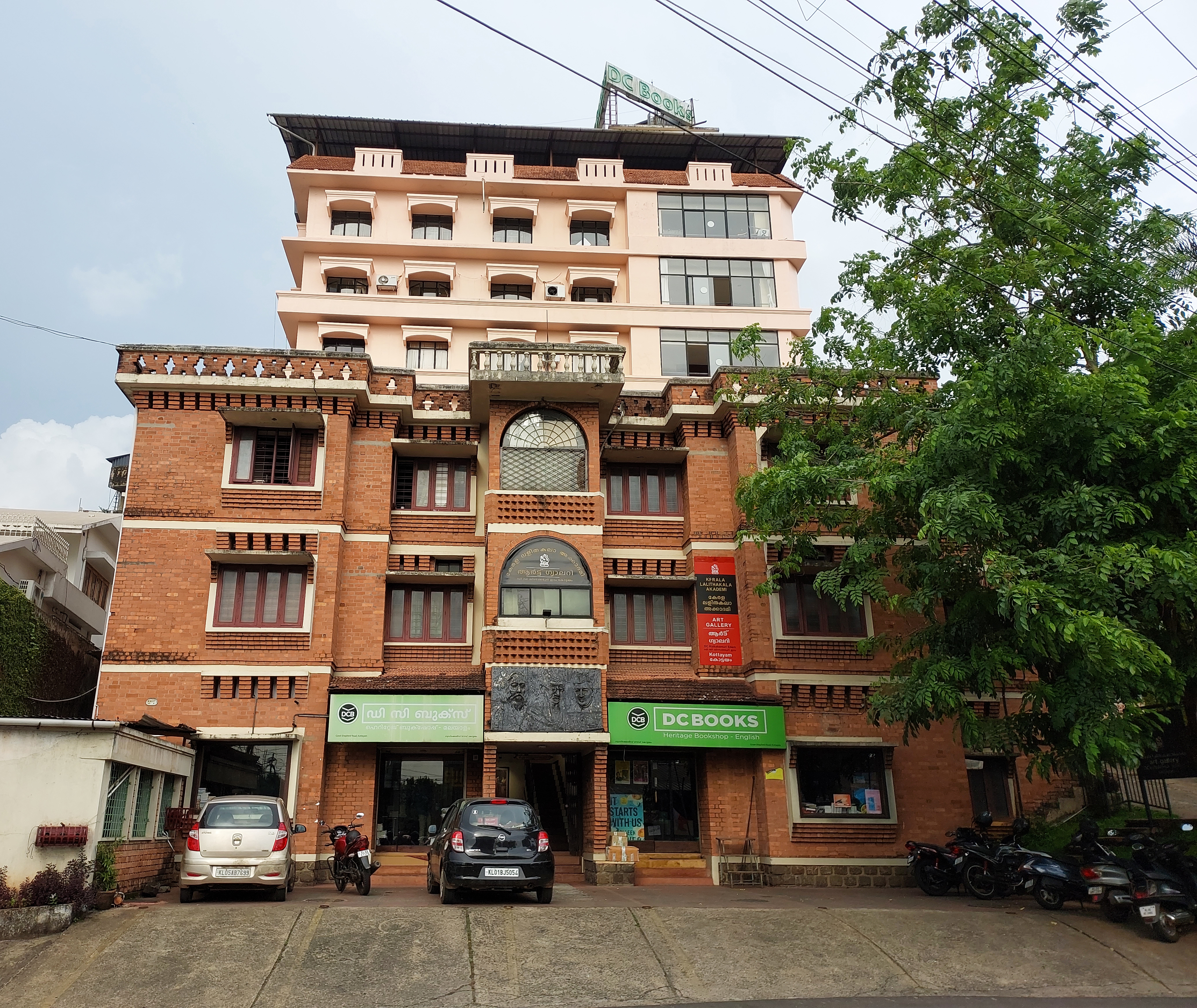
DC Books headquarters, Kottayam

The headquarters of DC Books on Good Shepherd Street in Kottayam houses an art gallery, hosting exhibits of modern and traditional paintings and sculptures.

== DC Media ==
DC Media, the media wing of DC Books was launched in January 2011. DC Media publishes Education Insider, a pan-Asian magazine for the education sector; Future Medicine, a global magazine on health and medicine; Emerging Kerala (Magazine), a magazine which focuses on the socio-economic development of Kerala; and Pachakuthira, a magazine which intervenes into the socio-political space.
