= Idukki district =

Largest district in Kerala, India

- District
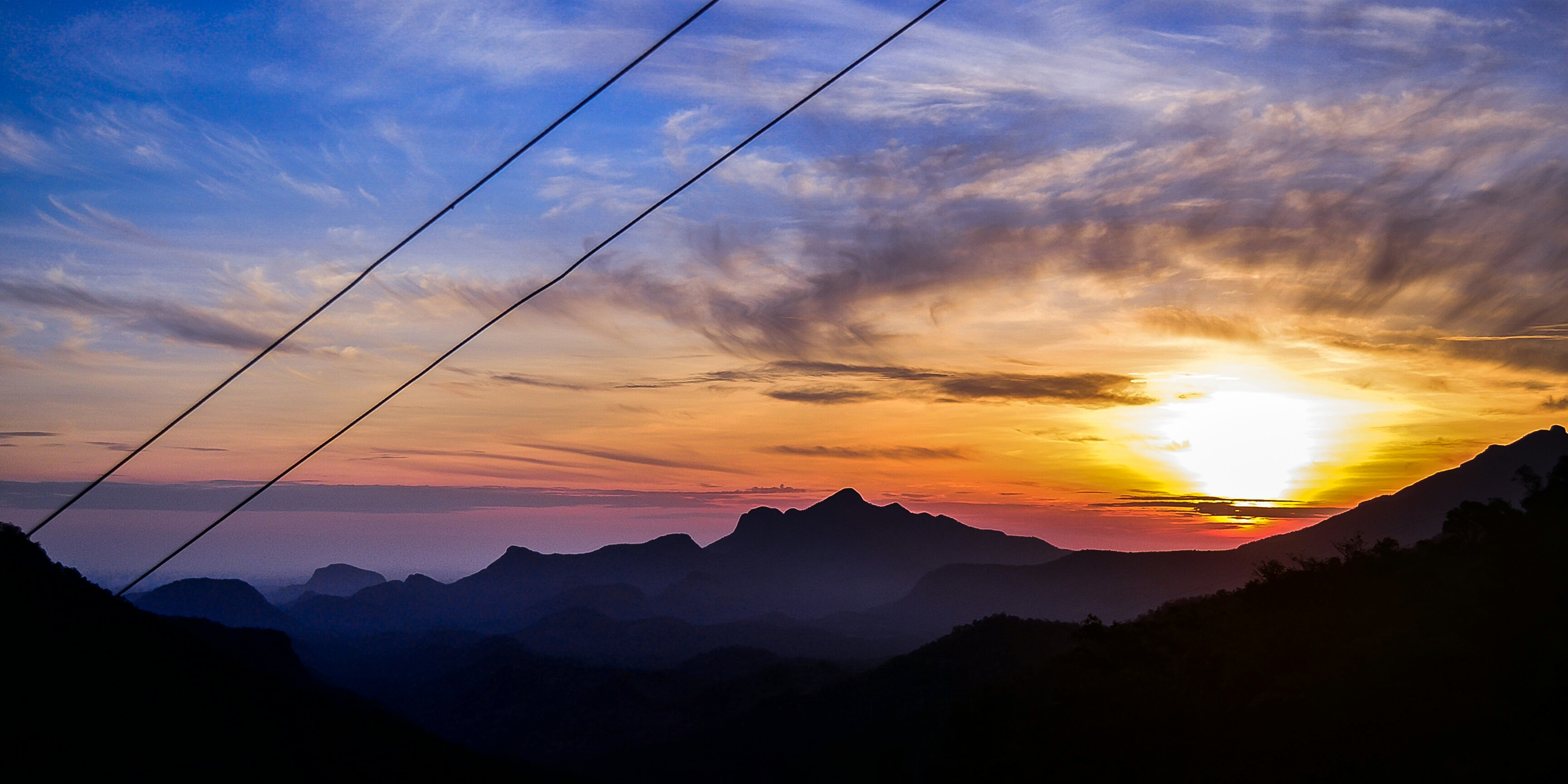
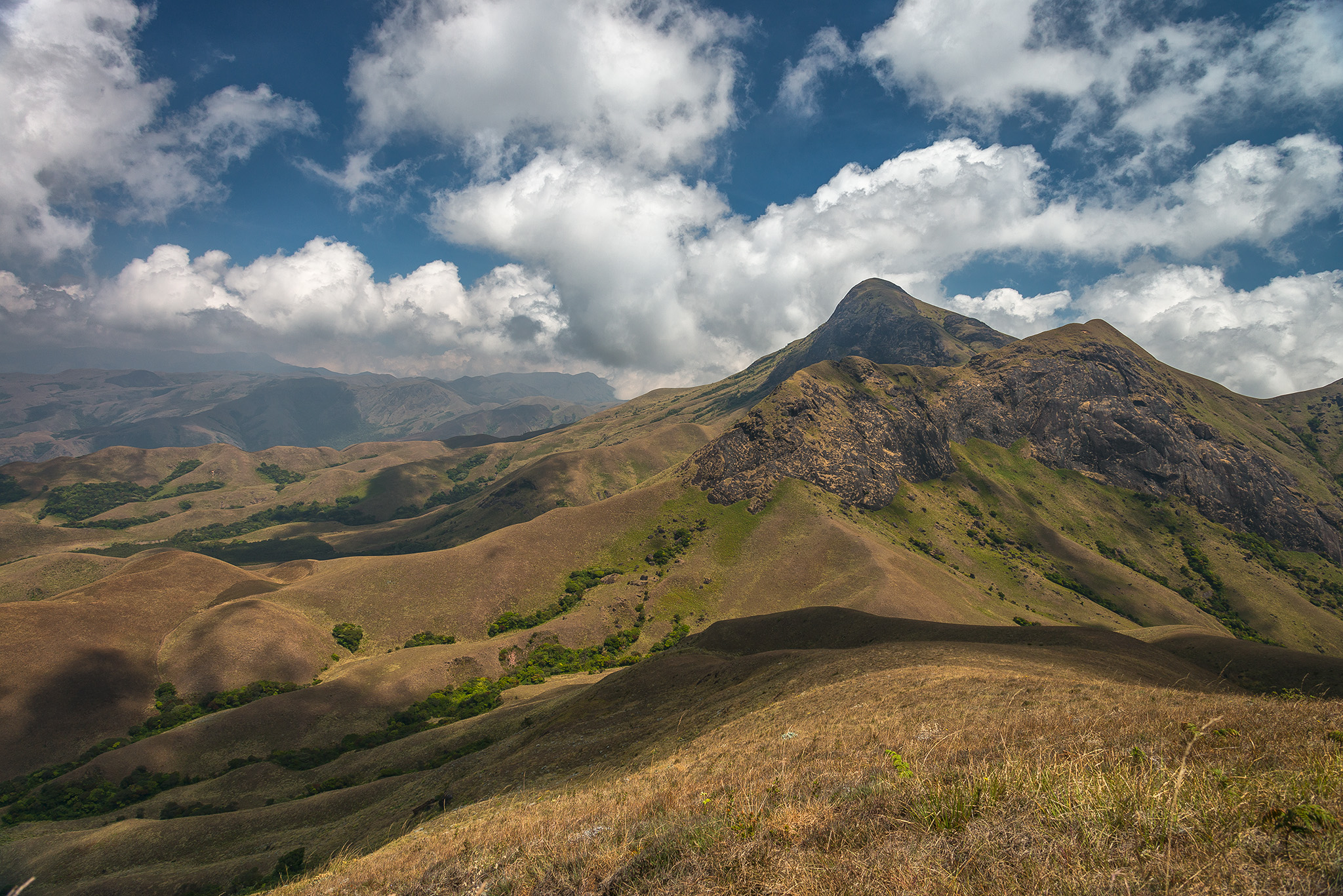
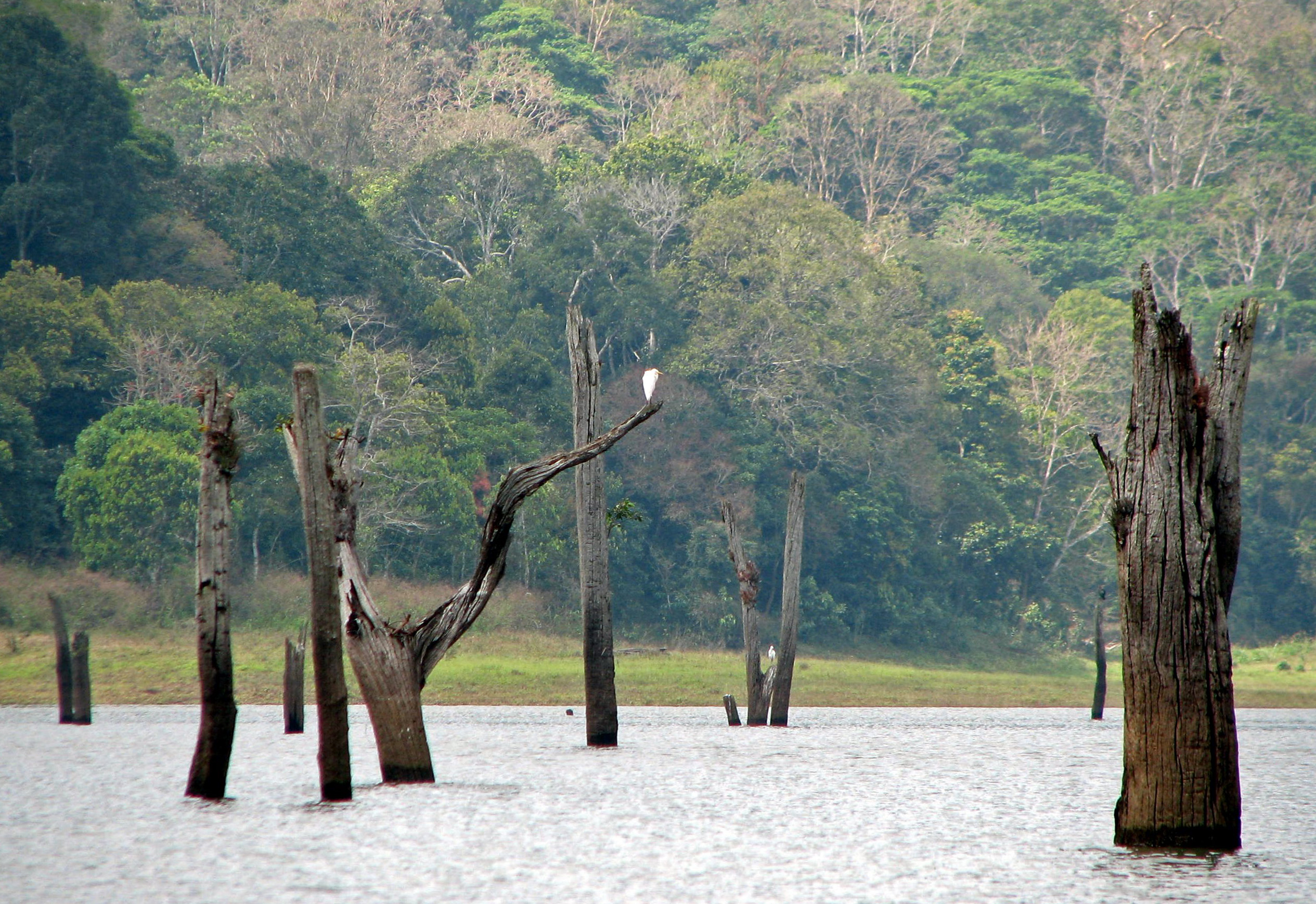
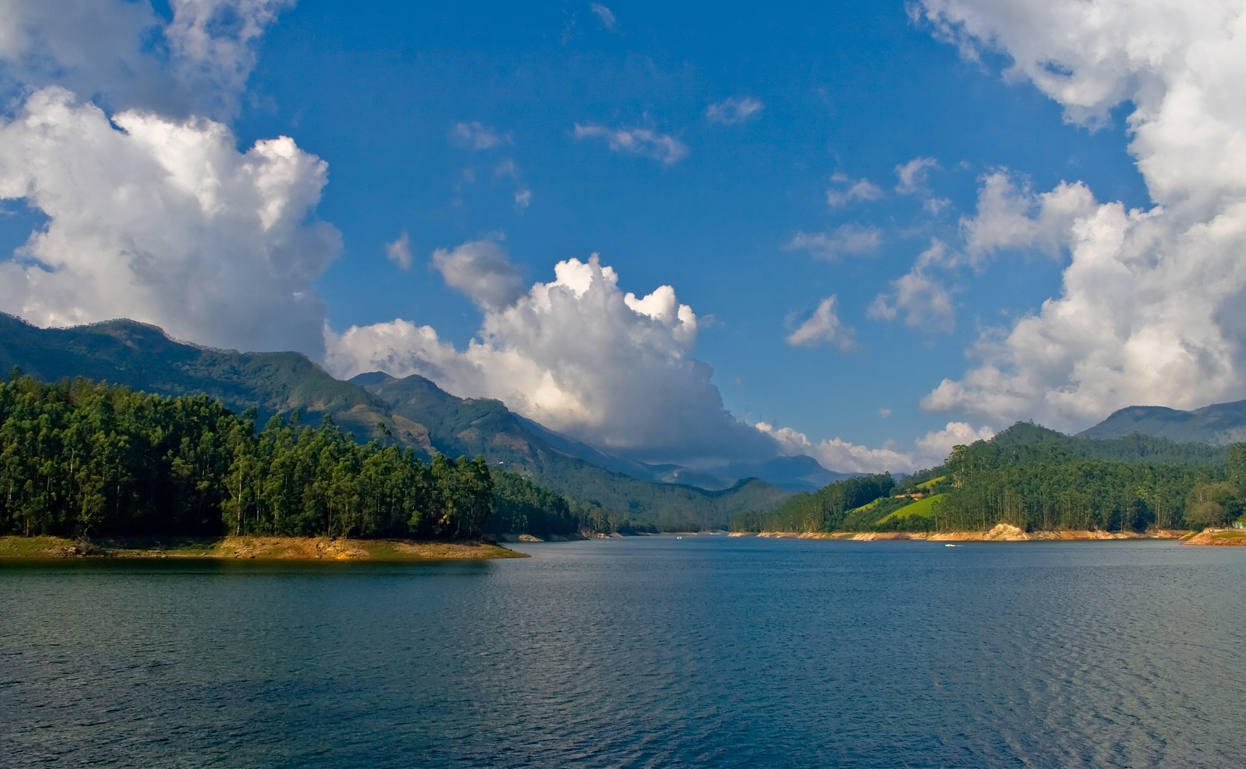
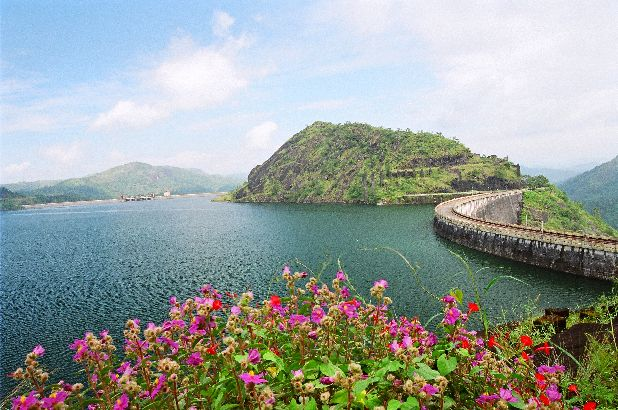
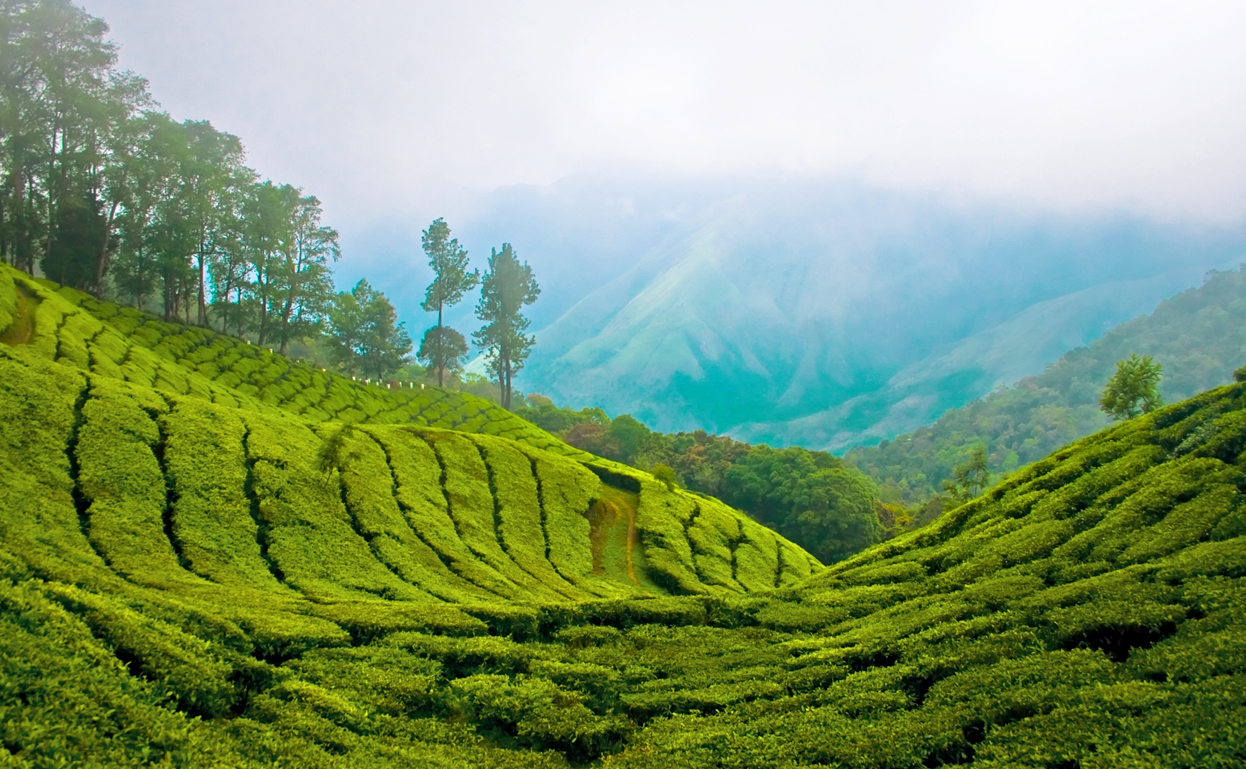
- Clockwise from top: Sunrise at Munnar, Periyar National Park, Idukki Dam, Tea plantation on Cardamom Hills, Mattupetty Dam, and Anamudi peak.
- Nickname: The Spice Garden of Kerala
- Location in Kerala
- Interactive map of Idukki district
- Coordinates: 9.85°N 76.94°E
- Country: India
- State: Kerala
- Established: 1972
- Headquarters: Painavu
- Subdivisions: Revenue divisions (2): Idukki; Devikulam; : Taluks (5): Devikulam; Thodupuzha; Udumbanchola; Peermade; Idukki

Government
  - Additional District Magistrate: Shri Sreejith S IAS
  - Collector: Shri Dineshan Cheruvatt IAS
  - District Police Chief: Vishnu Pratheep T.K IPS

Area
  - Total: 4,612 km^{2} (1,781 sq mi)
  - Rank: 1st
- Elevation: 1,200 m (3,900 ft)

Population (2018)
  - Total: 1,093,156
  - Density: 251/km^{2} (650/sq mi)

Languages
  - Official: Malayalam, English
  - Minority: Tamil
- Time zone: UTC+5:30 (IST)
- ISO 3166 code: IN-KL
- Vehicle registration: KL-06 Idukki; KL-37 Vandiperiyar; KL-38 Thodupuzha; KL-68 Devikulam; KL-69 Udumbanchola; KLI Old Registration
- HDI (2005): ▲0.754 ( High)
- Website: www.idukki.nic.in

Idukki district (ഇടുക്കി; IPA: [iɖukːi]) is one of the 14 districts in the Indian state of Kerala in the southwest of the country. It is the largest district in Kerala and lies amid the Cardamom Hills of Western Ghats in Kerala. Idukki district contains two municipal towns – Kattappana and Thodupuzha, and five taluks.

The district was constituted on 26 January 1972, by taking Peerumade, Udumbanchola, Devikulam taluks of the former High Range division from Kottayam district and the Thodupuzha taluk from Ernakulam district. Its division was previously headquartered at Kottayam city but moved to Kuyilimala near Painavu and Cheruthoni in June 1976. Malayalam and English are the two official administrative languages in the district. Tamil is the second most spoken language in Idukki district after Malayalam.

Around 66% of Kerala's power needs come from various hydroelectric power projects in Idukki district. Numerous cash crops and spices are cultivated throughout the district, making it The Spice Garden of Kerala. A significant area in the district is protected as reserved forests and wildlife sanctuaries. The Periyar River is a major river that originates and flows through Idukki. The Pamba River is another important river that originates from Idukki district.

Though it is the largest district in the region in terms of area, it has the lowest population density among the districts of Kerala. There are only two municipalities in the district and the urban population is comparatively much lower than the rural population, due to its mountainous nature. The 2,695 metres (8,842 ft) high peak of Anamudi, which is also the highest point of elevation in India outside the Himalayas, lies in the northern portion of the district of Idukki. The Idukki Dam is one of the highest arch dams in Asia.

The major tourism destination of Idukki is Munnar.

== Etymology ==
The name Idukki was derived from the Malayalam word ‘Idukk’, which means gorge.

== History ==
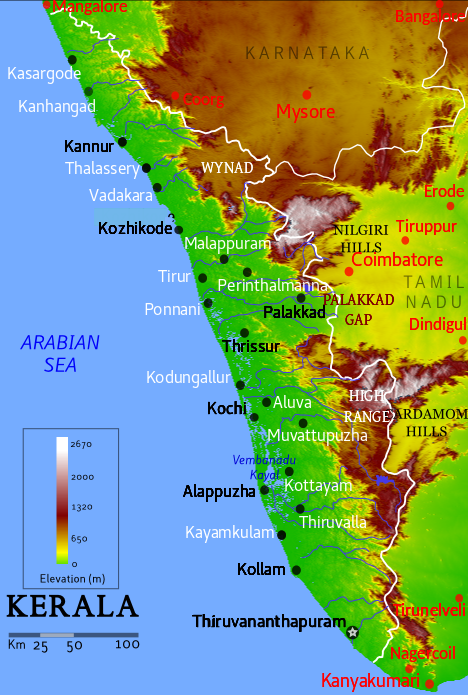
ittings topography

A perfect blend of the Malayali, the Tamil and various tribal cultures is found in the Idukki district. The temples and other older buildings in the High Range and the surrounding regions in Idukki have significant influences from the medieval era Tamil-Pandyan architectural styles. The mountain passes like Bodinayakkanur (connecting various mountain ranges) and Cumbum (which connects the eastern Tamil country with Thodupuzha) have facilitated trade and travel between the Tamil-Pandyan country which lay to the east of the Western Ghats and various Kerala kingdoms west of it during the medieval period. Periyar, the longest river in Kerala, has its source of origin and major portion of its route of flow, in the Idukki district. Pamba, the third-longest river in Kerala, also has its origin in the district of Idukki. During the Travancore Era, Munnar has acted as the summer residence of the British residents in Travancore. Higher peaks like Anamudi on the eastern border of the Idukki district have acted as a natural boundary between the Malayalam kingdoms and the contemporary Tamil kingdoms in the past, thereby reducing invasions into the region from the neighbouring Tamil country as well as from other parts of the Indian peninsula. The 17th century Dutch work, Hortus Malabaricus, contains information about the flora and fauna of the region at that time.

=== Pre-history ===
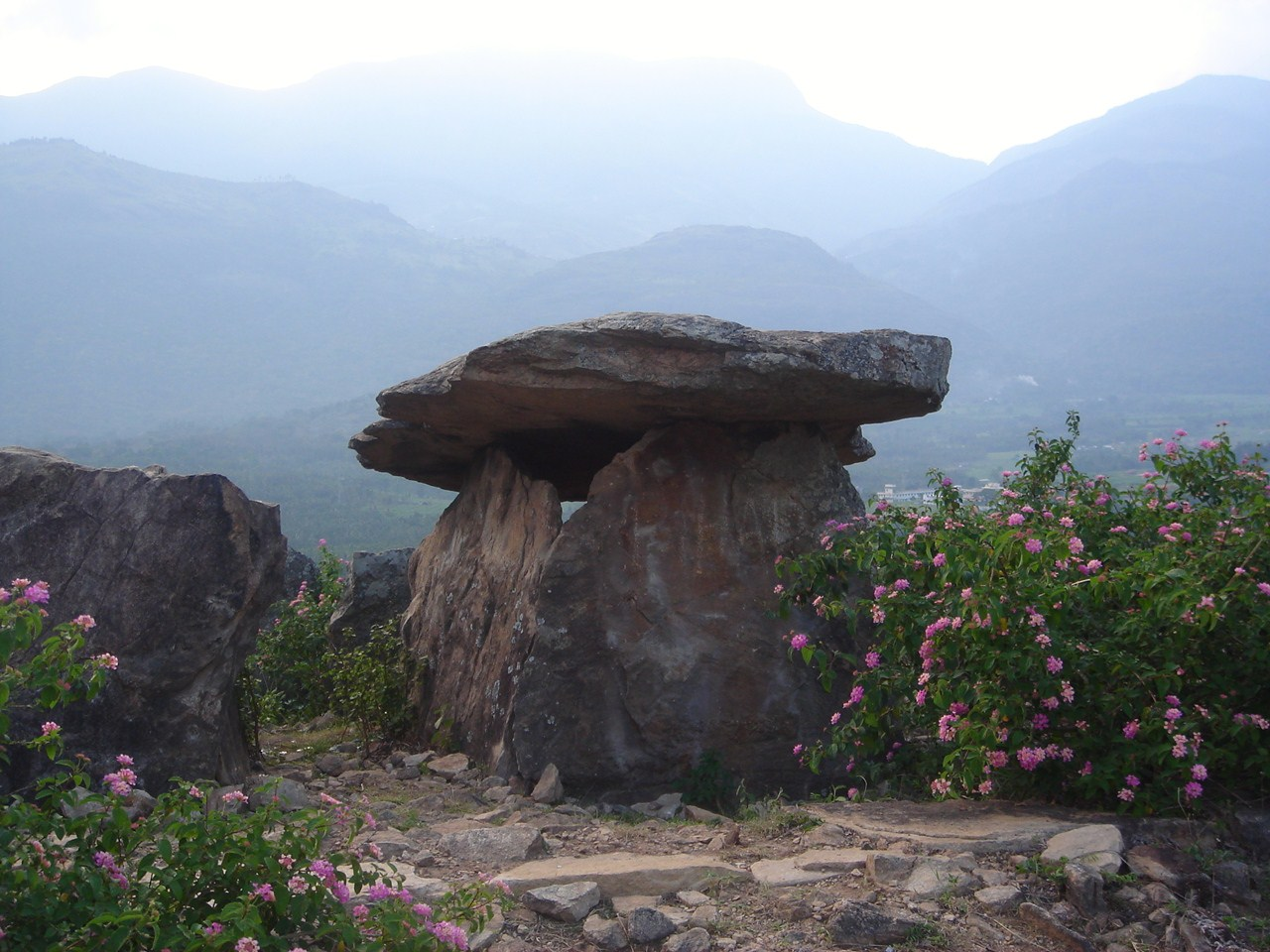
A dolmen erected by Neolithic people in Marayur

Archaeological findings found from the district include dolmens of the Neolithic era in the Marayur area. They are locally known as "muniyara", derived from muni (hermit or sage) and ara (dolmen).

Located on the highest point of elevation on the Peninsular India, the Cardamom Hills and its surrounding regions were inhabited by human beings during the Megalithic age itself. Numerous Megalithic monuments have been discovered from the mountainous regions of the district. The remnants of numerous Kodumkallaras and Kallaras have been found from various places at Marayur in Devikulam taluk. Megalithic remnants of Kallaras and Nadukkallus are also found at Kallarpattom colony in Udumbanchola taluk. Huge Kodumkallaras and Nadukkallus were discovered from the excavation sites in Vandiperiyar region as well. The Megalithic monuments found from Idukki show numerous similarities with the contemporary remnants those discovered from Deccan Plateau and other parts of the South India. Usage of Iron was common in the Megalithic culture of Deccan. Tribals are another culture that was established on the hills of Idukki after the Stone Age culture. Although many of the social elements that existed in the Stone Age can be seen in the tribal culture here, the two groups represent two different periods. There is no clear evidence of where the Stone Age people went later. It is also thought that the mountain may have come down due to the weather and difficulties in living conditions. Tribal people found in Idukki are Mannan, Muthuvan, Paliyan, Urali, Malayarayan, Malapulayan, Ulladan. According to those who have studied the oral forms and rituals associated with tribal culture, tribal life begins in Idukki in the period 13 – 15 BC. Tribal people who were in contact with Tamil culture came to Idukki, from present day Coimbatore, Madurai and Ramanathapuram districts, as evidenced by their language, customs and art forms. According to modern anthropologists, the aborigines here belong to the Proto-Australoid race. Many stories are popular about their (Idukki) mountain climbing. One is that they were given the position of forest chiefs as a reward for helping the Pandya Raja clan. At one point, they had to leave Madurai and reached Idukki via Kumily via Gudalur in Tamilakkam with the help of King Poonjar. It is also believed that those who were appointed to collect forest products for the local kings settled down here over time. The tribal people here may have migrated here in search of better living facilities. As the number of families in each tribal village increases, a new community is created. The clothing used in the early days was wood made from crushed arayanjil. They also made musical instruments from animal skins. Adivasis have great ability to weave household items using reeds. They worshiped the forces of nature and trees. All the tribes had their own system of administration. The heads of the huts are known as Muppan or Kani depending on the caste. It is king among mannans. Urali are believed to be the first tribe to migrate to the hills of Idukki. Uralis still practice some practices of the Stone Age in a nominal way. It is believed that the black stone placed over the grave after burial is a continuation of the Stone Age grass stone. There are 33 tribal sanctuaries in Idukki including Venmani, Mullaringad, Nadukani, Kurukanadu, Koovakandam, Kannampadi, Muthampadi, East Mattucutta, Vellall, Memarikudi, Poovantikudi. In later times, the people who came to Poovanthikudi, Ayyappancoil who fled from the forest where the Mullaperiyar Dam is located, they left agriculture with the migration of the Britishers, Tamils and the Malayalis. All the adivasi tribes were the owners of a great cultural heritage, the tribals who danced in the inner forests, engaged in handicrafts, organized their lives in their own unique way and created many rare charms of the ancient culture. Almost all the tribal tribes of the Western Ghats were owners of a life identity that was destroyed by various invasions. Most of the land that the British planters found to plant cardamom, tea and coffee was in the lands where the tribal tribes roamed freely. As the mountains were cut down and whitened one by one, each tribal community was pushed back. Each of the tribes has their own language closely related to Tamil and Malayalam.

=== Classical Antiquity ===
Ancient Roman coins have been found from the regions like Edamaruku near Thodupuzha, indicating ancient trade between the Ancient Rome and the region during the Classical Antiquity. Spices might had been imported from the region as a part of the ancient Indian Ocean trade. Idukki district is still known as The Spice Garden of Kerala.

=== The Chera dynasty/The Keralaputras (up to 5th century CE) ===
The literary works of the Sangam period help to take a look into the contemporary period. According to those works, early members of the Chera dynasty (first few centuries of the Common Era) had their original headquarters in a region called Kuzhumur at Kuttanad in the ancient Tamilakam and were sometimes known as the Kuttuvans. Some historians have identified Kuzhumur with Kumily in Peerumade Taluk of the Idukki district. The Chera dynasty is mentioned as The Keralaputras in the inscriptions of the emperor Ashoka of the Maurya Empire (322 BCE – 184 BCE). The province Kuttanad in the ancient kingdom of Keralaputras included the modern-day districts of Idukki, Ernakulam, Kottayam, and parts of Alappuzha, which could be broadly defined as the region between the rivers Periyar and Pamba. It was bounded by the Ay kingdom to the south, which included the regions between Pamba River and Kanyakumari (Cape Comorin), and the province of Kudanad, which lies between the rivers Periyar and Chaliyar (modern-day districts of Thrissur, Palakkad, and Malappuram), to the north.

It was during the reign of Uthiyan Cheralathan (105–130 CE) that the Chera dynasty began to expand towards the northern and the eastern regions of Kuttanad by conquering the provinces of Kudanadu and Kongu Nadu. Afterwards the dynasty got split into three branches and fixed their capitals at Muziris, Tyndis, and Caroura, respectively, as seen in the ancient Greco-Roman travelogues as well as the Old Tamil literary works of the Sangam period. During the reign of Narmudi Cheral, the regions included in the Kingdom of Ezhimala was also added to the Chera empire.

The ancient Chera empire collapsed due to continuous invasions carried out by the Kalabhras, the Pallavas, the Chalukyas, the Pandyas, and the Rashtrakutas during the period between 500 CE and 800 CE for nearly three centuries.

=== The Chera Perumals of Mahodayapuram (800 – 1102 CE) ===
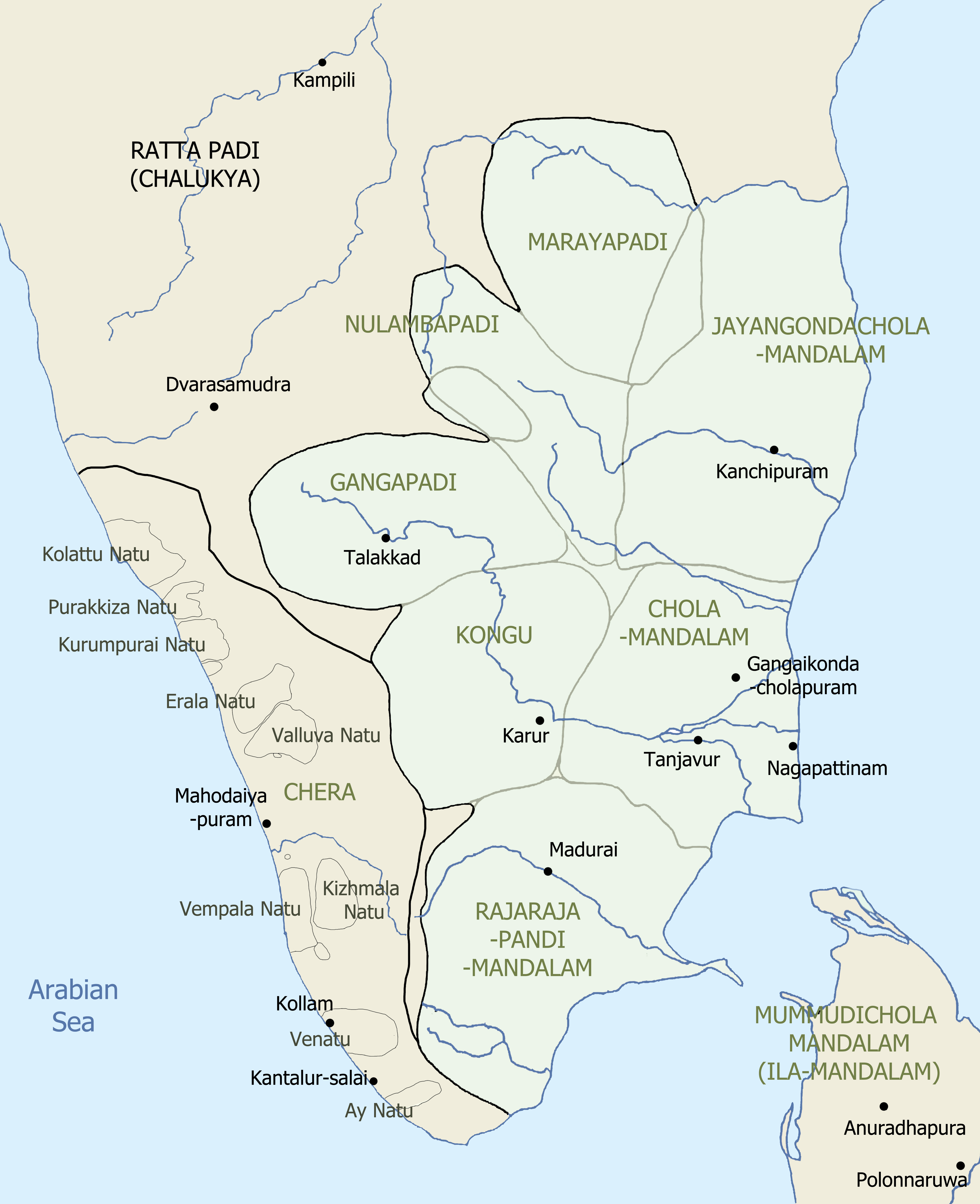
Kerala during 11th century CE (the region which is marked as Chera). The location of Keezhmalanadu is also marked.

Idukki was part of three Nadus (provinces) during the period of the Chera Perumals of Mahodayapuram (800 – 1102 CE) for nearly three centuries. The Thodupuzha-Muvattupuzha region was part of a province called Keezhmalanadu during this time, with its headquarters at Karikode near Thodupuzha. The High Range region, which lies to the east of Keezhmalanadu, was possibly included in two provinces namely Nantuzhanadu and Vempolinadu (known as Bimbali Desam in Sanskrit). This period saw the decline of Buddhism and Jainism, which were once prominent in the region, along with the growth of Hinduism, in the Thodupuzha region. The tribal cultures may have sustained in the sparsely populated High Range region. The territory of the Chera Perumals of Mahodayapuram got disintegrated into several small feudal states by early 12th century CE as a result of the continuous war that occurred between the Chera Perumals and the Medieval Cholas throughout the 11th century CE.

=== Kingdom of Keezhmalanadu (1102 – 1600 CE) ===
The province Keezhmalanadu of the Chera Perumals of Mahodayapuram attained political autonomy in 1102 CE following the Chera-Chola wars. Remnants of numerous medieval forts have been found from Karikode near Thodupuzha, which was the capital of the kingdom of Keezhmalanadu, many of them belonging to the era between 14th century CE and 16th century CE. Keezhmalanadu included parts of modern-day Taluks of Thodupuzha and Muvattupuzha. The Portuguese explorers described the region as "The Pepper country" due to the availability and high scale production of good quality Black pepper there during the 16th century CE. Keezhmalanadu merged with the Kingdom of Vadakkumkur around 1600 CE.

=== Vadakkumkur dynasty (1600 – 1750 CE) ===
Vadakkumkur was the northern branch of the erstwhile province of Vempolinadu which attained political autonomy in 1102 CE after the collapse of the Chera Perumals of Mahodayapuram. The rulers of this dynasty were also known by the titles Bimbaleeshas and Manikandas in the contemporary Sanskrit works just like their Thekkumkur counterparts. The kingdom of Vadakkumkur originally included the modern-day Taluks of Ettumanoor and Vaikom along with a portion of the Meenachil Taluk.

Keezhmalanadu merged with the Vadakkumkur dynasty around 1600 CE. Afterwards the Vadakkumkur kings often used to reside at Karikode near Thodupuzha, which was originally the headquarters of the Keezhmalanadu. Vadakkumkur was a vassal state of the Kingdom of Cochin during that time. Vadakkumkur's western boundary was extended up to the Vembanad lake and the eastern boundary was the Western Ghats, which bordered with the medieval Pandyan country and the later territory of the Madurai Nayak dynasty. The Dutch Malabar who became an influential power in the territory of Vadakkumkur during the 17th century CE and the first half of the 18th century CE had trade centres in Vadakkumkur.

Vadakkumkur Raja was a part of the combined military alliance formed by the kingdoms of Odanad (Kayamkulam), Thekkumkur, and Cochin against the expansion of Travancore into the northern territories. As a result, Anizham Thirunal Marthanda Varma, the architect of the modern Travancore, attacked and annexed Vadakkumkur in 1750. The Vadakkumkur Raja sought asylum in the kingdom of the Zamorin of Calicut.

=== Thekkumkur dynasty (1102–1749 CE) ===
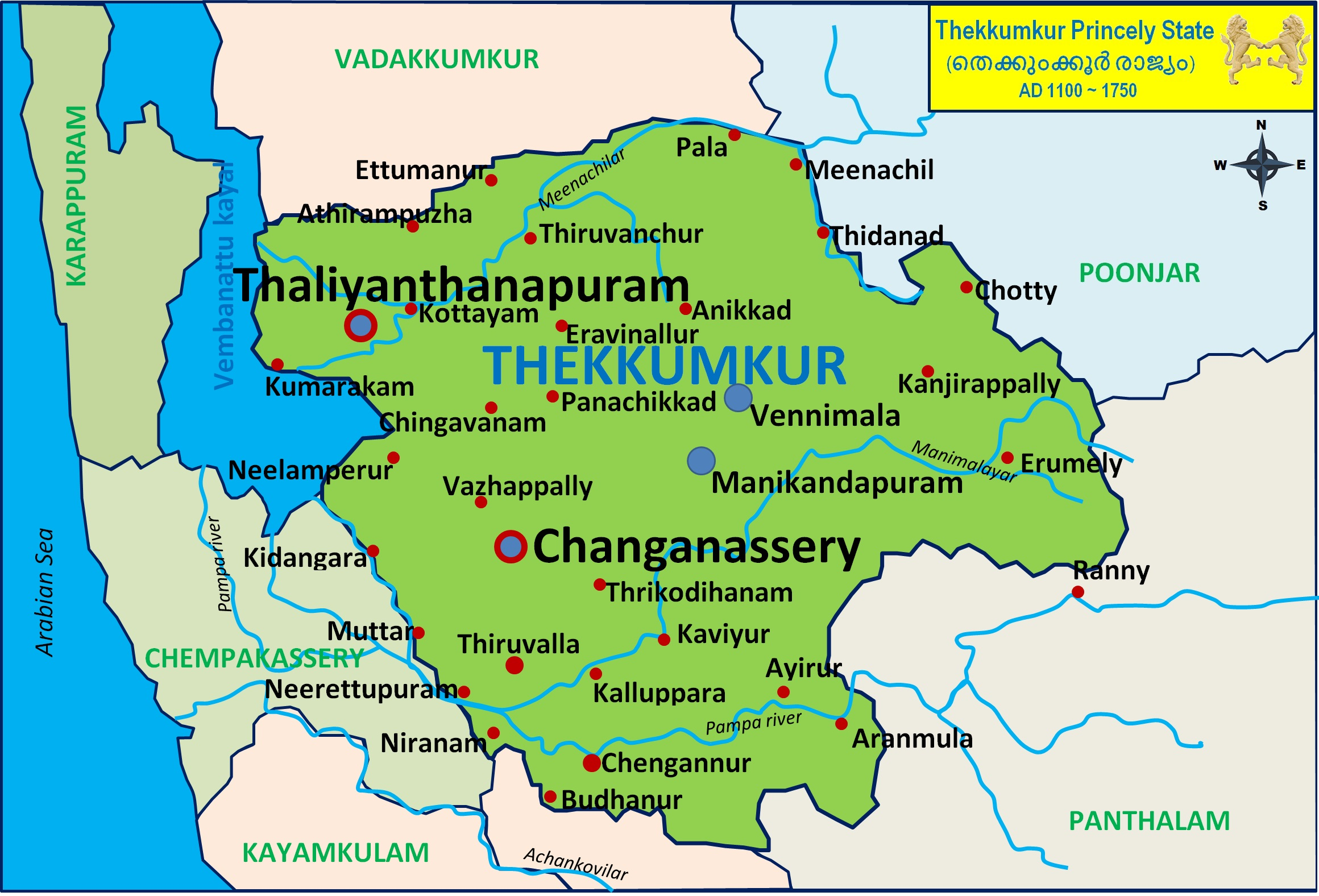
Map of Thekkumkur kingdom after the separation of the Poonjar dynasty.

It is presumed that a major portion of the High Range region in Idukki district belonged to the Thekkumkur dynasty just after the collapse the Chera Perumals of Mahodayapuram. The province Vempolinadu (Bimbali Desam) of the Chera Perumals of Mahodayapuram attained political autonomy in 1102 CE following the Chera-Chola wars of the 11th century CE. The Vempolinadu royal family got evolved into two independent branches by the 12th century CE – the southern branch among them later came to be known as the kingdom of Thekkumkur. It included the modern-day Taluks of Changanassery, Kanjirappally, Kottayam, and Thiruvalla, along with the High Range region of Idukki district.

The High Range region was later handed over to the Poonjar dynasty by the Thekkumkur Rajas. The Dutch East India Company was attracted by enormous growth of black pepper in the High Ranges of the Idukki district. According to the treaty signed on 16 June 1664, Dutch Malabar had trade contracts with the Thekkumkur Rajas on spices, cinnamon, opium, etc.

The Thekkumkur Rajas allied with the Kingdom of Cochin and the Kingdom of Odanad (Kayamkulam) against the military invasions of the kingdom of Travancore into its northern kingdoms that occurred during the 1740s. As a result, Anizham Thirunal Marthanda Varma, the architect of the modern Travancore, attacked and annexed the kingdom of Thekkumkur into Travancore in 1749 during the Battle of Changanassery, after his annexation of Kayamkulam in 1746. The Thekkumkur king took refuge in the kingdom of the Zamorin of Calicut following his defeat in the battle.

=== Poonjar dynasty (1160–1750 CE) ===
In 1157 CE, Kulothunga Chola, who belonged to the lineage of the Medieval Cholas, entered into a war with Manavikrama Kulasekhara Perumal, who belonged to the Pandya dynasty of Madurai. Upon the failure in the battle, Manavikrama appointed his brother Maravarman Sreevallabha as the monarch of the Pandya dynasty and left Madurai with his family and some of his trusted servants. Manavikrama crossed the Western Ghats and sought political asylum in Kerala. The ruler of Thekkumkur awarded him a portion of the Meenachil taluk which included the region of Poonjar along with the High Range region in the Idukki district in 1160 CE, which originally belonged to the Thekkumkur Rajas. This incident commenced the beginning of the Poonjar dynasty in the region. The territory of Poonjar was annexed by the Kingdom of Travancore following the annexation of the principalities of Thekkumkur and Vadakkumkur in 1749–1750.

=== Travancore Era (1750–1947) ===
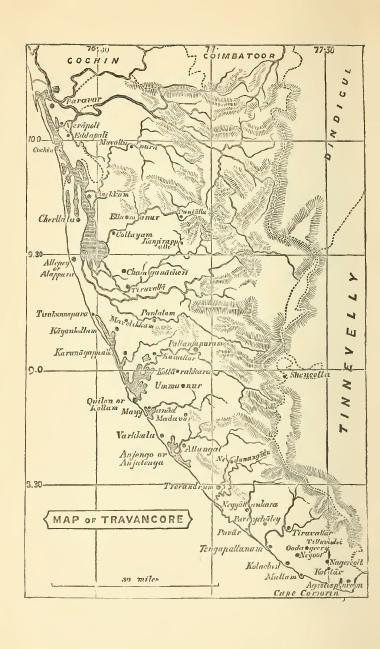
A map of the British Princely state of Travancore published in 1871

Entire portion of the modern-day district of Idukki became part of the erstwhile British Princely state of Travancore by 1750 CE. This era marked considerable progress and social reformation in all spheres. The social development indicators like the literacy rate were improved considerably during this period. After the Stone Age people and tribals, Anchunadan Tamils migrated to Idukki, Then Travancore farmers, Tamil workers and the Britishers migrated to Idukki. The Cardamom Proclamation of 1822, issued by the Rani Uthrittathi Thirunal Gowri Parvathi Bayi, the regent of the British Princely state of Travancore at that time, paved the way for bringing people from outside for collecting Cardamom from the forest of the Cardamom Hills in the district. The proclamation, issued on Malayalam Era 15 Medam 997 (which corresponds to CE 28 April 1822), entrusted Tamil workers from neighbouring districts of the Madras Presidency with harvesting cardamom in the region.

The Kannan Devan Hills on the High Range region were given on lease on 11 July 1877 by the ruler of the Poonjar dynasty to John Daniel Munroe from London and for tea plantations. This created an influx of a large number of migrant Tamil plantation workers into the region from the neighbouring districts of the Madras Presidency as well as from various parts of Southern Travancore especially from Kanyakumari district and Shenkottai taluk and the linguistic demographics in the Taluks of Devikulam taluk and Peerumedu taluk underwent a significant transformation during the last decades of the 19th century CE. Earlier the region was inhabited by various aboriginal tribes like Malavedas, Malayarayas, Muthuvans, and Paliyans, and was sparsely populated. The land and the plantations were later resumed by the Government of Kerala through the Kannan Devan Hills (Resumption Of Lands) Act, 1971.

Munnar has acted as the summer residence of the British residents in Travancore. Tradition states that Colonel Arthur Wellesley, 1st Duke of Wellington, was the first British man to pass through Munnar during Tipu Sultan's campaign into Travancore in the last decades of the 18th century CE, but this is unsubstantiated. The first survey of the terrain was undertaken by Benjamin Swayne Ward in 1816–1817, who followed the Periyar River into the Western Ghats and established a camp at the confluence of three rivers, from which the name of Munnar is derived.

Munroe, Henry Turn, and his half-brother A W Turner, obtained ownership of the Cardamom Hills from the Raja of Travancore and began clearing forest around Devikulam in 1879. Munroe formed the North Travancore Land Planting & Agricultural Society in 1879. Soon many other Europeans began establishing tea plantations in the area throughout the 1880s, after A H Sharp, a European planter entered into tea cultivation in the region. Early plantations had few facilities and were mainly huts of straw.

In 1897, a separate company, Kannan Devan Hills Corporation (KDHC), was registered to operate the tea estates which was later taken over by the American Direct Tea Trading Company Ltd., who owned 26 estates, most with coffee and some with Cinchona, almost all in the area except for a few in the lower areas. The former Kundala Valley Railway through Munnar, established in 1902, was destroyed by the Great flood of 99 that occurred in 1924 across the modern-day state of Kerala. Many dams were constructed in Idukki district during the Travancore rule in the region. The transportation facility through the dense forests of Idukki was also improved during the period. The controversial Mullaperiyar Dam was also constructed during the period.

During the Travancorean administration, the British Princely state of Travancore was divided into four revenue divisions- the Northern division headquartered at Kottayam, the Central division headquartered at Kollam, the Southern division headquartered at Thiruvananthapuram, and the High Range division with its headquarters at Devikulam.

The High Range division in the northeastern part of Travancore included the Taluks of Devikulam and Peerumade. Thodupuzha region was however included in the northernmost division of the British Princely state of Travancore. Kottayam was the headquarters of the northernmost revenue division in Travancore which also included the Taluks of North Paravur, Kunnathunad, Muvattupuzha, Meenachil, Changanassery, Kottayam, Vaikom, and Cherthala in 1931, in addition to Thodupuzha.

=== Post Independence (1947–present) ===
At the time of the integration of the state of Travancore and Cochin into the state of Travancore-Cochin in 1949 following the integration of the British Princely states of Travancore and Cochin into the Dominion of India, the erstwhile revenue divisions were reorganised into districts and the Divan Peshkars gave way to District Collectors, paving the way for the birth of the Kottayam district on 1 July 1949, which had also included the modern-day district of Idukki in it.

The erstwhile Kingdom of Cochin was reorganized into Thrissur district and Taluks of North Paravur and Kunnathunad were transferred to that district. Similarly the Cherthala Taluk was transferred into the newly formed Kollam district on 1 July 1949. The High Range division of the erstwhile Travancore was merged with the remaining Taluks of the erstwhile Kottayam division to form the Kottayam district as a part of the inauguration of the new Indian state of Travancore-Cochin on 1 July 1949. The new district of Kottayam at that time contained eight Taluks – Changanassery, Kottayam, Vaikom, Meenachil, Muvattupuzha, Thodupuzha, Devikulam, and Peermade. Hence Idukki was a part of the Kottayam district at the time of the formation of the state Kerala in 1956.

Apart from the Padmanabhapuram Division (present Kanyakumari district), the Devikulam division of Travancore in present-day Idukki district had a slight Tamil-majority in the late 1940s. Pattom Thanu Pillai was the chief minister for Thiru - Kochi legislative assembly. He engaged hard measures against the agitations of Tamils . Especially the Tamils at Devikulam - Peerumedu regions went through the atrocities of Travancore Police force. Since the Travancore Government did not pay attention to their representation, the T.T.N.C.(Travancore Tamilnadu Congress) observed 30th June 1954 as 'Liberation Day' in all Tamil areas. Observed peacefully by holding public meetings and passing resolutions the Travancore Tamils expressed their apathy. A public meeting was organised at Munnar by T.T.N.C leaders from Nagercoil, A. Nesamony, Abdul Razaak and A Chidambaranatha Nadar arrived there on 3rd July 1954. But the police forbade them to enter meeting place at Munnar. When the leaders defied the order ban, they were arrested and sentenced to six weeks imprisonment. To protest against the arrest of Tamil leaders, the hartals were organised in all Tamil areas of Travancore. The agitation organized at Munnar led clashes between locals and police force, the police opened fire and two labours were martyred,led to an uncalm atmosphere prevailed in South Travancore. The Travancore Tamil Nadu Congress (TTNC) had requested to merge it with the Madras State as a part of the upcoming States Reorganization Act of 1956. However, The 1951 Linguistic Census of Travancore-Cochin noted that in Devikulam division, nearly three-fourths of the Tamil-speaking population were born outside the state. The report observed that a majority of them had migrated from the Madras Presidency, having been brought in as plantation labours to the Cardamom Hills during British rule.

Furthermore, some quick decisions were taken by Pattom Thanu Pillai, who was the first prime minister of Travancore, to ensure that the division of Cardamom Hills will retain in the modern-state of Kerala, as the region had a greater economic importance in the future coastal state of Kerala. Pattom had launched an ambitious project to alter the demography of the slight Tamil majority division of Devikulam in Travancore, present day taluks of Devikulam, Peermade and Udumbanchola. Called the Colonisation Project, the plan was to relocate 8,000 Malayalam speaking agriculture families with no government employment to the high ranges for the cultivation of cash crops, predominantly from Kottayam, Ernakulam and Thrissur regions of Central Travancore. And few Malayali farmers from the neighbouring Malabar district of Madras Presidency . 50,000 acres, in various areas of these Tamil majority taluks, were measured and set apart for colonisation. Of this 10,000 acres were for utilities like schools, hospitals, police stations, roads, grazing lands and other government officers. The remaining 40,000 acres were divided into 8000 blocks of five acres each.

Besides the five acres given on an eternal lease arrangement, each volunteering family was also granted Rs 2000 as interest-free loan to begin cultivation. At that point, the Tamil population constituted 72 per cent and 44 per cent of Devikulam and Peermade respectively who were predominantly immigrants from neighboring Madras state.

The central government had appointed Fazal Ali Commission (December 1953) for the states reorganisation based on language. It submitted its report on 10 August 1955. Based on this report, Devikulam – Peermade and Neyyattinkara Taluks were merged with the newly formed Kerala state. On 1 November 1956 – four Taluks Thovalai, Agastheeswaram, Kalkulam, Vilavancode were recognised to form the New Kanyakumari District and merged with Tamil Nadu State. Half of Sengottai Taluk was merged with Tirunelveli District. The main demand of TTNC was to merger the Tamil regions with Tamil Nadu and major part of its demand was realised. So TTNC was dissolved thereafter.

Following the formation of the new Indian state of Kerala according to the States Reorganisation Act, 1956, many jurisdictional changes were done in the state. Two new Taluks, namely Kanjirappally (from Changanassery and Thiruvalla) and Udumbanchola (from Devikulam and Peerumede) were carved out on 1 October 1956 in the Kottayam district. After a month, a new Taluk called Kuttanad was carved out from Changanassery and Ambalappuzha. The Kuttanad Taluk was transferred into the newly formed Alappuzha district on 17 August 1957. The Taluks of Thodupuzha and Muvattupuzha were transferred into the newly formed Ernakulam district on 1 April 1958.

The land and the plantations in the Kannan Devan Hills in the High range region were resumed by the Government of Kerala through the Kannan Devan Hills (Resumption Of Lands) Act, 1971. On 26 January 1972, the district of Idukki was formed by the separation of the three High Range Taluks, namely Devikulam, Udumbanchola, and Peerumede, from Kottayam district. The High Range region was merged with the Thodupuzha taluk of Ernakulam district to form the district of Idukki. It was the largest district of Kerala by area at that time. In 1998, Kuttampuzha village was transferred into the Ernakulam district, making Idukki the second largest district in Kerala, only after to Palakkad.

The High Range region is still sparsely populated and various cash crops and spices are extensively cultivated there. Now various hydroelectric power projects in the district of Idukki contributes around 66% of the total power needs of Kerala. The Mullaperiyar Dam still remains as the source of the interstate dispute between Kerala and Tamil Nadu. In September 2023, Idukki regained its status as the largest district in the state after the addition of 12718.5095 hectares of land which was a part of Kutampuzha village in Ernakulam district to Idamalakudi village in Idukki.

== Geography ==
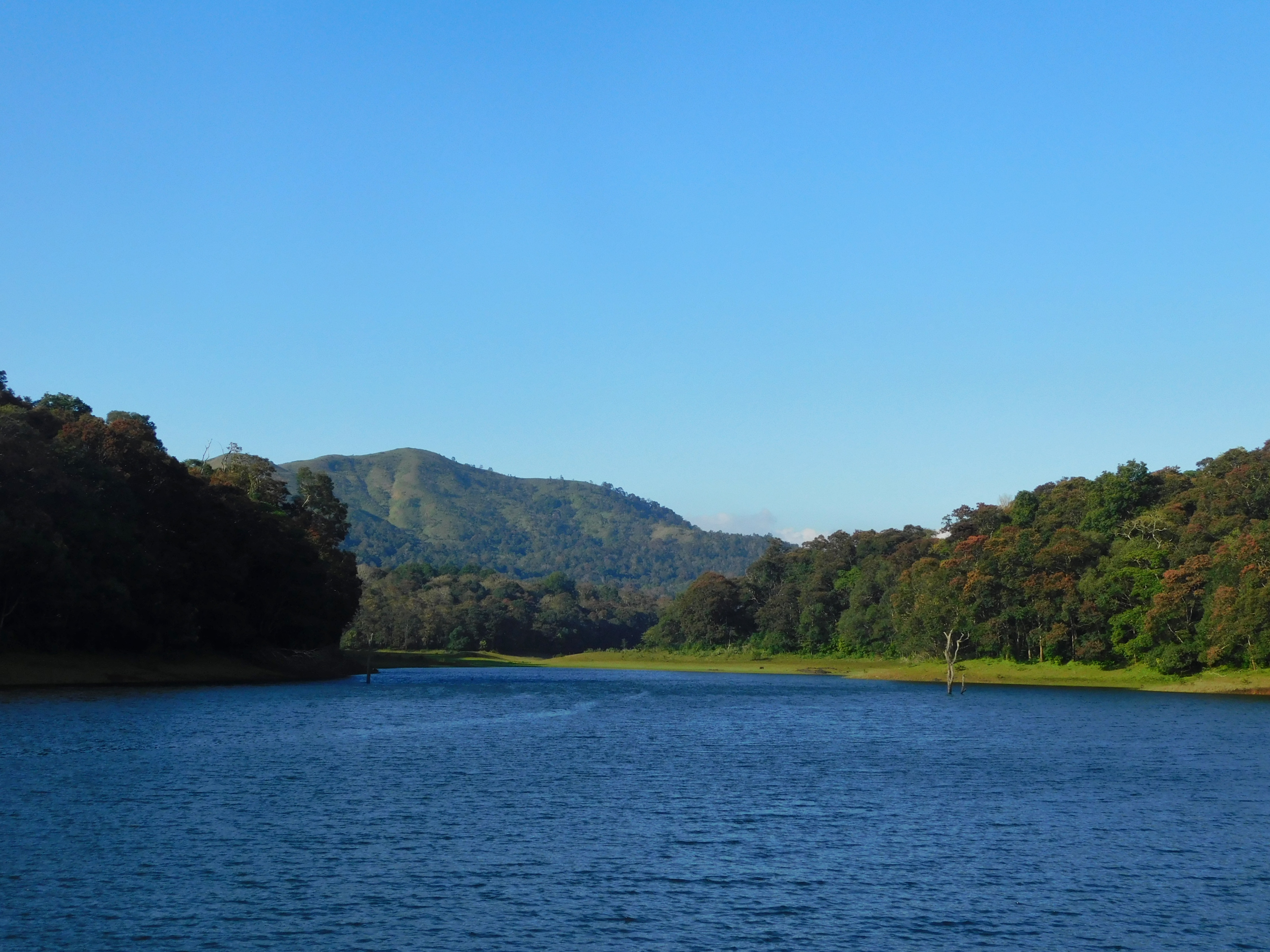
Thekkady

The Idukki district forms a high altitude plateau with rugged mountainous terrain, several river valleys and deep gorges. The entire northern part of the district forms a sub plateau higher than the rest of the district, this region includes the tallest peaks like Anamudi and includes the areas around Munnar, Pallivasal, Kanthalloor, Vattavada and Mankulam. The Pambar river valley (Marayoor, Keezhanthoor) forms an eastern sloping rain shadow region of the Western Ghats. The eastern frontier of the district (Kumily, Kattappana, Nedumkandam, Rajakumari and Ramakkalmedu) constitutes the Cardamon hills. The western part of the district is covered by forests and hills bordering the eastern regions of Ernakulam and Kottayam district like Neriyamangalam, Vannapuram, Thommankuthu, Moolamattom, Vagamon and Kuttikanam. Places like Thodupuzha, Koothattukulam, Udumbanoor and Muttom are situated in the semi elevated Thodupuzha River plains with scattered hills. The Periyar river basin in the district which includes Vandiperiyar, Ayyapankoil, Rajakkad, Idukki, Cheruthoni and Adimaly is an elevated plateau crisscrossed by river valleys and lies between the high peaks of the western and eastern parts of the district. The southern region is entirely covered with the forests of the Periyar National Park.

Anamudi and Meesapulimala, the two highest peaks in India south of the Himalayas, are located in Idukki district. Anamudi is situated in the Kuttampuzha Panchayat of Adimali Block in the Kannan Devan Hills village of Devikulam taluk. Thirteen other peaks in the district exceed a height of 2,000 m (6,600 ft). Periyar, Thodupuzhayar, Muthirappuzhayar, and Thalayar are the important rivers of the district. Idukki Dam, Asia's largest arch dam, is located in the Idukki Township. The dam is located at the point where the Periyar flows through the gorge formed between two high and massive rocks known as 'Kuravan' and 'Kurathi'.

=== Climate change ===
Idukki has a large area of dense forest cover and shola forests. It is highly vulnerable to floods and drought and is considered a climate change hotspot in Kerala, along with the districts of Alappuzha, Palakkad, and Wayanad. Researchers attribute the increasing frequency of landslides in Idukki to climate change and deforestation. Changes in rainfall patterns caused by climate change, coupled with deforestation and large-scale construction projects, are among the contributing factors that led to the August 2020 landslide that killed 65 people, including plantation workers.

== Demographics ==
Historical population
Year	Pop.	±% p.a.
1901	47,666	—
1911	99,564	+7.64%
1921	108,751	+0.89%
1931	187,680	+5.61%
1941	244,296	+2.67%
1951	331,422	+3.10%
1961	574,844	+5.66%
1971	758,166	+2.81%
1981	955,241	+2.34%
1991	1,055,023	+1.00%
2001	1,129,221	+0.68%
2011	1,108,974	−0.18%
2018	1,093,156	−0.21%

According to the 2018 Statistics Report, Idukki district has a population of 1,093,156. The 2011 Census places it at 416th among the 640 districts of India. The district has a population density of 251 inhabitants per square kilometre (650/sq mi). Its population growth rate over the decade 2001–2011 was −1.93% due to emigration and low fertility rates. Idukki has a sex ratio of 1,006 females for every 1,000 males, and a literacy rate of 92.2 percent. 4.69% of the population lives in urban areas. Scheduled Castes and Scheduled Tribes make up 13.12% and 5.03% of the population respectively.

Distribution of Language by Division of Travancore (1881)
Name of Division	Malayalam (%)	Tamil (%)
Cottayam Division	95.19	3.65
Devicolam Division	36.18	59.14

Languages by Taluks (1881)
Name of Taluk		Total population	Malayalam		Tamil		Others	
1	Cardamom Hills	6,228	2,253	36.18%	3,683	59.14%	292	4.69%
2	Todupulay	24,321	23,227	95.50%	1,085	4.46%	9	0.04%

Languages of Idukki district (2011)
1. Malayalam (82.0%)
2. Tamil (17.5%)
3. Others (0.55%)

Malayalam and English are the two official administrative languages in the district. Around four-fifth of the people in Idukki district speak Malayalam as their mother tongue. The Taluks of Devikulam, Peerumedu and Udumbanchola have a considerable Tamil minority population. However Malayalis are majority in these taluks as well. The aboriginal tribes in the district speak their own dialects such as Malavedan, Malaryan, Muthuvan, and Paliyan, which are closely related to the Malayalam and Tamil.

Until the late 1940s, Devikulam, and Peermade had a slight Tamil majority when it was sparsely populated. Following the States Reorganisation Act of 1956, a colonization project initiated by Pattom Thanu Pillai was implemented to change the demographics by relocating Malayalam-speaking families, ensuring the region remained with the new state of Kerala.

=== Religion ===
Religions in Idukki district (2011)
Religion	Percent
Hinduism	48.86%
Christianity	43.42%
Islam	7.41%
Other or not stated	0.31%

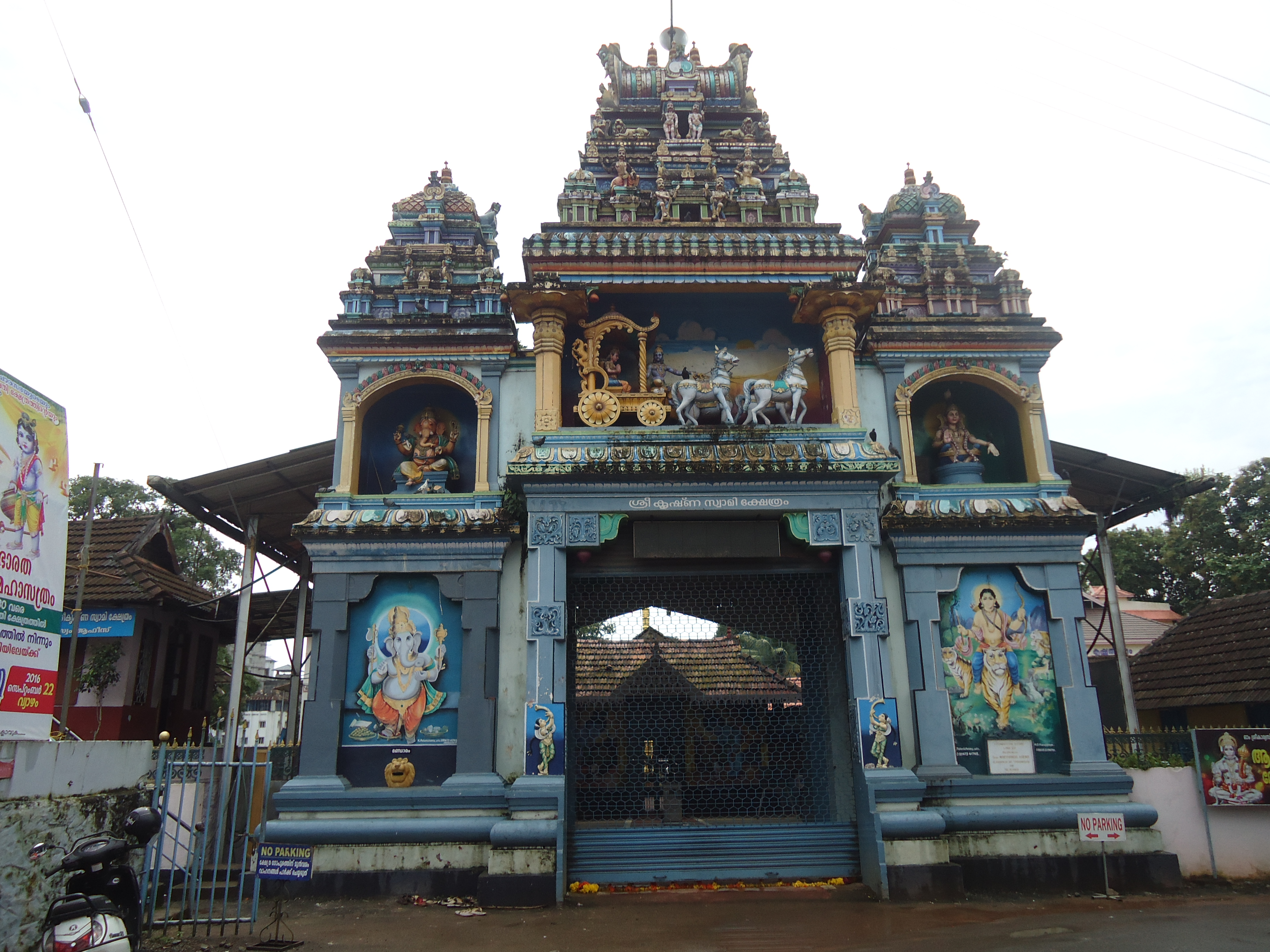
Sree Krishna Swami Temple, Thodupuzha

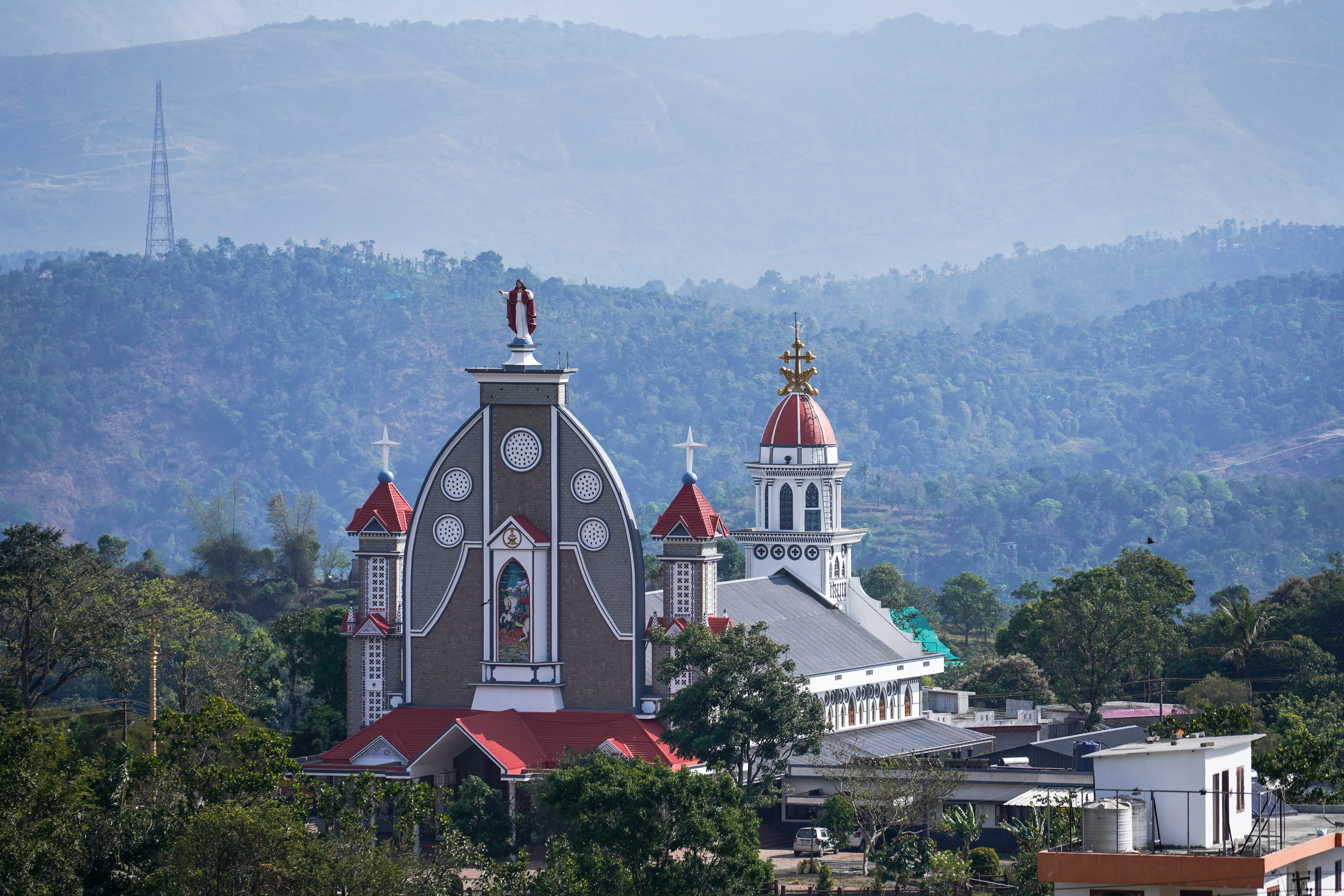
Calvary Mount Church, Narakakanam

According to the 2011 census, Hindus make up 48.86% (541,854) of the population, with Christians at 43.42% (481,507) and Muslims at 7.41% (82,206).

Religions in taluks
Talukas	Hindus	Christians	Muslims	Others
Devikulam	63.21	30.50	6.08	0.21
Udumbanchola	48.14	48.32	3.15	0.39
Thodupuzha	40.57	45.15	14.03	0.25
Peerumade	51.51	41.28	6.91	0.3

== Technology ==
Idukki district was the first in India to get connected to a super-fast broad band system as a part of the Digital India campaign. It was also the first to get BSNL 4G in whole country, taking the number of 4G operators in the district to four, including Vodafone Idea Ltd, Jio, and Bharti Airtel.

== Tourism ==
=== Munnar ===
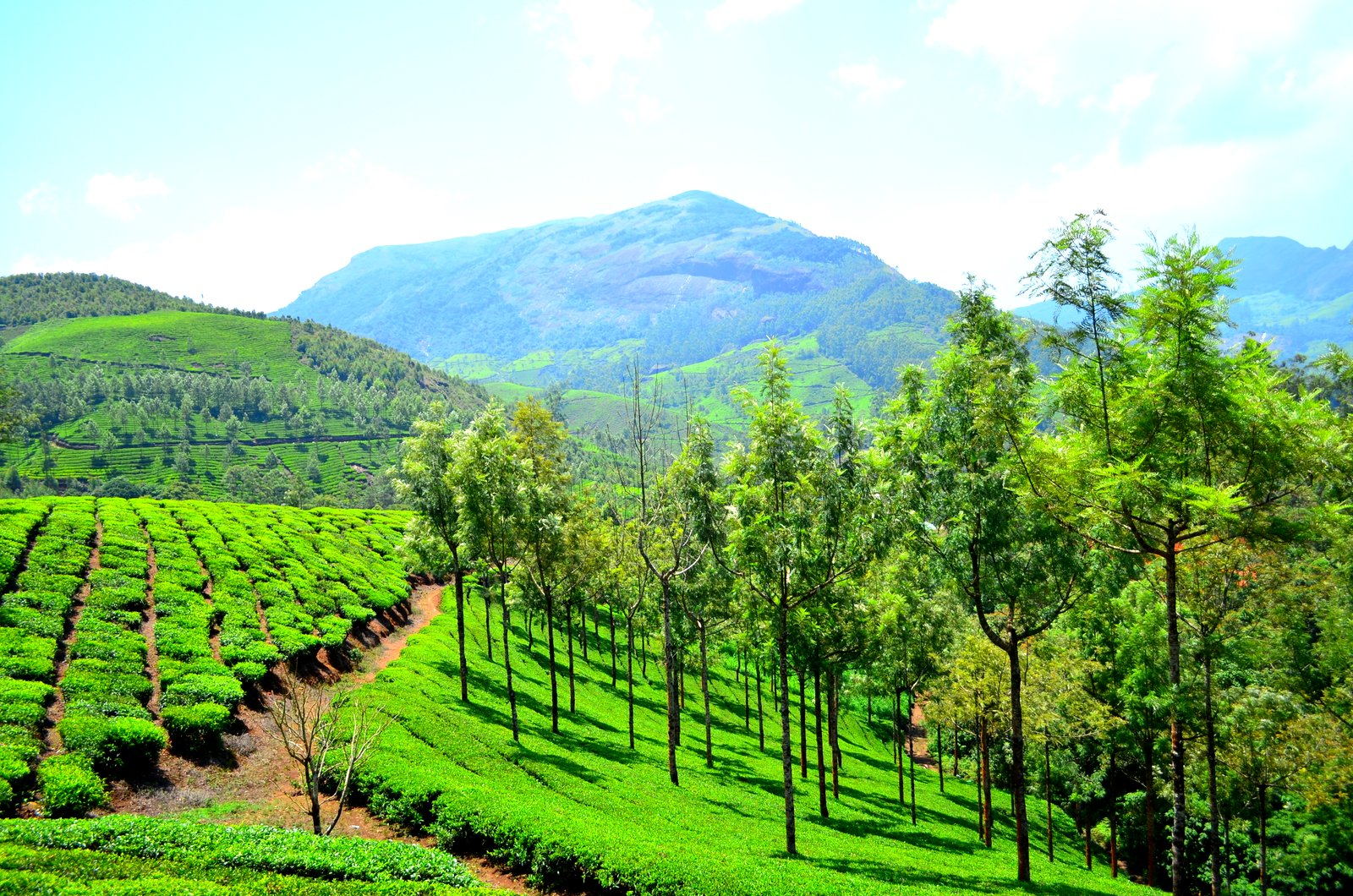
Tea plantations in Munnar

Munnar was the summer resort of the British Government in the south. The town is situated at the convergence of three mountain streams, namely Muthirappuzha, Nallathanni, and Kundala. Munnar has some of the largest tea plantations in the world. This hill station, which is more than 5,000 feet above sea level, is a tourist attraction noted for its scenic landscapes. Most of the native flora and fauna of Munnar have disappeared due to severe habitat fragmentation resultant from the creation of the plantations. However, some species continue to survive and thrive in several protected areas nearby, including the new Kurinjimala Sanctuary to the east, the Chinnar Wildlife Sanctuary, Manjampatti Valley, and the Amaravati reserve forest of Indira Gandhi Wildlife Sanctuary to the northeast, the Eravikulam National Park and Anamudi Shola National Park in the north, and the Pampadum Shola National Park to the south. The Palani Hills National Park is proposed to come up to the east of Idukki. These protected areas are especially known for several threatened and endemic species including the Nilgiri tahr, the grizzled giant squirrel, the Nilgiri wood-pigeon, the elephant, the gaur, the Nilgiri langur, the sambar, and the neelakurinji (that blossoms only once in twelve years).

The former Kundala Valley Railway in Munnar was destroyed by a flood in 1924, but tourism officials are considering reconstructing the railway line to attract tourists.

=== Wildlife sanctuaries ===
==== Idukki Wildlife Sanctuary ====
Idukki Wildlife Sanctuary came into existence in 1976. It is located in the Thodupuzha and Udumbanchola taluks in Idukki district. It has an area of 105.364sq.km. The altitude ranges from 450 to 1272 m. The highest peak is Vanjur Medu (1272m).

The major rivers flowing through the area are the Periyar and the Cheruthoniar.

==== Eravikulam Wild Life Sanctuary ====
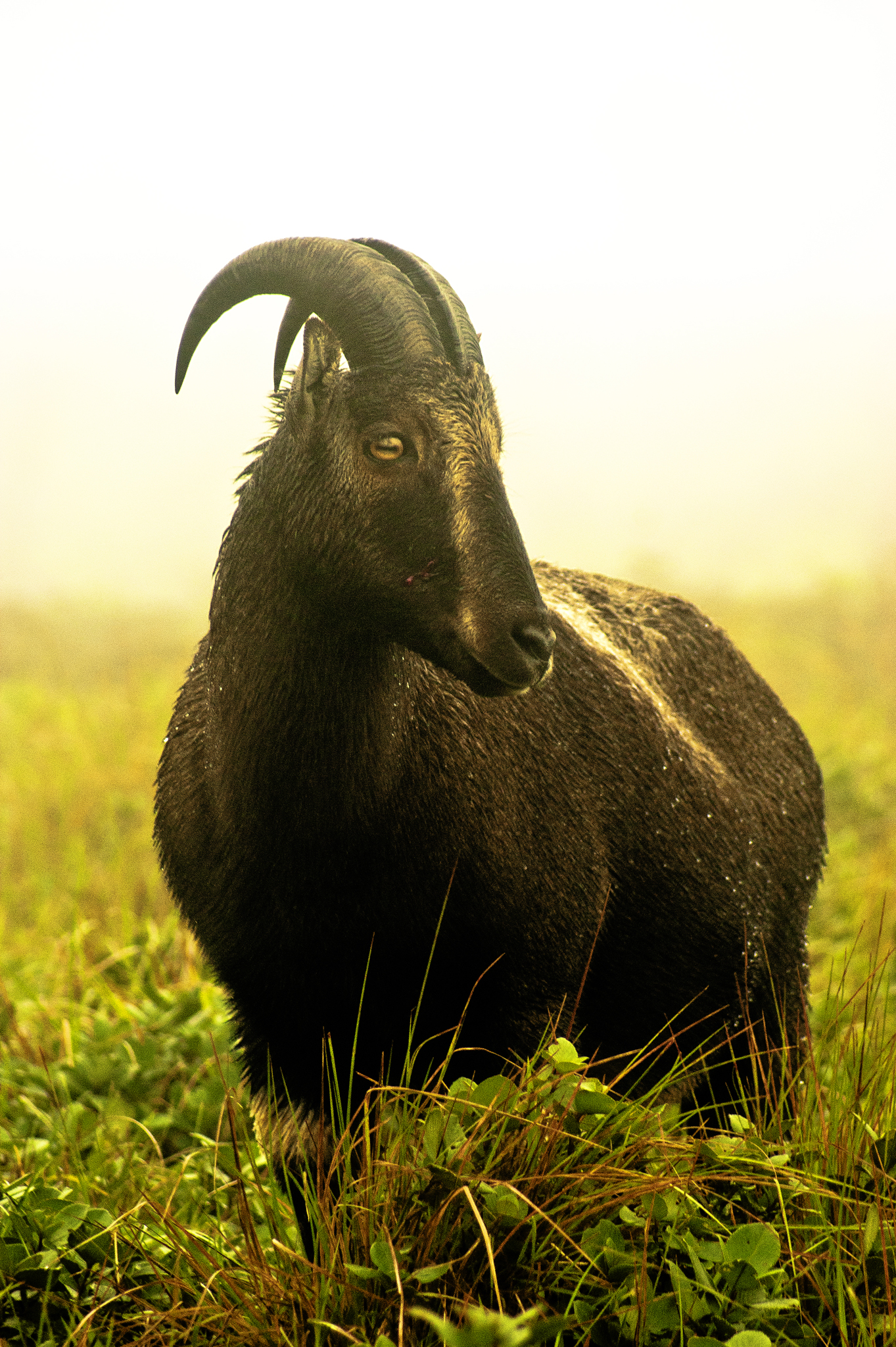
Nilagiri Tahr

Eravikulam is another wildlife sanctuary proclaimed as a National Park. It supports the largest population of Nilgiri tahr in the world. Anamudi peak is on the southern part of this park. Most of the park is grassland and the average altitude is more than 5000 feet above sea level. Heavy rain and gushing winds make the area inaccessible during the monsoon season. The famous Neelakurinji (Strobilanthes kunthiana) grows here. It has a flowering cycle of 12 years. Twenty-six species of mammals have been recorded in the park including the largest surviving population of Nilgiri tahr, estimated at 750 individuals. The other ungulates are gaur, Indian muntjac and sambar deer. Golden jackal, jungle cat, wild dog, dhole, leopard and tiger are the main predators. Some little-known animals such as Nilgiri langur, stripe-necked mongoose, Indian porcupine, Nilgiri marten, small clawed otter, ruddy mongoose, and dusky palm squirrel are also found. Elephants make seasonal visits.

132 species of birds have been recorded which include endemics like black-and-orange flycatcher, Nilgiri pipit, Nilgiri wood pigeon, white bellied shortwing, Nilgiri flycatcher and Kerala laughingthrush.

Endemic butterflies confined to the shola-grass land ecosystem like the red disk bushbrown and Palni four-wing are among the 101 species in the park.

==== Pampadumshola National Park ====
Pampadum Shola National Park is the smallest national park in Kerala state, South India. The park is administered by the Kerala Department of Forests and Wildlife, Munnar Wildlife Division, together with the nearby Mathikettan Shola National Park, Eravikulam National Park, Anamudi Shola National Park, Chinnar Wildlife Sanctuary and the Kurinjimala Sanctuary. The park adjoins the Allinagaram Reserved Forest within the proposed Palani Hills Wildlife Sanctuary and National Park. The Western Ghats, Anamalai sub-cluster, including these parks, is under consideration by the UNESCO World Heritage Committee for selection as a World Heritage Site.

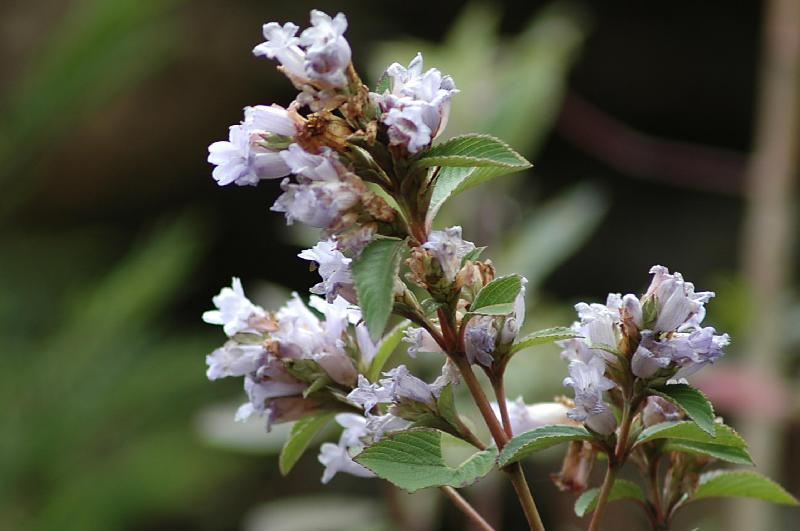
Neelakurinji

==== Kurinjimala Sanctuary ====
Kurinjimala Sanctuary protects the approximately 32 km^{2} core habitat of the endangered Neelakurinji plant in Kottakamboor and Vattavada villages in Devikulam Taluk, Idukki district of Kerala State in South India.

==== Protected areas ====
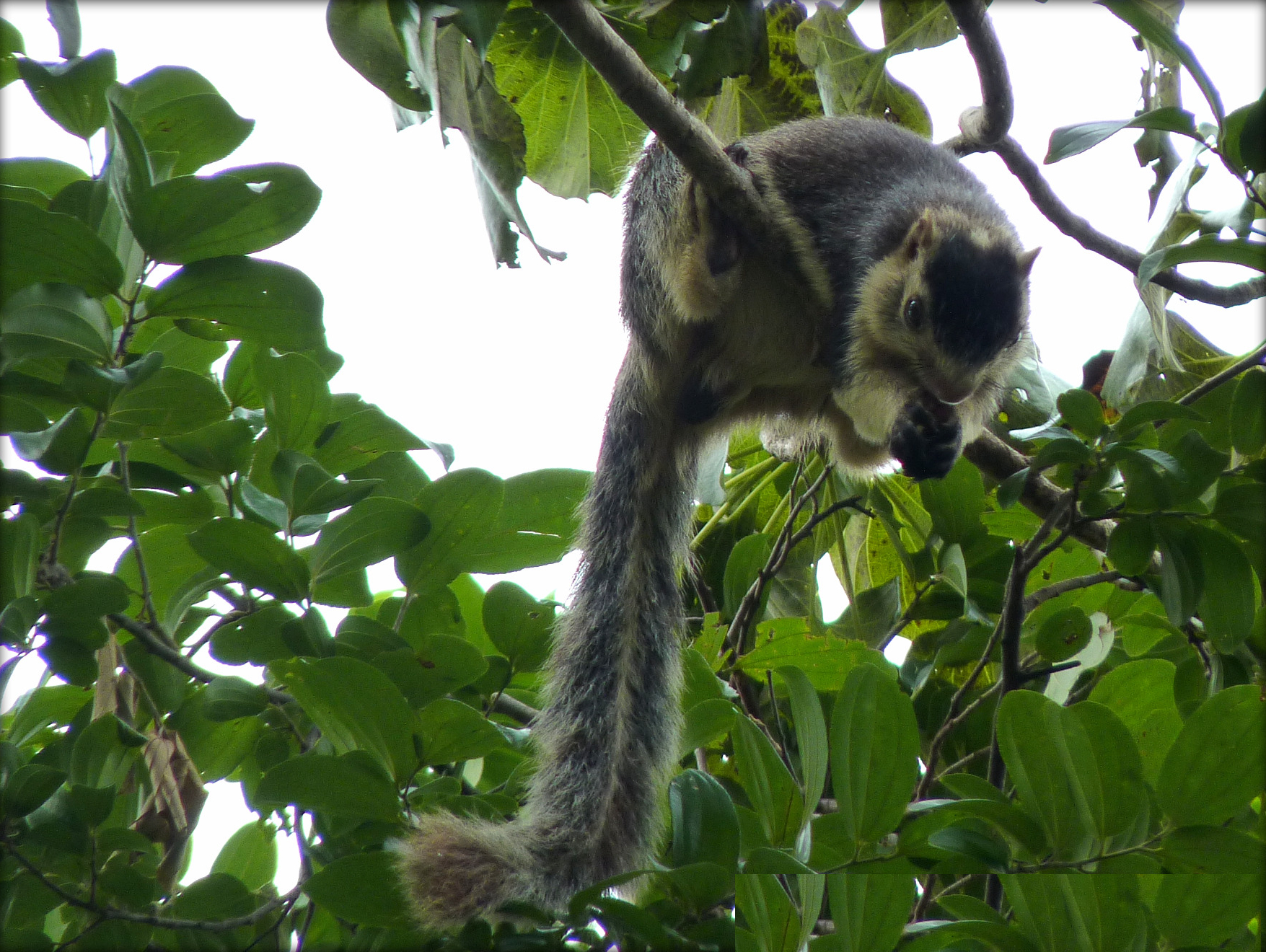
Giant grizzled squirrel

This district has several protected areas including Periyar Tiger Reserve in the south, Kurinjimala Sanctuary to the east, Chinnar Wildlife Sanctuary to the northeast, Eravikulam National Park and Anamudi Shola National Park to the north and Pampadum Shola National Park to the south. These protected areas are well known for several threatened and endemic species including tiger, Nilgiri tahr, grizzled giant squirrel, Nilgiri wood-pigeon, elephant, gaur, sambar deer, purple frog and neelakurinji.

=== Thommankuthu waterfall ===
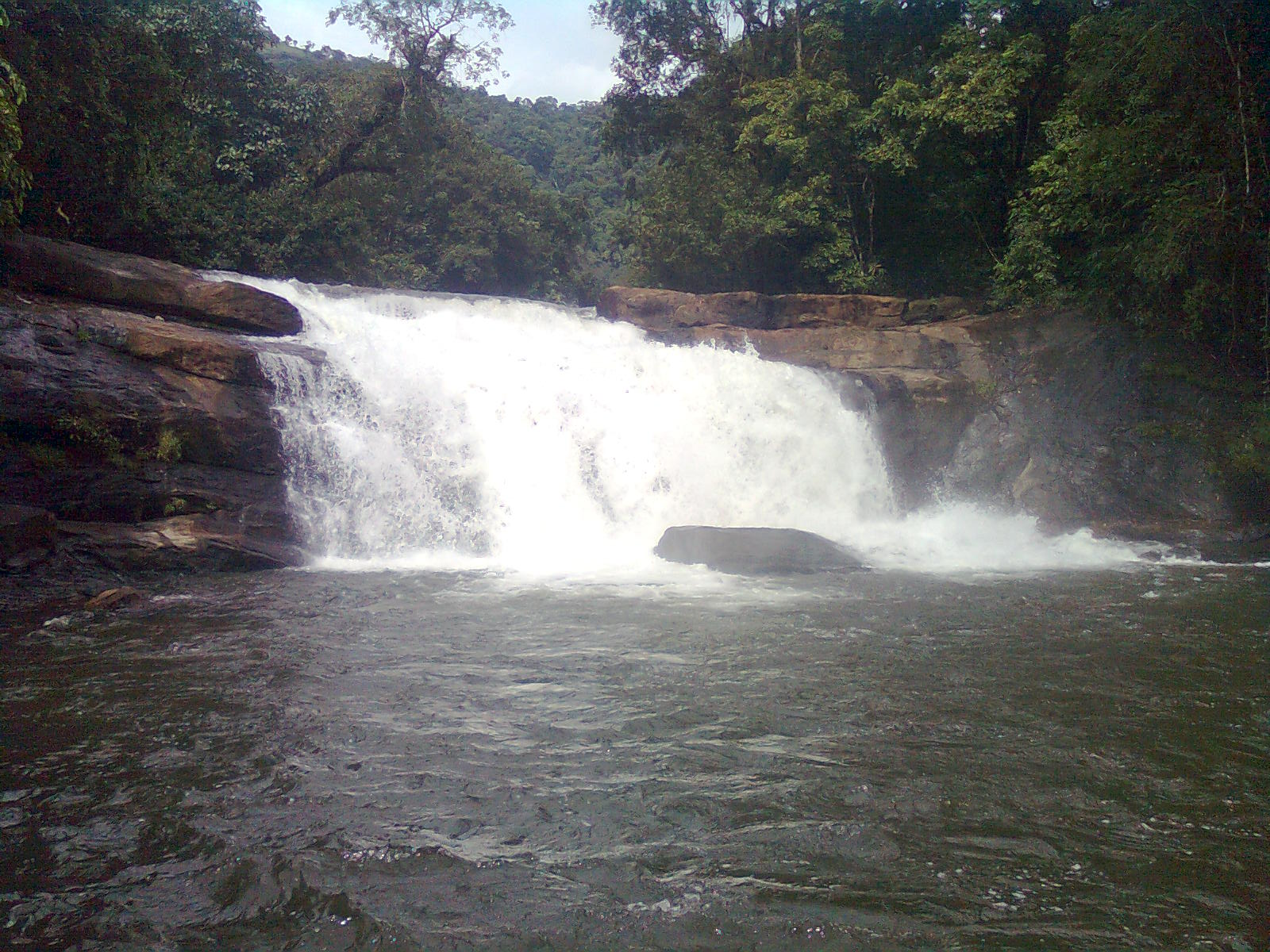
Thommankuthu Waterfalls

Thommankuthu (തൊമ്മൻകുത്ത്) is a scenic waterfall near Thodupuzha in the district. Thomankoothu waterfalls is not a single waterfall but a series of 12 falls over a distance of 5 km. It is one of the major eco-tourism centers in Idukki, Kerala.

== Administration ==
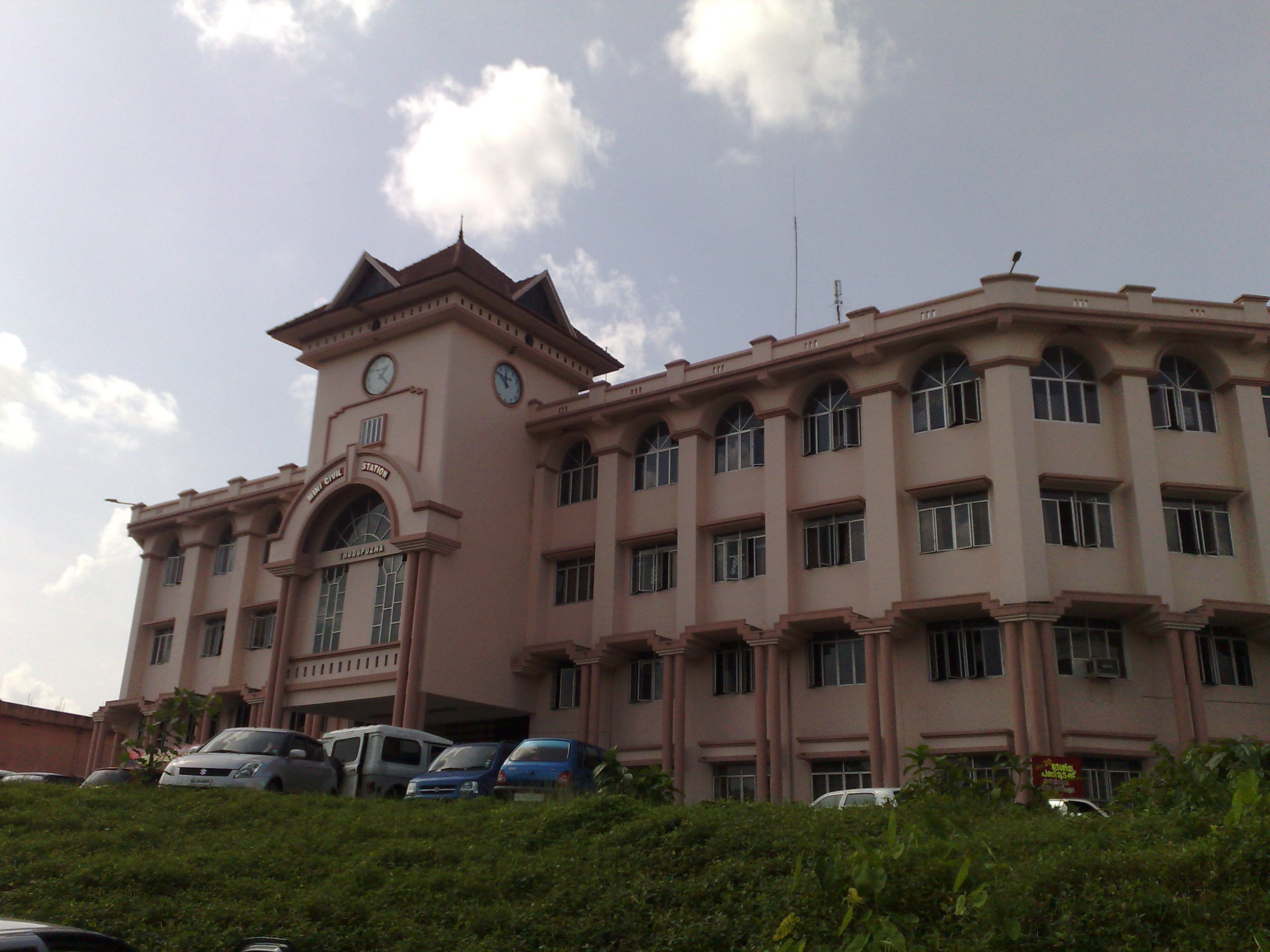
Thodupuzha Civil Station

Taluks in Idukki district with their headquarters

Painavu town is the administrative headquarters of the Idukki district. Shri.Dinesh Cheruvat IAS is the District Collector and District Magistrate, while Shri.Sreejith S IAS is the Additional District Magistrate and Deputy Collector (General). Shri.Anup Garg IAS holds as Sub Collector and Subdivsional Magistrate, Idukki and Shri. Arya VM IAS holds as Sub Collector and Subdivsional Magistrate, Devikulam. The district is divided into two revenue divisions- Idukki and Devikulam.

=== Municipal towns ===
There are 2 municipal towns in the district. They are:

- Kattappana
- Thodupuzha

=== Legislative representation ===
District	No.	Constituency	Name	Party	Alliance	Remarks
Idukki	88	Devikulam (SC)	F Raja	INC	UDF	
Idukki	89	Udumbanchola	Senapathy Venu	INC	UDF	
Idukki	90	Thodupuzha	Apu John Joseph	KC	UDF	Government Chief Whip
Idukki	91	Idukki	Roy K Paulose	INC	UDF	
Idukki	92	Peerumade	Cyriac Thomas	INC	UDF	

Idukki district is fully part of the Lok Sabha constituency of the same name.

=== Taluks ===
The district is divided into two revenue divisions which together incorporate five Taluks within them.

- Taluks in the Idukki Revenue Division are:

Thodupuzha	Idukki

- Taluks in the Devikulam Revenue Division are:

Devikulam	Udumbanchola	Peerumade

=== Revenue villages ===
Idukki district is divided into 68 revenue villages for the ease and decentralisation of its revenue administration. They are further incorporated into 5 taluks as elucidated below.

==== Thodupuzha Taluk ====
- Alacode
- Arakkulam
- Elappally
- Karikode
- Karimannoor
- Karimkunnam
- Kodikulam
- Kudayathoor
- Kumaramangalam
- Manakkad
- Muttom
- Neyyassery
- Purapuzha
- Thodupuzha
- Udumbannoor
- Vandamattom
- Vannappuram
- Velliyamattom

==== Idukki Taluk ====
- Ayyappancoil
- Idukki
- Kanchiyar
- Kanjikuzhi
- Karimannoor
- Kattappana
- Konnathady
- Thankamany
- Upputhode
- Vathikudy

==== Devikulam Taluk ====
- Anaviratty
- Bisonvalley
- Edamalakkudy
- Kannan Devan Hills
- Kanthalloor
- Keezhanthoor
- Kottakamboor
- Kunchithanny
- Mankulam
- Mannamkandam
- Marayur
- Munnar
- Pallivasal
- Vattavada
- Vellathooval

==== Udumbanchola Taluk ====
- Anakkara
- Anavilasam
- Chakkupallam
- Chathurangapara
- Chinnakanal
- Erattayar
- Kalkoonthal
- Kanthippara
- Karunapuram
- Pampadumpara
- Parathode
- Poopara
- Rajakkad
- Rajakumary
- Santhanpara
- Udumbanchola
- Vandanmedu

==== Peerumade Taluk ====
- Elappara
- Kokkayar
- Kumily
- Manjumala
- Meloram
- Mlappara
- Peerumade
- Periyar
- Peruvanthanam
- Upputhara
- Vagamon

== Culture ==
Culture in Idukki is mixed since it consists of migrated people from other parts of Kerala such as Kottayam and native tribals. The presence of a large number of tribal populations is peculiar to Idukki District. Kovilmala, near Kattappana in Idukki is home to one of the still ruling tribal kings in India, Kovilmala Raja Mannan. Kovilmala is the headquarters of Mannan community who preserves certain customs, traditions, and form of governance, making them a unique tribal unit. The system of governance here is a democratic monarchy in which a king is elected by the people to rule.

== Dams and Hydroelectric projects ==
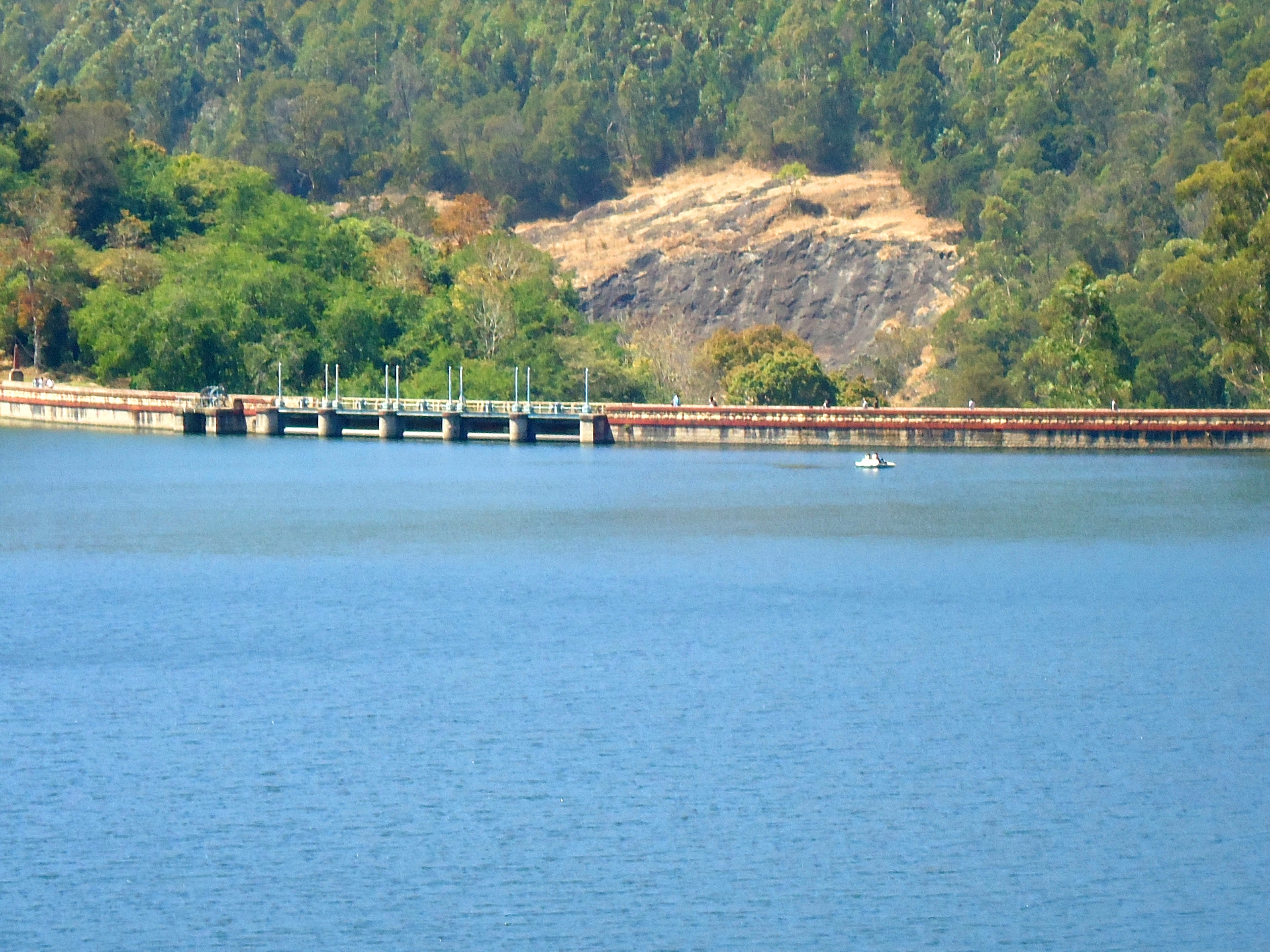
Kundala dam and lake

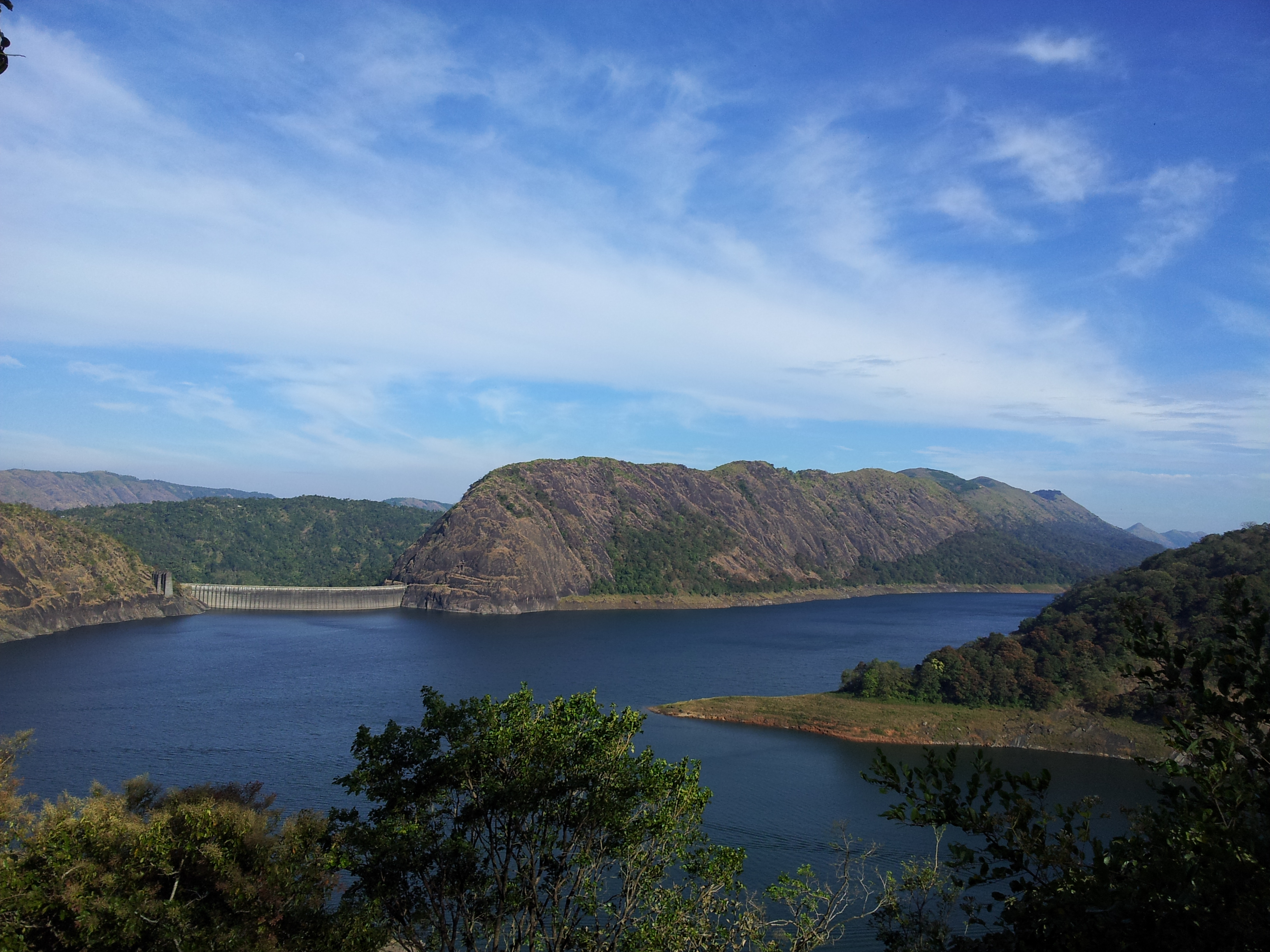
Idukki arch Dam

Around 66% of Kerala's power needs come from various Hydroelectric Power Projects in Idukki district. The first and oldest dam in Kerala is Mullaperiyar. It was inaugurated in 1895. The largest dam in Kerala is Idukki Dam, which is also one of the largest arch-dams in Asia. The dam was commissioned in 1976.

- Idukki Arch-Dam
- Cheruthoni
- Mullapperiyar
- Ponmudy
- Kallarkutty Dam
- Kundala Dam
- Mattuppetty
- Aanayirangal Dam
- Chenkulam Dam
- Lower Periyar Dam
- Malankara
- Kallar Dam (Nedumkandam)
- Kulamavu
- Munnar Head Works
- Erattayar Dam
- Uluppuni Dam
- Kochu Pamba

== Connectivity ==
=== Rail ===
At present, there is no railway in and to Idukki district of Kerala. The nearest railway stations are Kottayam (station code – KTYM), Aluva (Alwaye, station code – AWY), Ernakulam South (Ernakulam Jn., station code – ERS) and Ernakulam North (Ernakulam Town, station code – ERN). There was a rail line that existed in the district during colonial period called, Kundala Valley Railway. It got destroyed in the Great flood of 99 in 1924. The under-construction Sabarimala Railway project connecting Angamaly to Punalur will pass through the Idukki district.

=== Airports ===
Sathram Airstrip is an airstrip which was inaugurated on 17 February 2021 but there are no commercial operations happening there. Practically Cochin International Airport at Nedumbassery in Ernakulam district is the one which is nearest.

== Major Towns ==
The major towns of the district include:

- Devikulam taluk: Adimali, Devikulam, Munnar, Marayur, Kanthallur, Vattavada, Chinnakanal
- Thodupuzha taluk:Thodupuzha, Udumbanoor, Karikunnam
- Idukki taluk: Cheruthoni, Murikkassery, Kattappana, Painavu, Thopramkudy, Thankamany
- Udumbanchola taluk: Udumbanchola, Nedumkandam, Karunapuram, Vandanmedu
- Peerumed taluk: Peruvanthanam, Elappara, Upputhara, Peerumade, Vandiperiyar, Kumily, Thekkady

== Notable people ==
- T. M. Abraham
- Asif Ali
- Shaji Chen
- Lijomol Jose
- Askar Ali
- Sandra Amy
- Mathew Anikuzhikattil
- P. K. Abdul Aziz
- Sachin Baby
- K. M. Beenamol
- E. S. Bijimol
- Walter Devaram
- K. M. Binu
- Mamas K. Chandran
- Susmesh Chandroth
- Sanal Edamaruku
- Joice George
- Jaffar Idukki
- P. J. Joseph
- Sebastian Kappen
- Anna Mani
- Mahitha Mohan
- Dileesh Nair
- Narayan
- George Njaralakatt
- Divya Padmini
- Paulaseer
- Neeta Pillai
- Jose Porunnedom
- Pappachen Pradeep
- Sajan Prakash
- Honey Rose
- Letika Saran
- Aswathy Sasikumar
- Abhija Sivakala
- Preeja Sreedharan
- Aswathy Sreekanth
- S. S. Stanley
- Joy Thomas
- P. T. Thomas
- Rajesh Touchriver
- Shiny Wilson
- M. M. Mani
- K. Radhakrishnan (politician)
- S. Rajendran (CPI(M) politician)
- A. Raja (Kerala politician)
- Vazhoor Soman
- C. A. Kurian
- K. K. Jayachandran
- Myna Umaiban
- Binni Krishnakumar
- Sethu Raman IPS
- Aswathy Gigi DCP

== See also ==
- Kottayam district
- Kalvary Mount
- Kattappana
- Administration of Idukki district
- Anamudi
- Civil Station, Idukki
- High Range, Kerala
- Idukki dam
- KDHP Tea Museum
- Kannan Devan Hills
- Kannan Devan Hills Plantations Company
- Kuttampuzha
- Mullaperiyar dam
- Munnar
- Muvattupuzha
- Periyar National Park
- Perumpillichira
- Thekkady
- Thodupuzha
- Vagamon
- Vandiperiyar
