= High Range, Kerala =

Place in India

The High Ranges (aka High Range or High-range) of Kerala is a hilly tract located across the Kerala state of southern India and is treated as a part of the Western Ghats.

This tract includes large and thick tropical forests, mountain peaks such as Anamudi as well as several areas of human settlement and plantations. Major tourist attractions locations along the high ranges include the hill stations Munnar, Vagamon and Thekkady. The major settlements in high range are Kattappana, Adimali, Kumily, Peermade and Mundakayam.

== Geography ==
There is no standard definition for high range and it is generally high altitude areas of Northern Travancore that are 600 metres above mean sea level that are referred to as High Range of Kerala. The origin of this reference is likely to be from the European Planters who initiated large scale Tea, Natural rubber and Cardamom plantations in the region from 19th century.

The areas that are referred to as high range topographically lies between Palakkad Gap and Schencottah Pass. This high lands are not mountain escarpments like Western Ghats that run from Nilgiri Mountains to Konkan and are therefore geologically separate from Western Ghats. The high range of Kerala are lying along Cardamom Hills and Anaimalai Hills and are geologically a discontinuous extension of Javadi Hills and Shevaroy Hills. However, since these hill ranges form part of Drainage divide, cultural divide and climatic divide along with Western Ghats they are geographically treated as southward extension of Western Ghats. This hills have great biodiversity many endangered flora and fauna are present in shola forests of high range.

The high ranges are administratively spread across Idukki districts, Pathanamthitta district and Kottayam district. The major portion of high range lies in Idukki district.

== Economy ==
The major economic activities along high range are Cash crop cultivations such as Tea, Rubber, Cardamom, Cocoa etc., Tourism and Granite Quarrying.

== See also ==
- Munnar
- Mundakayam
