= Alacode =

Alacode or Alakkode may refer to:

- Alacode, Idukki district village in Idukki district
- Alakode, Kannur district village in Kannur district
- Alakkode Road, a suburb of Taliparamba
- Alamkod, Edappal, near Ponnani
- Alamcode, Thiruvananthapuram

== See also ==
- Professor Alan Code, USA
