= Trivandrum Division =

Administrative division of Travancore in British Raj

Southern Division
- Division of Travancore
- 1856–1949
- Location of Travancore
- Capital: Padmanabhapuram
  - Type: Monarchy
- Historical era: British Raj
  - Established: 1856
  - Disestablished: 1949
- Today part of: Kerala and Tamil Nadu, India

Trivandrum Division was an administrative division of the princely state of Travancore, located to the south of Quilon or central Travancore. It was composed of eight taluks — Chirayinkir, Nedumangadu, Neyyattankara, Pattanapuram, Shenkotta, North Trivandrum and South Trivandrum and was administered by a civil servant of rank Diwan Peishkar equivalent to a District Collector in British India. The administrative headquarters were at Trivandrum which was also the seat of the Travancore government and the residence of the Maharajah.

In 1921, the eight taluks of Trivandrum were merged with Southern Division. Since then, the Southern Division was called Trivandrum Division.

Before the formation of the Travancore Kingdom, Southern Travancore, Padmanabhapuram, and the Trivandrum division were part of Venad (kingdom) (previously known as Quilon), with its capital at Quilon. Quilon Kingdom covered present-day four southern Kerala districts and Kanyakumari district of Tamil Nadu. Kollam, Pathanamthitta district, and the northern Trivandrum districts were situated to the north of Quilon. Kanyakumari district and the south-central Trivandrum district were situated to the south of Quilon.

== See also ==
- Northern Division (Travancore)
- Quilon Division
- Southern Division (Travancore)
