= Southern Division (Travancore) =

- Division of Travancore
- 1856–1949
- Location of Travancore
- Capital: Padmanabhapuram
  - Type: Monarchy
- Historical era: British Raj
  - Established: 1856
  - Disestablished: 1949
- Today part of: Kerala and Tamil Nadu, India

The Southern Division, was one of the administrative subdivisions of the princely state of Travancore, encompassing two major regions Trivandrum Division and Padmanabhapuram Division. Southern division located to the South of Quilon and Kottayam Division.

Trivandrum division was composed of eight taluks — Chirayinkir, Nedumangadu, Neyyattankara, Pattanapuram, Shenkotta, North Trivandrum and South Trivandrum. Padmanabhapuram Division covered the five taluks of Agastiswaram, Eraniel, Kalkulam, Thovalay and Vilavancode and was administered by a civil servant of rank Diwan Peishkar equivalent to a District Collector in British India. The Padmanabhapuram division was predominantly Tamil-speaking in contrast to the other three Travancore divisions where Malayalam was spoken. In 1920, the neighbouring Trivandrum was also merged with the Padmanabhapuram Division formed Southern Travancore. In 1949, the princely state of Travancore was dissolved and the Southern Division was included in the Travancore-Cochin state of India.

In 1956, the Tamil-speaking taluks of Southern Division were transferred to the neighbouring Madras State as per the States Reorganisation Act of 1956 and forms the present-day Kanyakumari district of Tamil Nadu. The Malayalam-speaking taluks of the erstwhile Trivandrum division form the Thiruvananthapuram district of Kerala. The headquarters of the Southern Division were at Padmanabhapuram.

Before the formation of the Travancore Kingdom, Southern Travancore, Padmanabhapuram, and the Trivandrum division were part of Venad (kingdom) (previously known as Quilon), with its capital at Quilon. Quilon Kingdom covered present-day four southern Kerala districts and Kanyakumari district of Tamil Nadu. Kollam, Pathanamthitta district, and the northern Trivandrum districts were situated to the north of Quilon. Kanyakumari district and the south-Central region of Trivandrum district were situated to the south of Quilon.

== See also ==
- Northern Division (Travancore)
- Quilon Division
- Trivandrum Division
