= Upputhode =

- village
- Location in Kerala, India Upputhode (India)
- Coordinates: 9°52′0″N 77°0′0″E
- Country: India
- State: Kerala
- District: Idukki
- Taluk: Idukki

Government
  - Type: Panchayati raj (India)

Area
  - Total: 42.41 km^{2} (16.37 sq mi)

Population (2011)
  - Total: 8,775
  - Density: 206.9/km^{2} (535.9/sq mi)

Languages
  - Official: Malayalam, English
- Time zone: UTC+5:30 (IST)

Upputhode is a village in Idukki district in the Indian state of Kerala.

== Demographics ==
As of 2011 Census, Upputhode had a population of 8,755 with 4,375 males and 4,380 females. Upputhode village has an area of 42.41 km^{2} (16.37 sq mi) with 2,087 families residing in it. The average sex ratio was 1001 lower than the state average of 1084. In Upputhode, 10.45% of the population was under 6 years of age. Upputhode had an average literacy of 97% higher than the state average of 94%; male literacy was 97.7% and female literacy was 96.4%.
