= Perumpillichira =

- Grama Panchayat
- Location within Kerala Location within India
- Coordinates: 9.9000°N 76.7170°E
- Country: India
- State: Kerala
- District: Idukki

Government
  - Type: Panchayati Raj
  - Body: Panchayat Samithi
- Elevation: 22 m (72 ft)

Population (2001)
  - Total: 1,500

Languages
  - Official: Malayalam, English, Hindi
- Time zone: UTC+5:30 (IST)
- PIN: 685605
- Telephone code: +914862
- Vehicle registration: KL-38

Perumpillichira is a small village that comes under the Panchayat of Kumaramangalam in Idukki district in the Indian state of Kerala. The name ‘Perumpillichira’ comes from the name of a large water reservoir adjacent to a Hindu temple at the heart of the village. This temple is the center point of the village. Water from Perumpillichira reservoir flows to nearby paddy field throughout the year except in peak summer and it finally reaches the Thodupuzha river. This place is 70 km away from the largest city Cochin in the state of Kerala.

Most of the villagers are involved in agriculture. The main crops are rice, coconut, natural rubber, coco, bananas, tapioca, ginger, and turmeric. Villagers raise cattle, goats, chickens and ducks as well.

== Educational Institutions ==
- Al Azhar Public School
- Al Azhar Arts and Science College
- Al Azhar B-Ed College
- Al Azhar T T C
- Al Azhar Poly Technic College
- Al-Azhar College of Engineering & Technology
- Al Azhar Law College
- Al Azhar Paramedical Institution
- Al Azhar Dental College
- St. Joseph's Upper Primary School
- Sandeepani Lower Primary School
- Akshaya e Centre

== Places of Worship ==
- Puthanpally Juma Masjid
- Perumpillichira Hindu Temple
- Perumpillichira Muhyideen Juma Masjid
- St Joseph's Church

== Nature ==
On a walk along the water stream from Perumpillichira reservoir down towards Thodupuzha river, one will encounter numerous birds like white-breasted waterhen (kula kozhi), indian cormorant (kakkattaravu), Indian pond heron (kula kokku), little egret (chinnamunti), eastern grey heron (charamunti), night heron (pathira kokku), and Travancore pied kingfisher (pulli ponman).

The paddy field is home to a vast variety of fish species such as walking catfish (muzhi), banded snakehead fish (varaal), stinging catfish (kaari), yellow catfish (manjakoori), wallago attu (valah), giant danio (paral), peninsular olive barb or systomus sarana (kuruva), tank goby (poolon), tire track eel (mananju), and fresh water lobster (konju).

In addition to birds and fish, asian palm civet (marapatty), also called toddy cat, wild rabbit (kattu muyal), fresh water tortoise (aama) and mongoose (keeri) also find a home here.
