= Central Division (Travancore) =

Quilon
- Division of Travancore
- 1856–1949
- Location of Central Travancore
- Capital: Quilon
  - Type: Monarchy
- Historical era: Travancore
  - Established: 1856
  - Disestablished: 1949
- Today part of: Kerala, India

Central Division or Central Travancore, also known as Kollam District or Quilon Division was one of three (or four) administrative subdivisions of the princely state of Travancore in what is now Kerala. It was administered by a civil servant of rank Diwan Peishkar equivalent to a District Collector in British India and consisted of 8 taluks — Karthikapally, Thiruvalla, Pathanamthitta, Ambalappuzha, Chengannur, Kunnathur, Karunagappalli, Adoor, Mavelikkara, Quilon and Kottarakara. The headquarters was the town of Kollam. The Edava Varkala Lake forms the southern border of Central Travancore, while Changanassery in southern Kottayam marks the northern border of Kollam district. North Travancore (present-day Kottayam, south and central Ernakulam and Idukki districts) and South Travancore (present-day Thiruvananthapuram and Kanyakumari districts) are other two major districts of Travancore, which located to the north and south of Quilon, respectively.

== See also ==
- Northern Division (Travancore)
- Southern Division (Travancore)
- Trivandrum Division
