= Udumbannoor =

Gram Panchayat in Idukki district of Kerala, India

Udumbannoor is a panchayth in Idukki district and Thodupuzha taluk. It is situated in the western side of Idukki district. Udumbannoor is known as the 'honey hotspot' of Kerala and is largest producer of honey in the region. It is the first bio-village of Kerala.. It lies 16 km from Thodupuzha, and several tourist attractions including cherumarikuttu, vellore kooppu, vellore temple, and ela forest are situated in this panchayath.

== Administration ==
Udumbannoor is a village in Elamdesham block panchayath in Thodupuzha taluk of Idukki district in Kerala state.

== Location ==
Udumbannoor is surrounded by Idukki Taluk towards the east, Thodupuzha Taluk towards the west, Erattupetta Taluk towards the south and Kothamangalam taluk to the north
