= Chathurangapara =

- village
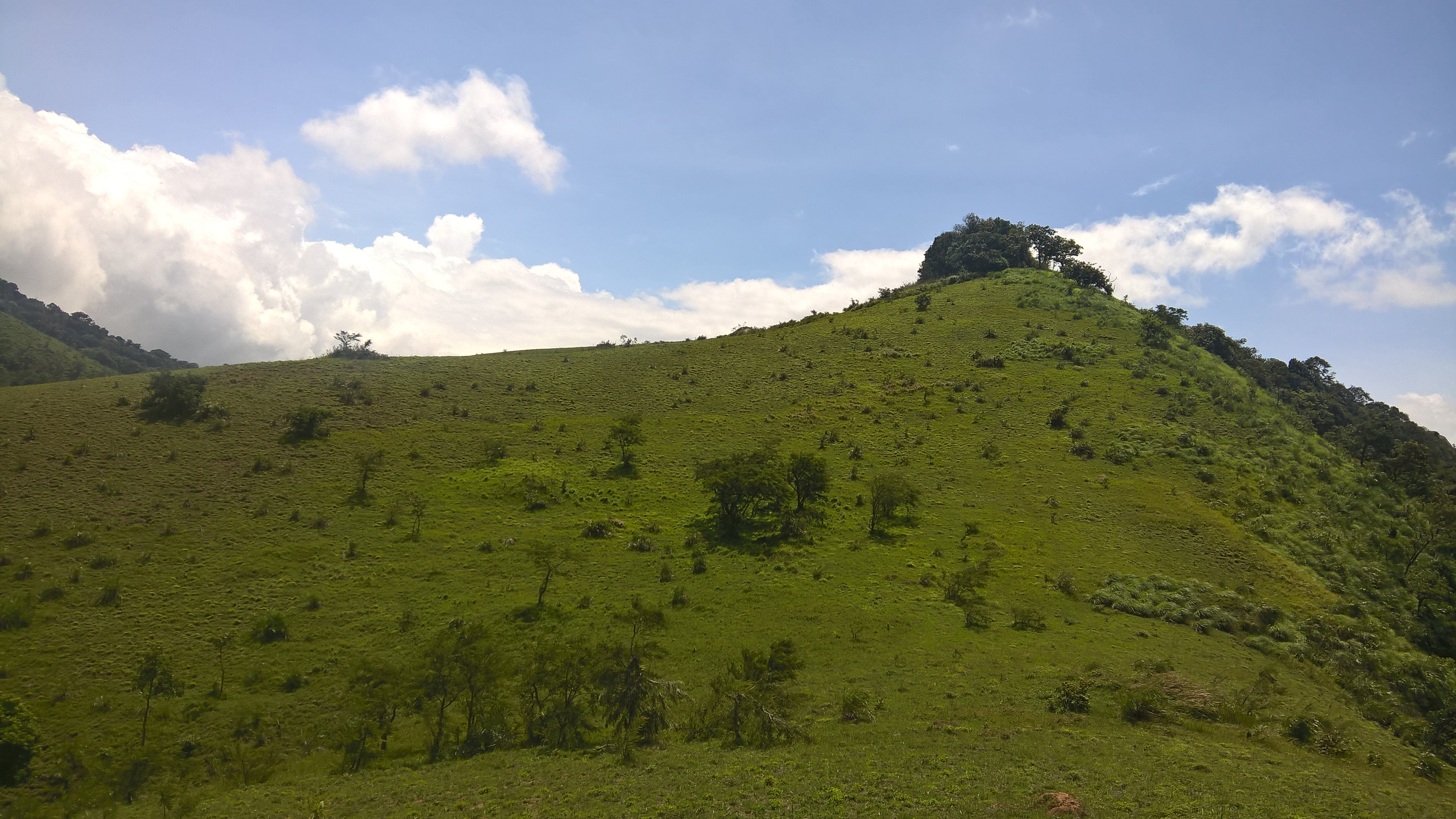

- Location in Kerala, India Chathurangapara (India)
- Coordinates: 9.8872000°N 77.198150°E
- Country: India
- State: Kerala
- District: Idukki

Government
  - Body: Udumbanchola panchayat & Senapathy panchayat

Area
  - Total: 29.92 km^{2} (11.55 sq mi)

Population (2011)
  - Total: 4,177
  - Density: 139.6/km^{2} (361.6/sq mi)

Languages
  - Official: Malayalam, English
- Time zone: UTC+5:30 (IST)

Chathurangapara is a village in Idukki district in the Indian state of Kerala. The village is part of Udumbanchola (ward nos 4,7,11) and Senapathy Panchayats (ward 6,7).

== Demographics ==
As of 2011 Census, Chathurangapara had a total population of 4,177 which constitutes 2,124 males and 2,053 females. The total geographical area of village is 29.92 km^{2} (11.55 sq mi) with 1,306 families residing in it. The average sex ratio was 967 lower than the state average of 1084.

In Chathurangapara, 7.5% of the population was under 6 years of age. Chathurangapara had an average literacy of 81.5% lower than the state average of 94%; male literacy was 86.6% and female literacy was 76.3%.

== Image Gallery ==
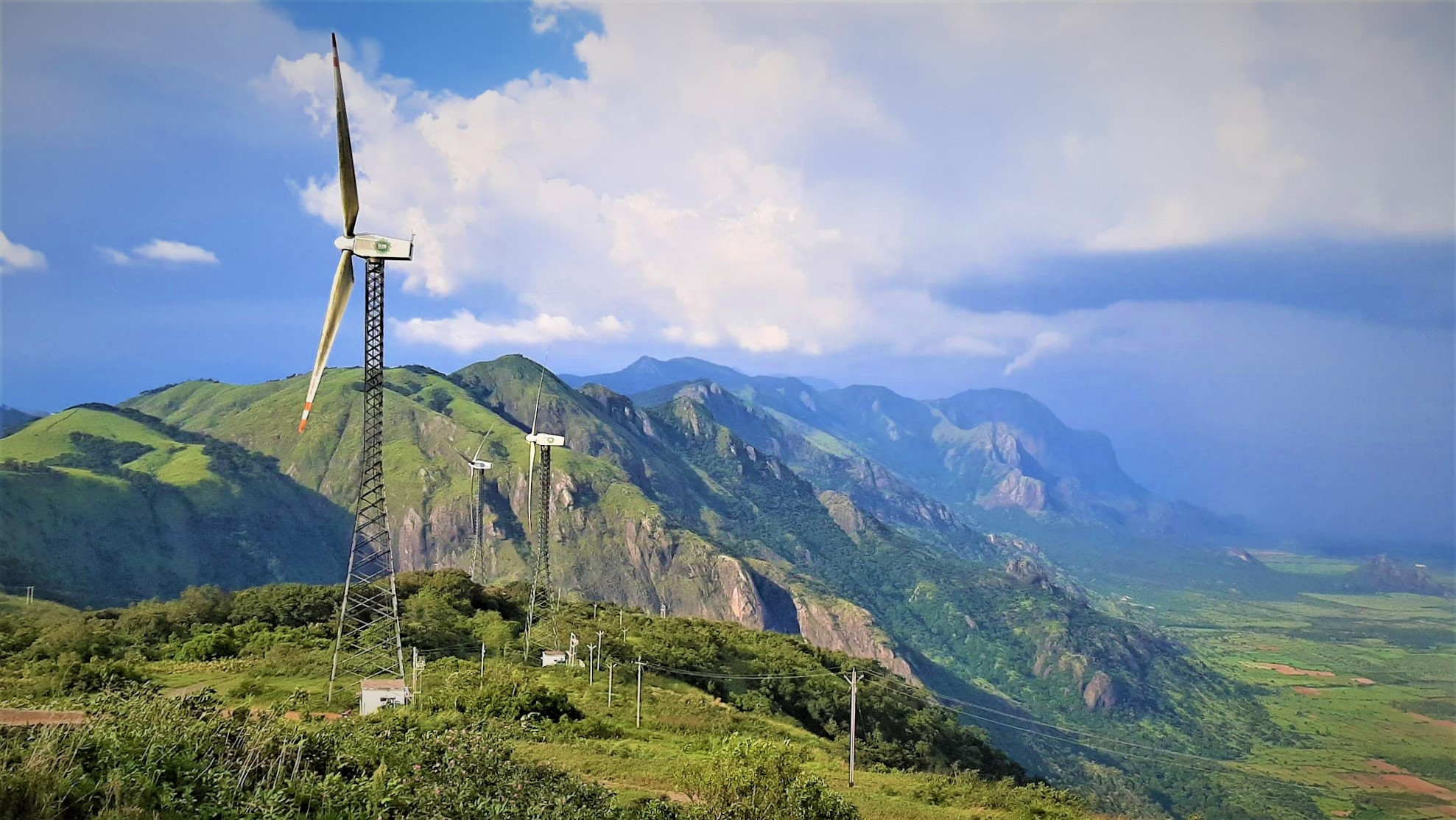

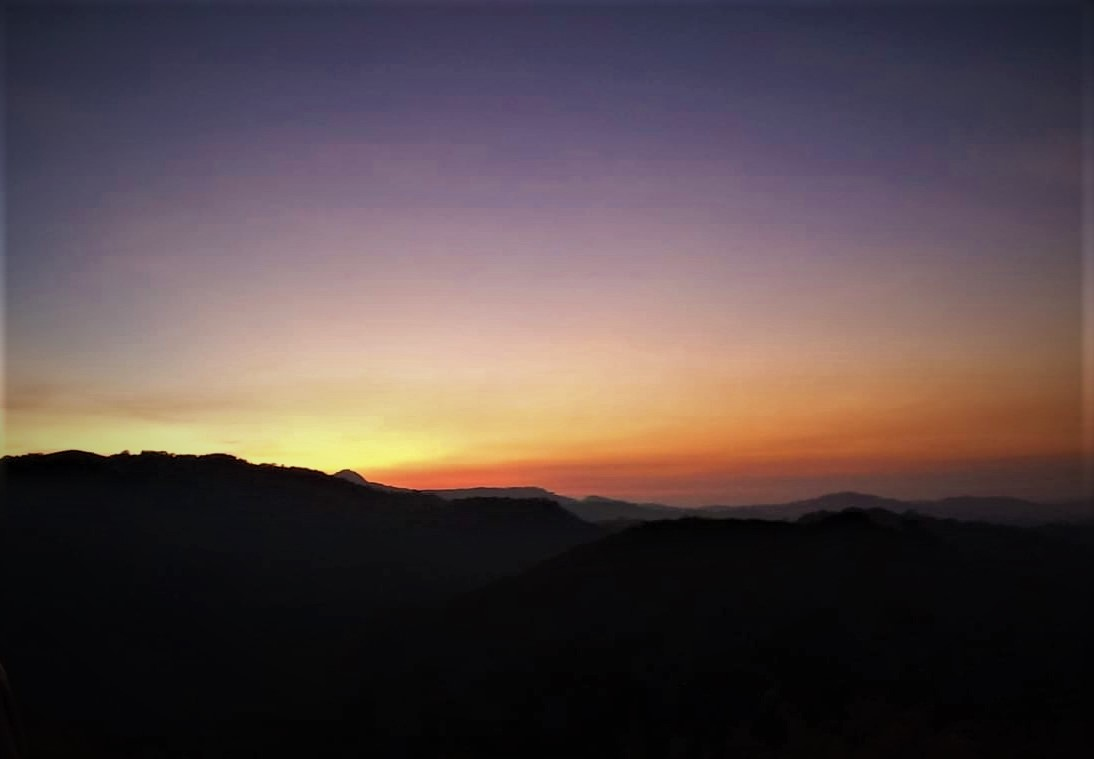

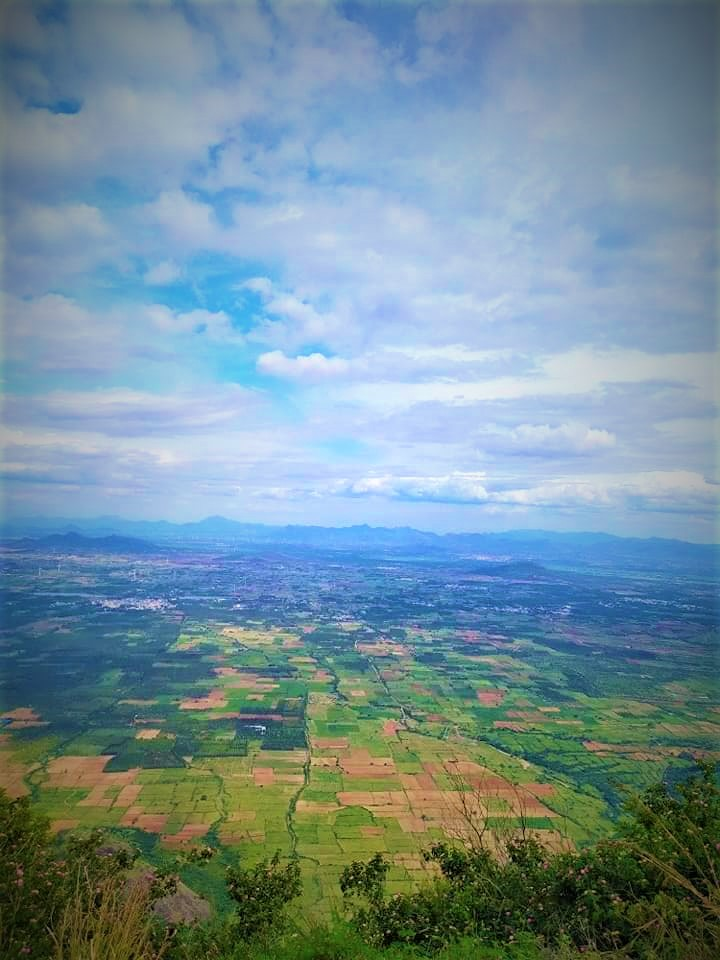
