= Velliyamattom =

- village
- Location in Kerala, India Velliyamattom (India)
- Coordinates: 9°50′0″N 76°47′0″E
- Country: India
- State: Kerala
- District: Idukki

Government
  - Body: Panchayath

Population (2011)
  - Total: 19,366

Languages
  - Official: Malayalam, English
- Time zone: UTC+5:30 (IST)

Velliyamattom is a village in Idukki district in the Indian state of Kerala.

== Demographics ==
As of 2011 India census, Velliyamattom had a population of 19,366 with 9,695 males and 9,671 females.
