= Kanthippara =

- Village
- Location in Kerala, India Kanthippara (India)
- Coordinates: 9°56′0″N 77°8′0″E
- Country: India
- State: Kerala
- District: Idukki

Area
  - Total: 30.24 km^{2} (11.68 sq mi)

Population (2011)
  - Total: 10,901
  - Density: 360.5/km^{2} (933.6/sq mi)

Languages
  - Official: Malayalam, English
- Time zone: UTC+5:30 (IST)

Kanthippara is a village in Idukki district in the Indian state of Kerala.

== Demographics ==
As of 2011 India census, Kanthippara had a population of 10901 with 5389 males and 5512 females.
