= Manjumala =

- village
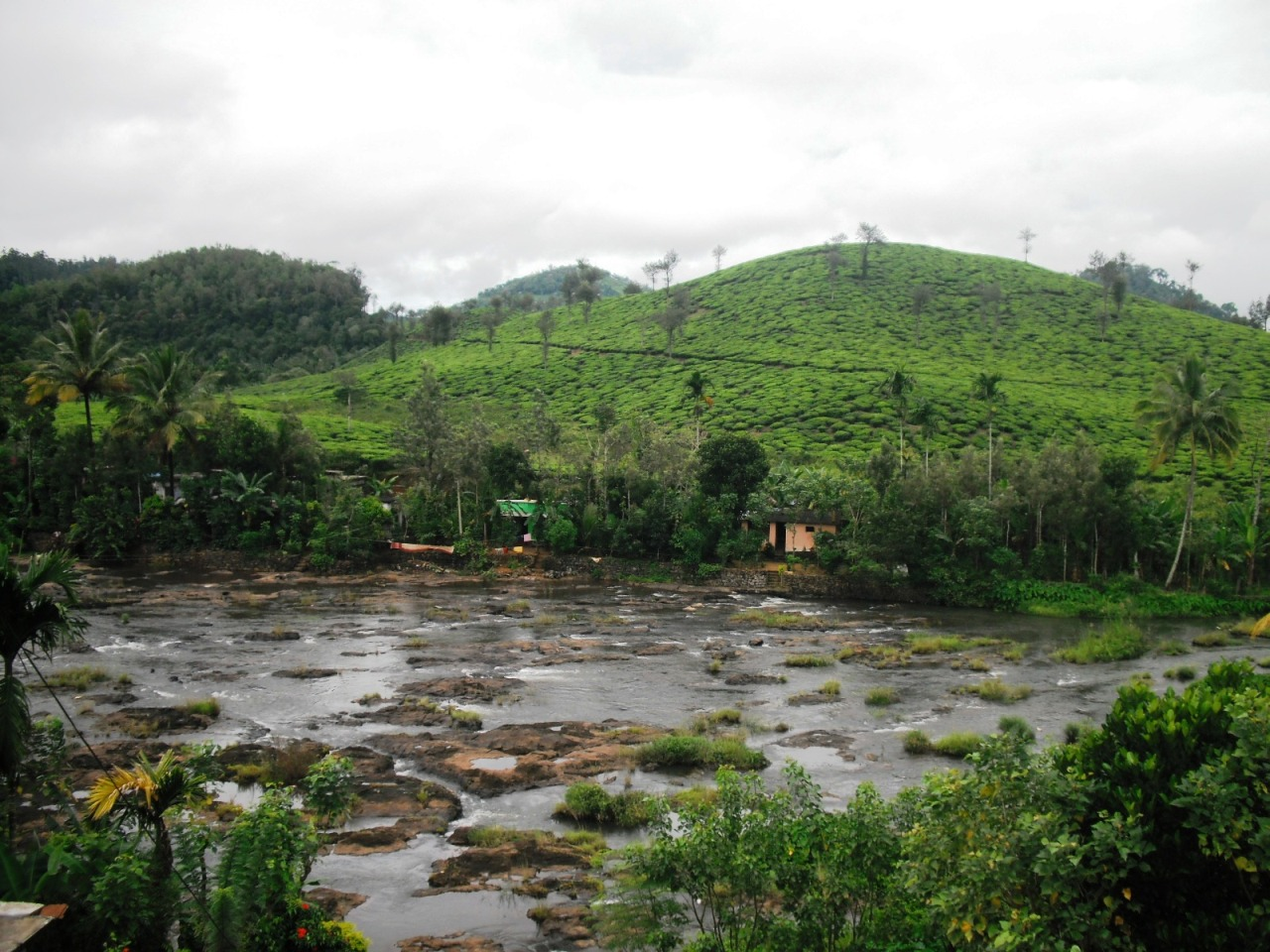
- Manjumala limits and Periyar River

- Location in Kerala, India Manjumala (India)
- Coordinates: 9°34′25″N 77°4′55″E
- Country: India
- State: Kerala
- District: Idukki

Population (2011)
  - Total: 20,503

Languages
  - Official: Malayalam, English
- Time zone: UTC+5:30 (IST)

Manjumala is a village in Idukki district in India's southwestern state of Kerala.

== Demographics ==
As of 2011 India census, Manjumala had a population of 20503 with 10200 males and 10303 females.
