= Alacode, Idukki district =

Alacode
- village
- Location in Kerala, India Alacode (India)
- Coordinates: 9.8589800°N 76.8111900°E
- Country: India
- State: Kerala
- District: Idukki

Population (2011)
  - Total: 11,182

Languages
  - Official: Malayalam, English
- Time zone: UTC+5:30 (IST)

Alacode is a village in Idukki district in the Indian state of Kerala.

== Demographics ==
As of 2011 India census, Alacode had a population of 11182 with 5516 males and 5666 females.
