= Administration of Idukki district =

Idukki District has four types of administrative hierarchies:

- Taluk and Village administration managed by the provincial government of Kerala
- Panchayath Administration managed by the local bodies
- Parliament Constituencies for the federal government of India
- Assembly Constituencies for the provincial government of Kerala

== Community Development Blocks ==
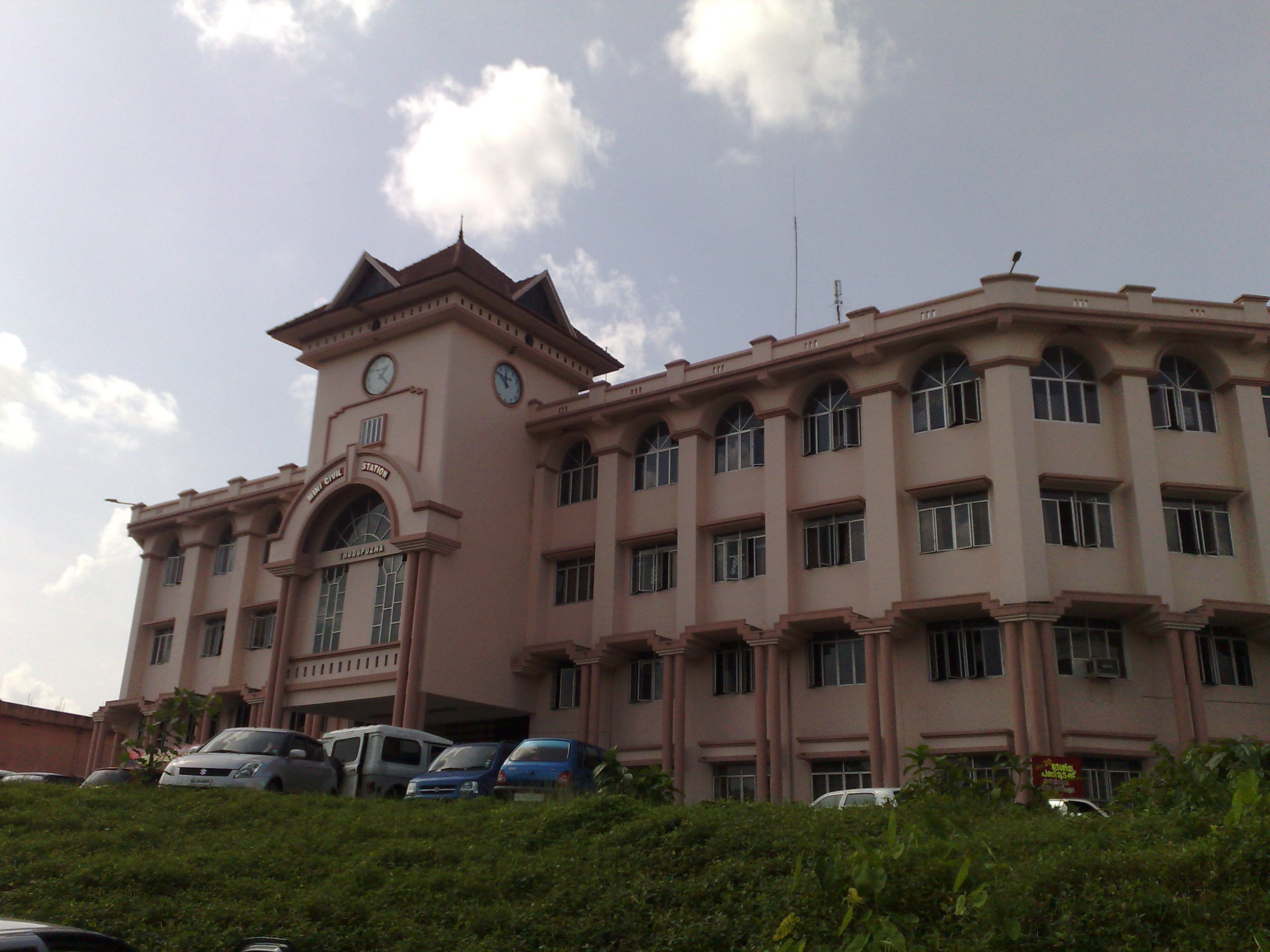
Thodupuzha Civil Station

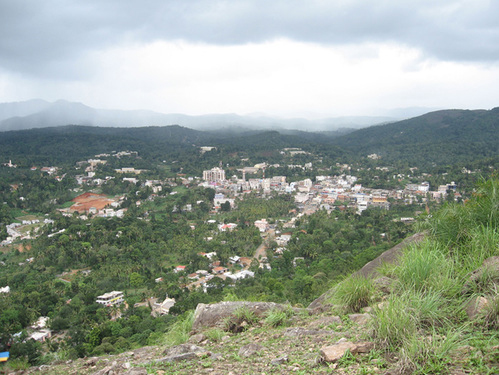
Kattappana

Idukki District is divided into eight community development blocks (block panchayats). The community development blocks are further divided into talukas. The blocks are:

- Adimaly Block with
  - Pallivasal grama panchayat
  - Adimaly grama panchayat (Mannamkandam)
  - Vellathooval grama panchayat
  - Bysonvalley grama panchayat
  - Konnathady grama panchayat
- Azhutha Block with
  - Elappara grama panchayat
  - Kokkayar grama panchayat
  - Kumily grama panchayat
  - Peerumedu grama panchayat
  - Peruvanthanam grama panchayat
  - Vandiperiyar grama panchayat
- Devikulam Block with
  - Chinnakkanal grama panchayat
  - Edamalakudy grama panchayat
  - Kanthalloor grama panchayat
  - Mankulam grama panchayat
  - Marayoor grama panchayat
  - Munnar grama panchayat
  - Santhanpara grama panchayat
  - Vattavada grama panchayat
- Elamdesom Block with
  - Alakode grama panchayat
  - Karimannoor grama panchayat
  - Kodikulam grama panchayat
  - Kudayathoor grama panchayat
  - Udumbannoorgrama panchayat
  - Vannappuramgrama panchayat
  - Velliamattomgrama panchayat
- Idukki Block with
  - Arakkulam grama panchayat
  - Kamakshy grama panchayat
  - Kanjikuzhy grama panchayat
  - Mariapuram grama panchayat
  - Vathykudy grama panchayat
  - Vazhathoppu grama panchayat
- Kattappana Block with
  - Kattappana Municipality
  - Ayyappankoil grama panchayat
  - Chakkupallam grama panchayat
  - Erattayar grama panchayat
  - Kanchiyar grama panchayat
  - Upputhara grama panchayat
  - Vandanmedu grama panchayat
- Nedumkandam Block with
  - Karunapuram grama panchayat
  - Nedumkandam grama panchayat
  - Pampadumpara grama panchayat
  - Rajakkad grama panchayat
  - Rajakumary grama panchayat
  - Senapathy grama panchayat
  - Udumbanchola grama panchayat
- Thodupuzha Block with
  - Thodupuzha Municipality
