= Ulladan =

Indigenous scheduled tribe group found in Kerala, South India

The Ulladan, also known as Nayadi or Nadi, are an indigenous Scheduled Tribe group found in Kerala, south India. In the 2011 census their population was estimated to be around 16,230. They are primarily located in the Kasaragod District of Kerala.

The Ulladan have mostly converted to Hinduism. Sastha, Siva and Bhadrakali are especially worshipped. A pilgrimage centre to them is Sabarimala Sastha temple.
