= Northern Division (Travancore) =

- Division of Travancore
- 1856–1949
- Location of Travancore
- Capital: Kottayam
  - Type: Monarchy
- Historical era: British Raj
  - Established: 1856
  - Disestablished: 1949
- Today part of: Kerala, India

The Northern Division or Northern Travancore or Kottayam Division was one of the three (or four) administrative subdivisions of the princely state of Travancore in British India. It was established in 1856 and covered north and central parts Kottayam, southern central parts of Ernakulam and Idukki districts in the present-day Kerala. The division was administered by a Diwan Peishkar, a civil servant of rank equivalent to a District Collector. The division was sub-divided into the taluks of Alangadu, Kunnatunadu, Meenachil, Muvattupuzha, Paravur, Thodupuzha and Vaikom. The headquarters of the division was first located at Cherthala, and later got shifted to Kottayam.

Before the formation of the Travancore Kingdom, Northern Travancore were part of Thekkumkur and Vadakkumkur Kingdoms. Thekkumkur was an independent kingdom, while Vadakkumkur was a vassal to the Kingdom of Cochin.

== See also ==
- Quilon Division
- Southern Division (Travancore)
- Trivandrum Division
