= Padmanabhapuram division =

Padmanabhapuram division is a revenue division in the Kanyakumari district of Tamil Nadu, India. Thiru. Vinay Kumar Meena is the current Sub Collector Serving here.
