= Kovilur =

Kovilur, Koviloor or Kovilore may refer to the following places in India:

== Kerala ==
- Koviloor, Kerala, a village in Idukki district

== Tamil Nadu ==
- Kovilur, Ariyalur
- Kovilur, Dharmapuri
- Koviloor, Karaikudi
- Kovilur, Thanjavur
- Kovilur, Tiruvannamalai
- Tirukoilur
