= Chinnakannan Sivasankaran =

Tamil ( Mudaliar) Indian-born businessman (born 1956)

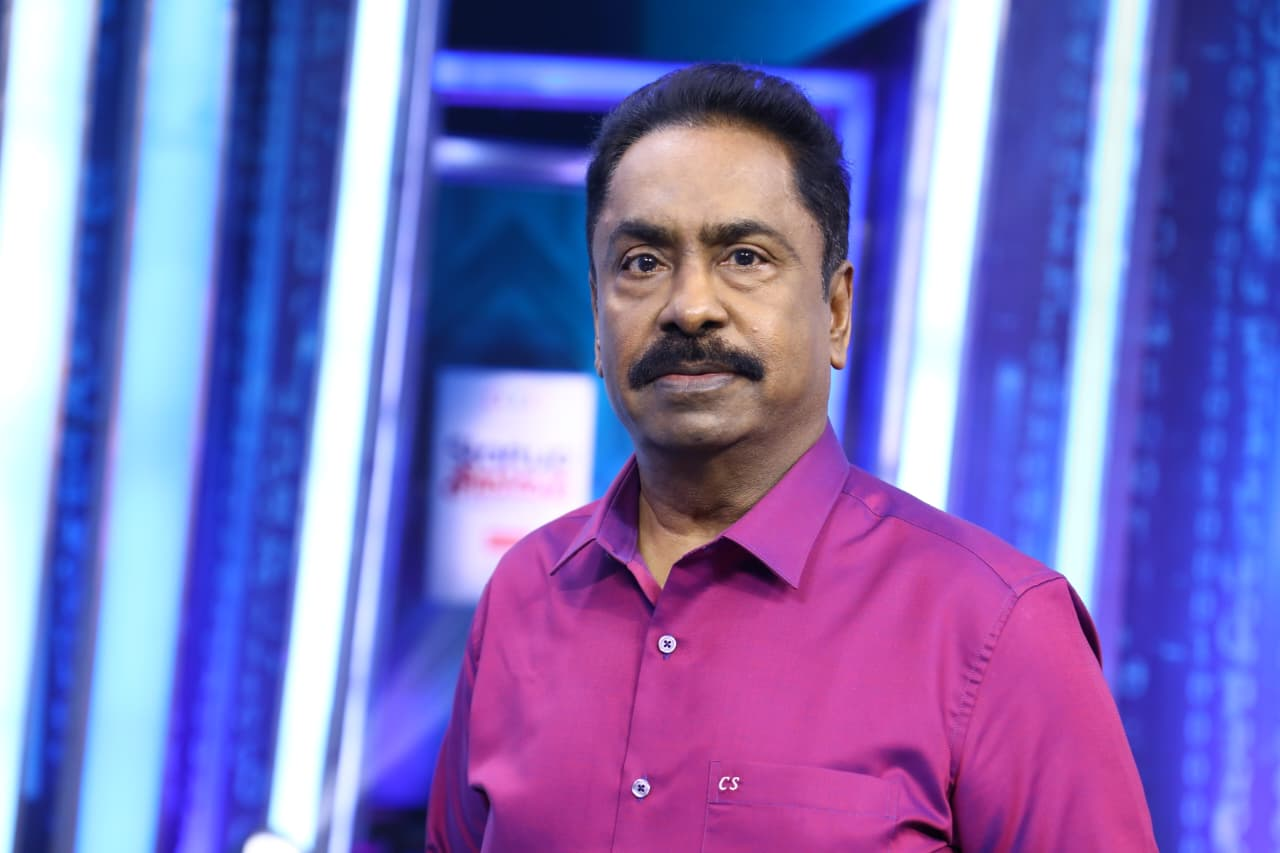
- Born: July 29, 1956 (age 70); Chennai, Tamil Nadu
- Occupations: businessman, entrepreneur
- Known for: Aircel, DishnetDSL, Sterling Group

Chinnakannan Sivasankaran (born 29 July 1956) is an Indian-born businessman and serial entrepreneur who is a citizen of Seychelles. He is the founder of Indian mobile network operator Aircel, Siva Computers, and Dishnet.

== Career ==
Sivasankaran started his business career in 1985 when he purchased Sterling Computers from Robert Amritraj. Sterling became one of India's top three computer companies.

In 1992, Sivasankaran won a five-year contract from state-owned MTNL, which ran telecom services in Mumbai and Delhi. He shifted base from Chennai to New Delhi. In 2004, Siva managed to get cellular telephony licences for Delhi and three other telecom circles. He sold these licences to his old acquaintance from Chennai, Shashi Ruia of Essar, for $105 million.

In 2004, Chinnakannan Sivasankaran bought 65% stake in Barista under his company Fresh & Honest (A Sterling Group subsidiary). And his Sterling Group also bought out Tata Coffee's stake later.

=== Founding of Aircel ===
Chinnakannan Sivasankaran founded Aircel from Kovilur village, Cheyyar taluk, Tiruvannamalai district and started its operations in Tamil Nadu in 1999.

It had a significant presence in Odisha, Assam, and North-East telecom circles, and it was formerly the market leader in Tamil Nadu. Voice and other 2G and 3G services were shut off everywhere after merger negotiations with Reliance Communications failed.

Malaysian telecom company Maxis Communications bought a 74% stock in 2005. The remaining 26% stock is held by Sindya Securities and Investments promoted by Suneeta Reddy.

=== Bankruptcy ===
In 2018, Aircel faced financial difficulties and eventually filed for bankruptcy.

In January 2018, Aircel shut down its operations in unprofitable circles including, Gujarat, Maharashtra, Haryana, Himachal Pradesh, Madhya Pradesh and Uttar Pradesh (West).

=== Dishnet ===
In 1998, Sivasankaran started DishnetDSL, the country's first DSL Internet Service Provider. In 2004 it was sold to VSNL which was acquired by Tata Group in 2008.
