= Kallarkutty Dam =

Dam in Kerala, India

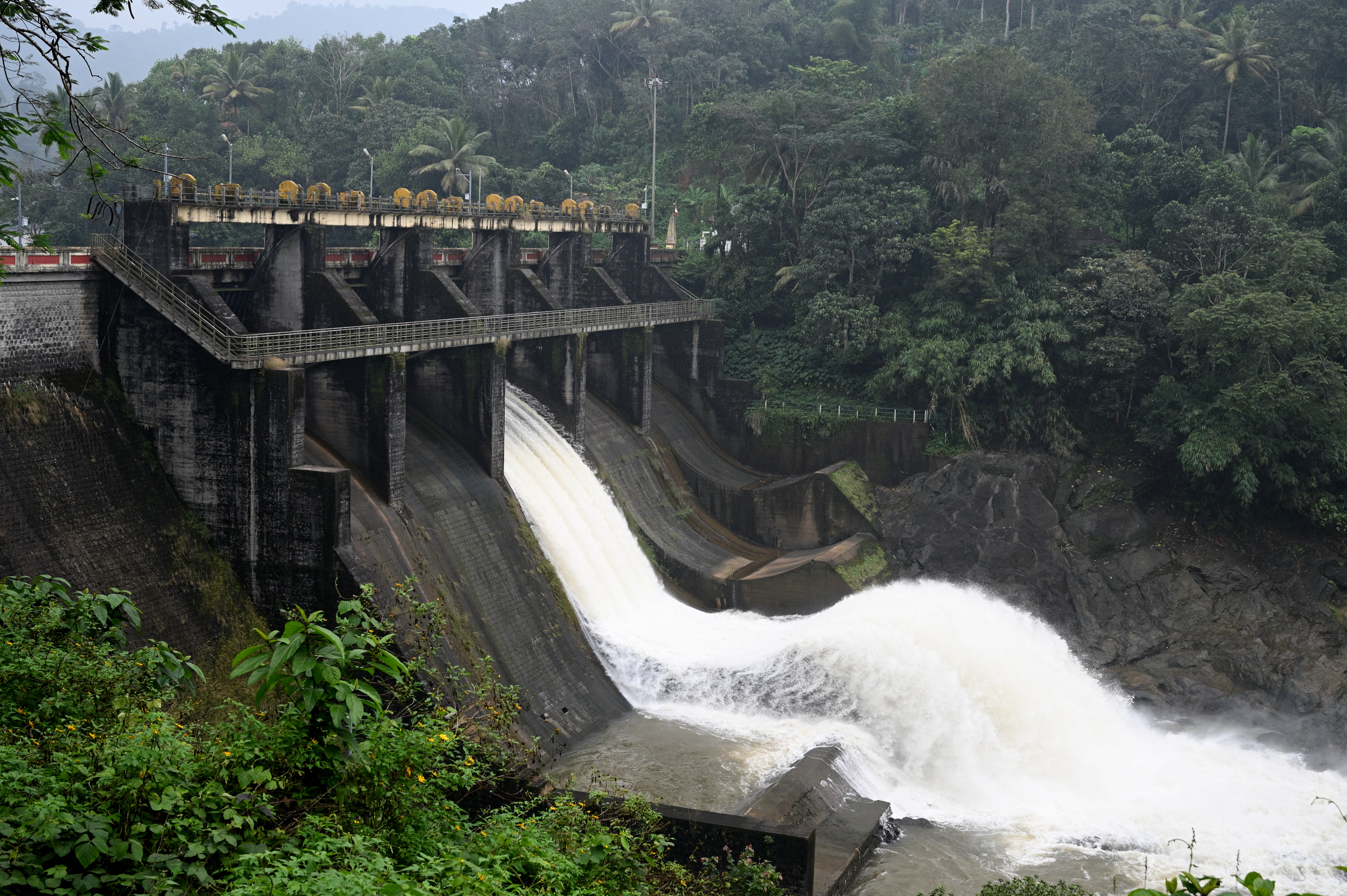
- Kallarkutty dam in 2021

- Location within Kerala Location within India
- Interactive map of Kallarkutty Dam
- Country: India
- Location: Idukki, Kerala
- Coordinates: 9°58′48″N 77°00′05″E
- Purpose: Power
- Status: Operational
- Opening date: 1961
- Owner: Kerala State Electricity Board

Dam and spillways
- Type of dam: Gravity dam
- Impounds: Muthirapuzha river
- Height (foundation): 43 m (141 ft)
- Length: 182.88 m (600.0 ft)
- Spillways: 5
- Spillway type: Ogee type, radial gates, each of size 10.97 x 6.4 m

Reservoir
- Normal elevation: 456.90 m (1,499.0 ft)
- Website; KSEB - Official website

Kallarkutty Dam is a gravity dam built on the Muthirapuzha river, a tributary of the Periyar river, as part of the Neriamangalam Hydroelectric Project at Kallarkutty in Vellathooval panchayat of Idukki district in Kerala, India. The water discharged from the Chenkulam dam's powerhouse and the Muthirapuzha river is diverted to the Neriamangalam powerhouse near Panamkutty above the Pambla dam. The Hydroelectric Project was commissioned on 27 January 1961 to generate 45 MW of power using 3 turbines with a capacity of 15 MW. In 2006, the project was upgraded from 45 MW to 52.65 MW. Taluks through which release flow are Udumbanchola, Devikulam, Idukki, Kothamangalam, Muvattupuzha, Kunnathunadu, Aluva, Kodungalloor and Paravur. The Project was led by Kerala State Electricity Board Engineer E.U. Philipose

== Specifications ==
- Latitude : 9⁰ 58′ 48" N
- Longitude: 77⁰ 00′ 05" E
- Panchayath : Vellathooval
- Village : Vellathooval
- District : Idukki
- River Basin : Mudirapuzha
- River : Mudirapuzha
- Release from Dam to river : Mudirapuzha
- Year of completion : 1961
- Type of Dam : Masonry- gravity
- Classification : HH (High Height)
- Maximum Water Level (MWL) : EL 456.90 m
- Full Reservoir Level (FRL) : EL 456.90 m
- Storage at FRL : 6.8 Mm3
- Height from deepest foundation : 43.00 m
- Length : 182.88 m
- Spillway : Ogee type- 5 Nos. radial gates, each of size 10.97 x 6.4 m

== Reservoir ==
The Kallarkutty dam is the recipient of flows from both arms of the Muthirapuzha sub-basin. The reservoir thus formed is spread about 0.648 sqkm and has 6.88 million cubic meter capacity. Kallarkutty reservoir hosts Boating and other hydel tourism activities.

Reservoir side

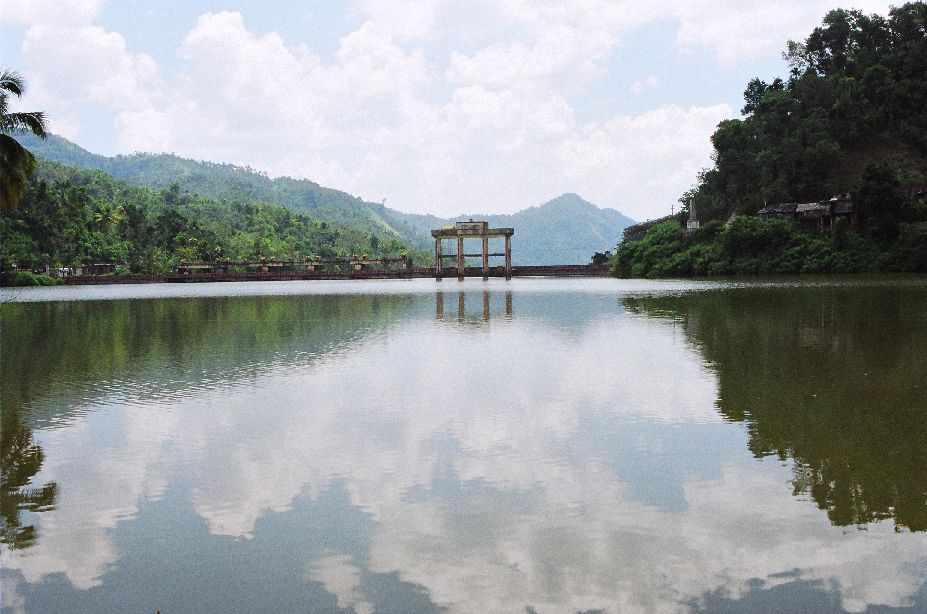
Reservoir
