= Ashwath =

Ashwath may refer to any of the following:

- Ashvattha, Sanskrit term for the tree Ficus religiosa
- Ashwath Aiyappa, an Indian cricketer
- Aswath Damodaran, an Indian academic
- C. Ashwath, an Indian playback singer
- K. S. Ashwath, an Indian actor in Kannada cinema
- Ashwath Bhatt, an Indian actor

== See also ==
- Aswathy, 1974 Indian film directed by Jeassy
- Ashwathy Kurup or Parvathy Jayaram, an Indian actress and dancer
- Aswathi Menon, an Indian actress
- Ashwathi Pillai, an Indian-Swedish badminton player
- Aswathy Sasikumar, an Indian writer in Malayalam
- Aswathy Sreekanth, an Indian actress
- Aswathi Thirunal Gowri Lakshmi Bayi, an Indian writer
- Aswathi Thirunal Rama Varma, an Indian musician
- Ashwatthama, a character in the ancient Indian epic Mahabharata
- Aswathama (film), 2020 Indian Telugu-language action thriller film
- Aswaddhama, 1988 Indian Telugu-language action film by B. Gopal
- Kalki 2898 AD, working title Ashwatthama, a 2024 Indian sci-fi film by Nag Ashwin
- "Ashwathama", an episode of the Indian TV series Sacred Games
