= Syngal =

Syngal is a surname. Notable people with the surname include:

- B. K. Syngal (1940–2022), Indian telecommunications executive
- Sonia Syngal (fl. from 1993), American businesswoman
