= Viripara Weir =

Diversion dam in Kerala, India

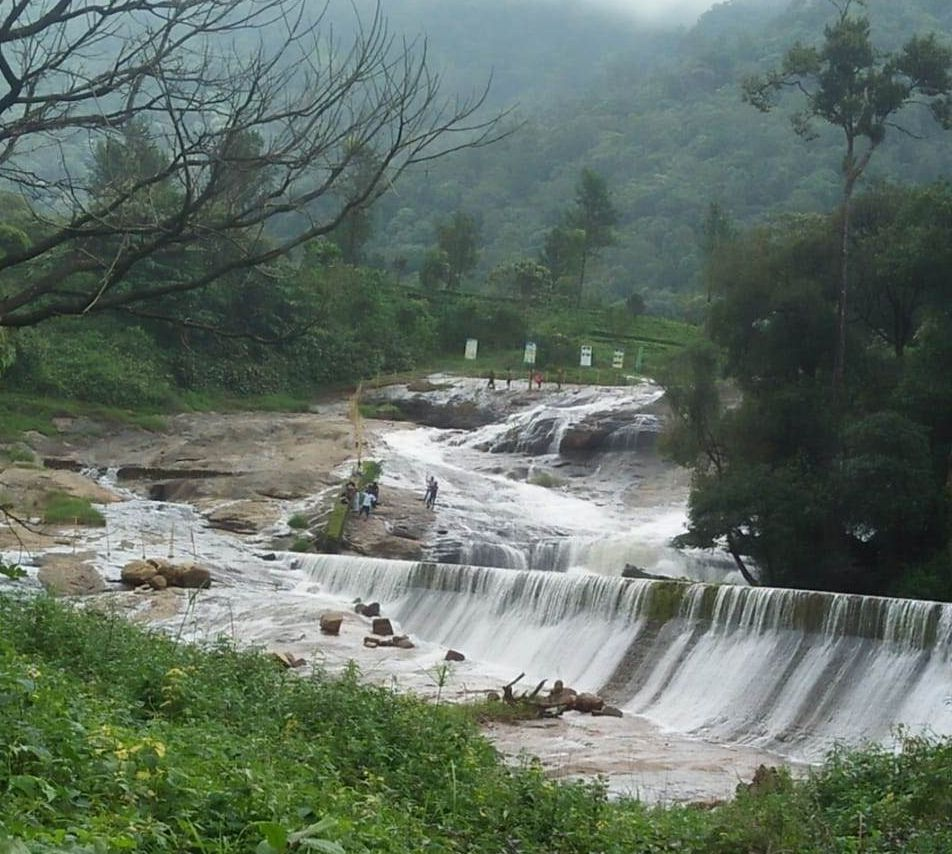
- Interactive map of Viripara Weir
- Country: India
- Location: Mankulam, Idukki district, Kerala
- Coordinates: 10°4′39.6″N 76°57′41.5″E
- Purpose: Power
- Status: Operational
- Opening date: 1961

Viripara Weir is a Diversion weir constructed across Upper Kallar river which is a tributary of Pooyankutty river in Mankulam village of Idukki district in Kerala, India. The water flows from the dam to Menachery river and flows through the taluk of Devikulam. The Viripara weir is constructed as an augmentation scheme to Neriamangalam Hydro Electric Project. Upper Kallar, a tributary of Pooyankutty river is diverted in to Kallarkutty reservoir by a low diversion weir at Viripara along with a short diversion tunnel.

== Specifications ==
- Latitude : N
- Longitude: E
- Panchayath : Mankulam
- Village : Mankulam
- District : Idukki
- River Basin : Periyar
- River : Upper Kallar
- Release from Dam to river : Menachery ar
- Type of Dam : Masonry
- Classification : Weir
- Full Reservoir Level ( FRL) : EL 1141.59 m
- Maximum Water Level (MWL)
- Storage at FRL : Diversion only
- Height from deepest foundation :4.57m
- Length
- Taluk through which release flows : Devikulam
- Spillway : Overflow weir
- Year of completion :1961
- Crest Level : EL 1141.59 m
- Name of Project : Neriamangalam HEP
- River Outlet : Nil
- Purpose of Project : Hydro Power

== Tourism ==
The Dam site is a favourite picnic spot and there are two waterfalls called Viripara Falls and Nakshathrakuthu Falls.
