= Sengulam Dam =

Dam in Kerala, India

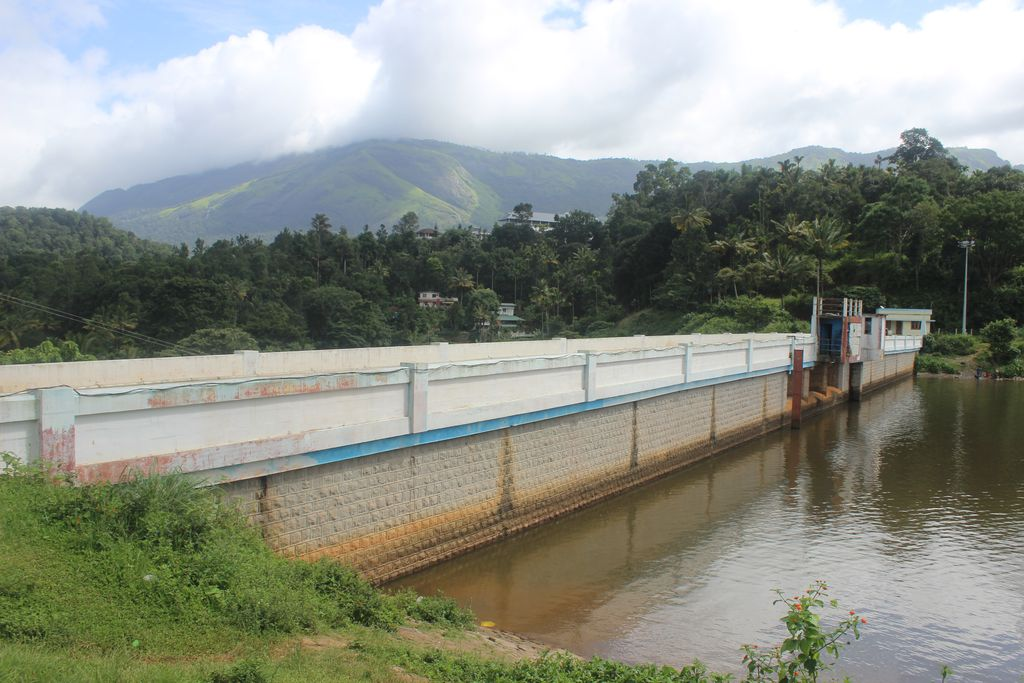

- Location within Kerala Location within India
- Official name: Sengulam Dam
- Country: India
- Location: Kunchithanny, Idukki, Kerala
- Coordinates: 10°00′39″N 77°01′57″E
- Purpose: Power
- Status: Operational
- Opening date: 1957 (69 years ago)
- Owner: Kerala State Electricity Board

Dam and spillways
- Type of dam: Gravity dam
- Impounds: Muthirapuzha river
- Height (foundation): 26.82 m (88.0 ft)
- Length: 143.26 m (470.0 ft)
- Elevation at crest: 847.65 m (2,781.0 ft)
- Width (crest): 4.88 m (16.0 ft)
- Dam volume: 18.4 TCM
- Spillways: 3
- Spillway type: Ogee, ungated – overflow section 4.8 × 1.8 m
- Spillway capacity: 70.8 m^{3}/sec

Reservoir
- Creates: Sengulam Reservoir
- Active capacity: 0.3903 MCM
- Inactive capacity: 846 m (2,776 ft)
- Catchment area: 5.18 km^{2} (2.00 sq mi)
- Surface area: 0.29 km^{2} (0.11 sq mi)
- Maximum water depth: 849.49 m (2,787.0 ft)
- Normal elevation: 847.65 m (2,781.0 ft)

Sengulam Power Station
- Coordinates: 9°58′33″N 77°01′50″E
- Operator: Kerala State Electricity Board
- Commission date: 1954 (72 years ago)
- Turbines: 4 × 12.8 MW, Pelton-type
- Installed capacity: 51.25 MW
- Annual generation: 182 MU
- Website; Official website

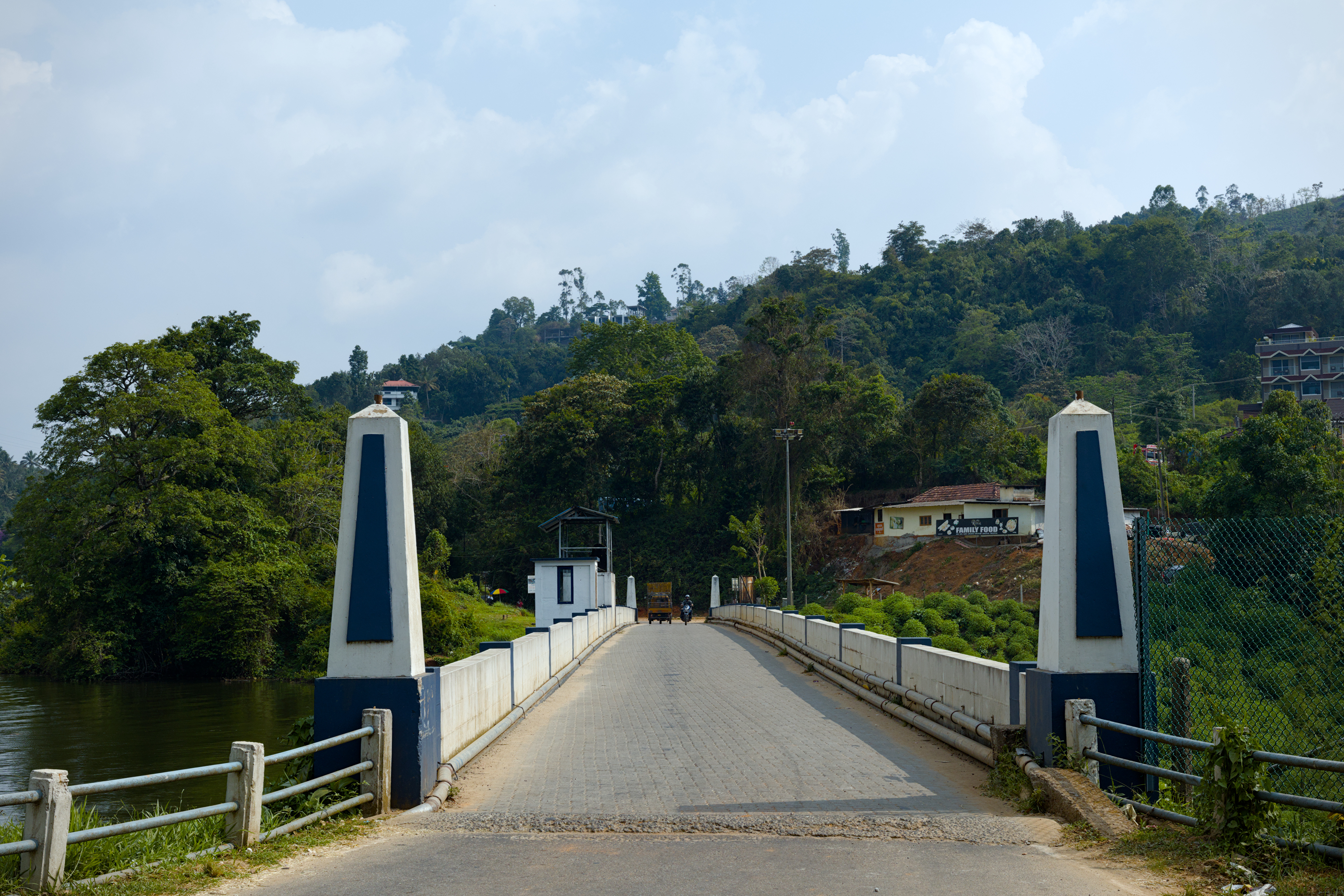

Sengulam Dam is a gravity dam located on the Muthirapuzha river in Vellathooval panchayat of Idukki district in the Indian state of Kerala. It spans 144.50 metres (474.1 ft) long and stands 26.82 metres (88.0 ft). It hosts a 48 MW power plant.

== History ==
The project was commissioned in 1954 with a capacity of 48 MW (4 x 12 MW). The dam was constructed in 1957 as part of the Sengulam Hydroelectric Project. In 2002, the project was upgraded from 48 MW to 51.2 MW.

== Project ==
The Sengulam Project was intended to use the tailrace water of the Pallivasal project. The dam is constructed of masonry. The power house is situated at Vellathooval in Devikulam taluk. The water collected is conveyed through a penstock pipe to the Sengulam powerhouse in Vellathooval, which generates 51.2 MW of electricity using four 12.8 MW turbines. Annual production is 182 MU. Taluks receiving release flow are Udumbanchola, Devikulam, Idukki, Kothamangalam, Muvattupuzha, Kunnathunadu, Aluva, Kodungalloor and Paravur.

== Reservoirs ==
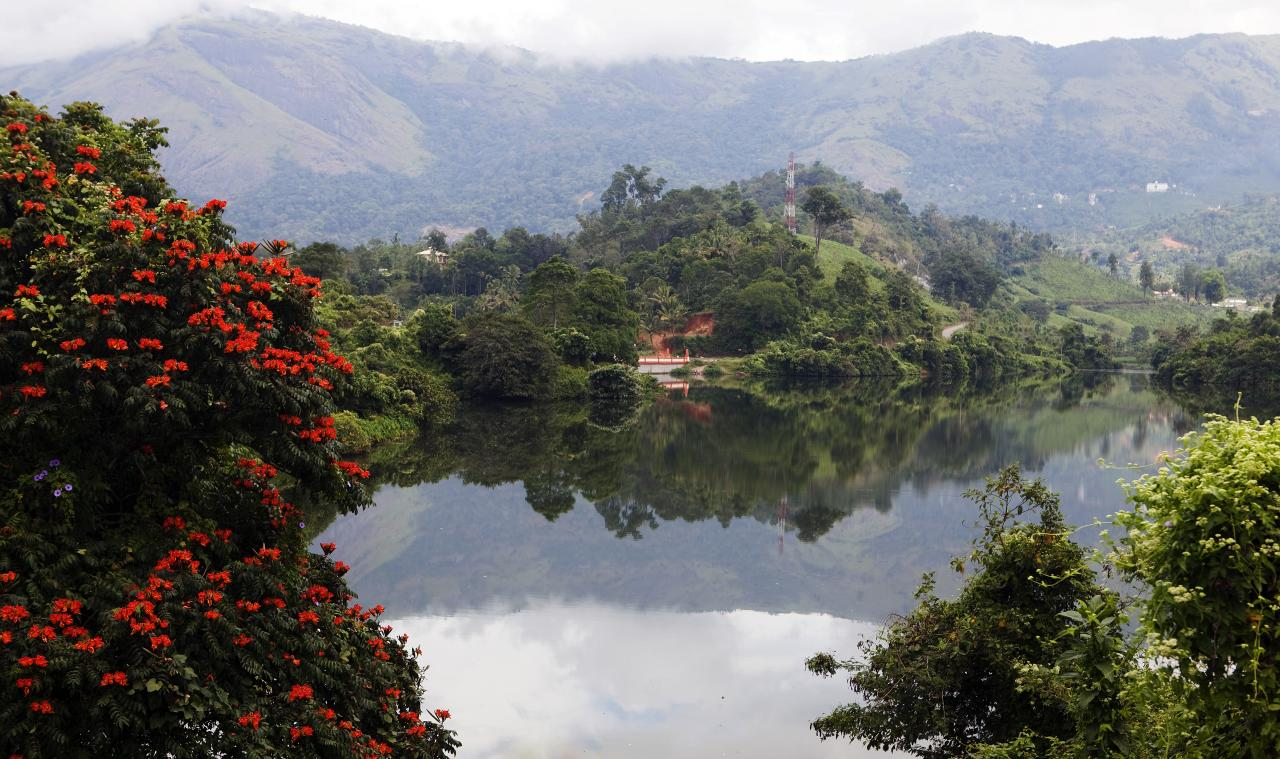
Reservoir

Sengulam reservoir formed behind the dam. The catchment area of the reservoir is approximately 5.18 km^{2} (2.00 sq mi). The tailrace discharge joins Mudirapuzha river and flows downstream to Kallarkutty reservoir.

== Specifications ==
- Release from dam to river: Sengulam Ar
- Classification: MH (Medium Height)
- Maximum Water Level (MWL): EL 849.49 m
- Full Reservoir Level (FRL): EL 847.65 m
- Storage at FRL: 0.71 Mm^{3}
- Height from deepest foundation : 26.84 m
- Length : 143.26 m
