= NJFX =

American data center and subsea cable operator

- Industry: Telecommunications
- Founder: Gil Santaliz
- Headquarters: Wall Township, New Jersey, United States
- Key people: Gil Santaliz, Managing Member
- Products: Data center services, colocation, cable landing station
- Website: www.njfx.net

NJFX, also known as New Jersey Fiber Exchange, is a Wall Township, New Jersey–based data center and subsea cable landing station operator. The company offers Tier 3 data center, meet-me room and colocation services, and a cable landing station (CLS) on a 10-acre campus.

== History ==
NJFX was founded by Gil Santaliz, a telecommunications executive who in 2008 sold metro dark fiber provider 4Connections to Optimum Lightpath, a subsidiary of New York cable operator Cablevision (now Altice USA). Tata Communications is a founding partner of NJFX.

NJFX opened a meet-me room (MMR) within Tata Communication's Wall, New Jersey subsea cable landing station (CLS). One of Tata's cables terminating in the cable landing station is the Seabras-1 undersea cable, which links North America and Brazil, with a landing point in São Paulo. Tata's TGN Atlantic subsea cable also lands in Wall Township, connecting to Highbridge, Somerset, United Kingdom. As the MMR operator, NJFX manages the network connections between its own customers and those of Tata Communication's CLS.

In September 2015, NJFX announced they would be constructing a 64,000 sq ft Tier III data center adjacent to Tata's CLS, providing direct access to their European and South America subsea cables. Design was done by Boston-based Bala Consulting Engineers.

In January 2016, voice and data network provider Windstream announced it was extending its 100 Gigabit Ethernet (100G) network from NJFX's presence at the CLS to Ashburn, Virginia's Internet hub.

In January 2017, its Tier III center was completed.

In September 2018, the company announced that the HAVFRUE transatlantic submarine network cable would be landing at its Wall, New Jersey, cable landing station. The cable runs between New Jersey and Denmark, with branches to Norway and Ireland.

In March 2019, Amazon Web Services signed an agreement with Norwegian infrastructure company Bulk Infrastructure to use the upcoming HAVFRUE cable at its United States termination points at NJFX's campus, along with termination points at Dublin, Norway and Western Denmark.

In December 2020, the 7851km HAVFRUE cable went into service as the first new undersea cable traveling from Northern Europe to the US in nearly 20 years. It terminated at the NJFX facility in Wall, NJ, and its capacity services were marketed by operator Aqua Comms under the name American Europe Connect-2 (AEC-2).

In February 2024, the company's NJFX Utility Service subsidiary acquired transatlantic cable assets including bore pipes and conduits connecting to NJFX's facility, from underseas cable developer SubCom.

In December 2025, NJFX announced it was building a 10MW high-density AI data hall, to accommodate the growth in AI data demand. Expected to be completed by the end of 2026, the company claimed the hall would be the first purpose-built cable landing station campus in North America to support liquid-to-chip AI-ready infrastructure.

== Services ==
NJFX operates a 10 acre data center campus in Wall Township, New Jersey, offering meet-me room, data center and colocation services to business customers. The 64,800 square foot center is adjacent to a substation operated by Jersey Central Power & Light (JCP&L), a subsidiary of energy giant FirstEnergy. The NJFX campus also contains a cable landing station serving four subsea cables linking North America to Europe and South America, including the HAVFRUE AEC-2 cable connecting to Northern Europe, as well as Tata's TGN1 and TGN2 cables, and Seaborn Networks' Seabras cable. As of December 2025, the company reported that it hosted 35 network operators at its data center.< Notable clients include Google, Facebook, US telecommunications company CenturyLink (now Lumen Technologies), Verizon Communications, and Amazon Web Services.
