= Aircel =

Defunct Indian telecommunications company

AIRCEL
- Type: Private
- Industry: Telecommunications
- Founded: 1999; 27 years ago (in Tiruvannamalai, Tamil Nadu, India; Registered at Coimbatore, Tamil Nadu, India)
- Founder: Chinnakannan Sivasankaran
- Defunct: 2018; 8 years ago
- Fate: Filed for bankruptcy
- Headquarters: Opus Centre, 47, Central Road, MIDC, Andheri, Mumbai, Maharashtra, India
- Services: Mobile telephony, wireless broadband
- Owners: Maxis Communications (74%); Apollo Hospitals (Sindya Securities and Investments 26%)
- Website: aircel.com

Aircel Ltd. stylised as AIRCEL, was an Indian mobile network operator headquartered in Mumbai that offered voice and 2G, 3G and 4G data services. Maxis Communications held a 74% stake and Sindya Securities and Investments held the remaining 26%. Aircel was founded by Chinnakannan Sivasankaran and commenced operations in Tamil Nadu in 1999. It was once a market leader in Tamil Nadu and had considerable presence in Odisha, Assam and North-East telecom circles. 2G and 3G Services including voice were shut down in all circles after failure of merger talks with Reliance Communications.

== History ==
Aircel was founded by Chinnakannan Sivasankaran from Kovilur village, Cheyyar taluk, Tiruvannamalai district and started its operations in the Tamil Nadu telecom circle in 1999. It became the leading operator in Tamil Nadu and one of the fastest growing mobile operators in India. Malaysian telecom company Maxis Communications bought a 74% stock in the company from Sivasankaran in 2005. The remaining 26% stock is held by Sindya Securities and Investments promoted by Suneeta Reddy, managing director of Apollo Hospitals. In 2012, as a part of a major re-organization in its operations, the company scaled down its operations in five telecom circles, namely Madhya Pradesh, Punjab, Haryana, Rajasthan and Gujarat. On 14 September 2016, Reliance Communications and Aircel announced the merger of their mobile network operations. Following the merger, the joint entity was expected to become India's fourth largest telecom operator in term of consumer base and revenues. A year later, however, both the companies called off the deal citing regulatory and legal issues.

Aircel had planned to shut down its operations in unprofitable circles including, Gujarat, Maharashtra, Haryana, Himachal Pradesh, Madhya Pradesh and Uttar Pradesh (West) from 30 January 2018. The Telecom Regulatory Authority of India (TRAI) asked Aircel to report the number of subscribers who have ported out from Aircel in these six circles. In cases, where the porting process could not be completed TRAI has asked the reasons for it. After the failed merger deal with Reliance, Aircel had considered merging with Bharti Airtel, whose chairman Sunil Mittal had stated in November 2017, that Airtel "was open to acquisition talks". As of December 2017, Aircel was under a debt of around ₹16,000 crore (US$1.7 billion).

== Services ==
=== 3G ===
On 19 May 2010, the 3G spectrum auction in India ended. Aircel paid ₹ 65 billion for spectrum in 13 circles: Andhra Pradesh, Assam, Bihar, Jammu & Kashmir, Karnataka, Kerala, Kolkata, Madhya Pradesh and Chhattisgarh, North East, Odisha, Punjab, Tamil Nadu, UP East and West Bengal. It paid US$1.44 billion (₹ 79.1 billion) for the 3G spectrum. The company, as of November 2012 had about 5 million 3G customers. Following the key players in 3G, Aircel also slashed its 3G tariff. In 2011, Aircel became the launch partner for Apple iPhone 4 along with Bharti Airtel.

=== 4G ===
In June 2010, Aircel paid ₹ 34.38 billion for acquiring wireless broadband spectrum in eight circles: Andhra Pradesh, Assam, Bihar and Jharkhand, Jammu & Kashmir, North East, Odisha, Tamil Nadu and West Bengal. Aircel launched 4G services in Tamil Nadu and Jammu & Kashmir in August 2014, becoming the only private telecom operator to offer all the three existing technologies of 2G, 3G and 4G in these markets. Chinese equipment maker ZTE announced on 30 December 2013, that it had won a contract to deploy a 4G broadband network based on LTE technology for Aircel. The LTE network will be launched in Tamil Nadu and will be expanded later to other circles. On 16 July 2014, it launched 4G services in four circles Andhra Pradesh, Assam, Bihar and Odisha.

=== Business Solutions ===
Aircel Business Solutions (ABS), part of Aircel, sold enterprise solutions such as Multiprotocol Label Switching virtual private networks (MPLS VPNs), Voice over Internet Protocol (VoIP) and managed video services on wireless platforms including WI-MAX.

== Network connectivity ==
Aircel offered poor network coverage in Delhi & NCR circle. It used radio link time out technology without which the call drop rates will be significantly higher and many customers reported this. In a 2015 survey conducted by Mint and Insta Vaani in New Delhi, Mumbai, Bengaluru, Chennai, Hyderabad, Ahmedabad and Kolkata, it was found that Aircel offered the best service among all the telecom providers in the respective cities.

== Operations ==
As of December 2017, Aircel had a subscriber base of over 84.93 million and was India's sixth-largest GSM mobile service provider. With presence in 22 circles, Aircel was a market leader in Tamil Nadu and had considerable presence in Odisha, Assam and North-East circles. In 2012, as a part of a major re-organization in its operations, the company scaled down its operations in five telecom circles, namely Madhya Pradesh, Gujarat, Haryana, Kerala and Punjab. In April 2015, Aircel relaunched its service in Kerala.

Now Aircel is under the Corporate Insolvency Resolution Process From 12 March 2018.

== Sponsorship and brand ambassadors ==
Aircel was the main shirt sponsor of Indian Premier League cricket team Chennai Super Kings and I-League football team Shillong Lajong FC. Aircel was also the principal sponsor for Atlético de Kolkata FC who play in the Indian Super League football competition. It was also a major sponsor of the Chennai Open ATP tennis tournament and the Professional Golf Tour of India. Aircel also sponsored the Save the Tiger campaign for protecting India's tigers. The brand ambassadors of Aircel included the Indian cricket team captain Mahendra Singh Dhoni and Tamil actor Suriya. Aircel also engaged with boxer Mary Kom, Tamil actors Dhanush and Sameera Reddy.

== Controversies ==
Aircel is being investigated by CBI for alleged irregularities in the Maxis takeover. According to CBI, Aircel's previous owner C. Sivasankaran was forced to sell his stake to Maxis by the then Telecom Minister Dayanidhi Maran in 2005 in return for Maxis' investment of Rs. 5 billion in a DTH company owned by the Maran family. There were also rumours in September 2012 that the Russian company Sistema was in talks to acquire Aircel which wasn't confirmed by either companies. Aircel was one among seven operators to receive notices from the Department of Telecommunications for not meeting radiation norms in their base tower stations in September 2012. On 28 February 2018 Aircel filed for bankruptcy at NCLT.

== See also ==
- Mobile network operators of India
