= Kannimara Teak =

Large teak tree in Kerala State, southwestern India

Coordinates: 10°25′59″N 76°45′01″E

- Interactive map of Kannimara Teak
- Native name: കന്നിമര തേക്ക് (Malayalam)
- Species: Teak (Tectona grandis)
- Location: Parambikulam Tiger Reserve, Muthalamada, Palakkad, Kerala, India
- Height: 41.83 m (137.2 ft)
- Girth: 7.24 m
- Custodian: Kerala Forest and Wildlife Department

The Kannimara Teak is one of the world's biggest living teak (Tectona grandis) trees. It is found at Parambikulam Tiger Reserve in Palakkad district, Kerala. It stands at a height of 41.83 meters and has a girth of 7.24 meters (measured at breast height), with an estimated age of approximately 500 years. In recognition of its significance, the Government of India awarded the tree the Mahavriksha Puraskar (Great Tree Award) in 1994.

== Etymology ==
The name originated from two Malayalam words Kanni, meaning virgin and Mara, meaning tree. The Kannimara Teak was worshipped by the tribal people as it is associated with ‘Saptha Kanniayar’ (the seven virgin guardian angels).

== Tourism ==
Kannimara Teak is a major tourist attraction in Parambikulam Tiger Reserve. It is located 10 km from the Parambikkulam Tourism office. Tourists can visit the Kannimara Teak via forest safari buses, which are available for guided visits.
