= Keezhanthoor =

- Village
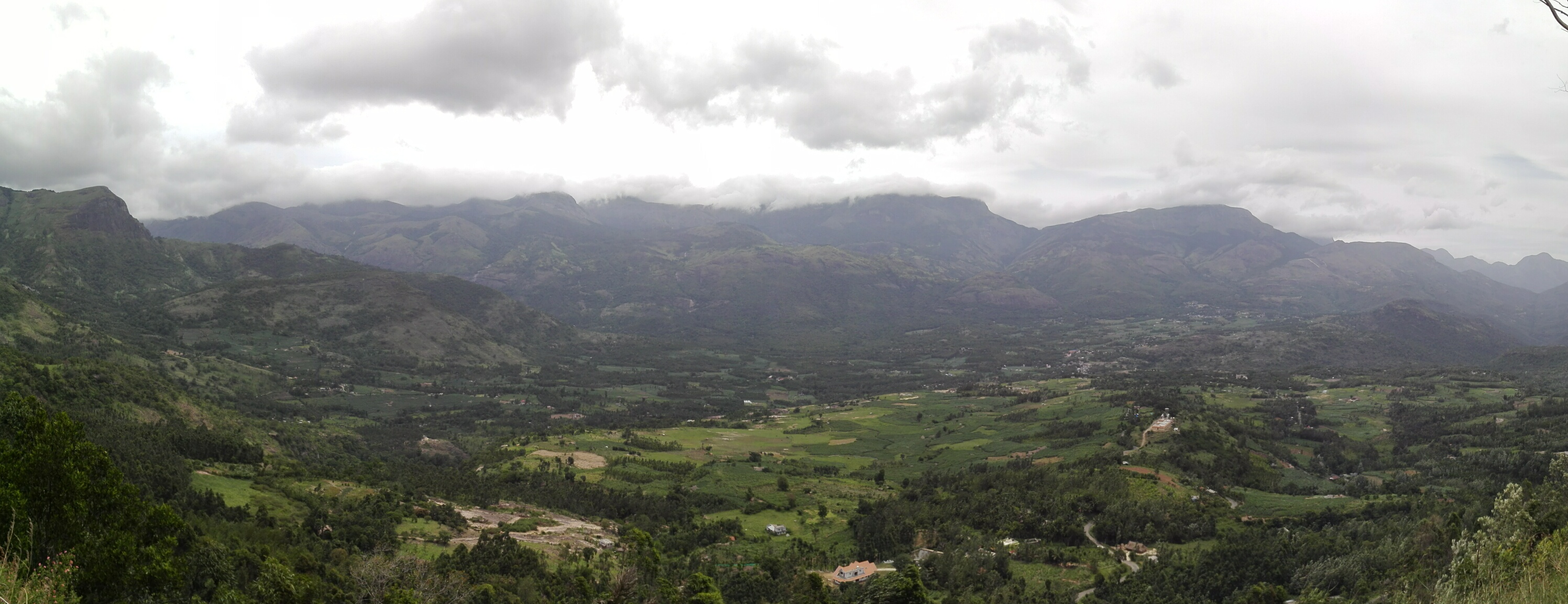
- Keezhanthoor in the foreground. Marayoor in the background. Looking WNW. Anaimalai Hills' mountain in the background.

- Location in Kerala, India Keezhanthoor (India)
- Coordinates: 10°16′0″N 77°12′0″E
- Country: India
- State: Kerala
- District: Idukki
- Taluk: Devikulam

Area
  - Total: 67.87 km^{2} (26.20 sq mi)

Population (2011)
  - Total: 4,205
  - Density: 61.96/km^{2} (160.5/sq mi)

Languages
  - Official: Malayalam, English
  - Regional: Tamil,Malayalam
- Time zone: UTC+5:30 (IST)
- PIN: 685620
- Vehicle registration: KL-68

Keezhanthoor is a village in Idukki district in the state of Kerala, in southwestern India. The village is in the Western Ghats and is known for growing apples. A Mariyamman Temple and a Vinayagar Temple are the places of devotion.

== Demographics ==
As of 2011 Census, Keezhanthoor village had a population of 4,205 of which 2,082 were males and 2,123 were females. Keezhanthoor village spreads over an area of 67.88 km^{2} (26.21 sq mi) with 1,145 families residing in it. In Keezhanthoor, 9.6% of the population was under 6 years of age. Keezhanthoor had an average literacy of 73.7% lower than the national average of 74% and state average of 94%.

== Gallery ==
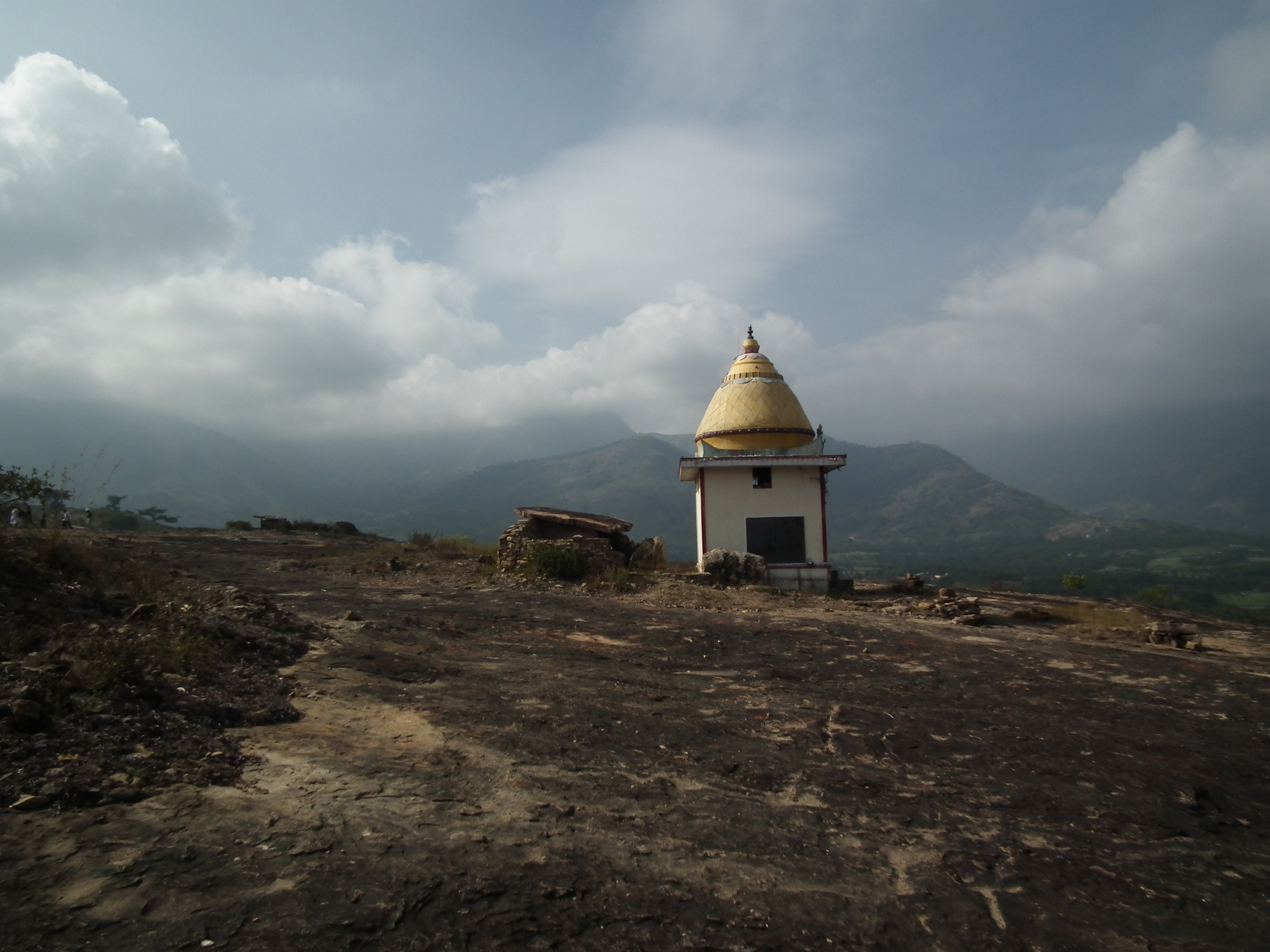
View from Anaottappara Park

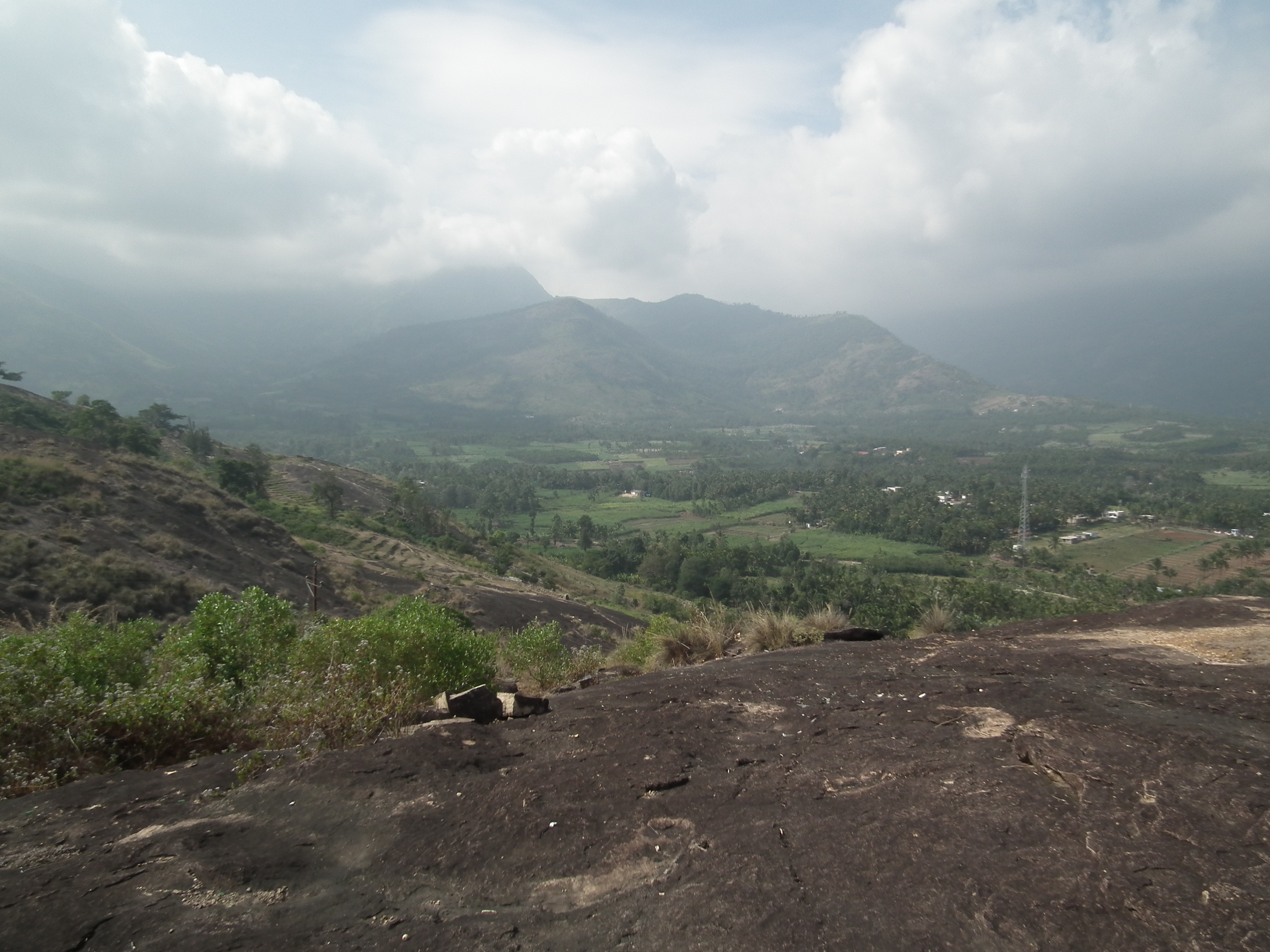
View from Anaottappara Park

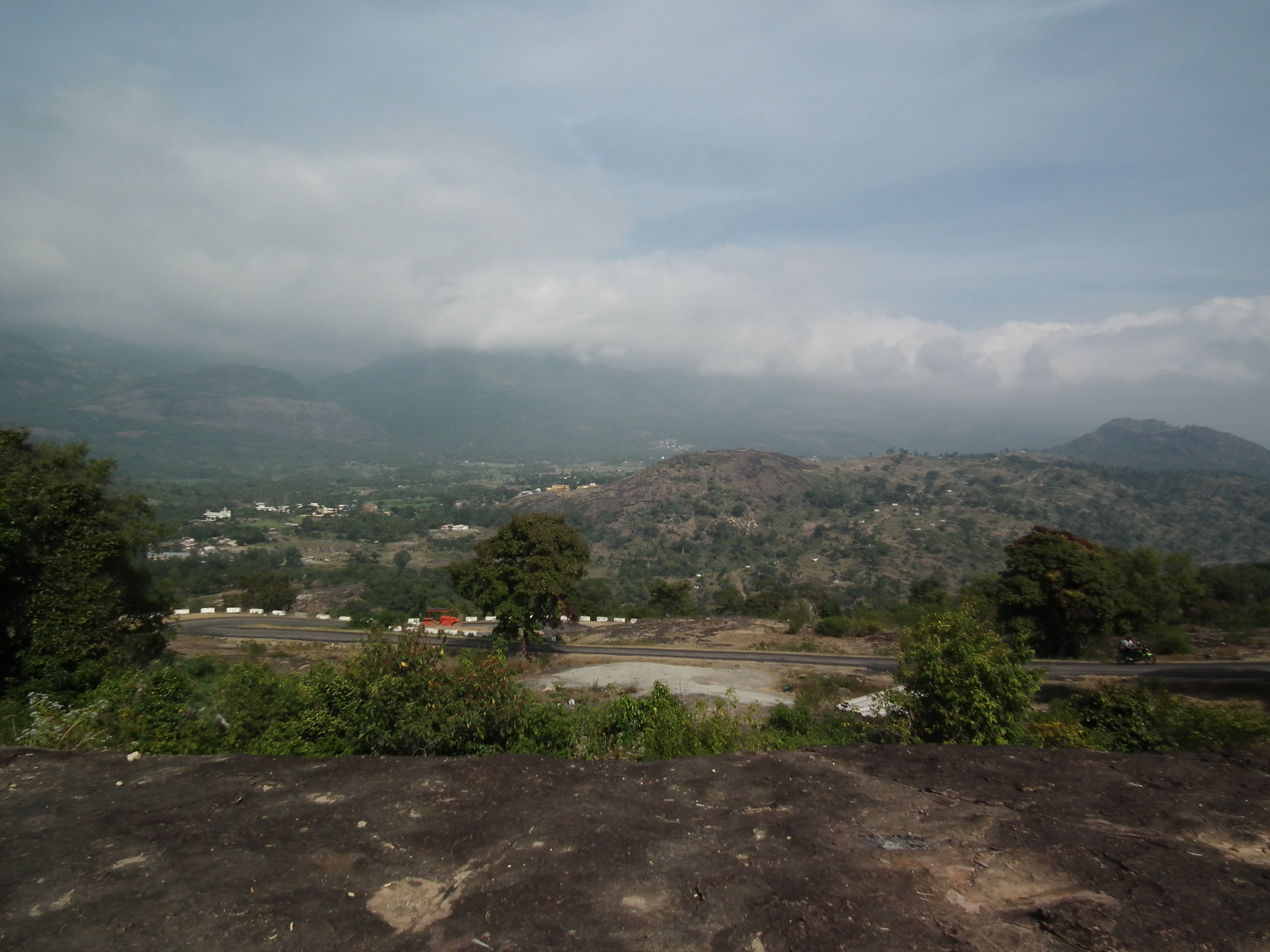
View from Anaottappara Park
