= Koviloor, Kerala =

Village in Kerala, India

Koviloor
- Village
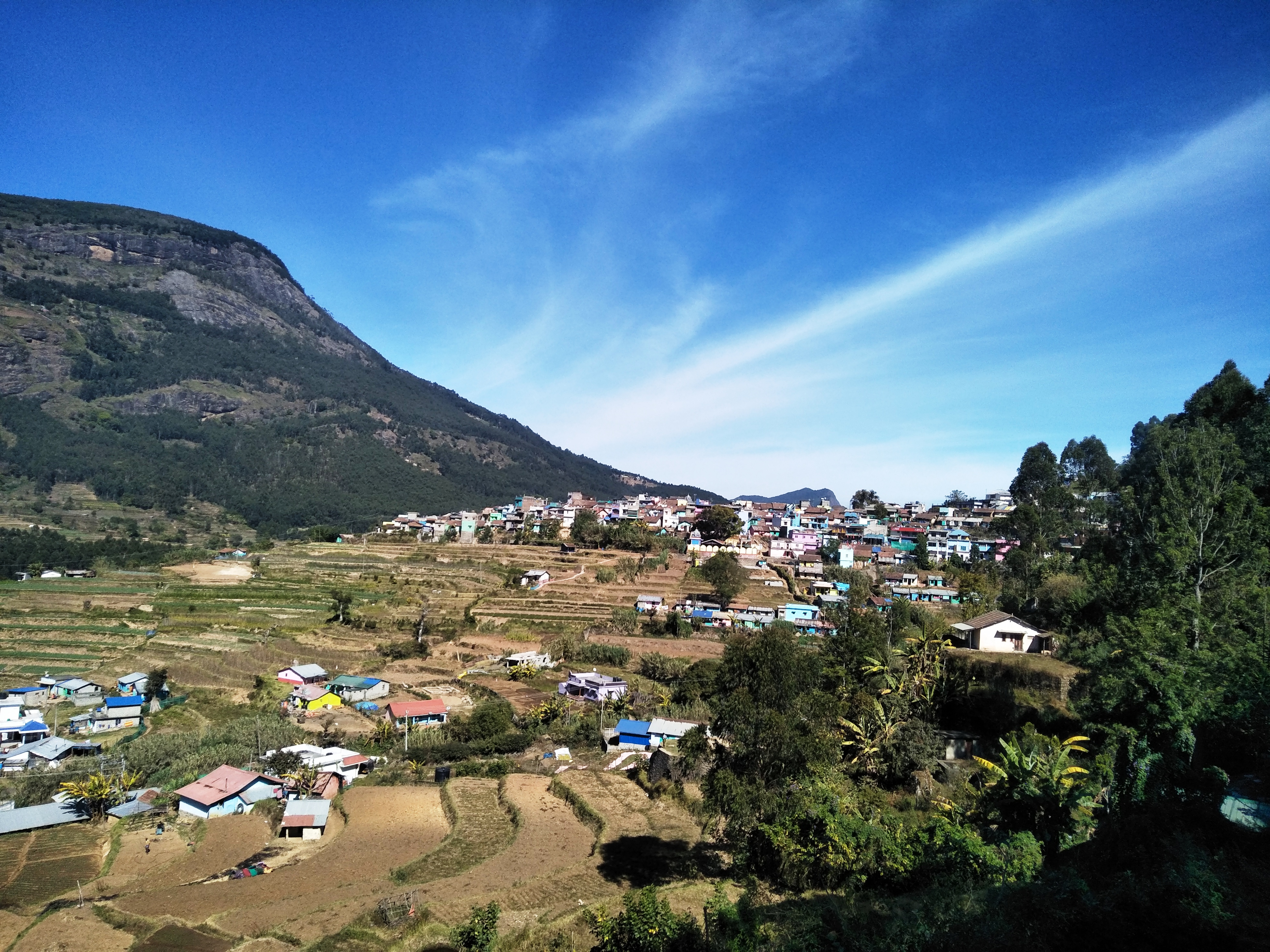
- Koviloor village
- Interactive map of Koviloor
- Location in Kerala Koviloor (India)
- Coordinates: 10°11′00″N 77°15′25″E
- Country: India
- State: Kerala
- District: Idukki
- Taluk: Devikulam

Government
  - Type: Panchayat
  - Body: Vattavada Panchayat
- Elevation: 1,700 m (5,600 ft)

Languages
  - Official: Malayalam; English
  - Regional: Malayalam; Tamil
- Time zone: UTC+5:30 (IST)
- PIN: 685615
- STD code: 04865
- Vehicle registration: KL-68 (Devikulam Sub RTO)
- Nearest town: Munnar
- Nearest airport: Cochin Airport

Koviloor is a village located in Vattavada panchayat of Devikulam taluk in Idukki district in the Indian state of Kerala. It is situated around 1,700 m (5,600 ft) above sea level near the Tamil Nadu border. It is 43 km (27 mi) east of Munnar. The village is known for growing a wide range of vegetables and fruits through terrace farming. The majority of the population speaks Tamil, as the region borders Tamil Nadu.

== Etymology ==
The name Koviloor is a combination of two Tamil words: Kovil, which means "temple" and Oor, which means "village", thus it literally means the "village of temples".

== Economy ==
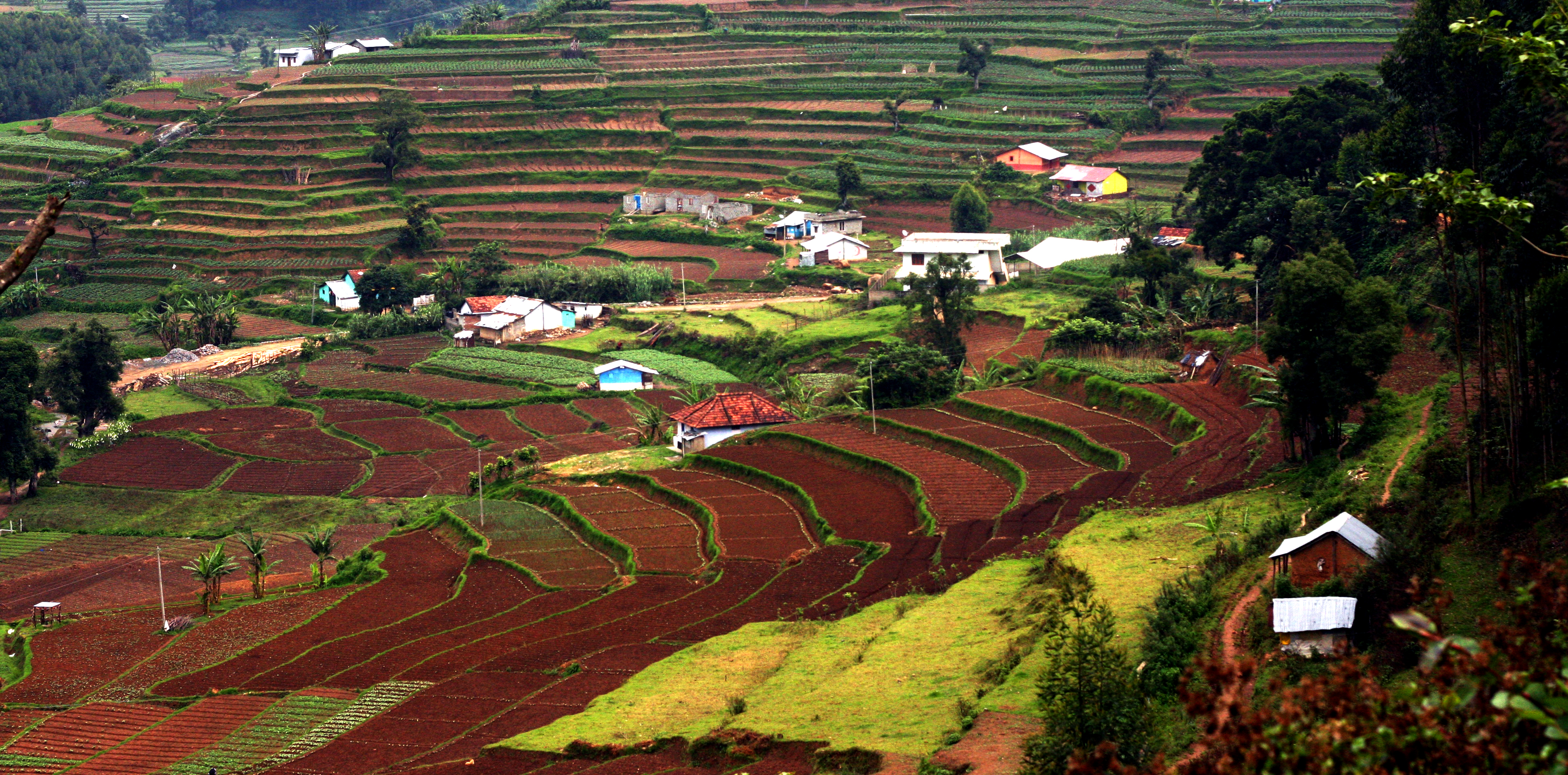
Terrace fileds near Koviloor

The economy of Koviloor is built on agriculture, with farmers constituting the majority of the population. Farms surrounding the village use traditional agricultural practices to grow crops including carrots, garlic, beans and cabbage. There are also several strawberry farms near the village.
