= Kottakamboor =

- Village
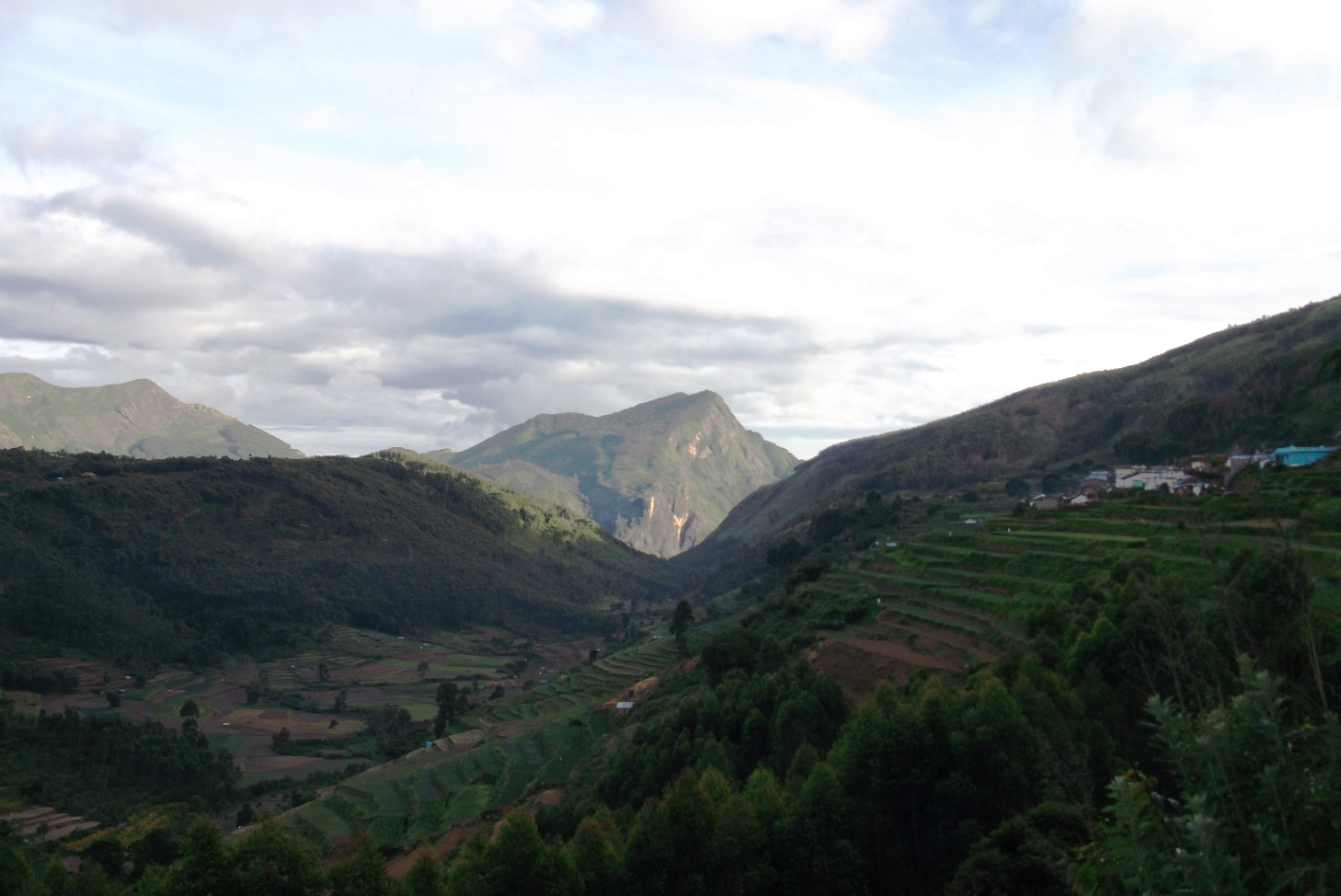
- Looking NNW.
- Interactive map of Kottakamboor
- Coordinates: 10°12′14″N 77°15′26″E
- Country: India
- State: Kerala
- District: Idukki
- Taluk: Devikulam

Area
  - Total: 36.03 km^{2} (13.91 sq mi)

Population (2011)
  - Total: 2,405
  - Density: 66.75/km^{2} (172.9/sq mi)

Languages
  - Official: Malayalam, English
  - Regional: Tamil, Malayalam
- Time zone: UTC+5:30 (IST)
- PIN: 685615
- Vehicle registration: KL-68

Kottakamboor is a village in Devikulam taluk of Idukki district in the state of Kerala, in southwestern India.

== Demographics ==
As of 2011 Census, Kottakamboor had a population of 2,405 where 1,249 inhabitants were males and 1,156 were females. Kottakamboor village has an area of 36.03 km^{2} (13.91 sq mi) with 660 families residing in it. In Kottakamboor, 11.68% of the population was under 6 years of age. Kottakamboor had an average literacy of 61.6% lower than the national average of 74% and state average of 94%.
