= TGN Atlantic =

Submarine telecommunications cable system

TGN Atlantic (TGN-A)
- Landing points: Wall Township, New Jersey, United States; Highbridge, Somerset, United Kingdom
- Total length: 12.935 km
- Design capacity: 5.12 Tbps
- Date of first use: 2001

TGN Atlantic (TGN-A) previously VSNL Transatlantic and TGN Transatlantic, is a submarine telecommunications cable system transiting the Atlantic Ocean. The cable has been in operation since 2001.

The cable was operated by the American corporation Tyco International until it was acquired for 130 million US$ by India's Videsh Sanchar Nigam Limited (VSNL) in 2005. Since 2008 VSNL was rebranded as Tata Communications and the cable was named TGN-A for Tata Global Network Atlantic.

The cable system is constructed from two separate cables routed slightly differently, but both cables terminate in the same locality at each end. Each cable is constructed with 4 fibre pairs per cable, and each fibre pair supports 64 10 Gbit/s waves at construction, allowing for a total lit capacity (at construction) of 2 cables x 4 fibre pairs x 64 10 Gbit/s waves = 5.120 Tbit/s.

It has landing points in:

- Wall Township, New Jersey, United States (two cable landing points)
- Highbridge, Somerset, United Kingdom (two cable landing points)
