= Mannamkandam =

Village in Kerala

- Village
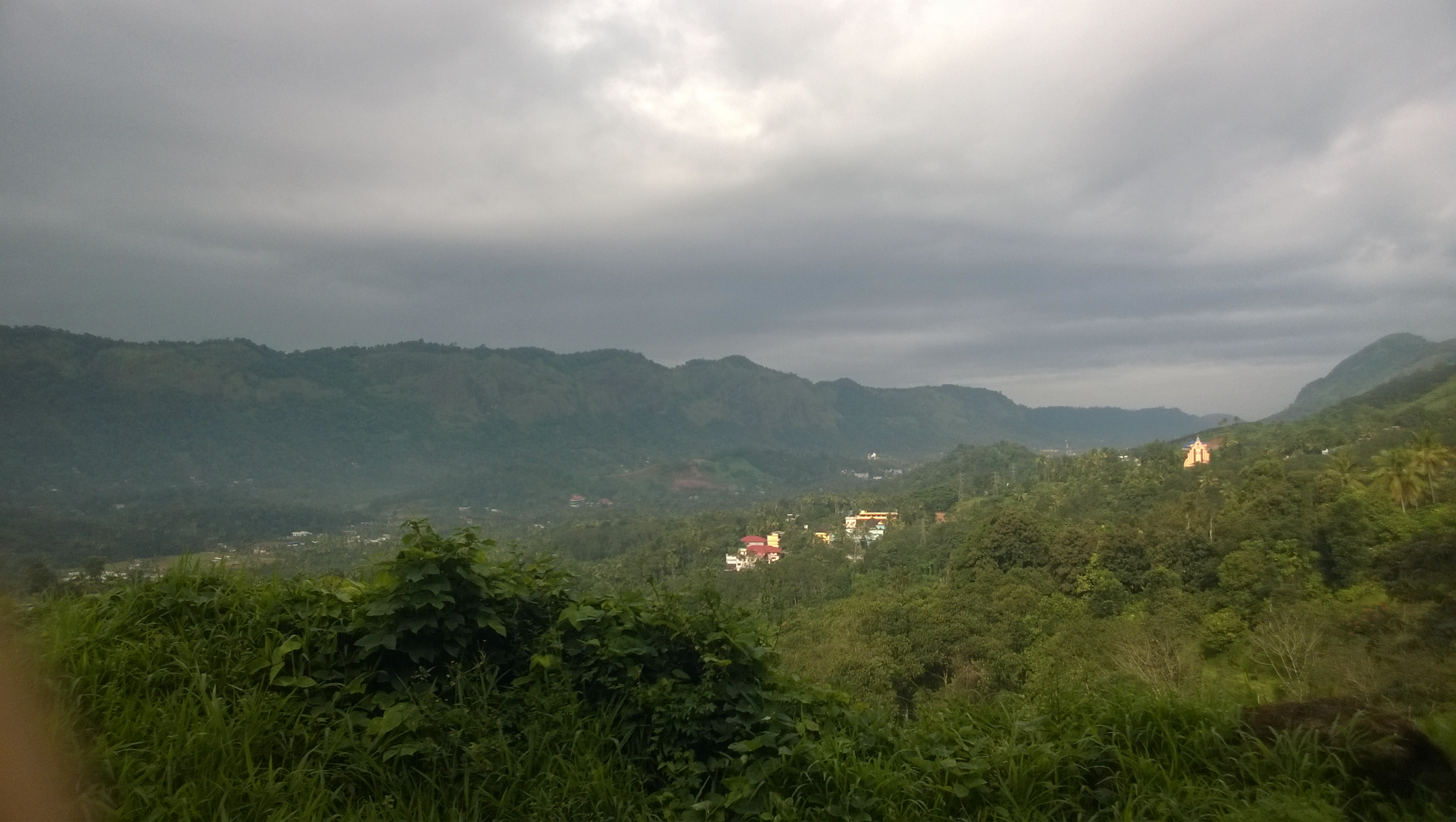
- WSW view from the eastern end limits of Mannamkandam. Taken from National Highway 85.

- Location within Kerala Location within India
- Coordinates: 10°01′38″N 76°54′39″E
- Country: India
- State: Kerala
- District: Idukki
- Taluk: Devikulam

Government
  - Type: Sarpanch

Area
  - Total: 340.88 km^{2} (131.61 sq mi)
- Elevation: 642 m (2,106 ft)

Population (2011)
  - Total: 40,593
  - Density: 119.08/km^{2} (308.42/sq mi)

Languages
  - Official: Malayalam, English
- Time zone: UTC+5:30 (IST)
- PIN: 685561
- STD code: 04865
- Vehicle registration: KL-68

Mannamkandam is a village in Devikulam Taluk, Idukki District, Kerala, India. It is located near the town of Adimali, approximately 22 kilometres northwest of the district capital Painavu, and 26 kilometres west of the taluk capital Devikulam. In 2011, it had a population of 40,593.

== Geography ==
Mannamkandam is located west of the Cardamom Hills. The National Highway 85 passes through the village. It has an area of 34088 hectares.

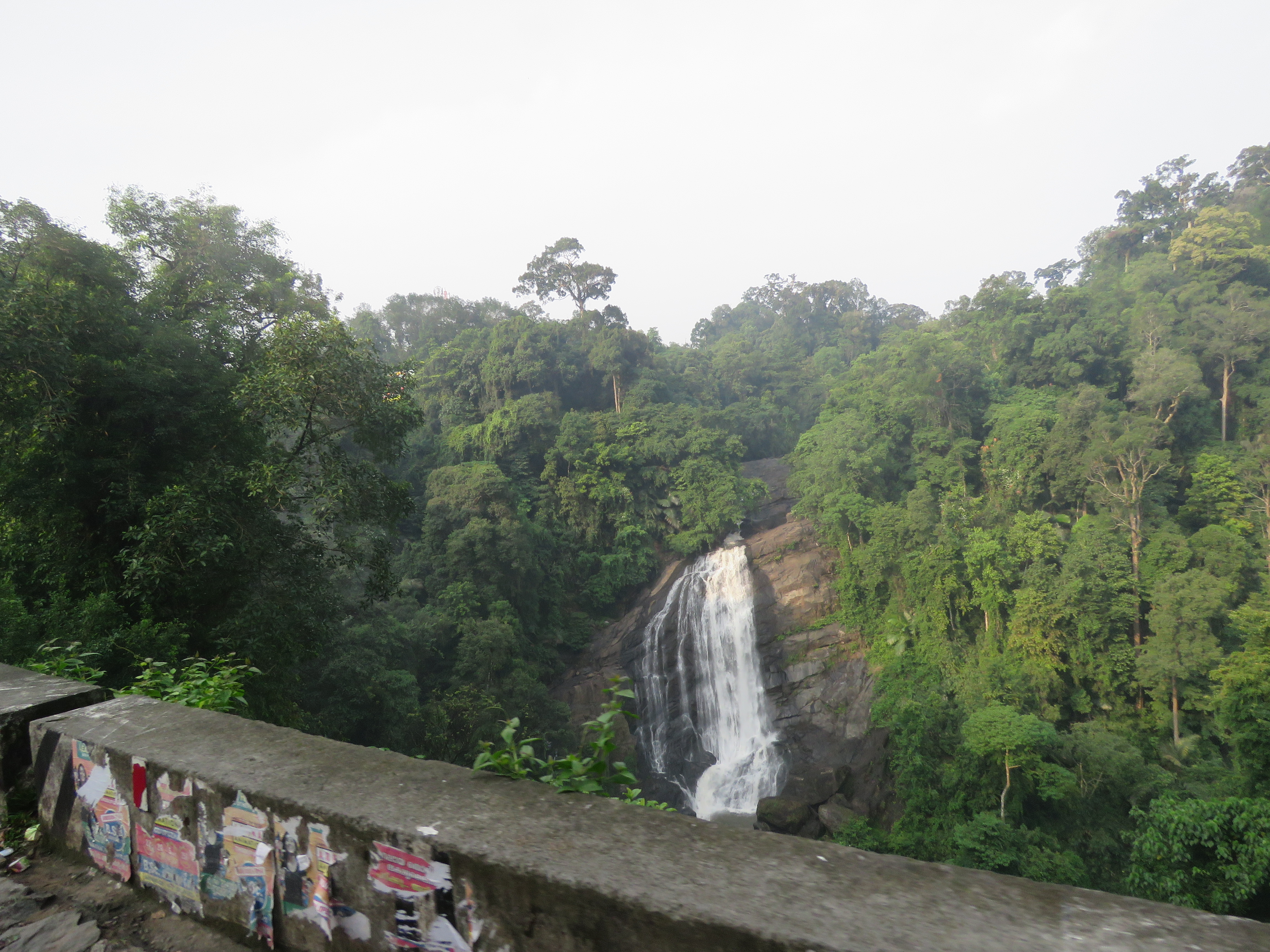
Valara Waterfalls seen from National Highway 85

== Demographics ==
According to the 2011 Census of India, Mannamkandam has 10,368 households. Among the 40,593 residents, 20,270 are male and 20,323 are female. The literacy rate is 79.27%, with 16,551 of the male population and 15,629 of the female population being literate. Its census location code is 628056.
