= Aswathy Sasikumar =

Indian Malayalam language short story writer

- Born: 1991 (age 34–35); Vellathuval, Idukki district, Kerala
- Occupation: Short story writer
- Spouse: Sunil
- Parent(s): Sasikumar; Shyamala Sasikumar
- Writing career
- Notable work: Josephinte Manam
- Notable awards: Yuva Puraskar; Kerala Sahitya Akademi Geetha Hiranyan Endowment

Aswathy Sasikumar is a Malayalam language short story writer from Kerala, India. Her first short story collection Josephinte Manam has won the 2017 Yuva Puraskar and the 2015 Kerala Sahitya Akademi Geetha Hiranyan Endowment. She has also received several other awards including Vaikkom Muhammad Basheer Awardand EP Sushama Ankanam Award.

== Biography ==
Aswathy was born in 1991, in Vellathuval, Idukki district the daughter of Sasikumar and Shyamala sasikumar. Her mother Shyamala Sasikumar initially wrote poetry but later stopped writing poetry, entered politics and became the president of the Adimali Block Panchayath. After some time, the family left Idukki and settled in Kochi, Ernakulam district. Aswathy has been writing stories since her school days. Josepinte Manam (Meaning:The Smell of Joseph) is her first published short story collection.

Aswathy is an engineer by profession. She lives with her husband Sunil, an Indian Air Force officer, in Agra, Uttar Pradesh.

== Short story collections ==
- Josephinte Manam (in Malayalam). Sahithya Pravarthaka Co-operative Society. 2012. ISBN 9780000192929.. A collection of 20 short stories, for which she won Yuva Puraskar and Kerala Sahitya Akademi Geetha Hiranyan Endowment.
- Kannu (in Malayalam). Sahithya Pravarthaka Co-operative Society. 2018. ISBN 9789387439542..
- Katha (in Malayalam). Sahithya Pravarthaka Co-operative Society. 2018. ISBN 9789388597715..

== Awards and honors ==
- Kerala Literature Academy's Geeta Hiranian Endowment Award (2015)
- Young Award of Central Literature Academy (2017)
