= Pambla Dam =

Dam in Kerala, India

Coordinates: 9°57′44.02″N 76°57′25.06″E

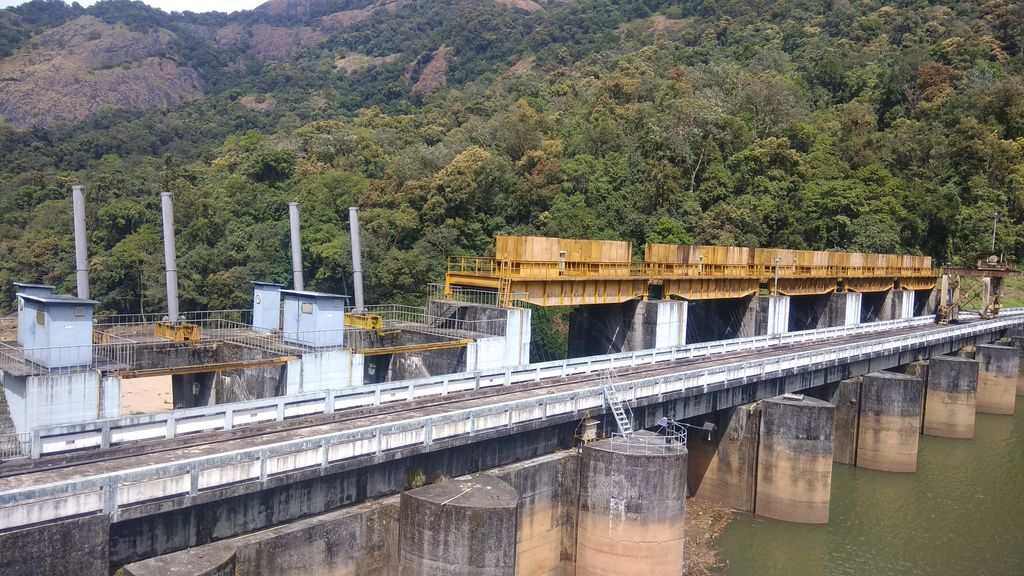
- Lower Periyar dam
- Interactive map of Pambla Dam

The Lower Periyar Dam (Pambla Dam) is a dam built on the Periyar River as part of the Lower Periyar Hydroelectric Project in Kanjikuzhi Panchayat, Idukki District, Kerala. The dam was built to generate electricity. The lower Periyar dam is at Pambla, five kilometres downstream from where Muthirapuzha merges with main river. This 32.36-metre-high dam made of concrete has a width of 284 meters. The powerhouse is at Karimanal, near Neriamangalam, where three generators are installed with a power production capacity of 60 MW each, or a cumulative 180 MW. The Dam was completed in the year 1998 Taluks through which release flow are Idukki, Kothamangalam, Muvattupuzha, Kunnathunadu, Aluva, Kodungalloor and Paravur.

== Specifications ==
- Latitude : 9⁰ 57′ 44 " N
- Longitude: 76⁰ 57′ 24" E
- Panchayath: Kanjikuzhi
- Village : Kanjikuzhi
- District : Idukki
- River Basin : Periyar
- River: Periyar
- Release from Dam to river : Periyar
- Purpose of Project : Hydro Power
- Year of completion : 1998
- Type of Dam : Concrete – gravity
- Classification : HH (High Height)
- Height from deepest foundation : 32.36 m
- Length : 284.00 m
- Maximum Water Level (MWL) : 256.00 m
- Full Reservoir Level ( FRL) : 253.00 m
- Storage at FRL : 5.30 Mm3
- Spillway : Ogee type- 5 Nos. radial gates, each of size 13.5 x 15.65 m

== Electricity generation ==
The Lower Periyar Powerhouse in Karimanal generates electricity from the dam's water. The maximum storage capacity of the dam is 253 feet. The water level in the dam is reported to the powerhouse at Karimanal every half an hour. The Hydroelectric Project was launched on 27 September 1997, to generate 180 MW of electricity using 3 turbines with a capacity of 60 MW. Kerala State Electricity Board is overseeing the dam.
