= Ashwath Aiyappa =

Indian cricketer (1983–2014)

Personal information
- Full name: Kodimaniyanda Madappa Ashwath Aiyappa
- Born: 18 November 1983; Bangalore, India
- Died: 17 April 2014 (aged 30); Kodagu, India
- Source: ESPNcricinfo, 13 May 2016

Kodimaniyanda Madappa Ashwath Aiyappa (18 November 1983 – 17 April 2014) was an Indian cricketer. He played three first-class matches for Karnataka in 2001/02. He drowned while trying to save his brother in a reservoir.
