= Devikulam taluk =

Tehsil in Kerala, India

- Taluk
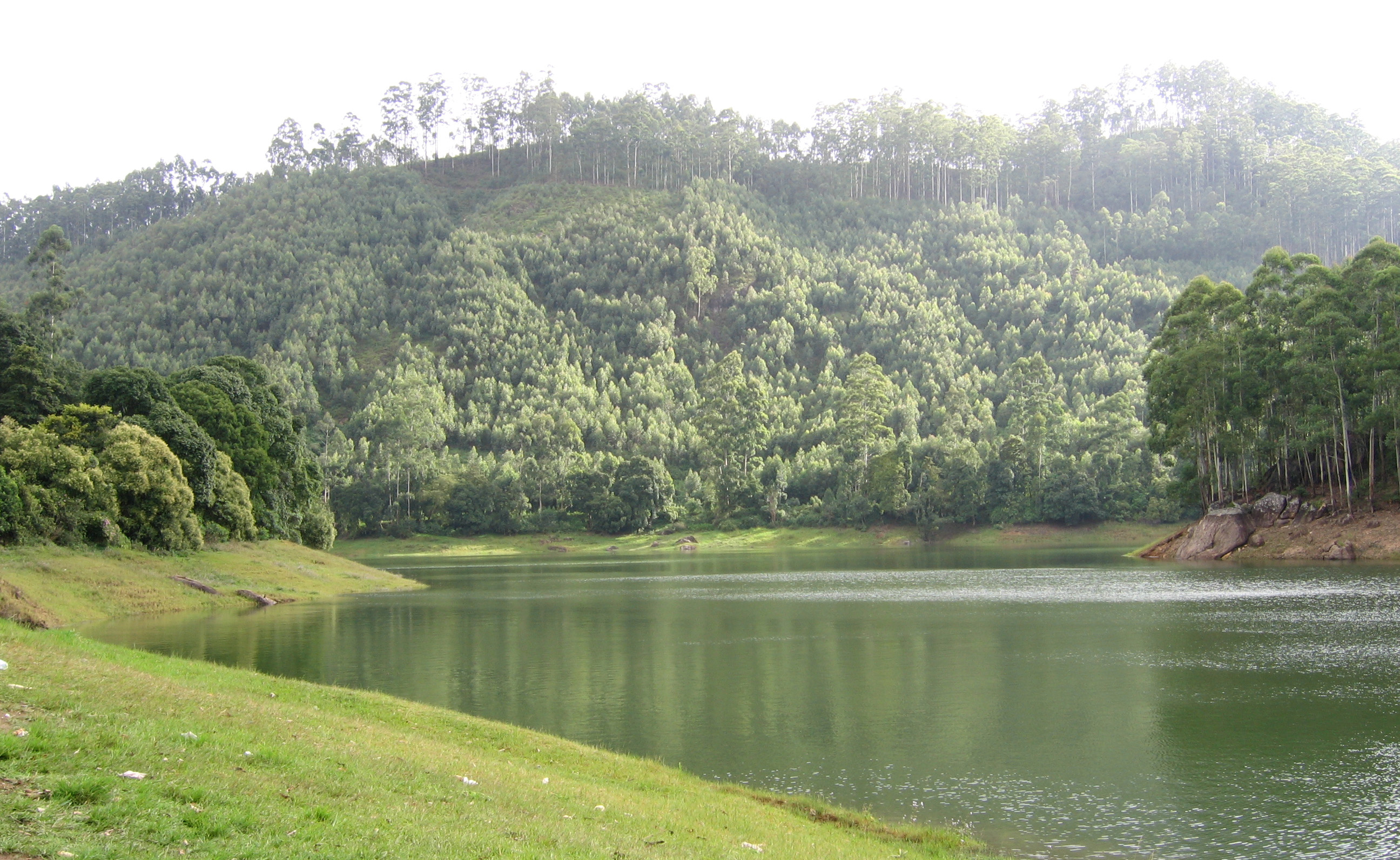
- Echo point, Munnar

- Location in Kerala, India Devikulam taluk (India)
- Coordinates: 10.0667°N 77.1073°E
- Country: India
- State: Kerala
- District: Idukki

Area
  - Total: 1,306.09 km^{2} (504.28 sq mi)

Population
  - Total: 177,621
  - Density: 135.994/km^{2} (352.224/sq mi)

Languages
  - Official: Malayalam, English
  - Regional: Malayalam, Tamil
- Time zone: UTC+5:30 (IST)
- PIN: 685613
- Telephone code: 04865
- Vehicle registration: KL 68
- Lok Sabha constituency: Idukki
- Vidhan Sabha constituency: Devikulam

Devikulam taluk is one of the 5 taluks in Idukki district of the Indian state of Kerala. Devikulam taluk comprises 13 villages.

== Constituent Villages ==
Devikulam taluk has 13 villages: Anaviratty, Kannan Devan Hills, Kanthalloor, Keezhanthoor, Kottakamboor, Kunchithanny, Mankulam, Mannamkandam, Marayoor, Munnar, Pallivasal, Vattavada and Vellathuval.

== Demographics ==
As of 2011 Census, Devikulam taluk had a population of 177,621 which constitutes 89,040 males and 88,581 females. Devikulam taluk spreads over an area of 1,052.09 km^{2} (406.21 sq mi) with 45,480 families residing in it. Population in the age group 0-6 was 17,091 (9.6%). Devikulam taluk had overall literacy of 86.29%. The male literacy rate stands at 90.85% and the female literacy rate was 81.72%.

=== Languages ===
Distribution of Language by Division of Travancore (1881)
Name of Division	Malayalam (%)	Tamil (%)
Padmanabhapuram Division	11.24	88.03
Thiruvananthapuram Division	87.05	12.09
Quilon Division	92.42	6.55
Cottayam Division	95.19	3.65
Devicolam Division	36.18	59.14

Until the late 1940s, Devikulam and Peermade had a slight Tamil majority. Following the States Reorganisation Act of 1956, a colonization project initiated by Pattom Thanu Pillai was implemented to change the demographics by relocating Malayalam-speaking families, ensuring the region remained with the new state of Kerala.

As per 2011 census Malayalam is the most spoken language followed by Tamil in Devikulam taluk. And most of the Malayalis and Tamils are proficient in both languages.

Languages in Devikulam taluk
Language	Speakers
Malayalam	55.1%
Tamil	44.1%
Others	0.78%
Distribution of languages Source: 2011 Census

=== Religions ===
Devikulam taluk constitutes major chunk of Hindus and Christians followed by Muslims and other minorities.

Religions in Devikulam subdistrict
1. Hinduism (63.2%)
2. Christianity (30.5%)
3. Islam (6.08%)
4. Sikh (0.01%)
5. Not stated (0.17%)
6. Buddhism (0.01%)
7. Jainism (0.01%)
8. Other (0.02%)
