= Muthalamada =

Gram Panchayat in Kerala, India

- Village
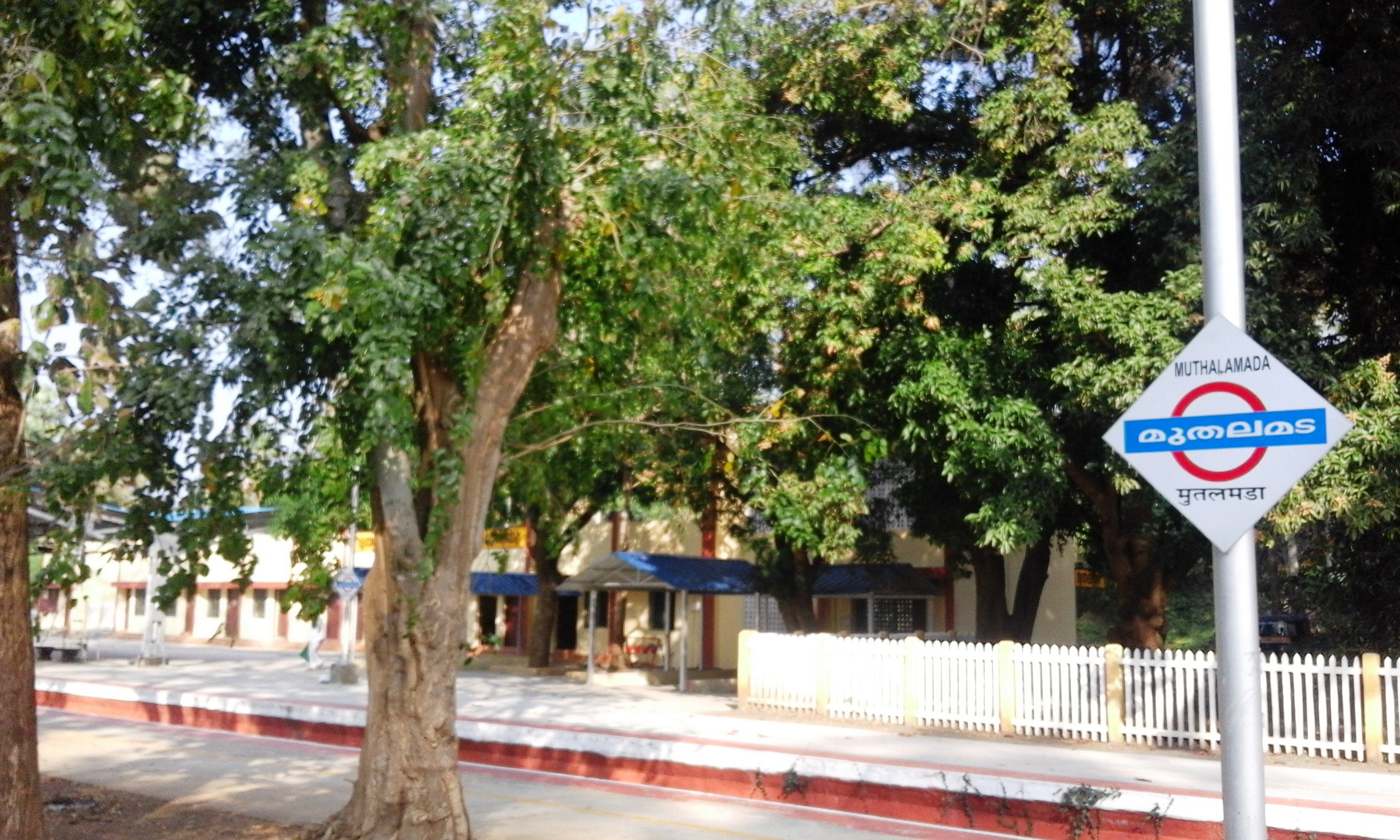
- Muthalamada Railway Station

- Location in Kerala, India Muthalamada (India)
- Coordinates: 10.6358°N 76.7987°E
- Country: India
- State: Kerala
- District: Palakkad

Government
  - Body: Muthalamada Grama Panchayat

Area
  - Total: 66.76 km^{2} (25.78 sq mi)

Population (2011)
  - Total: 37,060
  - Density: 555.1/km^{2} (1,438/sq mi)

Languages
  - Official: Malayalam, English
- Time zone: UTC+5:30 (IST)
- Vehicle registration: KL-70

Muthalamada is a Grama Panchayat in the Palakkad district of Kerala, India. It is a local government organisation that serves the villages of Muthalamada-I and Muthalamada-II. Muthalamada panchayat is one of the largest mango producing areas. The climate and soil is very suitable for mango growing, and the area mainly exports to the UAE and northern states. The nearest town of Muthalamada is Kollengode.

The nearest railway station is Muthalamada between Pollachi and Palakkad Jn. Parambikulam wildlife sanctuary is in this panchayat. It is famous for Kannimara Teak wood and wildlife safari.

== Image gallery ==
Para, Elappalli

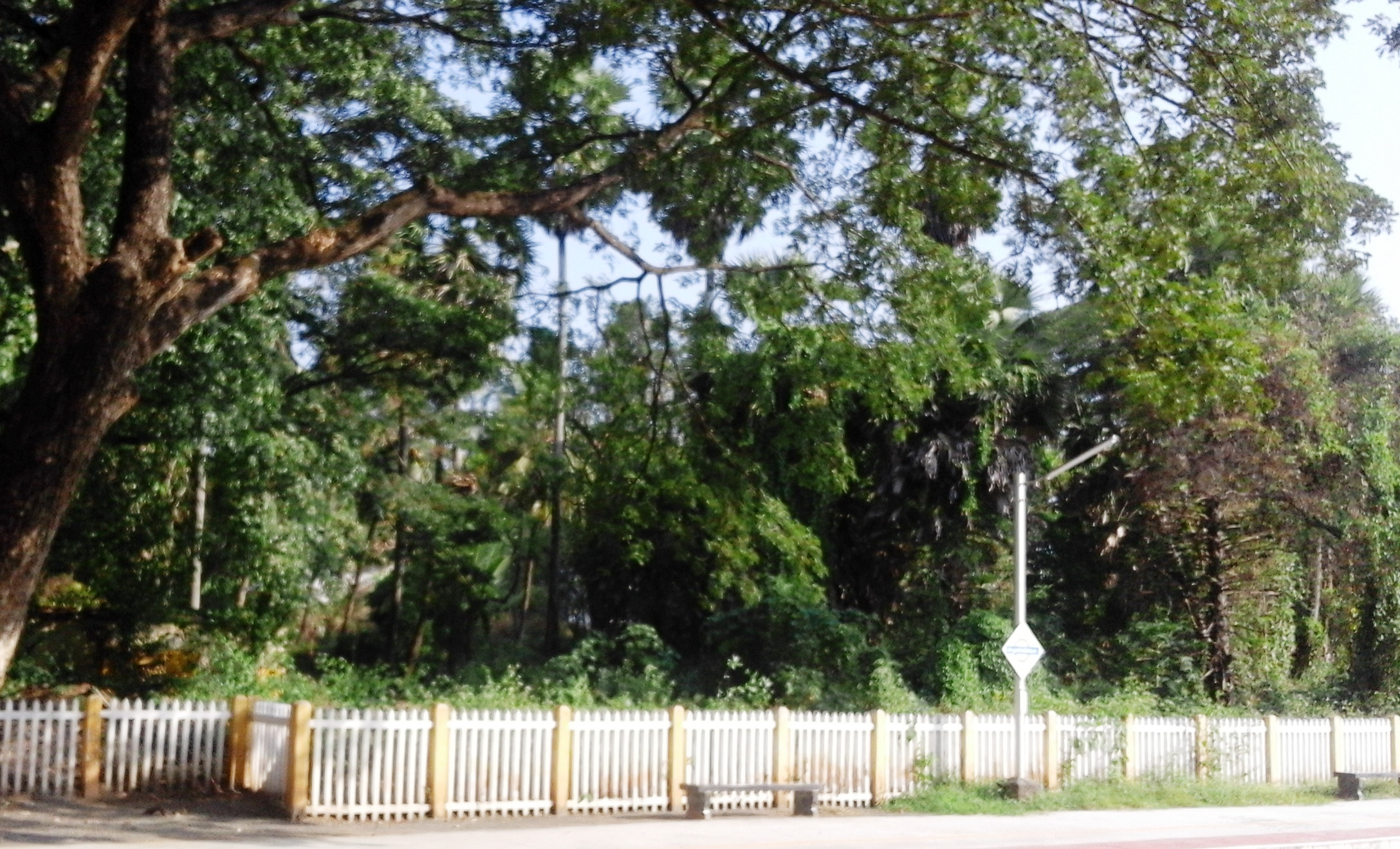
Muthalamada
