= Anaviratty =

- village
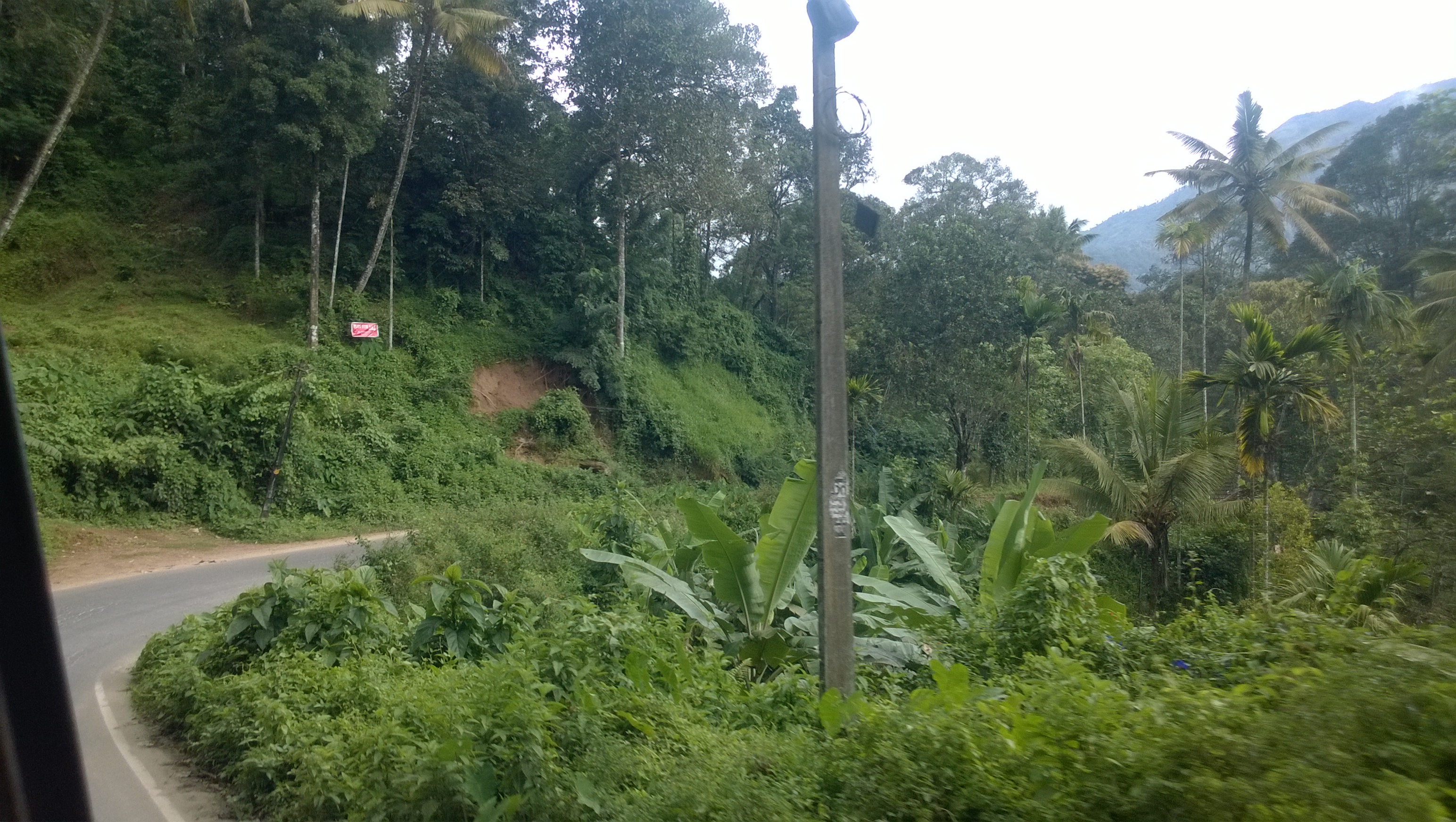
- National Highway 85 in Anaviratty

- Location in Kerala, India Anaviratty (India)
- Coordinates: 10°0′0″N 76°59′0″E
- Country: India
- State: Kerala
- District: Idukki

Area
  - Total: 23.92 km^{2} (9.24 sq mi)

Population (2011)
  - Total: 5,050
  - Density: 211/km^{2} (547/sq mi)

Languages
  - Official: Malayalam, English
- Time zone: UTC+5:30 (IST)
- Telephone code: 04864

Anaviratty is a village in Idukki district in the Indian state of Kerala.

== Demographics ==
As of the 2011 census, Anaviratty had a population of 5,050, comprising 1,257 families. The average sex ratio was 976, lower than the state average of 1084, with 2,555 males and 2,495 females. In Anaviratty, 10% of the population was under 6 years of age. Anaviratty had an average literacy of 89.1%, higher than the national average of 74% and lower than the state average of 94%; male literacy was 93.3% and female literacy was 84.9%. Anaviratty village has an area of 23.92 km^{2} (9.24 sq mi).

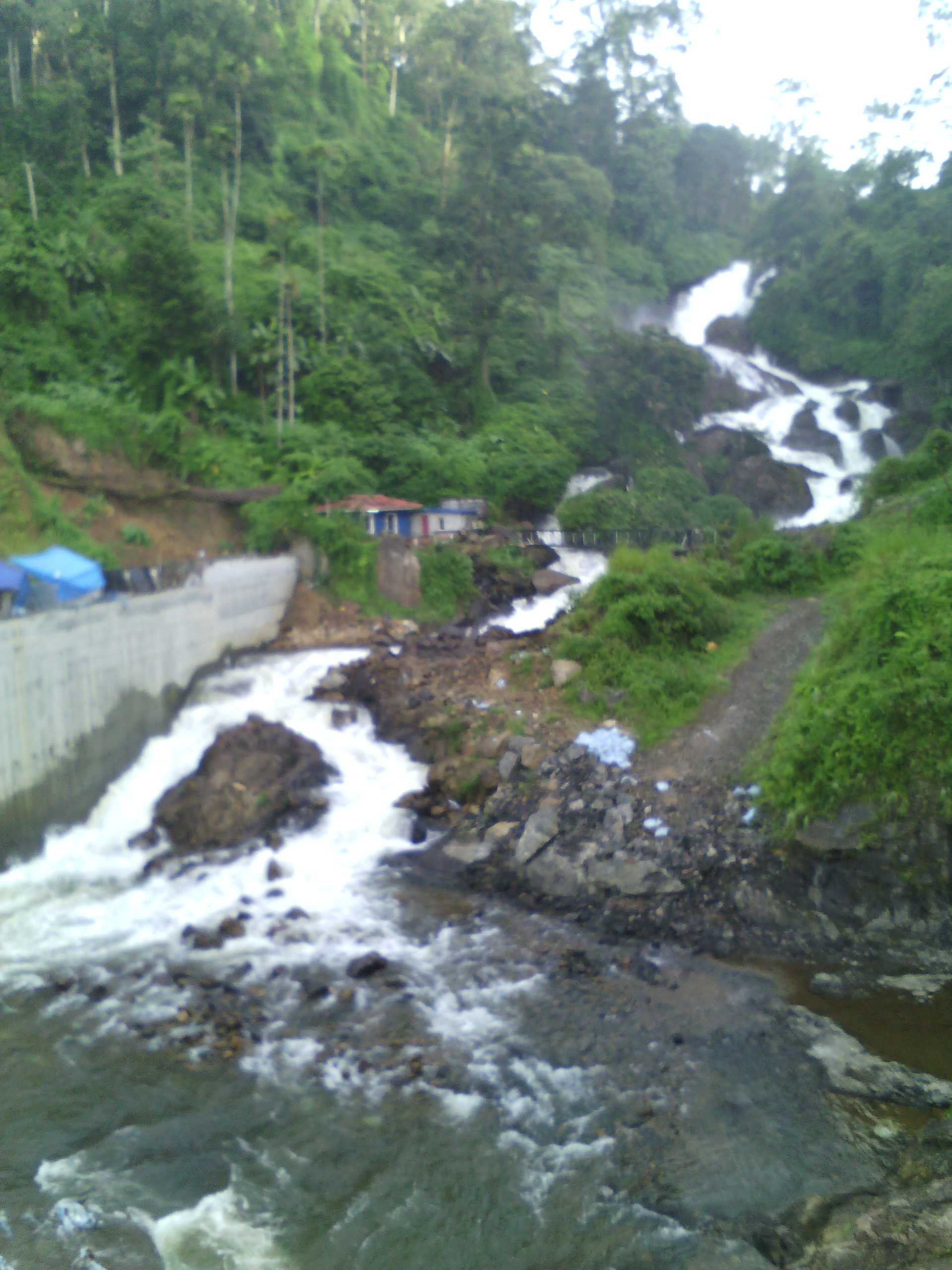
Kallar Vattiyar Waterfalls
