= Kovilur, Ariyalur =

Kovilur
- village
- Country: India
- State: Tamil Nadu
- District: Ariyalur

Population (2001)
  - Total: 2,867

Languages
  - Official: Tamil
- Time zone: UTC+5:30 (IST)
- Vehicle registration: TN-
- Coastline: 0 kilometres (0 mi)
- Sex ratio: 949 ♂/♀
- Literacy: 54.31%

Kovilur is a village in the Ariyalur taluk of Ariyalur district, Tamil Nadu, India.

== Demographics ==
As of 2001 census, Kovilur had a total population of 2,867 with 1,471 males and 1,396 females.
