= B. K. Syngal =

Indian computer engineer (1940–2022)

Brijendra K Syngal
- Born: 1940; Ambala, Punjab Province, British Raj
- Died: 9 July 2022 (aged 82)
- Education: IIT, Kharagpur
- Known for: Telecommunications
- Awards: IET Achievement Medal
- Scientific career
- Workplaces: VSNL India

Brijendra Kumar Syngal (1940 – 9 July 2022) was an Indian telecommunications executive who was referred to as the ‘Father of Indian Internet’. His five-decade career included executive positions in the major and public sector telecom companies in India including Chairman and Managing Director of VSNL, now known as Tata Communications India’s provider of telecommunication services, Chairman of Reliance Telecomm and Vice Chairman of BPL Communications. Syngal also served as Chairman, Commonwealth Telecommunications Organisation (London); Governor, Intelsat Board, Washington DC; and as a Councillor for the INMARSAT Council in London.

Syngal was Senior Principal, Dua Consulting, New Delhi, India. He headed the Consulting and Advisory team of Telecom Experts in the disciplines of Licensing, Regulation, Policy Formulations and Government Affairs. He provided services to a large number of Telecom Clients, both National and Multi-National, in these areas.

== Career ==
He held various technical qualifications including B.Tech. (Hons.) and M.Tech. from IIT, Kharagpur, India, C Eng (UK), M.I.E.E. (UK) and Sr. M.I.E.E. (USA). He was also a member of the London Court of International Arbitration.

One of Mr. Syngal's earliest major accomplishments included assisting Indian Space Research Organization and Department of Space with the launch of their satellite in 1992, when US-imposed sanctions prohibited use of US-based facilities for tracking of satellites during the most crucial launch phase. He was instrumental in the award of a major contract for supply of space segment capacity on the Indian INSAT system in 1994–1995. Under his chairmanship (1991-1998), VSNL launched the first publicly-available Internet plans in India in 1995.

Under Mr. Syngal's leadership, VSNL‘s gross revenues rose 215 percent from $515 million to $1.6 billion. Stock market capitalisation rose 355 percent, from $0.9 billion to $4.1 billion, profits rose 666 percent, and gross revenue per employee rose 204 percent, switched-voice traffic rose 354 percent, and data traffic rose 1091 percent. Under Mr. Syngal's stewardship, VSNL conceived, planned and executed what was at that time the biggest Global Depository Receipts (GDR) issue out of India and the third largest out of Asia (Excluding Japan). The issue was oversubscribed about ten times.

VSNL rose to become an international company, both in terms of the services it offers and its ownership. Under Mr. Syngal's chairmanship, VSNL also contributed to the explosive growth of India's software industry. The software growth increased from US$60 million in 1991 to US$2 billion in 1997–98. Employment in the software sector increased from 40,000 to 6,00,000 in the same period. In 1998, he and his team of associates joined Reliance, and remained there until his resignation in 2001. During his tenure as Reliance Infocomm chairperson, Syngal was said to be also serving as the president of the Association of Unified Telecom Service Providers of India—one of the telecom industry’s trade associations.

He has written for Business newspapers and Magazines like the Economic Times, Business India. Other contributions include "The Chakrarvyu in the Local Loop"; Telecommunications as the fourth Dimension of Transportation after Land Sea and Air; Commoditisation of Connectivity. He has also been a visiting lecturer at the Indian School of Business, Hyderabad (ISB) on Corporate Governance in the Public Sector.

== Honors and awards ==
Syngal has received many industry awards including Telecom Man of the Decade Award by Wisitex Foundation, India, Partners in Progress Award by the Government of Maharashtra for his contributions in telecommunications sector both in India and abroad.

Syngal has been the recipient of the Ambrose Fleming Medal for Achievement in Communications conferred by the Institution of Engineering and Technology (IET), UK.

He was also credited with bringing the internet to India in 1995, ahead of any Asian country, with the exception of Japan. He was named one of the '50 stars of Asia' by the Business Week magazine in 1998. He was also honored by his Alma Mater (Indian Institute of Technology Kharagpur) with a life fellowship for his contributions in the field of communications and changing the life of millions by bringing internet and digital connectivity to India.

Some of his other awards given in recognition of his outstanding achievement in the telecom sector include: "Partners in Progress" award, by the Govt. of Maharashtra, "International Excellence Award – 1994" in recognition of his outstanding contributions to the field of telecommunications both in India and abroad.

=== Bibliography ===
BK Syngal has edited two books- 'Back to the DOTs' and 'VSNL unleashed'.

== Personal life ==
Syngal died on 9 July 2022 at the age of 82.
