= Tata Communications =

Indian telecommunications company

- TIER - IV Data Centre at GIFT City
- Formerly: Videsh Sanchar Nigam Limited (1986–2008)
- Type: Public
- Traded as: BSE: 500483; NSE: TATACOMM
- ISIN: INE151A01013
- Industry: Telecommunications
- Founded: March 19, 1986; 40 years ago
- Founder: Government of India
- Headquarters: Mumbai, Maharashtra, India
- Area served: Worldwide
- Key people: Ganesh Lakshminarayanan (Managing Director and CEO); N Ganapathy Subramaniam (Chairperson)
- Services: Broadband; Internet services; IT Services; Managed services; Cloud computing; Cybersecurity; IoT; WAN
- Revenue: ▲₹23,108.59 crore (US$2.8 billion) (2025)
- Operating income: ▼₹1,378.17 crore (US$160 million) (2025)
- Net income: ▲₹2,069.64 crore (US$250 million) (2025)
- Parent: Tata Group (via Tata Sons) (58.87%); Public investors (41.13%)
- Subsidiaries: Kaleyra; The Switch; Tata Communications Canada; Tata Communications Transformation Services (TCTS); Tata Communications Collaboration Services; Novamesh Limited
- ASN: 6453
- Website: www.tatacommunications.com

Tata Communications Limited (formerly known as Videsh Sanchar Nigam Limited) is an Indian telecommunications company, headquartered in Mumbai, Maharashtra. It was a government-owned telecommunications service provider before being sold to the Tata Group in 2002 under the Third Vajpayee ministry government.

The company provides network, cloud, cybersecurity, media, Internet of Things (IoT), collaboration and digital infrastructure services to enterprises and service providers worldwide. It is listed on the Bombay Stock Exchange and the National Stock Exchange of India.

Tata Communications operates a Tier-1 IP network and a wholly owned subsea fibre-optic cable system spanning over 500,000 kilometres (310,000 miles). It provides services to enterprises across more than 190 countries and territories.

== History ==
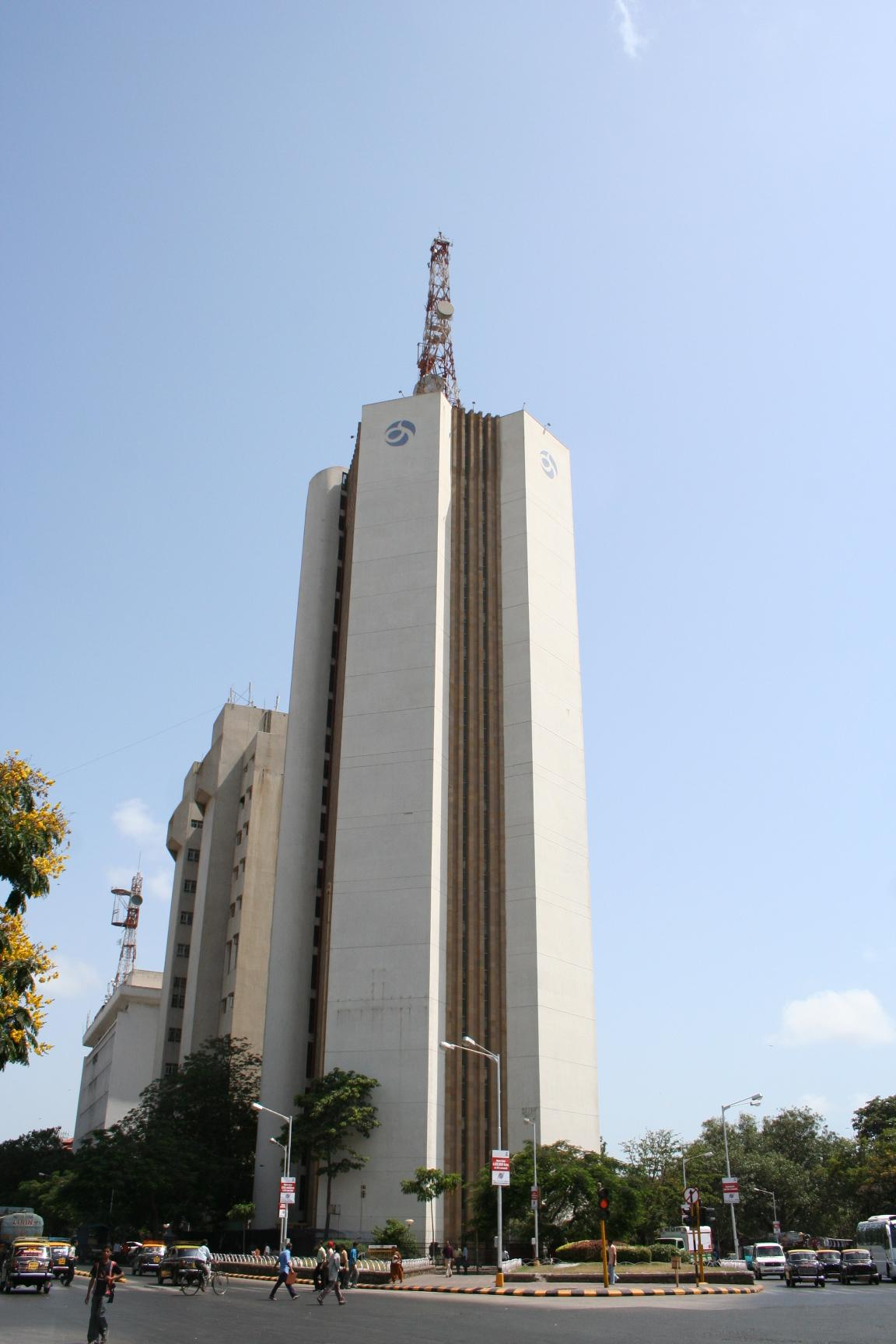
Headquarters of VSNL in Mumbai, 2006

The business was founded as Videsh Sanchar Nigam Limited (VSNL) in March 1986 by the Government of India as a public-sector undertaking to manage the country's international telecommunications services. It took over the operations of the Overseas Communications Service, a company under the Ministry of Communications. Under the chairmanship of B. K. Syngal (1991–98), VSNL launched the first publicly available internet service in India in August 1995.

After the Government of India launched its disinvestment programme, VSNL was acquired by the Tata Group in 2002. The international arm of VSNL, known as VSNL International, was established in 2004. The company was subsequently renamed Tata Communications on 13 February 2008.

In August 2009, Tata Communications and Tyco Telecommunications completed the 6,700 km TGN-Intra Asia (TGN-IA) submarine cable system, connecting Singapore, Hong Kong, Tokyo, Vietnam and the Philippines. The system was designed to provide resilient and diverse network routes that bypass seismically active areas near Taiwan.

In 2014, the company launched IZO, a cloud connectivity platform designed to enable enterprises to securely connect to multiple cloud service providers over a single network. In February 2017, it sold its South African telecommunications subsidiary, Neotel, to Liquid Telecom Group.

In March 2021, the Government of India exited its remaining 26.12% stake in Tata Communications, ending its shareholding in the company nearly two decades after its privatisation in 2002. In March 2025, it launched Vayu, a cloud fabric platform designed to support enterprise multi-cloud environments and artificial intelligence workloads.

=== Acquisitions ===
In 2004, then operating as VSNL, the company acquired the broadband assets of DishnetDSL for ₹270 crore in a slump sale from its promoter Chinnakannan Sivasankaran.

In 2005, the company acquired the Tyco Global Network, an undersea fibre-optic cable system spanning approximately 60,000 kilometres, for approximately US$130 million. The acquisition formed the backbone of what became the Tata Global Network and significantly extended the company's international reach. In 2006, it acquired Teleglobe International Holdings, a provider of international voice, data and value-added services, for approximately US$178 million.

In July 2008, the company entered into an agreement with Eskom and Transnet to acquire their combined 30% stake in South African telecommunications operator Neotel. In January 2009, the company completed the acquisition, increasing its shareholding and becoming Neotel's controlling shareholder.

In 2011, Tata Communications acquired BitGravity, a United States-based content delivery network provider. The company had previously invested US$11.5 million in BitGravity in 2008 as part of a strategic partnership. The company acquired Teleena, a Netherlands-based IoT and Mobile Virtual Network Enabler (MVNE) company in 2018. The company had previously invested in Teleena in January 2017, acquiring a 35 per cent stake. The acquisition enabled Tata Communications to access Teleena's mobile virtual network enabler platform and related technology.

In 2020, Tata Communications bought an initial majority stake of 58.1% in Oasis Smart SIM, an eSIM technology company. The acquisition was completed in 2023 when the company acquired the remaining 41.9% shares. This was followed by the company's acquisition of The Switch Enterprises LLC in 2023, a United States-based live video production and transmission company, for approximately $58.8 million in an all-cash deal, to expand its media and entertainment services division.

In 2023, Tata Communications completed its acquisition of Kaleyra in a deal valued at approximately US$100 million. The acquisition combined the two companies' customer bases and enterprise communications businesses.

In 2025, the company acquired a 51% stake in Commotion Inc., an AI-native SaaS platform operating in the United States and India, for approximately ₹227 crore.

=== Sports partnerships ===
In 2012, Tata Communications entered into a multi-year agreement with Formula One Management as the sport's official connectivity provider. The company provided network connectivity and data services for Formula One's global operations, including its official website.

The agreement ended after the 2019 season. In 2022, the partnership was renewed, with Tata Communications becoming Formula One's official broadcast connectivity provider. The company transmitted video and audio feeds from race venues to the sport's media hub in the United Kingdom.

== Operations ==
Tata Communications operates through Voice and Data segments, providing telecommunications and digital products to enterprise customers. The Voice segment covers international and national long-distance telephony, while the Data segment comprises connectivity and related products such as Ethernet, software-defined wide area networking (SD-WAN), content delivery network, cloud, security, media and Internet of Things.

The company also provides cloud infrastructure and artificial intelligence offerings. It describes its Digital Fabric platform as an architecture integrating network, cloud, interaction and IoT capabilities through a common orchestration layer.

== Financials ==
Tata Communications reported consolidated revenue of ₹23,109 crore for the financial year ending March 2025, compared to ₹20,969 crore in FY2024. Consolidated net profit (profit after tax) increased to ₹1,836 crore in FY2025, from ₹969 crore in FY2024.

== Global network ==
In 2012, the company completed its network across Egypt linking Europe to India, and created a subsea fibre network that circumnavigates the world. The 9,280-kilometre (5,770 mi) Eurasian section of the Tata Global Network runs across the Mediterranean Sea and the Middle East, connecting Mumbai with Marseille.

In January 2016, Windstream Communications announced it was extending its 100 Gigabit Ethernet (100G) network from New Jersey data center operator NJFX's presence at Tata's Cable Landing Station (CLS) in Wall Township, New Jersey, to Ashburn, Virginia's internet hub. As of 2016, Tata Communications had a data centre network located in 44 locations worldwide.

== Sustainability ==
It has set a target of achieving net-zero carbon emissions across its global operations by 2035. Its greenhouse gas emissions reduction targets have been validated by the Science Based Targets initiative, and the company has received an "A-" rating from the Carbon Disclosure Project for its climate disclosures.

The company has also adopted a sustainability-linked financing framework under which borrowing terms are tied to environmental performance targets. In 2024, it raised a US$250 million sustainability-linked loan facility from ANZ, DBS Bank, and Export Development Canada, with interest rates linked to emissions reduction targets.

== Awards and recognition ==
In March 2026, Gartner positioned the company as a 'Leader' in its Magic Quadrant for Global WAN Services for the 13th consecutive year, citing its completeness of vision and ability to execute in the wide area network market.

In 2024 and 2025, Tata Communications received four Indian Service Provider Company of the Year awards from Frost & Sullivan in the SD-WAN, Unified Communications, Multi-Cloud Connect and next-generation connectivity categories, and the Global Company of the Year Award in the Video Managed Services category.

The company has been included in the Fortune India 500 ranking of India's largest companies by revenue since 2010, ranking 58th in 2010, 68th in 2015 and 2016, and 115th in 2025.
