= Kanjikuzhi =

Kanjikuzhy
- Village
- Location within Kerala Location within India
- Coordinates: 9.85°N 76.94°E
- Country: India
- State: Kerala
- District: Idukki

Government
  - Type: Panchayath
  - Body: Kanjikuzhy grama panchayath

Area
  - Total: 227.51 km^{2} (87.84 sq mi)

Population (2011)
  - Total: 26,809
  - Density: 123/km^{2} (320/sq mi)

Languages
  - Official: Malayalam, English, Tamil
- Time zone: UTC+5:30 (IST)
- Postal code: 685606
- ISO 3166 code: IN-KL
- Vehicle registration: KL-06, KL-38

Kanjikuzhy is a village in Idukki district in the Indian state of Kerala.

== Demographics ==
As of the 2011 Census of India, Kanjikuzhi had a population of 26,809 with 13,509 males and 13,300 females.
