= DishnetDSL =

Indian internet service provider

DishnetDSL was a broadband internet service provider in India. VSNL, a part of the Tata group acquired DishnetDSL in 2004 and it is now a part of Tata Indicom Broadband.

== History ==
DishnetDSL was started by Chinnakannan Sivasankaran as part of Sterling Group in 1998. Initially DSL was a part of much bigger plan which is "Education To Home" or ETH. Dr. Vijay P. Bhatkar is the chairman for ETH and under his leadership Dishnet DSL started operations in Pune. It was the first ISP to offer DSL services in India. However, due to the model it adapted (overhead cables similar to broadcasting cable) it couldn't gain a larger customer base. This model was adapted as BSNL rejected Dishnet request to use Telecom exchanges to house DSLAM.

During 2000–2003, Dishnet aggressively connected five star hotels with DSL in every room which was considered a luxury. It worked with prestigious hotels like Leela Kempinski in Mumbai and Goa, Sun & Sand, Ritz Carlton in Mumbai, Le Meridien in Pune & some others in Chennai, Hyderabad, Bangalore, Cochin.

In 2004 it was sold to VSNL which was acquired by TATA Telecom and the assets are merged with TATA.
