= Kovilur, Tiruvannamalai =

Kovilur Covilur
- town
- Location in Tamil Nadu, India
- Coordinates: 12.59°N 79.52°E
- Country: India
- State: Tamil Nadu
- District: Tiruvannamalai
- Elevation: 99 m (325 ft)

Languages
  - Official: Tamil
- Time zone: UTC+5:30 (IST)
- PIN: 604404
- Telephone code: 91(0)4182
- Vehicle registration: TN25
- Lok Sabha constituency: Arani
- Vidhan Sabha constituency: Cheyyar

Kovilur is a village in the Tiruvannamalai District near Cheyyar Town in the Tamil Nadu state of South India and has a population of 5,123.

== Geography ==
Kovilur is located at 12.5866°N 79.5215°E in the north eastern corner of Thiruvannamali district of Tamil Nadu. It is 100 km (60 mi) southwest of Chennai the state capital. Cheyyar and Vandavasi are the two towns which are closer to Kovilur, Cheyyar 8 km (5 mi) and Vandavasi 10 km (6 mi) away.

=== Cityscape ===
Kovilur has eleven streets.

== Culture ==
Two Goddesses

=== Pongal ===
The highlighting thing in Kovilur during Pongal is Mattu Pongal, i.e. the second day of Pongal. People assemble in a particular place with their bullcarts, bulls and also cows after going around (two times) the Perumal Temple. Then Lord Murugan and Lord Venkateswara are brought to that place and the awaiting peoples get Dharisanam, then go for the Events (Which is conducting by the Raising stars) and leave back to their houses. This total action takes only three hours.

=== Sura Samhaaram ===
The Sura Samhaaram Battle where the Suran was killed by Lord Murugan is re-enacted as a drama for six days. During those days in the evening between 7 and 8 pm some of villagers acted as Lord Muruga and Titan Suran then they fight each other, on the sixth day only titan Suran was killed and to enjoy that, people use some crackers. All the peoples assemble in a particular place around 6 pm and they play games—Kabadi for men and Gummi Paattu for women until Suraamharam starts (8 pm). On the seventh day in Eswaran temple lord Murugan's Thiru Kalyanam will take place. This marks the end of the festival.
