= Vellathuval =

- village
- Country: India
- State: Kerala
- District: Idukki

Population (2011)
  - Total: 14,509

Languages
  - Official: Malayalam, English
- Time zone: UTC+5:30 (IST)

Vellathuval is a village in Idukki district in the Indian state of Kerala.

== Demographics ==
As of 2011 India census, Vellathuval had a population of 14509 with 7217 males and 7292 females.

== Schools ==
- Vellathooval Highschool

== Places of Worship ==
- Vellathooval Sree Annapurna Devi Temple
- vellathooval town juma masjid
- St George Forane Church
- St Jude Chappel
- St Alphonsa church
- Sharon Fellowship Church(Pentecostal Church)
- India Pentecostal Church of God
- Bethel Marthoma Church
- Noorul Hudha Juma Masjid Selliampara
- Sreekrishna Swami Temple
- Ayyappan Temple Vellathooval

== Offices ==
- Sengulam Hydro Electric Project
- Panniar Hydro Electric Project
- Vellathooval post office
- Co-operative bank
- SBI Vellathooval
- Vellathooval police Station
- Vellathooval Panchyath office
- Krishi Bhavan Vellathooval
- G.H Vellathooval
- Vellathooval Small Hydro Electric Project
