= Neyyassery =

- village
- Location in Kerala, India Neyyassery (India)
- Coordinates: 9°56′2″N 76°46′38″E
- Country: India
- State: Kerala
- District: Idukki
- Elevation: 60 m (200 ft)

Population (2011)
  - Total: 7,557

Languages
  - Official: Malayalam, English
- Time zone: UTC+5:30 (IST)
- PIN: 685581
- Telephone code: 04862
- Vehicle registration: KL-38
- Nearest city: Thodupuzha
- Literacy: 100%
- Lok Sabha constituency: Idukki
- Vidhan Sabha constituency: Thodupuzha
- Website: www.neyyassery.in

Neyyassery is a village in Karimannoor Panchayat in Thodupuzha Taluk of Idukki district in the Indian state of Kerala. Neyyassery's registered population was 7,557 per the 2011 census, compared to the population of 7,610 in 2001; the population of the village decreased in that 10 years. Most of the population is engaged in farming and rubber cultivation fostered by its fertile soil and low-pollution environment. Foreign remittances are one of the main sources of income for people in Neyyassery.

Nearby towns and villages are Kothamangalam, Karimannoor, Thodupuzha, Udumbannoor, Muthalakodam, Vannappuram, Kaliyar, Thommankuthu, Vandamattam, and Kalloorkkad.

== Demographics ==
As of 2011 India census, Neyyassery had a population of 7,557: 3,785 males and 3,772 females.

== See also ==
- Karimannoor
- St. Sebastian's church
- Thodupuzha
