= Anachadikuthu Waterfalls =

Waterfalls in Kerala, India

Anayadikuthu Waterfalls
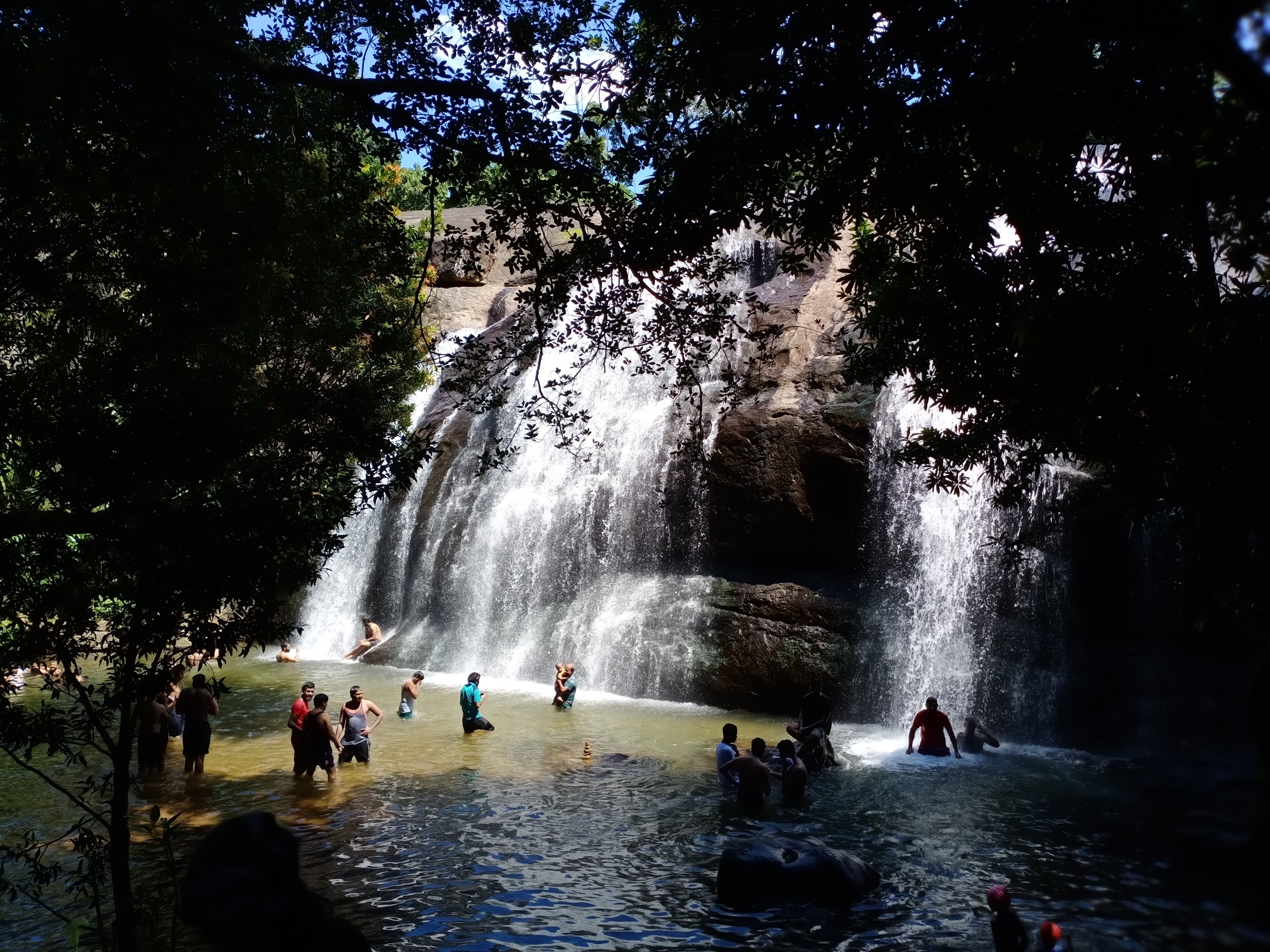
- Interactive map of Anayadikuthu Waterfalls
- Location: Idukki district, Kerala, India
- Coordinates: 9.9641636°N 76.8230914°E
- Elevation: 30 m (98 ft)

Anachadikuth Falls, also known as Anayadikuthu Falls, is located in the Idukki district, Kerala, India, 20 km from Thodopuzha. It is located on the way to the Thommankuth Ecotourism point. During the monsoon, the waterfall rises and flows the maximum. Anayadikuthu is considered as one of the safest waterfalls in the Idukki district, making it a popular family getaway destination. Kattadikkadavu is located near to Anayadikuthu waterfalls.

== Overview ==
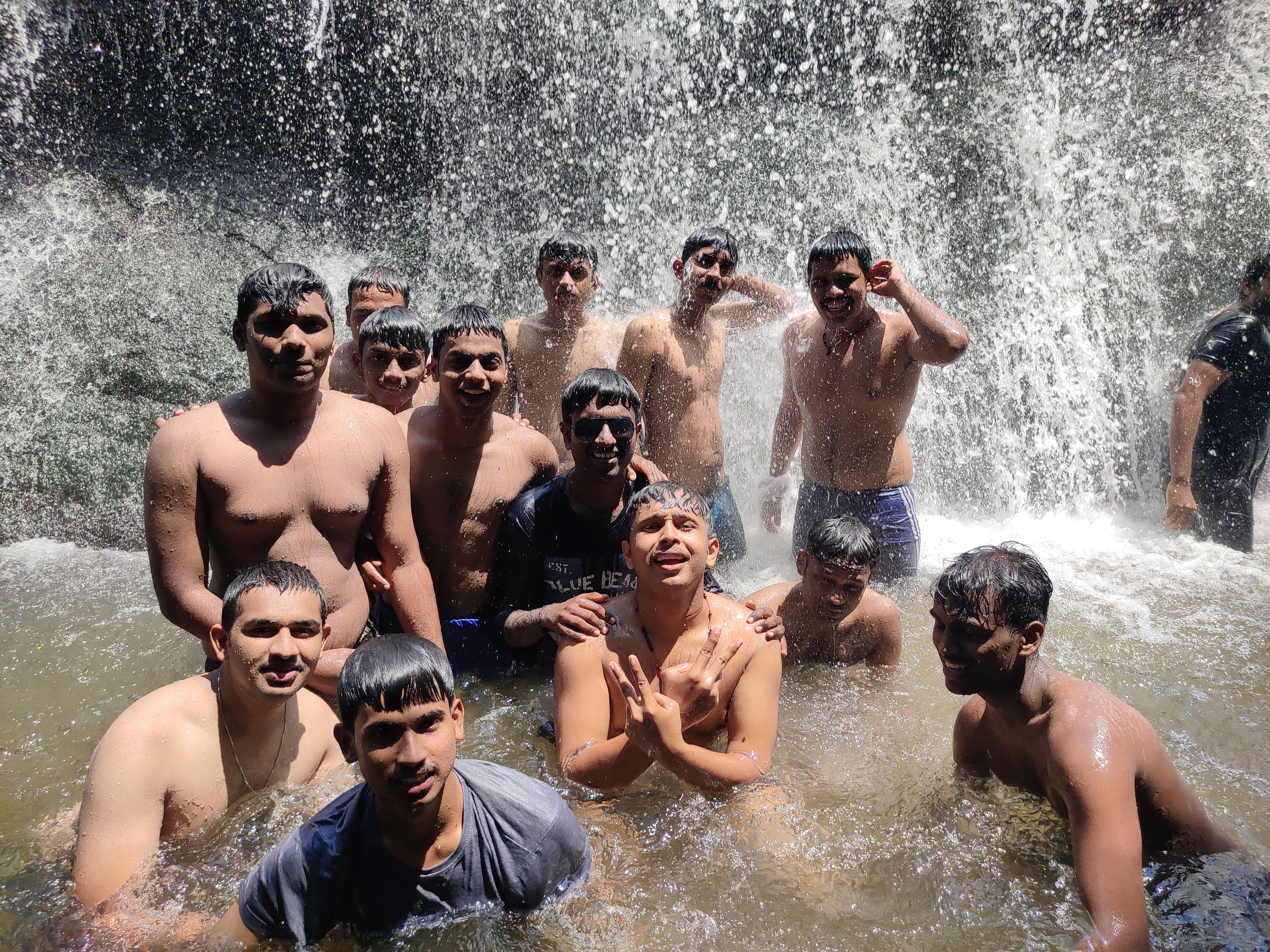
Anayadikuthu waterfall pouring over visitors

Anayadikuthu Waterfalls is located on the border of Karimannur and Vannapuram Panchayats, one kilometer from Thommankuth falls. The ancients say that many years ago, herds of elephants from the inner forests used to reach the flat rock above this waterfall to drink water in summer. Legend has it that the name AnayadiKuthu came from a clash between two elephants and one of them fell into the waterfall and died. The waterfall is located at the bottom of the stream that flows through Kambakakanam and Neikuthanal. There is a concrete bridge for people to walk across the top of the falls. There are monkeys and many types of birds near the waterfall.

== See also ==
- List of waterfalls
- List of waterfalls in India
- Kattadikkadavu
