= Kattadikkadavu =

Hillock in Kerala

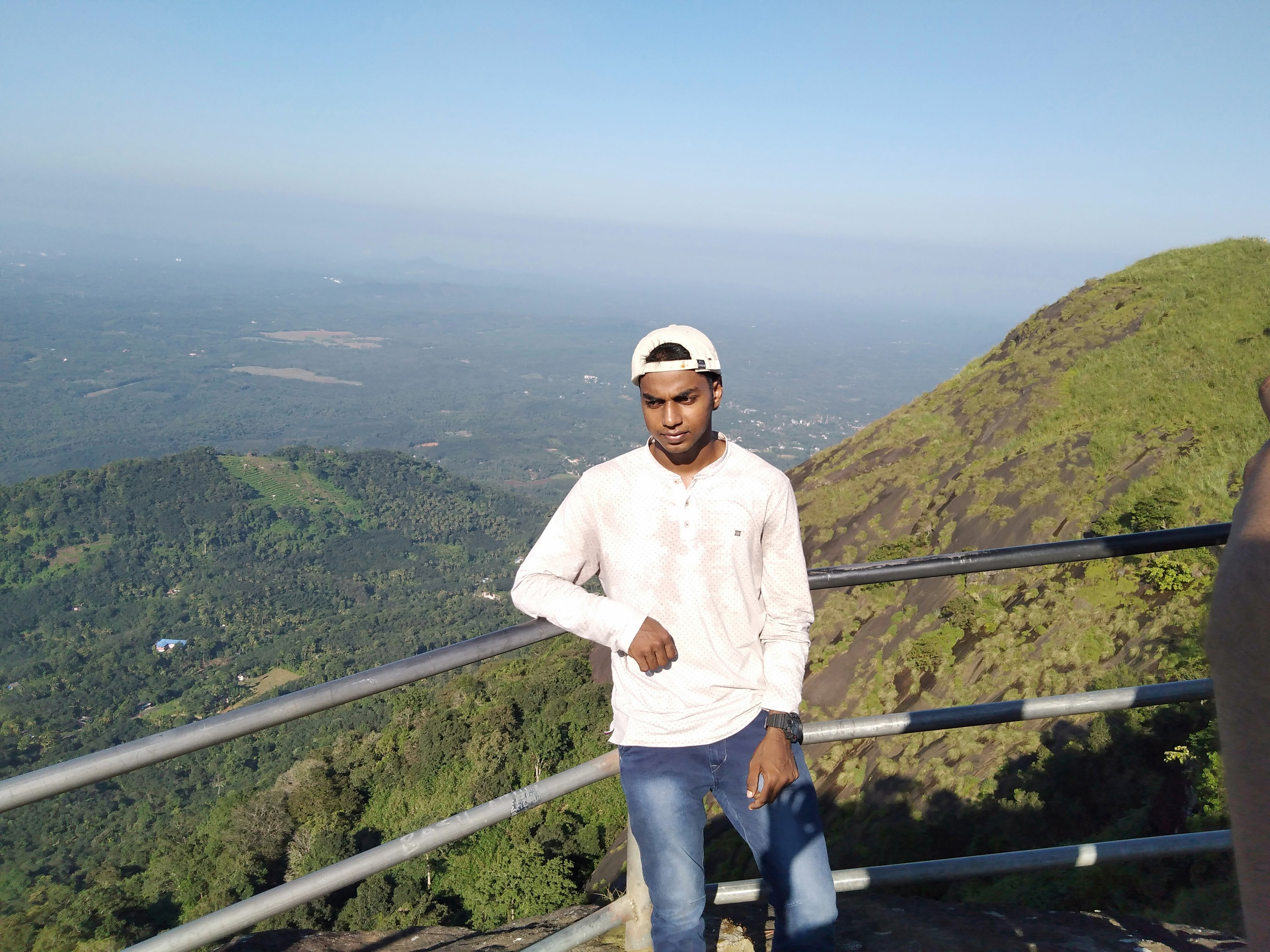
- View point in Kattadikkadavu

Highest point
- Coordinates: 9.9810°N 76.8305°E

Geography
- Location: Vannapuram, Idukki district, Kerala, India

Geology
- Mountain type: hillock

Kattadikkadavu is a hillock and trekking spot located in Vannapuram panchayat near Thodupuzha in Idukki district, Kerala, India. It is also located 34 km from Muvattupuzha in Ernakulam district.

== Overview ==
Katadikkadavu is under the control of Heritage Farm and Hilly Tourism Society under Vannapuram Panchayat. It is located 30 km from Thodupuzha and 2 km from Vannapuram Kallipara Junction. The main attractions here are Muniyara and the ancient scripts inside. Maratakamala is an hillock located 800 m from Kattadikkadavu. A portion of the Bhoothathakettu dam in Ernakulam district can be seen from Kattadikkadavu. Areas of tourist locations such as Ilaveezhapoonchira and Thommankuth can be seen from here. Kottapara Viewpoint and Anachadi Kuth Waterfalls are also located near to Kattadikkadavu.
