= Thodupuzha Block Panchayat =

- Country: India
- State: Kerala
- District Panchayath: Idukki

Government
  - Type: Panchayati raj
  - Body: Block Panchayat Samithi

Languages
  - Official: Malayalam, English, Hindi
- Time zone: UTC+5:30 (IST)

The Thodupuzha Block Panchayat is a local governing body in Kerala, India, operating under the Idukki District Panchayath. It was established in 1995 in accordance with the Kerala Panchayat Raj Act of 1994. Its members are elected by representatives from 13 electoral division. The State Election Commission is responsible for conducting the elections.

== Panchayaths in this jurisdiction ==
- Muttom
- Purappuzha
- Krimkunnam
- Kumaramangalam
- Manakkad
- Edavetty

== 2020-2025 council ==
Elections were conducted on 08 Dec 2020. Counting completed and results were announced on 16 Dec 2020. council.

2020-2025
Division Name	Representative	Party	Notes
Arikkuzha	Jijo Kizhakkichalil	LDF IND	
Edavetty	E. K Ajinas	IND	
Ezhalloor	Neethumol Francis	LDF IND	
Karimkunnam	Treesa Jose	KC(M)_PJJ	
Kumaramangalam	Bindu Shaji	CPI	
Manakkad	A. Jayan	CPI(M)	
Mrala	Laly Joy	INC(I)	
Muttom	N. K. Biju	INC(I)	
Nediyasala	Martin Joseph	INC(I)	
Purappuzha	Annu Augustine	KC(M)_PJJ	
Thekkumbhagam	Suni Sabu	INC(I)	
Thudanganadu	Glory K. A. Paulose	KC(M)_PJJ	
Vazhithala	Joby Mathew	KC(M)_PJJ	

== 2015-2020 council ==
2015-2020
Division Name	Representative	Party	Notes
Arikkuzha	Shini Shaji	IND	
Edavetty	Seena Ismayil Panackal	IND	
Ezhalloor	Sinoj	IND	
Karimkunnam	Satheesh Kesavan	IND	
Kumaramangalam	K V Jose	KC(M)	
Manakkad	Vineetha Anilkumar	IND	
Mrala	Jacob Mathayi (Chacko Kuruttuparambil)	IND	
Muttom	Annamma Cheriyan (Ponni)	INC(I)	
Nediyasala	Leelamma Jose	INC(I)	
Purappuzha	Jimmy Mattathipara	KC(M)	
Thekkumbhagam	Jimmy Paul	IND	
Thudanganadu	Princy	KC(S)	
Vazhithala	Baby Tom Nandalath	KC(M)	

== 2010-2015 council ==
2010-2015
Division Name	Representative	Party	Notes
Arikkuzha	Valsa John	LDF Ind.	
Edavetty	Latheef Muhammed	INC(I)	
Ezhalloor	Leelamma Jose	INC(I)	
Karimkunnam	Shani Benny	KC(M)	
Kumaramangalam	Ameena Sunny	KC(M)	
Manakkad	Sanjayakumar (Saji Madathumchalil)	INC(I)	
Mrala	Bindu Binu	INC(I)	
Muttom	N.K. Biju	INC(I)	
Nediyasala	Joy Augustine	INC(I)	
Purappuzha	Aleykutty Mani	KC(M)	
Thekkumbhagam	Suni Babu	INC(I)	
Thudanganadu	Jose Munjanattu	KC(M)	
Vazhithala	Thankachan M.T.	INC(I)	

== 2005-2010 council ==
2005-2010
Division#	Division Name	Representative	Party	Notes
1	Kumaramangalam	Saly Baby	KC(J)	
2	Ezhalloor	K. N. Roy	INC(I)	
3	Edavetty	Safiya Basheer	Ind.	
4	Thekkumbhagam	C. P. Mathew	DIC(K)	
5	Muttom	K. N. Geethakumari	INC(I)	
6	Pazhayamattam	Kuttiyamma Micheal	KC(J)	
7	Azhakumpara	Gracy Chacko	LDF Ind.	
8	Karimkunnam	Baby Podimattom	KC(J)	
9	Kuninji	Joseph Augustine	KC(J)	
10	Purappuzha	Sreedevi Hari	Ind.	
11	Vazhithala	K. M. Jose	Ind.	
12	Chittoor	Dileepkumar Balakrishnan	Ind.	

== 2000-2005 council ==
2000-2005
Division#	Division Name	Representative	Party	Notes
1	East Kaloor	K. V. Sidharthan	INC(I)	
2	Edavetty	E. S. Moosa	UDF Ind.	
3	Thekkumbhagam	K. N. Geethakumari	INC(I)	
4	Pazhayamattam	Oseppachan Charakkunnathu	KC(J)	
5	Ellichari	Sajamma Shaji	Ind.	
6	Karimkunnam	Shibu Joseph	KC(J)	
7	Kuninji	Jayan Madhavan	CPI(M)	
8	Vazhithala	Reji Kunnamkottu	KC(M)	
9	Manakkad	Rosly Jacob	Ind.	
10	Kumaramangalam	Leelamma Jose	INC(I)	

== See also ==
- 2020 Kerala local body elections
- 2015 Kerala local body elections
- Thodupuzha (Assembly constituency)
- Idukki (Lok Sabha constituency)
- Local government in India
