= St. Mary's Forane Church, Karimannoor =

Catholic church in Karimannoor, India

Religion
- Affiliation: Syro-Malabar Catholic Church
- Province: Syro-Malabar Catholic Diocese of Kothamangalam
- Year consecrated: 1902

Location
- Location: Karimannoor, Thodupuzha
- Interactive map of St. Mary's Forane Church, Karimannoor

Architecture
- Direction of façade: West

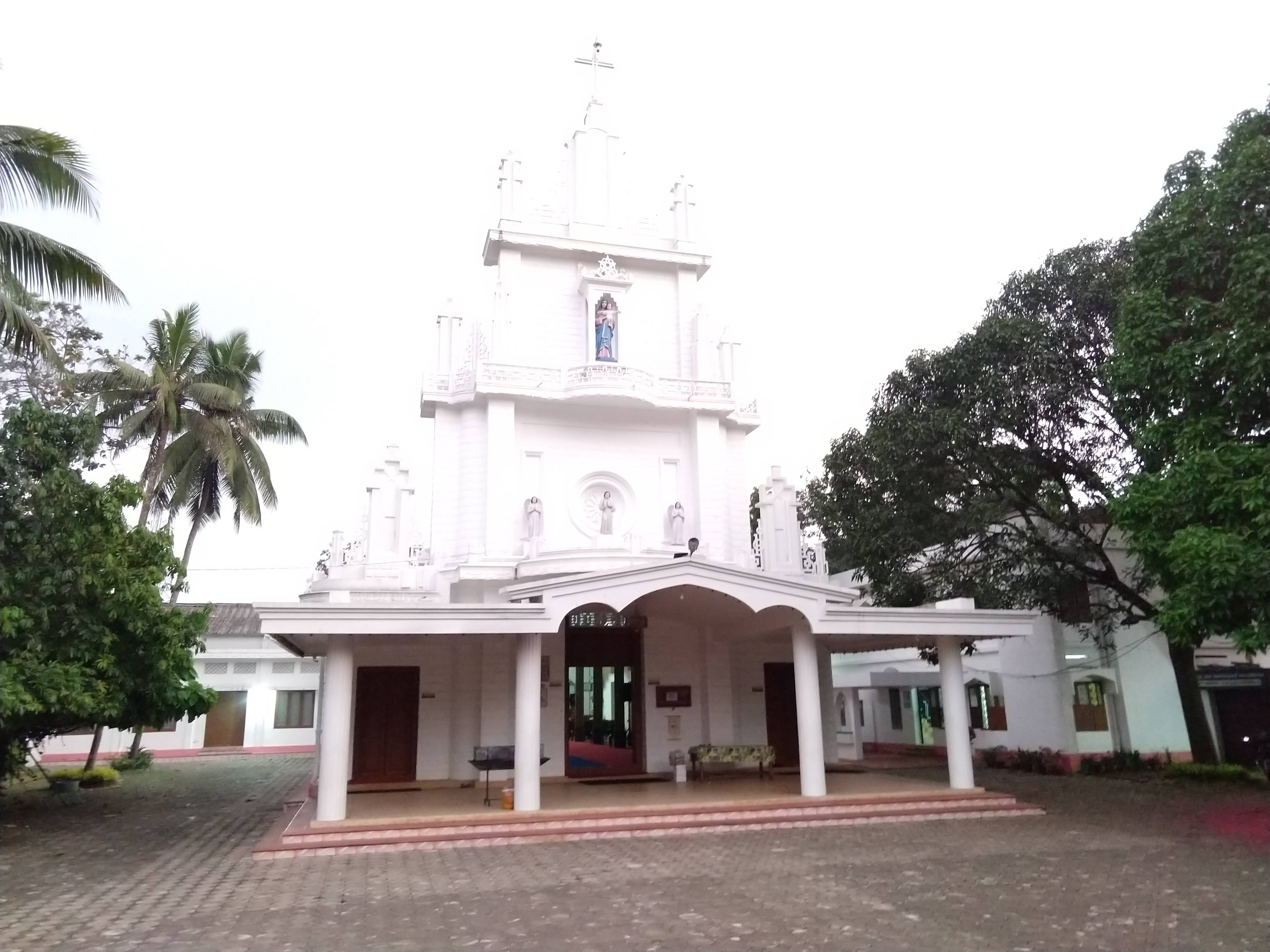
St Mary's Church Karimannoor

St. Mary's Forane Church (Marth Mariam Forane Church) is a Syro-Malabar Catholic church in Karimannoor panchayath, 10 km away from Thodupuzha, in the Eparchy of Kothamangalam. St. Mary's Forane Church claims to date to 105 AD and to be the site of the first Marian apparition in world history, with the appearance of the Virgin Mary to three young boys at a spring in 335 AD.
