= Idukki District Council =

Idukki District Panchayat
- Country: India
- State: Kerala

Government
  - Type: Panchayati raj
  - Body: District council
  - President: Sheela Stephen (Kerala Congress)
  - Vice President: T.S. Siddique
  - Dist. Panchayat Secretary: -

Languages
  - Official: Malayalam, English, Hindi
- Time zone: UTC+5:30 (IST)
- Website: https://idukkidp.lsgkerala.gov.in/en/

The District Councils are the territory level of local government under Panchayati Raj act in India. Idukki District Council is in Kerala state in India. It was established in 1995 in accordance with Kerala Panchayati Raj Act 1994. The District Council is functioning as a local governing body at district level. Its members are elected by people from each electoral division. The electoral college]] is based on the universal suffrage. The Idukki District Council has jurisdiction over Idukki District, except for the municipal towns of Kalpatta and Thodupuzha. The State Election Commission is responsible for conducting these elections.

The incumbent President of Idukki District Panchayat is Sheela Stephen.

== Block councils in jurisdiction ==
- Adimali
- Azhutha
- Devikulam
- Elamdesham
- Idukki
- Kattapana
- Nedumkandam
- Thodupuzha

== Politics ==
Party	Abbreviation	Symbol
Indian National Congress	INC(I)	
Communist Party of India (Marxist)	CPI(M)	Hammer, Sickle and Star
Bharatiya Janata Party	BJP	Lotus
Communist Party of India	CPI	Ears of Rice and Sickle
Kerala Congress (M) Jose K. Mani Faction	KC(M)	Two Leaves
Indian Union Muslim League	IUML	Ladder
Kerala Congress (M) P. J. Joseph Faction	KC(M)_PJJ	Chenda
Janadhipathya Kerala Congress	KC(D)	Scooter
Kerala Congress (Joseph)	KC(J)	
Kerala Congress (Secular)	KC(S)	
Independent Supported by UDF	UDF Ind.	Various (Umbrella etc.)
Independent Supported by LDF	LDF Ind.	Various (Umbrella etc.)
Independent Supported by NDA	NDA Ind.	Various (Umbrella etc.)
Independent	Ind.	Various (Umbrella, apple etc.)

== 2020-2025 Council ==
2015-2020
Division Name	Representative	Party	Notes
Adimali	Soly Jesus	INC(I)	
Devikulam	C. Rajendran	CPI(M)	
Karimannoor	Indu Sudhakaran	INC(I)	
Karimkunnam	C. V. Sunitha	KC(M)_PJJ	
Moolamattam	M. J. Jacob	KC(M)_PJJ	
Mullaringadu	Shainy Reji	KC(M)_PJJ	
Munnar	Bhavya	CPI	
Nedumkandom	V N Mohanan	CPI (M)	
Painavu	K. G. Sathyan	CPI(M)	
Pambadumpara	Jiji K. Philip	CPI	
Rajakkad	Ushakumari Mohankumar	CPI (M)	
Thopramkudy	Shainy Saji	KC(M)_PJJ	
Upputhara	Asha Antony	CPI	
Vagamon	K. T. Binu	CPI(M)	
Vandanmedu	Joseph Kurivila	KC(M)	
Vandiperiyar	S. P. Rajendran	CPI	

== 2015-2020 Council ==
2015-2020
Division Name	Representative	Party	Notes
Adimali	Infant Thomas	INC(I)	
Devikulam	Baby Sakthivel	CPI(M)	
Karimannoor	Manojkumar N.T (Manoj Thankappan)	INC(I)	
Karimkunnam	Mathew John ( Thampi Manunkal)	KC(M)	
Moolamattam	Sunitha C.V	KC(M)	
Mullaringadu	Vishnu K.Chandran	CPI(M)	
Munnar	S.Vijayakumar	INC(I)	
Murickassery	Noble Jose (Noble Joseph)	IND	
Nedumkandom	Nirmala Nandakumar	CPI(M)	
Painavu	Lisamma Sajan	IND	
Pampadumpara	Molly Michael	INC(I)	
Rajakkad	Kochuthresia Paulose	INC(I)	
Upputhara	Syriac Thomas	INC(I)	
Vagamon	Molly Dominic	CPI	
Vandanmedu	Kunjumol Chacko	INC(I)	
Vandiperiyar	Vijayakumari Udayasooryan	INC(I)	

== 2010-2015 Council ==
2010-2015
Division Name	Representative	Party	Notes
Adimaly	Mercy Joy	INC(I)	
Devikulam	D. Kumar	INC(I)	
Karimannoor	Indu Sudhakaran	INC(I)	
Karimkunnam	Sheela Stephen	KC(M)	
Kattapana	Mary Antony	KC(M)	
Moolamattom	Alex Kozhimala	KC(M)	
Munnar	Suseela	INC(I)	
Murikkasery	Shiny Saji	KC(M)	
Nedumkandam	K.N. Murali	KC(M)	
Painav	Georgy George	INC(I)	
Pambadumpara	K.T. Michael	INC(I)	
Peerumade	Jancy Shaji	INC(I)	
Rajakkad	Kochuthressia Poulose	INC(I)	
Vagamon	M.T. Thomas	INC(I)	
Vandanmade	M.M. Varghese	INC(I)	
Vandiperiyar	Suresh Babu	INC(I)	

== 2005-2010 Council ==
2005-2010
Division#	Division Name	Representative	Party	Notes
1	Adimaly	P. R. Sukumaran	INC(I)	
2	Munnar	P. Palanivel	CPI	
3	Devikulam	Tessy Francis	CPI(M)	
4	Rajakkad	O. G. Madhanan	CPI(M)	
5	Murikkasery	Noble Joseph	KC(J)	
6	Nedumkandam	Latha Rajaji	CPI(M)	
7	Pambadumpara	Jameela Raghavan	CPI	
8	Kattapana	Joy Vettikuzhy	KC(J)	
9	Kumaly	Ambika K. V.	CPI(M)	
10	Valadi	Vazhoor Soman	CPI	
11	Vagamon	E. S. Bijimol	CPI	
12	Peerumade	Antappan Jacob	CPI(M)	
13	Arakkulam	Sheela Stephan		
14	Karimkunnam	K. N. Murali	DIC(K)	
15	Karimannoor	Roy K. Poulose	INC(I)	
16	Painav	Shajini	CPI(M)	

== 2000-2005 Council ==
2000-2005
Division#	Division Name	Representative	Party	Notes
1	Adimaly	Annakutty Yackob	INC(I)	
2	Munnar	P. Palanivel	CPI	
3	Devikulam	S. Rajendran	CPI(M)	
4	Rajakumari	O. G. Madhanan	CPI(M)	
5	Murikkasery	Mary Augusthy	UDF	
6	Kattapana	M. C. Thomas	KC(M)	
7	Nedumkandam	Sini Gopinath	CPI	
8	Vandanmade	S Njansundaran	INC(I)	
9	Kumaly	Merina John	Ind.	
10	Peerumade	Antappan Jacob	CPI(M)	
11	Elappara	M. T. Thomas	INC(I)	
12	Arakkulam	Sam George	KC(J)	
13	Karimkunnam	Joseph Augustine	KC(J)	
14	Karimannoor	Sarojini Chandran	INC(I)	
15	Vazhathoppu	K. N. Murali	UDF	

== See also ==
- 2020 Kerala local body elections
- 2015 Kerala local body elections
- Devikulam (State Assembly constituency)
- Idukki (State Assembly constituency)
- Peerumade (State Assembly constituency)
- Thodupuzha (Assembly constituency)
- Udumbanchola (State Assembly constituency)
- Idukki (Lok Sabha constituency)
- Local government in India
