= Thenathoor =

Thennathoor
- village
- Country: India
- State: Kerala
- District: Idukki

Population
  - Total: 5,000

Languages
  - Official: Malayalam, English
- Time zone: UTC+5:30 (IST)
- Vehicle registration: KL-38

Thennathoor is a small village, population of 5000, located 16 kilometres (9.9 mi) from Thodupuzha, Kerala, India. Thodupuzha is the taluk headquarters of Thodupuzha taluk, one among the four taluks in Idukki District of Kerala.

== Geography ==
It is bordered by the Kaliyar river, flowing past Thennathoor, Kaloor and onto Muvattupuzha. The vast expanse of the Malayalam Plantations (approx. 10,000 acres (4,000 ha)) belonging to the RPGoenka group, into rubber and pineapple, lies on its eastern periphery.

Thennathoor has its Village Office and Panchayath Office at East Kodikulam, 6 km (3.7 mi) away. Thennathoor is 2 km (1.2 mi) from Njarakad, 8 km (5.0 mi) from Vannappuram, 10 km (6.2 mi) from Kaliyar, 3 km (1.9 mi) from Parapuzha, 5 km (3.1 mi) from West Kodikulam and 19 km (12 mi) from Kaloorkad. It is also located close to Thomankuth, a famous tourist attraction. Njarakad, lying across the river on the newly built road bridge (circa 2002), is on the Kaliyar-Muvattupuzha Road.

== Economy ==
The residents are chiefly farmers with average holdings of 5 acres (20,000 m^{2}) of Rubber. Paddy cultivation is on the decline, with but 10 families still holding out. The nearest industry is the Thomson Granites, near Parapuzha.

== Facilities ==
It boasts of the Fathima Church, primary school, both at Thennathoor, temple at West Kodikulam.
