= St. Sebastian's Church, Neyyassery =

St. Sebastian's Church
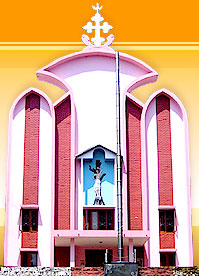
- Location: Neyyassery, Idukki, Kerala, India
- Denomination: Syrian Catholic

History
- Status: Parish church
- Dedication: Saint Sebastian
- Consecrated: 1852

Administration
- District: Idukki

St. Sebastian's Church is the centre of worship of Christianity in Neyyassery. Neyyassery is a village in Kerala. The church is located in a beautiful location at the heart of this village. The church is located at 11 km away from Thodupuzha which is in Idukki district. It was established in 1852 and was rebuilt in 1987. First stone laid for the new church on the feast day of the Archangel Michael. The parish celebrates the Archangel Michael's feast and Saint Sebastian's feasts every year with a lot of enthusiasm. This church is part of the Syro Malabar Church, India. The patron of the church is St.Sebastian.

== Major celebrations ==
=== Feast day of Saint Sebastian ===
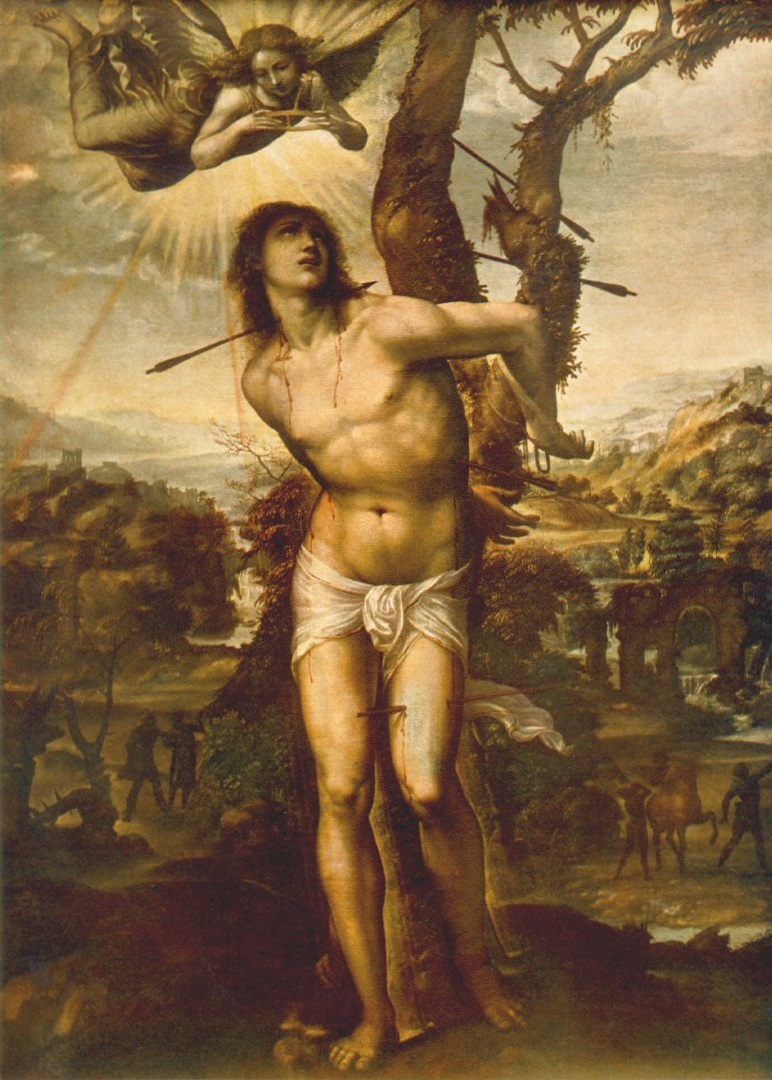
Saint Sebastian

This is the major celebration in this church. St.Sebastian is the patron of the church.

=== Feast day of Angel Michael ===
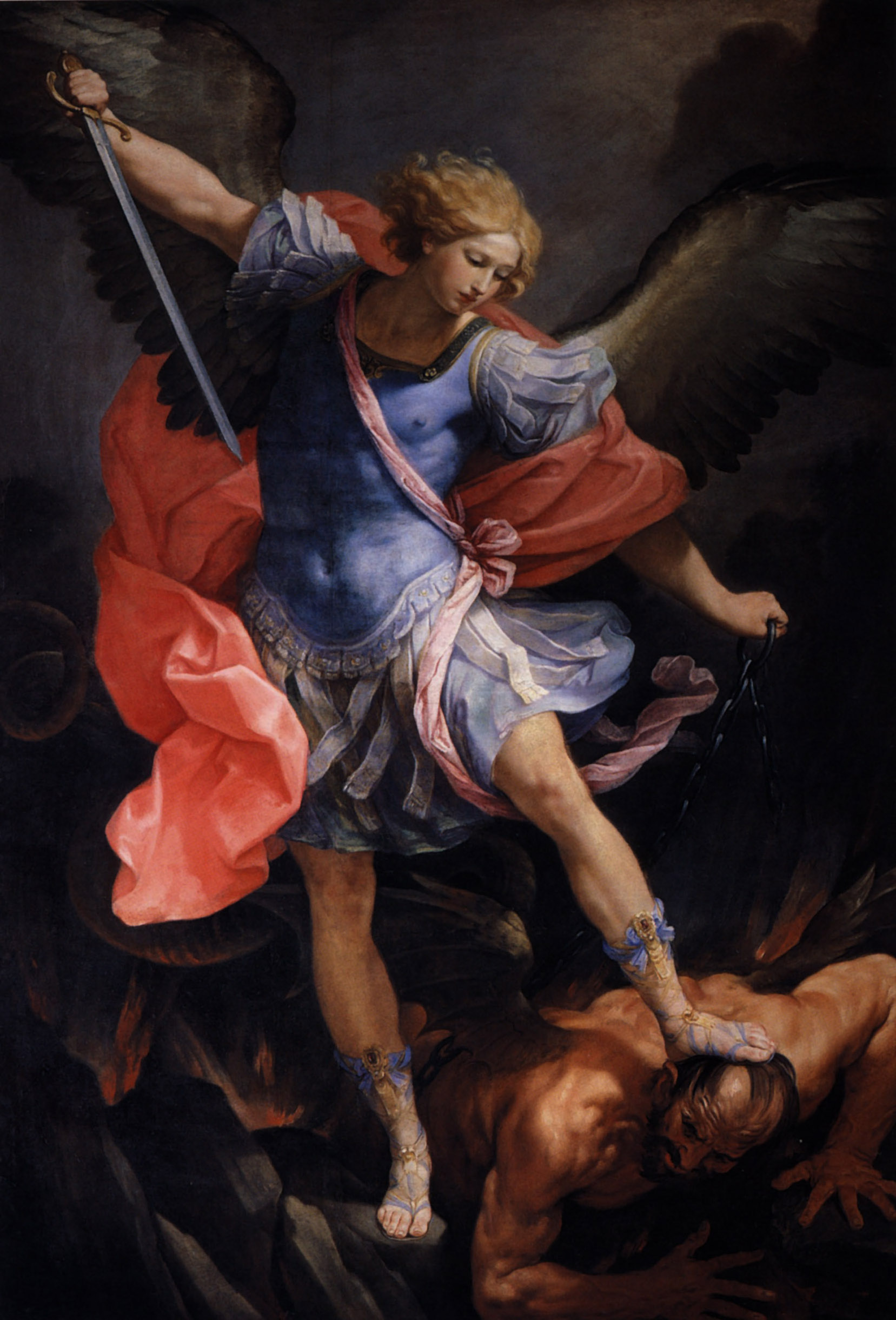
Michael Angel

Foundation stone of the church was laid on the feast day of Angel Michael. So thereafter that day is celebrated with all enthusiasm. Normally the feast is celebrated for two days.

== Brief chronology ==
- Foundation stone laid in the year 1852
- New church was completed in the year 1992

== Holy mass timing ==
- 6.00 AM and 6.45AM on weekdays except Tuesdays
- On Sundays the timings are 06:00 AM,7:30 AM and 09:45 AM.

== Special amenities ==
=== Proposed parish hall ===
The General body of the church has decided to construct a new parish hall with A/c provision costing one crore in the nearby ground. The speciality of the hall will be

- The first and only A/c parish hall in Thodupuzha Thaluk
- With ample parking facility – 250 to 300 Cars at a time
- With 700 seating facility and 10,000 sq. feet area.

Contributions from the parishioners and the NRIs are the main source for fund besides its own fund. All are welcomed to contribute liberally for the ambitious project. Those working abroad and erstwhile parishioners are requested to sponsor liberally for the early completion of the project. Those willing to contribute are requested to contact Rev Fr Vicar St: Sebastian's Church Neyyassery.

== See also ==
- Christianity in India
- Syrian Malabar Nasrani
- Michael (archangel)
- Saint Sebastian
