= Thodupuzha Assembly constituency =

Kerala Legislative Assembly Constituency in Kerala, India

Thodupuzha
- Constituency No. 90 for the Kerala Legislative Assembly
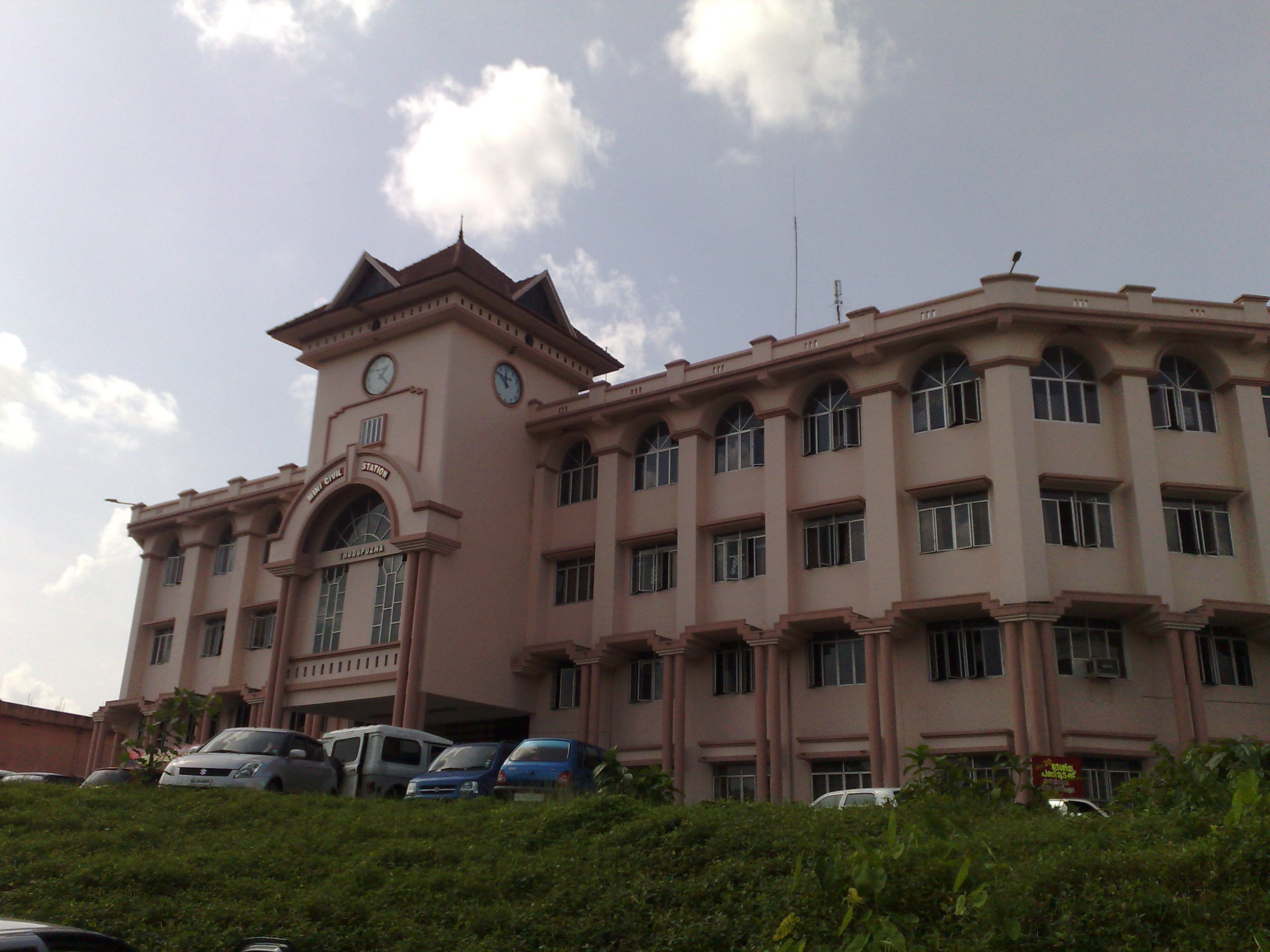
- Thodupuzha Civil Station

Constituency details
- Country: India
- Region: South India
- State: Kerala
- District: Idukki
- Established: 1957
- Total electors: 1,95,987 (2016)
- Reservation: None

Member of Legislative Assembly
- 16th Kerala Legislative Assembly
- Incumbent Apu John Joseph
- Party: KEC
- Elected year: 2026

Thodupuzha State assembly constituency is one of the 140 state legislative assembly constituencies in Kerala in southern India. It is also one of the seven state legislative assembly constituencies included in Idukki Lok Sabha constituency.The current MLA of Thodupuzha is Apu John Joseph of Kerala Congress,who is currently serving as the Chief Whip in the government of Kerala.

== Local self-governed segments ==
Thodupuzha Assembly constituency is composed of the following local self-governed segments:

Sl no.	Name	Status (Grama panchayat/Municipality)	Taluk
1	Thodupuzha	Municipality	Thodupuzha
2	Edavetty	Grama panchayat	Thodupuzha
3	Karimannoor	Grama panchayat	Thodupuzha
4	Karimkunnam	Grama panchayat	Thodupuzha
5	Kodikulam	Grama panchayat	Thodupuzha
6	Kumaramangalam	Grama panchayat	Thodupuzha
7	Manakkad	Grama panchayat	Thodupuzha
8	Muttom	Grama panchayat	Thodupuzha
9	Purapuzha	Grama panchayat	Thodupuzha
10	Udumbannoor	Grama panchayat	Thodupuzha
11	Vannappuram	Grama panchayat	Thodupuzha
12	Velliyamattom	Grama panchayat	Thodupuzha
13	Alacode	Grama panchayat	Thodupuzha and Idukki

== Members of the Legislative Assembly ==
The following list contains all members of Kerala Legislative Assembly who have represented the constituency:

Key

INC Independent KC(M) KC(J)

Election	Name	Party
1957	C. A. Mathew	Indian National Congress
1960	C. A. Mathew	Indian National Congress
1967	K. C. Zacharia	Independent
1970	P. J. Joseph	Kerala Congress
1977	P. J. Joseph	Kerala Congress
1980	P. J. Joseph	Kerala Congress (Joseph)
1982	P. J. Joseph	Kerala Congress (Joseph)
1987	P. J. Joseph	Kerala Congress (Joseph)
1991	P. T. Thomas	Indian National Congress
1996	P. J. Joseph	Kerala Congress (Joseph)
2001	P. T. Thomas	Indian National Congress
2006	P. J. Joseph	Kerala Congress (Joseph)
2011	P. J. Joseph	Kerala Congress (M)
2016	P. J. Joseph	Kerala Congress (M)
2021	P. J. Joseph	Kerala Congress
2026	Apu John Joseph	Kerala Congress

== Election results ==
Percentage change (±%) denotes the change in the number of votes from the immediately previous election.

=== 2026 ===
2026 Kerala Legislative Assembly election: Thodupuzha
Party	Candidate	Votes	%	±%
KEC	Apu John Joseph	84,796	58.01	▲9.38
KC(M)	Cyriac Chazhikadan	40,505	27.71	▼6.32
TTP	Roy A. Varikkad	12,679	8.67	−
AAP	Adv. Basil John	2,603	1.78	New
Independent	Ajay V Marar (Ajay Unni)	2,580	1.77	−
SDPI	Afsal M B	1,626	1.11	−
NOTA	None of the above	876	0.6	
Independent	Jomon John	267	0.18	−
SUCI(C)	P T Varghese	234	0.16	▼0.04
Margin of victory		44,291		
Turnout		1,46,166		
KEC hold		Swing		

=== 2021 ===
There were 201,210 registered voters in Thodupuzha Constituency for the 2021 Kerala Assembly election.

2021 Kerala Legislative Assembly election: Thodupuzha
Party	Candidate	Votes	%	±%
KEC	P. J. Joseph	67,495	48.63	–
KC(M)	Prof. K. I. Antony	47,236	34.03	▼20.05
BJP	Shyamraj P.	21,263	15.32	–
BSP	Leethesh P. T.	934	0.67	▲0.36
NOTA	None of the above	674	0.49	▼0.37
Independent	M. T. Thomas	562	0.40	–
Independent	Parthasaradhi K.	370	0.27	–
SUCI(C)	T. R. Sreedharan	273	0.20	▼0.37
Margin of victory		20,259	14.60	▼17.60
Turnout		138,807	72.59	▲0.35
KEC gain from KC(M)		Swing		

=== 2016 ===
There were 1,95,987 registered voters in the constituency for the 2016 Kerala Assembly election.

2016 Kerala Legislative Assembly election: Thodupuzha
Party	Candidate	Votes	%	±%
KC(M)	P. J. Joseph	76,177	54.08	▲2.16
LDF	Roy Varicattu	30,977	21.08	
BDJS	S. Praveen	28,845	20.37	
SDPI	Roy Arackal	1,294	0.91	▼3.31
NOTA	None of the above	1,219	0.86	−
SUCI(C)	Nisha Jimmy	811	0.57	▲0.38
PDP	Najeeb Kalarickal	710	0.50	−
BSP	P. J. Ambily	440	0.31	▲0.15
Independent	Santhosh P. K.	292	0.21	−
Independent	K. M. Veenas	228	0.16	−
Independent	Pareeth	194	0.14	−
Margin of victory		45,587	32.20	▲1.12
Turnout		1,41,574	72.24	▲0.29
KC(M) hold		Swing	▲2.16	

=== 2011 ===
There were 1,77,529 registered voters in the constituency for the 2011 election.

2011 Kerala Legislative Assembly election: Thodupuzha
Party	Candidate	Votes	%	±%
KC(M)	P. J. Joseph	66,325	51.92	
Independent	Joseph Augustine	43,457	34.02	
BJP	P. M. Velayudhan	10,049	7.87	
SDPI	M. A. Najeeb	5,386	4.22	
BSP	Binu Sebastian	677	0.53	−
Independent	C. R. Dileep Kumar	655	0.51	−
Independent	T. S. Sreenivasan	482	0.38	−
Independent	Joman John	282	0.22	−
SUCI(C)	Siby C. Mathew	246	0.19	
KJ	Shibu Mon	179	0.14	−
Margin of victory		22,868	17.90	
Turnout		1,27,738	71.95	
KC(M) hold		Swing		

== See also ==
- Thodupuzha
- Idukki district
- List of constituencies of the Kerala Legislative Assembly
- 2016 Kerala Legislative Assembly election
