= Apu John Joseph =

Indian politician and Kerala MLA (born 1973)

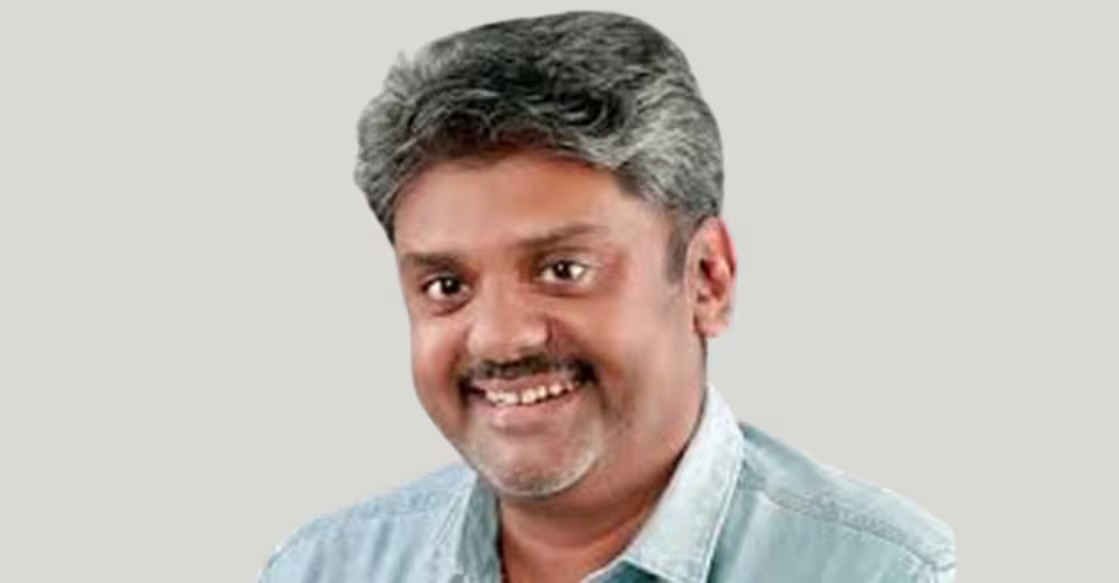

Chief Whip of the Kerala Legislative Assembly
- Incumbent
- Assumed office 18 May 2026
- Preceded by: N. Jayaraj

Member of the Kerala Legislative Assembly
- Incumbent
- Assumed office 21 May 2026
- Preceded by: P. J. Joseph
- Constituency: Thodupuzha

Personal details
- Born: 12 September 1972 (age 54) Purapuzha, Thodupuzha, Idukki district, Kerala, India
- Party: Kerala Congress
- Parents: P. J. Joseph; Dr. Santha Joseph
- Education: Bachelor of Engineering
- Alma mater: Kumaraguru College of Technology, Coimbatore
- Occupation: Politician; Entrepreneur; Agriculturist

Apu John Joseph (born 12 Sep 1972) is an Indian politician, entrepreneur, and social worker who is currently serving as the Chief Whip in the Government of Kerala with Cabinet rank. He is a member of the Kerala Legislative Assembly, representing the Thodupuzha constituency since May 2026. He belongs to the Kerala Congress party and is the son of veteran political leader P. J. Joseph.

== Early life and education ==
Apu John Joseph was born on 12 Sep 1972 in Purapuzha, Thodupuzha, Kerala, to the veteran Kerala Congress leader and former minister P. J. Joseph and Dr. Santha Joseph.

He pursued his technical education in Tamil Nadu, graduating with a Bachelor of Engineering (B.E.) degree in Electronics and Communication Engineering from Kumaraguru College of Technology, Coimbatore (affiliated with Bharathiar University) in 1995. Prior to entering mainstream politics, he was engaged as an agriculturist and an entrepreneur managing regional business initiatives.

== Political career ==
Joseph entered public service through the organizational wings of the Kerala Congress. He served as the state coordinator for the party before making his electoral debut.

In the 2026 Kerala Legislative Assembly election, he was selected to contest from the party stronghold of Thodupuzha, succeeding his father who had represented the seat ten times since 1970. Joseph won the election by a decisive margin of 44,291 votes, securing 84,796 votes (58.01% of the total poll share) defeating his nearest rival, Cyriac Chazhikadan of the Kerala Congress (M).

Following the landslide victory of the United Democratic Front (UDF) in the 2026 elections, he was designated as the Chief whip in the government of Kerala under the V. D. Satheesan-led ministry as part of the coalition agreement.
