= Njandirukky Waterfalls =

Waterfalls in Kerala, India

- Interactive map of Njandirukky Waterfalls
- Location: Idukki district, Kerala, India
- Coordinates: 9.8429°N 76.8552°E

Njandirukky Falls is located in the Idukki district, Kerala, India. The waterfall is within walking distance of Poomala, 19 km from Thodupuzha. It is mainly visited as a stopover destination by tourists, while visiting the Moolamattam Powerhouse and Thommankuth Falls in Idukki.
