= Amaramkavu =

Hindu temple in Idukki district, Kerala

Amaramkavu Devi Temple
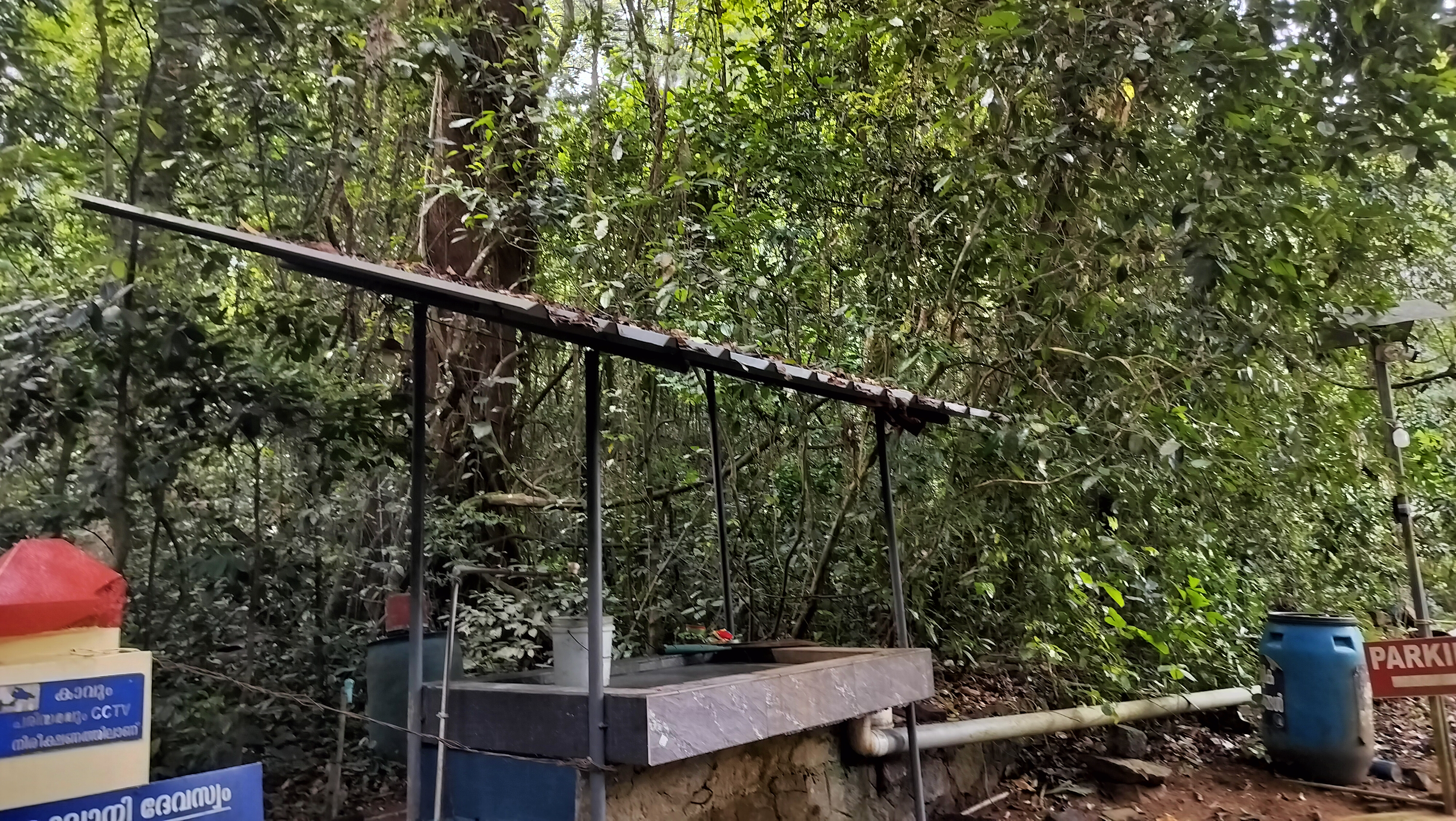
- Amaramkavu Devi Temple.

- Kolani, Thodupuzha, Idukki, Kerala

Religion
- Affiliation: Hinduism
- District: Idukki
- Deity: Vanadurga

Location
- Location: Kolani, Thodupuzha
- State: Kerala
- Country: India
- Coordinates: 9°53′26.9″N 76°41′25.5″E

Specifications
- Temple: One
- Elevation: 82.03 m (269 ft)

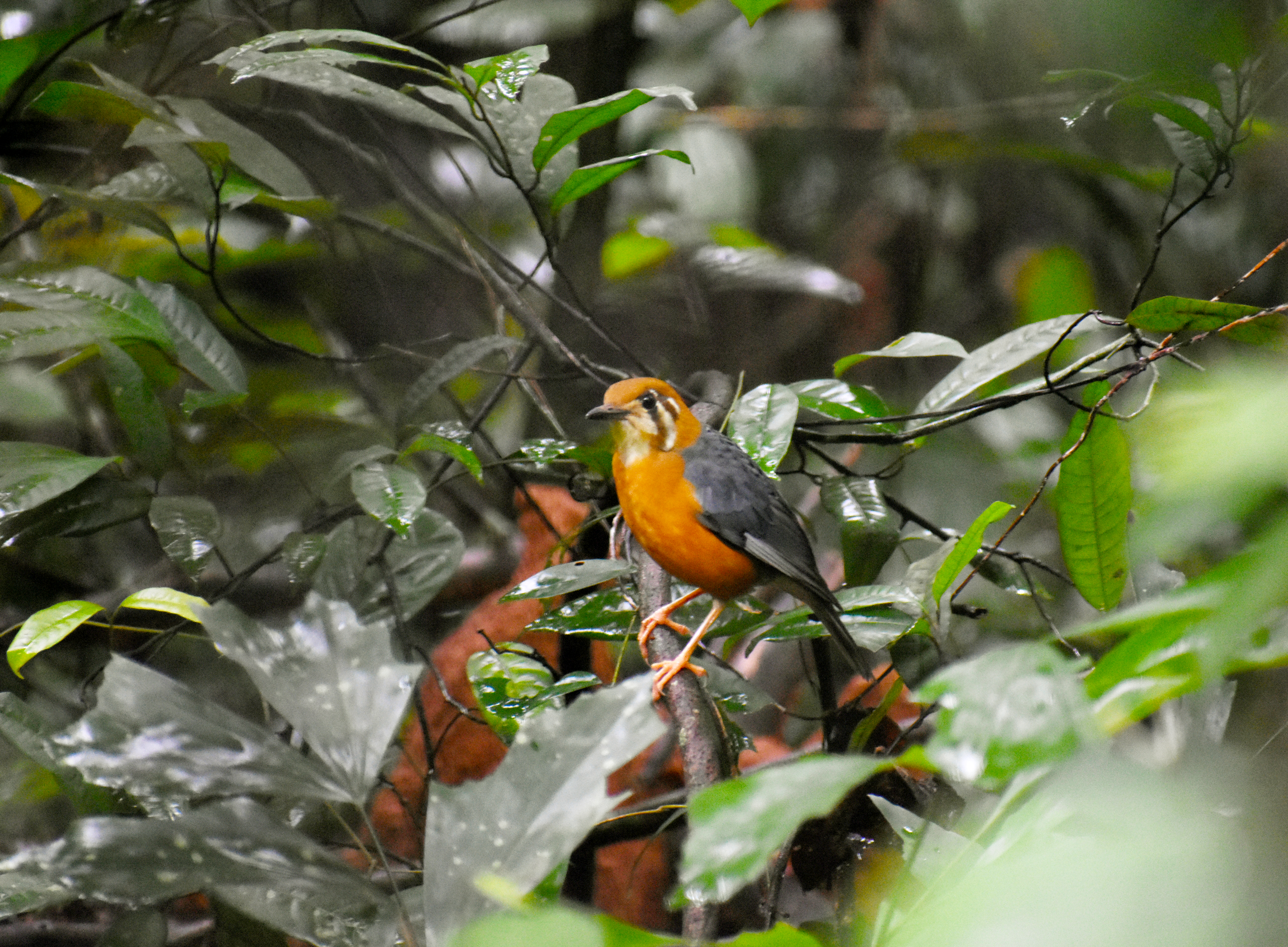
White-throated Ground Thrush, photographed from Amaramkavu

Amaramkavu is a sacred grove and Hindu temple dedicated to Goddess VanaDurga, situated in Kolani, Thodupuzha Municipality, Idukki district, Kerala. Amaramkavu is the largest sacred grove in the Idukki district. Amaramkavu has an area near to 3 acres and is rich in biodiversity.
