= Kusumom Joseph =

Indian politician

Member of the Kerala Legislative Assembly
- Constituency: Karikkode constituency

Personal details
- Born: 13 April 1926
- Died: 14 December 1991 (aged 65)

Kusumom Joseph (13 April 1926 – 14 December 1991) was an Indian politician. She represented Karikkode constituency in the first and second Kerala legislative assemblies. Kusumom entered in politics in 1948 through Indian National Congress. In 1952 she became the vice president of Congress Women's Wing, Muvattupuzha. She was also the state women's front Vice-President.
