= Chazhikattu Hospital =

Chazhikattu hospital
- Chazhikattu Hospital Trust

Geography
- Location: Thodupuzha, Idukki, Kerala, India

Organisation
- Care system: Private
- Type: General

Services
- Emergency department: Yes
- Beds: 150

History
- Founded: 1933; 93 years ago

Links
- Lists: Hospitals in India

Baby Memorial Hospital (Earlier Known as Chazhikattu Hospital) is a multi-speciality hospital in Thodupuzha, Idukki district in Kerala, India. It was established in 1933 under the Chazhikattu Hospital Trust.

This hospital is known for critical accident care and orthopaedic surgical treatments.

This hospital is listed as one of the institution under the 'Disaster Management Directory – 2009' published by the Government of Kerala.

== Departments ==
The hospital runs all major medical and surgical services, as well as outpatient facilities and a 24-hour Accident and Emergency department.
