= Karikkode Bhagavathy Temple =

Hindu temple in Kerala, India

- Bhagavathy Temple, Karikkode, Thodupuzha, Idukki, Kerala

Religion
- Affiliation: Hinduism
- District: Idukki

Location
- Location: Karikkode, Thodupuzha
- State: Kerala
- Country: India
- Interactive map of Karikkode Bhagavathy Temple
- Coordinates: 9°53′59.2″N 76°43′40.6″E

Architecture
- Type: Architecture of Kerala

Specifications
- Temple: One
- Elevation: 51.15 m (168 ft)

Karikkode Bhagavathy Temple (Malayalam: കാരിക്കോട് ഭഗവതി ക്ഷേത്രം) is a Hindu temple located in the village of Karikkode near Thodupuzha in Idukki district in the Indian state of Kerala. The structure is believed to be 460 years old.

== Temple ==
Goddess Bhadrakali/Bhagavathy presides there. The idol installed there is a 'Shilakkannadi' one, which faces west. Three poojas are held daily, abided by Kaviyadu thanthra. Other subordinate deities are Shiva and Ganapathi. The annual festival is hosted in the Malayalam month of 'Kumbham' during the Ashwathy and Bharani days.

== History ==
Vadakkumkoor raja underwent a long penance and prayers and brought Kodungallor Bhagavathy to the temple.
