= P. J. Joseph =

Indian politician (born 1941)

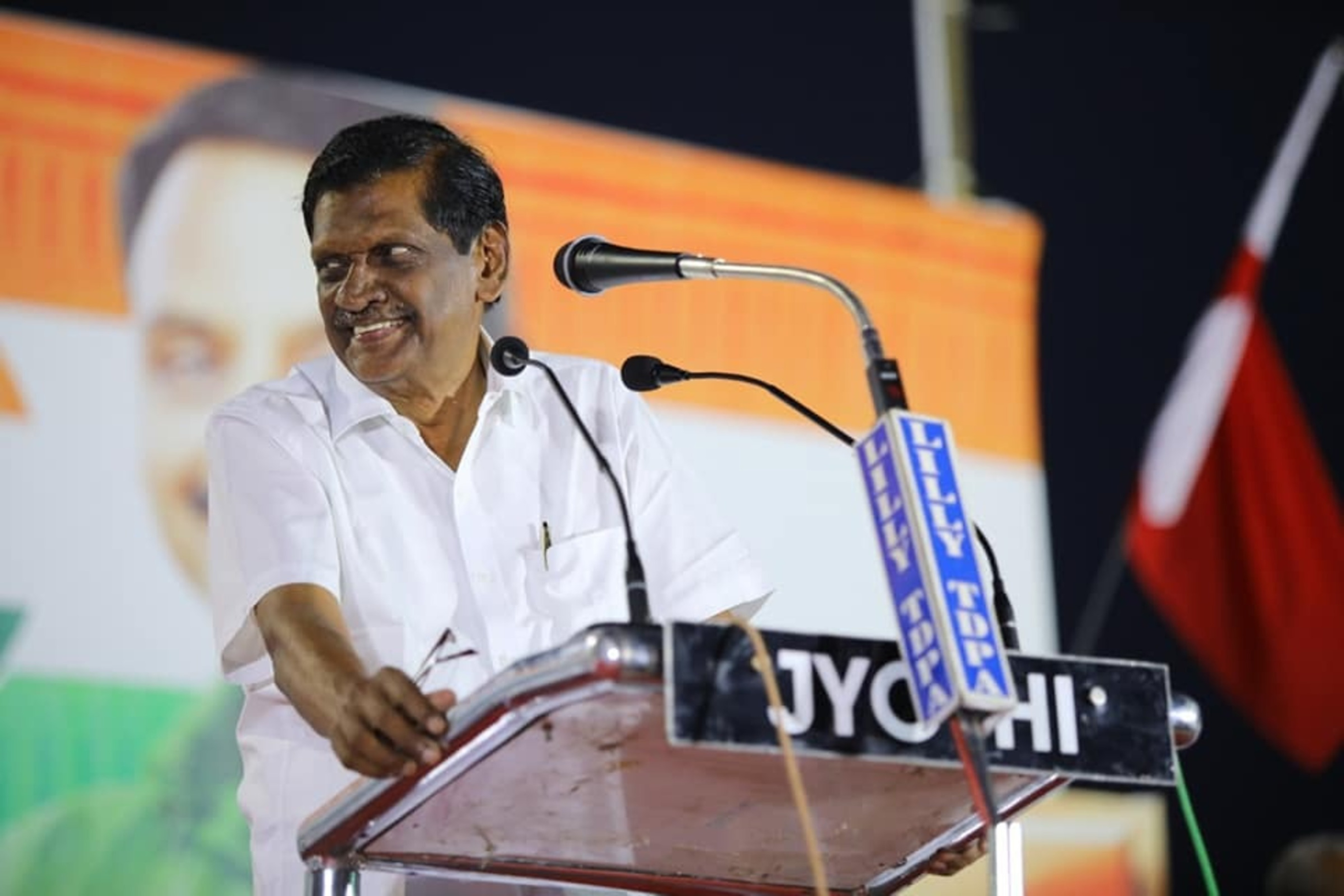

Member of the Kerala Legislative Assembly
- In office 11 May 2006 – 21 May 2026
- Preceded by: P. T. Thomas
- Succeeded by: Apu John Joseph
- Constituency: Thodupuzha
- In office 9 May 1996 – 11 May 2001
- Preceded by: P. T. Thomas
- Succeeded by: P. T. Thomas
- Constituency: Thodupuzha
- In office 17 September 1970 – 23 March 1991
- Preceded by: K. C. Zacharia
- Succeeded by: P. T. Thomas
- Constituency: Thodupuzha

Chairman Of Kerala Congress
- Incumbent
- Assumed office 27 April 2021

Minister for Water Resources, Irrigation and Inland Navigation, Government of Kerala
- In office 23 May 2011 – 20 May 2016
- Preceded by: N. K. Premachandran
- Succeeded by: Mathew T. Thomas
- Constituency: Thodupuzha

Minister for Public Works, Government of Kerala
- In office 17 August 2009 – 30 April 2010
- Preceded by: Mons Joseph
- Succeeded by: V. K. Ebrahimkunju
- Constituency: Thodupuzha
- In office 17 May 2006 – 4 September 2006
- Preceded by: M. K. Muneer
- Succeeded by: T. U. Kuruvilla
- Constituency: Thodupuzha
- In office 20 May 1996 – 13 May 2001
- Preceded by: C. T. Ahammed Ali
- Succeeded by: M. K. Muneer
- Constituency: Thodupuzha

Minister for Education, Government of Kerala
- In office 20 May 1996 – 13 May 2001
- Preceded by: E. T. Muhammed Basheer
- Succeeded by: Nalakath Soopy
- Constituency: Thodupuzha
- In office 28 December 1981 – 17 March 1982
- Preceded by: Baby John
- Succeeded by: T. M. Jacob
- Constituency: Thodupuzha

Minister for Revenue and Housing, Government of Kerala
- In office 28 December 1981 – 25 March 1987
- Preceded by: P. S. Sreenivasan
- Succeeded by: P. S. Sreenivasan
- Constituency: Thodupuzha

Minister for Home Affairs, Government of Kerala
- In office 16 January 1978 – 15 September 1978
- Preceded by: K. M. Mani
- Succeeded by: K. M. Mani
- Constituency: Thodupuzha

Personal details
- Born: 28 June 1941 (age 85) Purapuzha, Kingdom of Travancore, British India (present day Idukki, Kerala, India)
- Party: Kerala Congress
- Spouse: Dr. Santha Joseph (m. 1971)
- Children: 4, Including Apu John Joseph
- Education: St. Berchmans College, Changanasserry; St. Thomas College, Thrissur

Palathinal Joseph Joseph (born 28 June 1941) is an Indian politician from Kerala Congress who served as a member of the Kerala Legislative Assembly from Thodupuzha constituency.

A former cabinet minister, Joseph entered Kerala politics through Kerala Congress in 1968.

== Early life ==
P. J. Joseph was born to Palathinal Joseph and Annamma at Purapuzha in the Idukki district of Kerala. He was married to Dr. Santha Joseph (died 2023), who was the Additional Director of the Kerala Health Department on 15 September 1971. The couple has four children, three sons and one daughter, named Apu John Joseph, Dr. Anu Yamuna, Antony Joseph, and the late Jomon Joseph. Jomon Joseph, the youngest, suffered from Down's Syndrome and died due to a massive heart attack in 2020 at age 34.

== Political career ==
Joseph entered Kerala politics through Kerala Congress in 1968.

P. J. Joseph contested and won his first election from Thodupuzha to the Kerala legislative assembly. He won these elections on ten occasions (1970, 1977, 1980, 1982, 1987, 1996, 2006, 2011, 2016, 2021). He held various ministerial positions within the Government of Kerala.

=== As Home Minister (1978) ===
Joseph's first time as a Minister was in 1978 as Home Minister in A. K. Antony's ministry. He served this role for nearly 8 months. He resigned the position for his colleague K.M Mani.

=== As Revenue minister (1981-1987) ===
Since 1981 Joseph became Revenue minister in K. Karunakaran's ministry. Joseph was Revenue minister between 1981 and 1982 and 1982–1987.

=== As Education minister (1996-2001) ===
In E. K. Nayanar's ministry between (1996 and 2001) Joseph was Education minister. He was instrumental in delinking Pre Degree from Colleges and merged with School Education as +2.

=== PWD minister (2006-2010) ===
He was short-term PWD minister in V. S. Achuthanandan's ministry in 2006 and 2010. He resigned twice. The first time he was accused of misbehaviour with a lady co-passenger. He was acquitted by the court. The second time was for leaving Left Democratic Front for united Kerala congress. It was after 23 years, Joseph's party again merged with Kerala Congress (M) and an alliance member of United Democratic Front (UDF).

=== Kerala Congress (Joseph) ===
In 1979 he parted ways with Kerala congress leader K. M. Mani to form a Kerala Congress (Joseph) new party. However, in 1985 Kerala congress leaders K. M. Mani (from Kerala Congress (M)), P. J. Joseph from Kerala Congress (Joseph), R. Balakrishna Pillai (from Kerala Congress (B)) and their parties merged forming the united Kerala Congress. This party split in 1987. P. J. Joseph continued in United Democratic Front (UDF) till 1989. He contested the Lok Sabha at Muvattupuzha and Idukki in 1989 and 1991, but was unsuccessful. Kerala Congress (Joseph) issue raised in Muvattupuzha Lok Sabha seat made him leave the alliance and join LDF. Since 1991 Joseph's party became part of the Left Democratic Front (LDF) as an alliance.

In 2010, after 23 years, Joseph's party again merged with Kerala Congress (M) and an alliance member of United Democratic Front (UDF).

On 30 April 2010, Joseph resigned from the LDF government and declared his party's merger with K. M. Mani's party. After UDF's win in Kerala Legislative Assembly's election in 2011, Oommen Chandy became Chief Minister of Kerala. Joseph was appointed minister for the 7th time, now with the portfolio of irrigation; he completed his term in 2016.

=== Chairman Of Kerala Congress ===
A power struggle erupted in the party between Jose K. Mani faction and P. J. Joseph fraction. The Election Commission intervened and it ruled in favor of Jose K Mani. Later, the faction led by P.J Joseph merged with Kerala Congress.

On 27 April an online meeting was convened by the party leadership in Thodupuzha and P.J Joseph was chosen as party chairman.

=== Controversies ===
Joseph resigned from the Kerala Cabinet on 4 September 2006 as he was accused of misbehaviour with a lady co-passenger on a Kingfisher flight. He was acquitted by court on 11 May 2009 due to insufficient evidence.

He instituted the Gandhian Studies Centre and the Gandhi Centre for Sustainable Development.

== See also ==
- Second Oommen Chandy ministry
- V. S. Achuthanandan ministry
- Third E. K. Nayanar ministry
- Third K. Karunakaran ministry
- Second K. Karunakaran ministry
- First A. K. Antony ministry
