= Irukallummudi =

Irukallummudi (ഇരുകല്ലുംമുടി) a lesser-known scenic cliff near Thodupuzha, in Kerala, India.

== Location ==
Irukallummudi is located in Cheppukulam about 20 km from Thodupuzha. The place provides bird's eye view of Muttom Dam reservoir on one side and Ilaveezha Poonchira on the other.

== Gallery ==
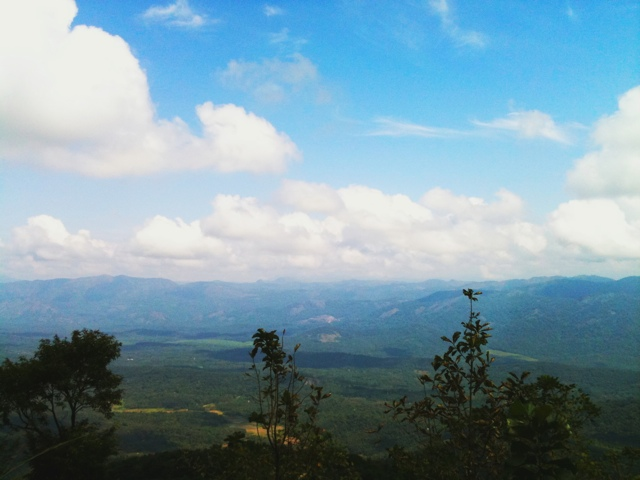
Irukallummudi View

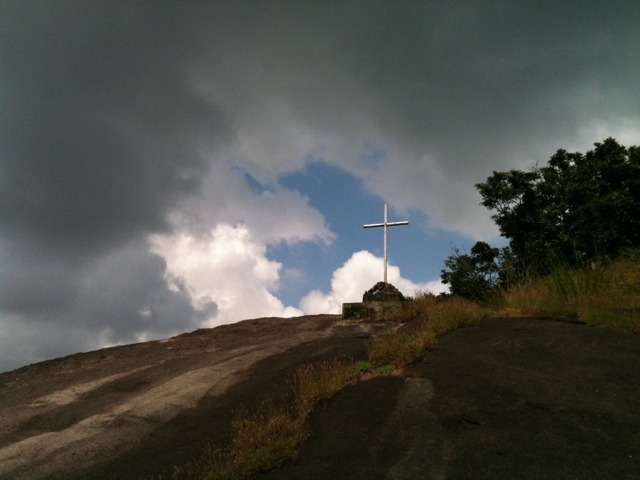
Mountain Top
