= Pandikasala =

- Location in Kerala, India Pandikasala (India)
- Coordinates: 10°52′0″N 76°3′0″E
- Country: India
- State: Kerala
- District: Malappuram

Languages
  - Official: Malayalam, English
- Time zone: UTC+5:30 (IST)
- PIN: 679571
- Vehicle registration: KL-

Pandikasala is a small town in Malappuram district in the state of Kerala, India. It is a part of Kuttippuram Gramapanchayat.

== Temples and Masjid ==
- Mahadeva Temple
- Bilal Masjid

== Transportation ==
Pandikasala village connects to other parts of India through Kuttippuram town. National highway No.66 passes through Edappal and the northern stretch connects to Goa and Mumbai. The southern stretch connects to Cochin and Trivandrum. National Highway No.966 connects to Palakkad and Coimbatore. The nearest airport is at Kozhikode. The nearest major railway station is at Kuttippuram.
