= Karikkode (village) =

- village
- Location in Kerala, India Karikkode (India)
- Coordinates: 9°53′0″N 76°43′0″E
- Country: India
- State: Kerala
- District: Idukki

Government
  - Type: Panchayati raj (India)
  - Body: Gram panchayat

Population (2011)
  - Total: 14,242

Languages
  - Official: Malayalam, English
- Time zone: UTC+5:30 (IST)

Karikkode is a village in Idukki district in the Indian state of Kerala. Karikkode is near by Thodupuzha town. Film actor Asif Ali's native place is Karikkode.

== Demographics ==
As of 2011 India census, Karikkode had a population of 14242 with 7083 males and 7159 females.

== Religion ==
There is a Hindu temple viz., Bhagavathy Temple at Karikkode, Thodupuzha in Idukki.
