= Kariyannur =

- village
- Location in Kerala, India Kariyannur (India)
- Coordinates: 10°40′30″N 76°9′0″E
- Country: India
- State: Kerala
- District: Thrissur

Government
  - Body: Panchayath

Population (2011)
  - Total: 6,363

Malayalam, English
  - Kariyannur: Malayalam, English
- Time zone: UTC+5:30 (IST)
- PIN: 680584
- Vehicle registration: KL-48

Kariyannur is a village in the Thrissur district of Kerala, India.

== Demographics ==
As of 2011 India census, Kariyannur had a population of 6,363, with 3,065 males and 3,298 females.
