= Thommankuthu =

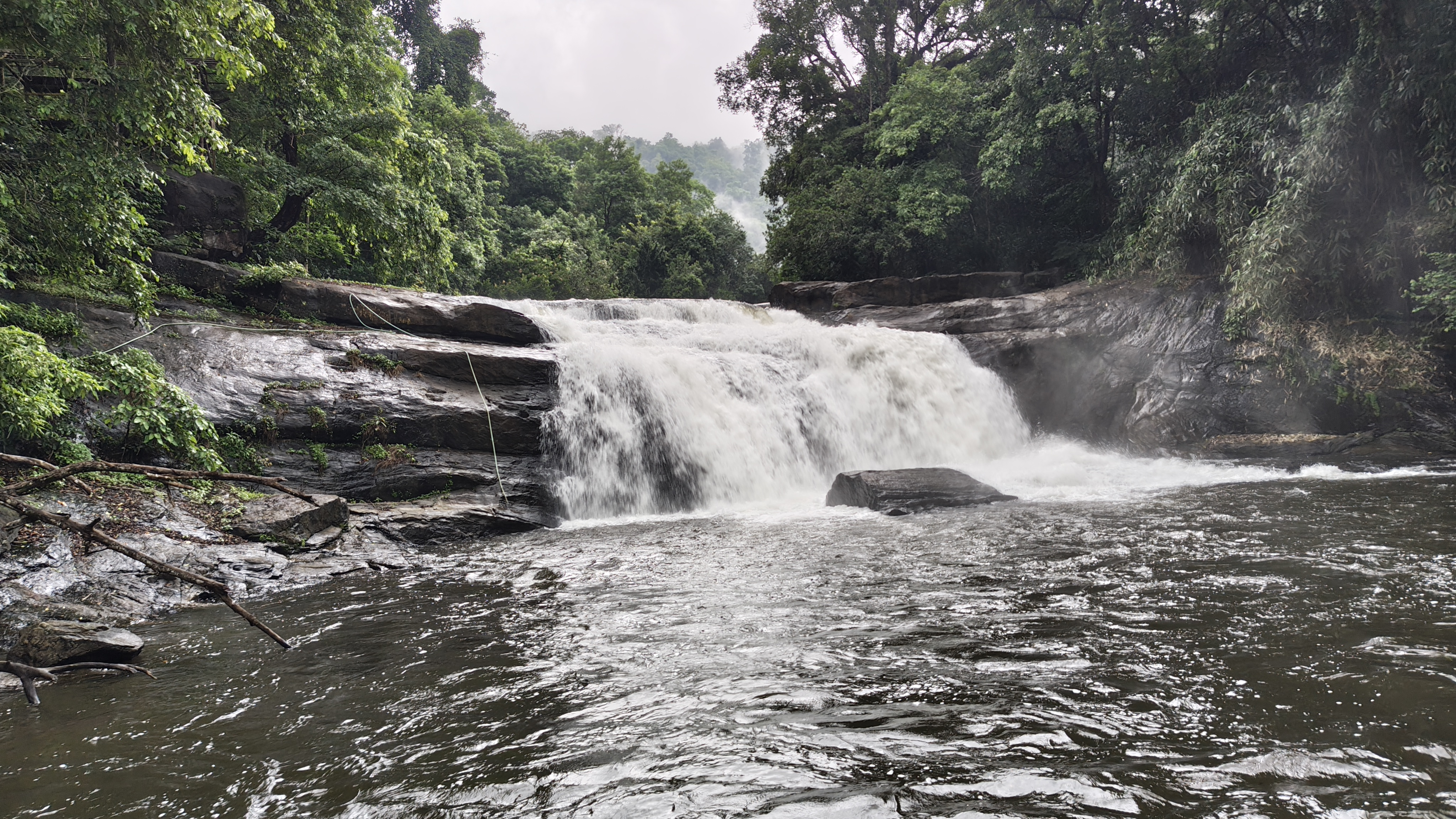
- Thommankuthu Waterfalls
- Interactive map of Thommankuthu
- Location: Kerala, India
- Watercourse: Kaliyar River

Thommankuthu Waterfalls in Winter

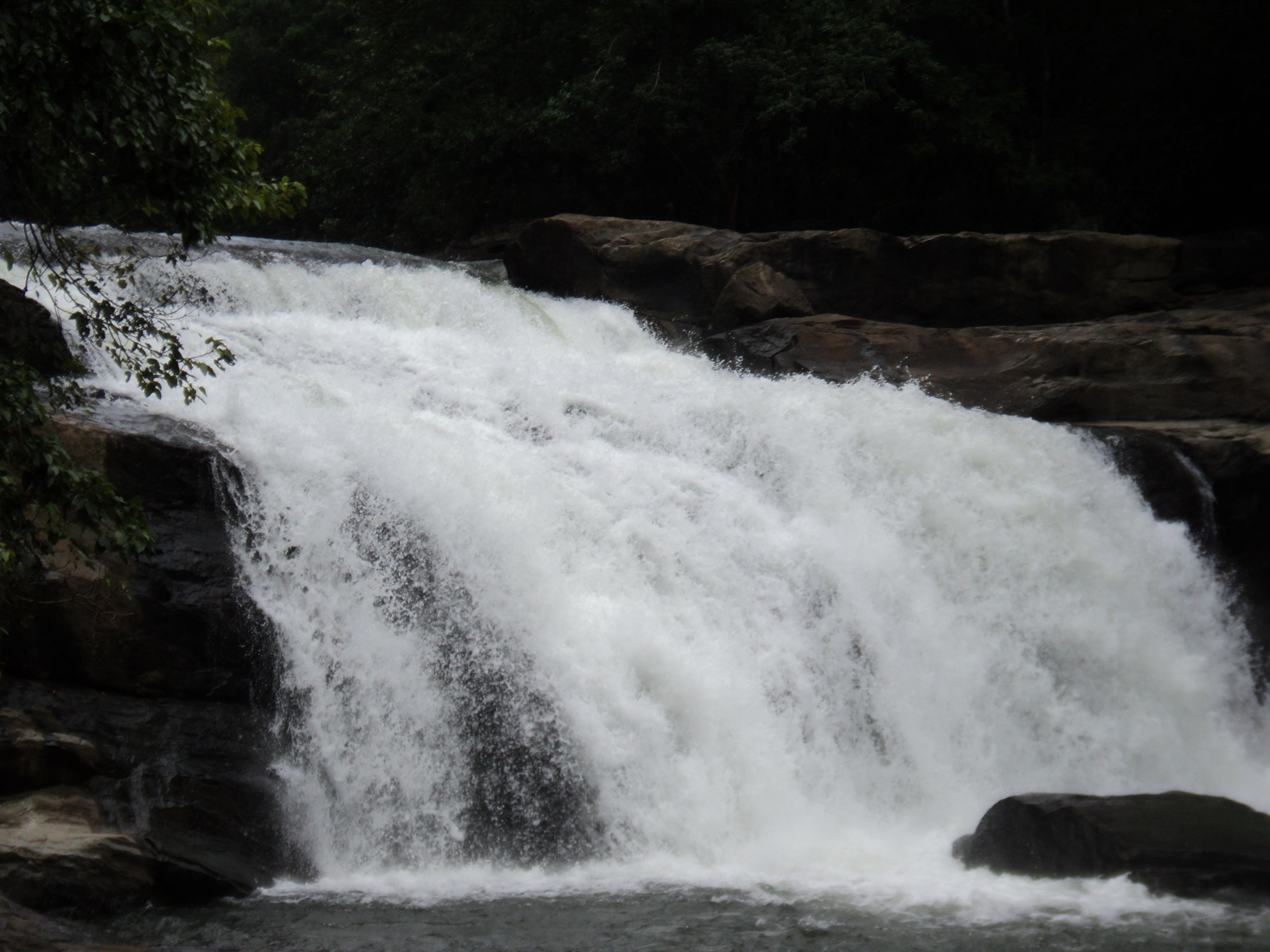
Closer view of Thommankuthu Falls

Thommankuthu is a waterfall located in Thodupuzha Thaluk, Idukki District, Kerala, India. It is one of the major centres of eco-tourism in Kerala. The seven-step waterfall is situated in a forest in the southern part of Western Ghats mountain range. Thommankuthu is a series of 12 falls over a distance of 5 kilometres (3.1 mi).

== Location ==
Thommankuthu is located 18 kilometres (11 mi) from Thodupuzha. The nearest towns are Karimannoor, Vannappuram and Udumbannoor, which are nearly 10 kilometres (6.2 mi) from Thommankuthu. The waterfalls can be reached with a 12 kilometres (7.5 mi) trek through the surrounding forests. The falls are positioned in a dense forest area, attracting nature enthusiasts and travelers.

== History and Legends ==
Thommankuthu takes its name from a local legend. According to folklore, a local man named Thomman drowned in the waterfall while attempting to cross the river. Following this incident, the falls became known as Thomman's Waterfall or Thommankuthu (kuthu meaning waterfall).

== See also ==
- Anayadikuthu Waterfalls
- List of waterfalls
- List of waterfalls in India
