= Karimannoor =

- Panchayat
- Location in Kerala Location in India
- Coordinates: 9°54′0″N 76°47′0″E
- Country: India
- State: Kerala
- District: Idukki

Government
  - Type: Grama Panchayat
  - Panchayat President: Devasia Devasia
- Elevation: 60 m (200 ft)

Languages
  - Official: Malayalam, English
- Time zone: UTC+5:30 (IST)
- PIN: 685581
- Telephone code: 04862
- Vehicle registration: KL-38
- Nearest city: Thodupuzha
- Lok Sabha constituency: Idukki
- Climate: almost same as in all over kerala (Köppen)

Karimannoor is a panchayat of India; earlier it was a Legislative Constitutancy, belonging to Thodupuzha Taluk in Idukki District, Kerala, India. The main occupation of the population is agriculture, predominantly of natural rubber. Demographically people belonging to Christian, Hindu and Muslim religions live harmoniously in this beautiful piece of land in God's very Own Country. The predominant community here is the Syro-Malabar Catholic Christians. Karimannoor is about 10 kilometres east of Thodupuzha, the taluk capital.

It's an entrance point to Thommankuthu waterfalls and the alternate route to the high ranges of Idukki through Udumbannoor and Paramada and lies along the state highway 43 (SH-43). Thommankuthu water falls is a major tourist attraction. Thommankuthu is nearly 8 km from Karimannoor and one of the major eco-tourism centres in Kerala.

The village has a lot of educational institutions. It has one Higher Secondary School (St. Joseph's H.S.S Karimannoor), 2 High schools(St.Sebastian's H.S. & Nirmala Public School[Unaided]), 3 Upper Primary Schools (TCMMUPS Mulappuram, Govt. UPS Karimannoor & Winners Public School Karimannoor[Unaided]), 4 Lower Primary Schools (Holy Family LPS Karimannoor, Little Flower LPS Pallikkamuri, SN Neyyasseri) etc.

Karimmanoor is developing rapidly in the business field and its transport system. Once a village, now it is a town.
