= Purapuzha =

- village
- Location in Kerala, India Purapuzha (India)
- Coordinates: 9°52′0″N 76°40′0″E
- Country: India
- State: Kerala
- District: Idukki

Population (2011)
  - Total: 11,836

Languages
  - Official: Malayalam, English
- Time zone: UTC+5:30 (IST)
- Postal code: 685583

Purapuzha is a village in Idukki district in the Indian state of Kerala. Purapuzha could be reached by bus from Thodupuzha within 25 minutes. It is only 8 km (5.0 mi) away from Thodupuzha.

== Demographics ==
As of 2011 India census, Purapuzha had a population of 11836 with 5926 males and 5910 females.
