= Vannappuram =

- village
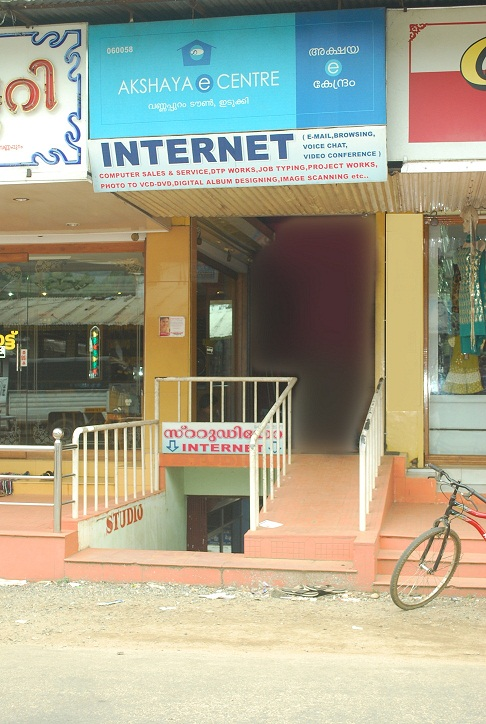
- Akshaya E-centre
- Interactive map of Vannappuram
- Coordinates: 9.9911800°N 76.80496°E
- Country: India
- State: Kerala
- District: Idukki

Population (2011)
  - Total: 28,905

Languages
  - Official: Malayalam, English
- Time zone: UTC+5:30 (IST)
- PIN: 685607
- Telephone code: 0486
- Vehicle registration: KL-38, KL-06
- Nearest city: Thodupuzha , Kochi, Kottayam, Thopramkudy, Kattappana
- Lok Sabha constituency: Idukki
- Vidhan Sabha constituency: Thodupuzha
- Climate: Tropical monsoon (Köppen)
- Avg. summer temperature: 32.5 °C (90.5 °F)
- Avg. winter temperature: 20 °C (68 °F)

Vannappuram is a village in the Idukki district of state Kerala in India . The village is in the highland regions and is loacated 17 km north of Thodupuzha Town and 28 km east of Muvattupuzha Town and lies north of the Kaliyar River.

== Demographics ==
As of 2011 the India census records Vannappuram had a population of 28905 with 14547 males and 14358 females.
