= Thodupuzha =

- Municipality
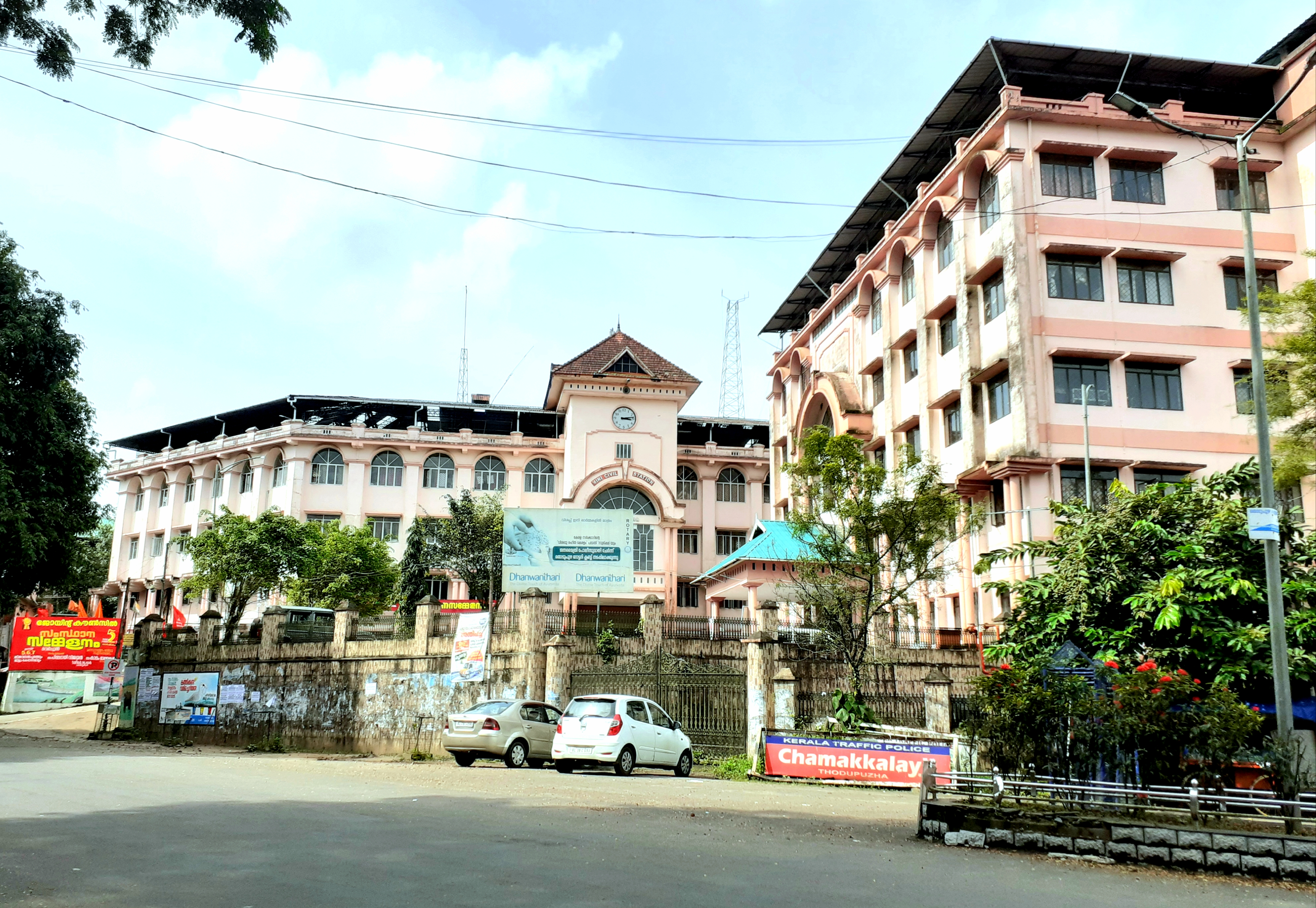
- Thodupuzha Civil Station Complex

- Location in Kerala, India Thodupuzha (India)
- Coordinates: 9.89998°N 76.71920°E
- Country: India
- State: Kerala
- District: Idukki

Government
  - Type: First Grade Municipality
  - Member of Legislative Assembly: Apu John Joseph (KC/UDF)
  - Municipal Chairman: Mrs. Saabira Jaleel, IUML

Area
  - Total: 35.43 km^{2} (13.68 sq mi)
- Elevation: 40 m (130 ft)

Population (2011)
  - Total: 52,045
  - Density: 1,469/km^{2} (3,805/sq mi)

Languages
  - Official: Malayalam, English
- Time zone: UTC+5:30 (IST)
- PIN: 685584
- Telephone code: 04862
- Vehicle registration: KL-38
- Nearest city: Kottayam, Kochi
- Nearest Railway Stations: Piravam Road(PVRD) 38 km Ettumanoor (ETM) 45.9 km Thrippunithura (TRTR) 50.3 km Aluva (AWY) 54 km Kottayam (KTYM) 54.2 km Ernakulam Jn. / Ernakulam South (ERS) 59.2 km Ernakulam Town / Ernakulam North (ERN) 59.8 km
- Nearest Airport: Cochin International Airport (COK) 54 km
- Vidhan Sabha constituency: Thodupuzha
- Lok Sabha constituency: Idukki
- Climate: Tropical monsoon (Köppen)
- Avg. summer temperature: 32.5 °C (90.5 °F)
- Avg. winter temperature: 23 °C (73 °F)

Thodupuzha ([kaʈ:ap:ɐna]) is a municipality and taluk in the Idukki district of Kerala, India. It is located 55 km (34.2 mi) west of the district headquarters in Painavu and about 195 km (121.2 mi) north of the state capital Thiruvananthapuram. As per the 2011 Indian census, Thodupuzha has a population of 52,045 people, and a population density of 1,468/km^{2} (3,800/sq mi).

Thodupuzha is the largest town and main commercial centre in Idukki. It is bordered by the Kottayam district on the southern side and the Ernakulam District on the western side. It also acts as a gateway to various tourist spots in the High Range regions towards its east, including Munnar, Thekkady, and Peermade.

== Etymology ==
During the annexation of the Vadakkumkoor principality by the Kingdom of Travancore, the capital Karikkode was destroyed by Diwan Ramayyan and his forces. In response, Anizham Thirunal Marthanda Varma, the Maharaja of Travancore, appointed Elasamprathi Narayana Varma as the administrator of the newly acquired territory. A nearby area called Edavathuruth, surrounded by hillocks and rocky terrain, was selected as the new headquarters of Thodupuzha taluk. The former capital Karikkode was reduced to a small village known as a "Pakuthy". The Maharaja also appointed Mallan Sankaran of Palliyadi as surveyor to prepare land revenue records, including the Ozhukku survey and Kandezhuthu settlement. As Mallan Sankaran failed to execute his mission due to widespread objection and riot of the local people, survey was only completed during the reign of Karthikathirunal Ramavarma. The place was named Thodupuzha by the Raja of Vadakkumkoor Maluvakon Manikantan who used to reside in his palace at Vaickam and Edavetty(Mattam Palace) near Karikkode, used to mention the nearby flowing wide "Valiyathodu" as thodu (transl. "rivulet") puzha (transl. "river"). It is believed that the stream developed into a river due to the changes in geophysical conditions of the area wherefrom it originates and enter the vally of Arakulam, to be known as Thodupuzha river and the town on the banks of the river came to be known as Thodupuzha. There is another version that defines thodu as "touch" instead. The Mattathil Kovilakam were the protectors and rulers of the region. The last ruler of the region was Elasamprathi Narayana Varma, who originally came from Trivandrum and was the representative of Maharaja of Travancore Anizhamthirunal Marthanda Varma.

== History ==
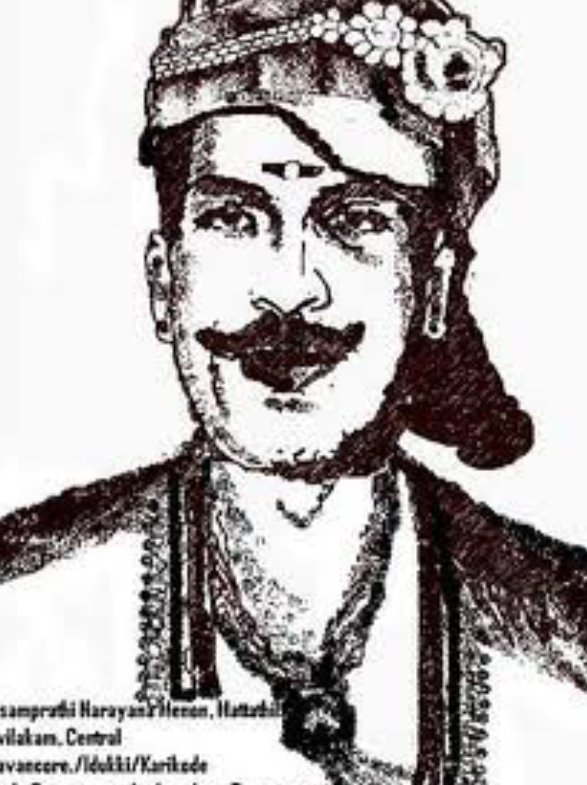
Sarvadhikari Elasamprathi Narayana Varma of Vadakkumkur

The Vadakkumkur kings used to live in Karikode for several years. Vadakkumkur was a late medieval/early modern feudal principality located in Kerala. After the kingdom separated, Thekkumkur became an independent kingdom, while Vadakkumkur became a vassal of Cochin. During the time of Portuguese dominance in Cochin, disputes arose between the Vadakkumkur chieftain and the Kingdom of Cochin over the pepper trade, and the Vadakkumkur raja was killed in battle with Cochin and their Portuguese allies. After the attack, Vadakkumkur palace split into two branches: one was known as Mattathil Palace, which remained in Thondikkuzha; and the other one in Kadanadu Pala. Vadakkumkur and Thekkumkur were later annexed by Marthanda Varma and incorporated into the kingdom of Travancore. Maharaja appointed his representative known as Elasamprathi Narayana Varam to develop the region called Keezhmalainadu. Varam became known as the father of Keezhmalainadu and modern Thodupuzha.

Varam erected many monuments, including the government offices, Pandikasala, and temples. The Karikode mosque and other buildings in Thodupuzha and Muvattupuzha also date from his reign. Elasamprathi Narayana Varma is credited with introducing a new system of tax collection in the region. Thodupuzha is an ancient town with a history spanning several centuries. Buddhist and Jain influences reached Thodupuzha and surrounding areas as early as the 3rd century BCE.

In the 14th century, Kerala was divided into several administrative provinces, including Venadu, Otanadu, Navishainadu, Munjunadu, Vempolinadu, and Keezhmalainadu. Thodupuzha and Muvattupuzha were part of Keezhmalainadu, which existed until 1600, when it was defeated by Vadakkumkoor and subsequently became part of that principality.

St George Syro-Malabar Forane Church at Muthalakodam St. George Forane Church MuthalakodamWayback MachineSt. George's Forane Church, Muthalakodam · WP6M+764, SH44, Muthalakodam, Kerala 685605, India, near Thodupuzha, is believed to have constructed before the 13th century. It was re-built several times since then and the current structure was built in the year 1973.

Mylacombu St Thomas Syro-Malabar Church, Thodupuzha Architecture of Churches in Kerala | Christianity in Kerala | Kerala TourismSt. Thomas Forane Church, Mylacombu · WMFX+QPQ, Mylacombu, Kumaramangalam, Idukki, Kerala 685608, India is believed to be built in 660 AD by Syrian Christian settlers in Mylacombu near Thodupuzha who migrated from Kuravilangad, Kodungallur, Angamaly, Kadamattom and Vadakara, Koothattukulam.

St Mary's Syro-Malabar Church, Nediyasala St. Mary's Syro Malabar Church, Nediyasala · VMPF+PMM, Thodupuzha, Koothattukulam Road, Nediyasala, Kerala 685608, India near Thodupuzha is another ancient church in the locality.

After Indian independence, from 1949 to 1956, Thodupuzha was a part of the Kottayam district in Travancore-Cochin state. In 1956, when Kerala state was formed, Thodupuzha remained as a part of Kottayam district until 1958, when Ernakulam district was formed on 1 April 1958 and C. A. Mathew (മാത്യു ചൂരപുഴ) became the first member of the Kerala Legislative Assembly from 1957 to 1960, and from 1960 to 1965. In 1972, the Idukki district was formed by merging the Thodupuzha taluk with the Devikulam, Udumbanchola and Peermade taluks, which were part of the Kottayam district.

== Demographics ==
Religions in Thodupuzha Taluka(2011)
Religion	Percent(%)
Christianity	45.15%
Hinduism	40.57%
Islam	14.03%
Sikhism	0.01%
Buddhism	0.03%
Jainism	0.00%
Not stated	0.2%
Others	0.04%

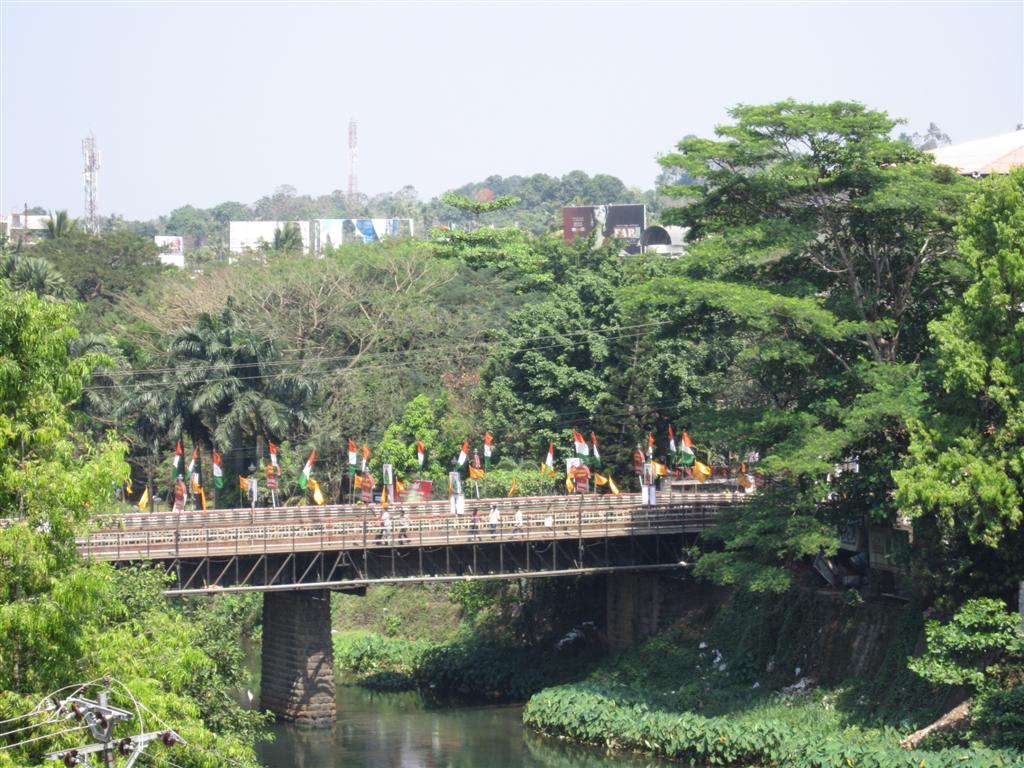
Old bridge of Thodupuzha

As of 2011 Census, Thodupuzha Taluka, with an area of 884.93 km^{2} (341.67 sq mi) had a total population of 325,951; males comprised 49% of the population and females 51%. The literacy rate of Thodupuzha Taluka in 2011 was 95.56%, in which, male and female literacy were 96.81% and 94.33% respectively. In Thodupuzha, 9% of the population was under the age of six.

== Economy and infrastructure ==
Thodupuzha taluk (later bifurcated into Thodupuzha and Idukki taluks) lies mostly in the low-range plains of central Kerala. The area serves as a major trading hub for hill produce, including rubber, coconut, black pepper, tapioca, banana, ginger, turmeric, pineapple, and cocoa.Prior to the rise of real estate development, large areas in the region were used for paddy cultivation. However, paddy farming has largely been abandoned by farmers in recent decades. Agriculture, particularly rubber cultivation, has traditionally been the mainstay of Thodupuzha's economy. Other crops such as pineapple, coconut, rice, pepper, cocoa, tapioca, banana, ginger, turmeric are also cultivated. In recent decades, Thodupuzha has seen growth in small-scale and village industries, supported by state government policies. Several manufacturing units have been established in the area, including The Dhanwanthari Vaidyasala (the first Ayurvedic medicine manufacturing unit in the district), Nagarjuna, Guardian Controls, Lunar Chappals, Saro Plast, and Brahmins Industries.

The town has also benefited from improved infrastructure, including bypass roads, and the presence of numerous public and private institutions.

|+Neighbouring cities & towns |

|}

== Climate ==
Climate data for Thodupuzha, Kerala
Month	Jan	Feb	Mar	Apr	May	Jun	Jul	Aug	Sep	Oct	Nov	Dec	Year
Mean daily maximum °C (°F)	31.8 (89.2)	32.8 (91.0)	33.9 (93.0)	33.9 (93.0)	32.9 (91.2)	30.6 (87.1)	29.8 (85.6)	29.8 (85.6)	30.5 (86.9)	30.6 (87.1)	30.7 (87.3)	31.3 (88.3)	31.6 (88.8)
Mean daily minimum °C (°F)	22.1 (71.8)	23.0 (73.4)	24.6 (76.3)	25.5 (77.9)	25.3 (77.5)	24.2 (75.6)	23.5 (74.3)	23.7 (74.7)	23.8 (74.8)	23.7 (74.7)	23.5 (74.3)	22.4 (72.3)	23.8 (74.8)
Average precipitation mm (inches)	23 (0.9)	43 (1.7)	64 (2.5)	170 (6.7)	360 (14.2)	705 (27.8)	779 (30.7)	587 (23.1)	342 (13.5)	368 (14.5)	208 (8.2)	64 (2.5)	3,713 (146.3)
Source: Climate-Data.org

== Politics ==
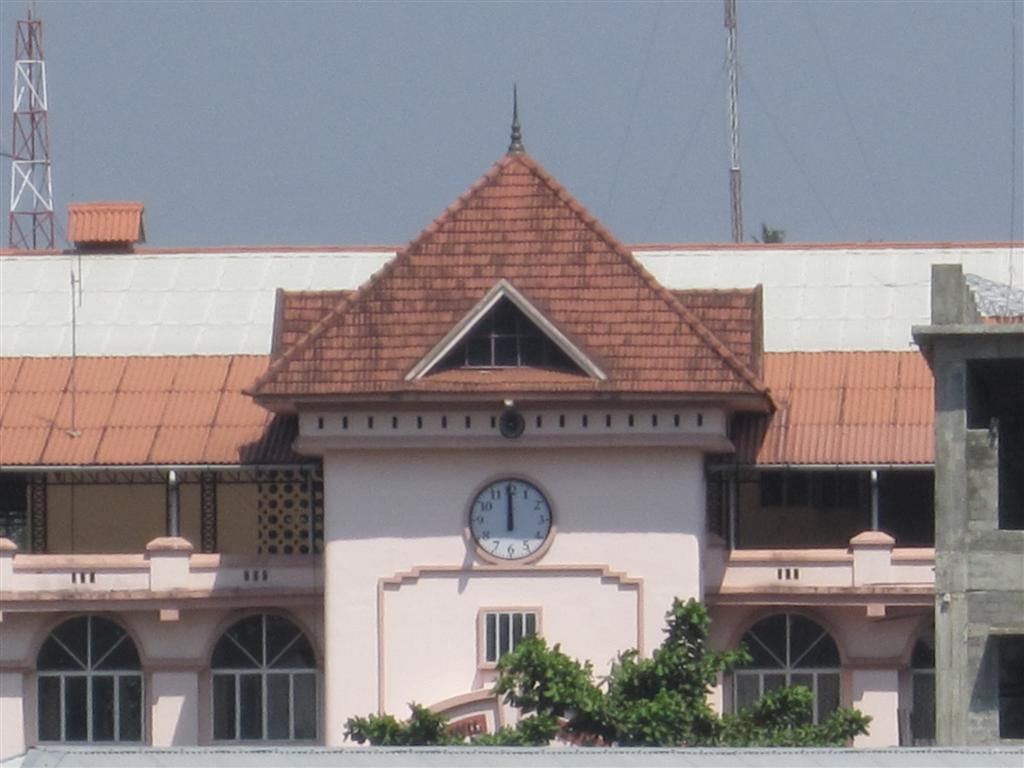
Civil Station

Thodupuzha was administered by a village panchayat and village union for several years, but on 1 September 1978, it was upgraded into a municipality. The Thodupuzha municipality was formed by merging the Thodupuzha panchayat with the neighboring panchayats of Kumaramangalam, Karikkode, and Manacaud. It was administered by a special officer for the first ten years. In 1988, the first popularly elected municipal council was formed, with N. Chandran as its chairman.

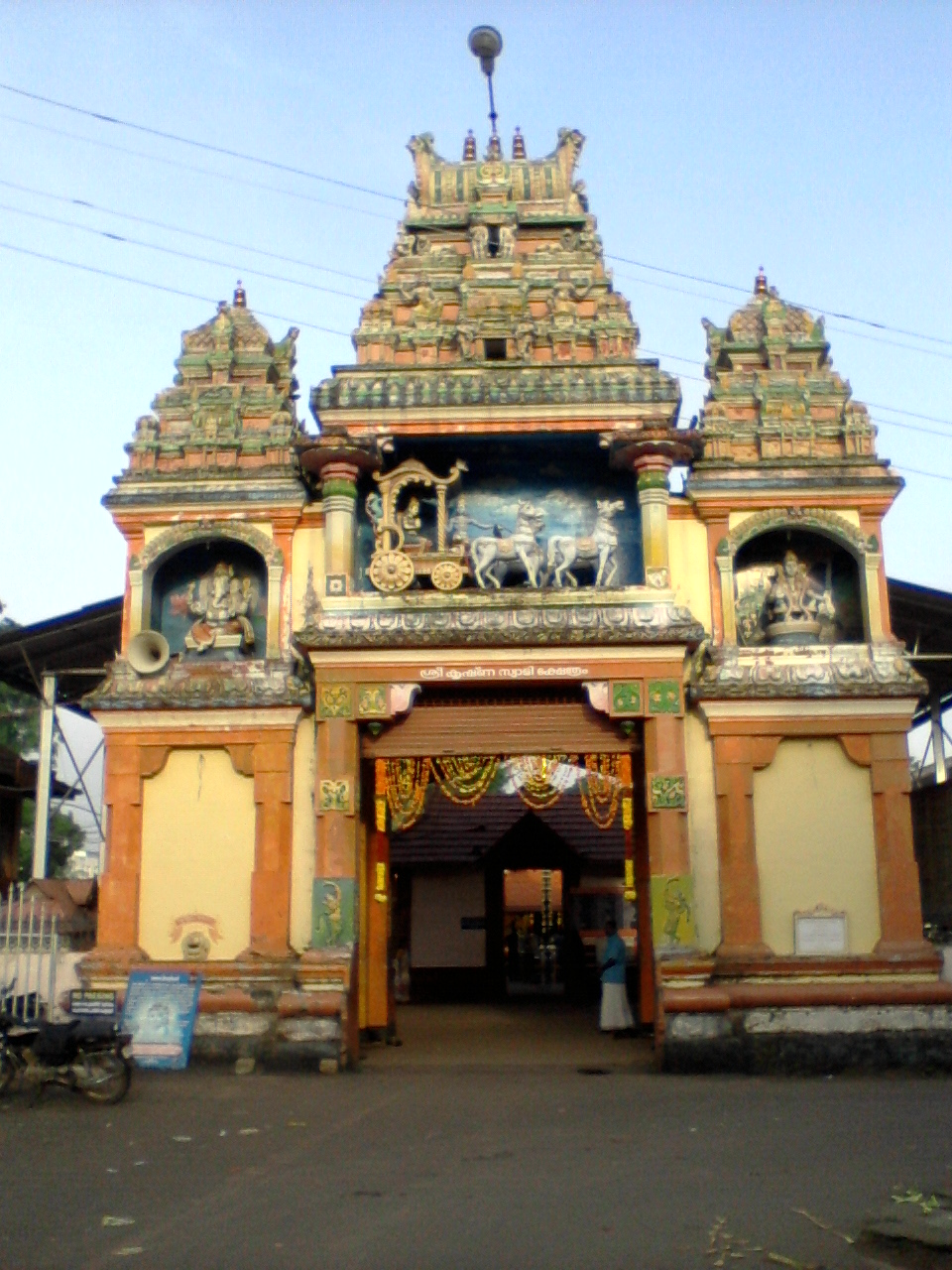
Sri Krishna Swami temple

== Sports ==
The Thodupuzha Cricket Stadium constructed by the Kerala Cricket Association is located in Thekkumbhagom, approximately five kilometers away from Thodupuzha, which is large enough to host two cricket matches at the same time.

== Municipality Members ==
Ward No.	Ward Name	Councilor Name	Party	Alliance
001	Vengalloor	T.K. Sudhakaran Nair	IND	OTH
002	Guru L.P.C.	Shimnas K.K.	CPI(M)	LDF
003	Vengathanam	Biji Suresh	IND	OTH
004	Madathikkandom	Raji Ajesh	INC	UDF
005	Municipal U.P. School	Deepak K.	INC	UDF
006	Ambalam	Gopalakrishnan K.	BJP	NDA
007	B.H.S	Subaida Seythumuhammad	IUML	UDF
008	Vadakkummurry	Safiya Jabbar	IUML	UDF
009	Pettenadu	Adv. Sreeja Rajesh	BJP	NDA
010	Muthalakodam West	Basheer	IND	OTH
011	Holy Family	Mercy Sebastian	KEC	UDF
012	Karoppara	Mini Tomy	IND	OTH
013	Kunnam	Annies John Kuzhikandathil	INC	UDF
014	Pattayamkavala	Adv. Jomon Ulahannan	KEC	UDF
015	Muthalakodam East	T.M. Basheer	IUML	UDF
016	Undaplavu	A.M. Haarid	IUML	UDF
017	B.T.M. School	Nishad	IUML	UDF
018	Kummamkallu	Saabira Jaleel	IUML	UDF
019	Malepparambu	Ramziya Niyas	IUML	UDF
020	Valiyajaram	Jisha Razak	IUML	UDF
021	Keerikode	Vishnu K. Sasi	INC	UDF
022	Muthaliyarmadom	Jithesh C. Injakattu	BJP	NDA
023	Municipal Office	P.A. Shahul Hameed	INC	UDF
024	Urumpilpalam	Renuka Rajasekharan	BJP	NDA
025	Maramkunnu	P.R. Vijayakumari	BJP	NDA
026	Kanjiramattom	Rajeswari	BJP	NDA
027	Olamattom	Joy Myladi	INC	UDF
028	Perukkoni	Litty Joseph	INC	UDF
029	Kothaikunnu	Rinkumol Sebastian	IND	OTH
030	Kolani	R. Hari	IND	OTH
031	Nadukkandom	Nisha Soman	INC	UDF
032	Parakkadavu	Kavitha N.S.	CPI(M)	LDF
033	Amaramkavu	Uma A.B.	BJP	NDA
034	Municipal Quarters	R. Aji	BJP	NDA
035	Co-operative Hospital	Rajesh Babu	INC	UDF
036	Chunkam	Athira Joshi	IND	OTH
037	River View	Prof. Jessy Antony	KC(M)	LDF
038	Manakkad	Padmakumar S.	BJP	NDA

== Education ==
- The first center of higher learning in the taluk was Newman College, Thodupuzha. It was established in 1964 by the Syrian Catholic Diocese of Kothamangalam and named after Cardinal Newman.
- The second college of Thodupuzha was established in 1982: St. Joseph's College in Arakkulam.
- The University College of Engineering, Thodupuzha, managed and run by the Mahatma Gandhi University, Kottayam, is located in Thodupuzha. The college started functioning in 1996.

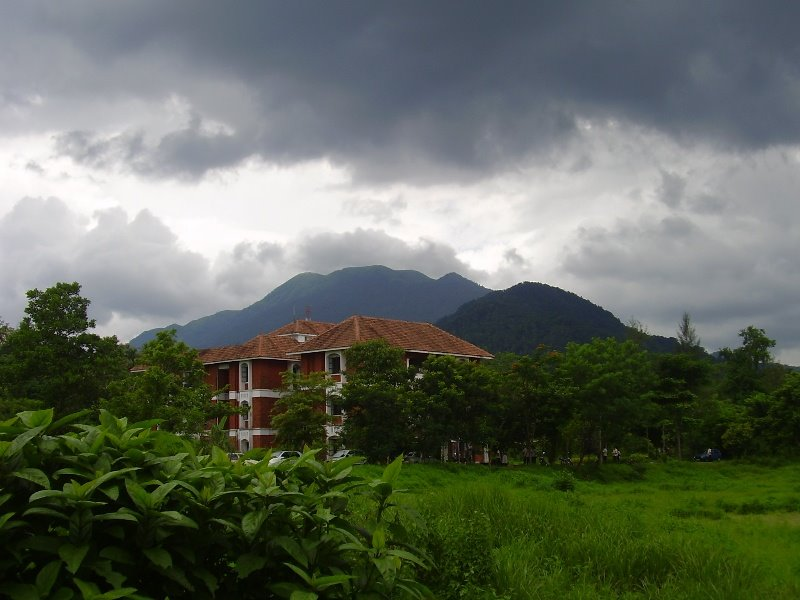
University College of Engineering

- St. Augustine`s H. S. S. Karimkunnam
- Govt. V H S S Thodupuzha
- Dr. A.P.J Abdul Kalam Govt. H S S Thodupuzha
- St. Sebastian`s H S Thodupuzha
- ST GEORGE H S S, MUTHALAKODAM, IDUKKI
- Sacred Heart Girls H S Muthalakodam
- St. George`s H S Kallanickal
- M K N M H S Kumaramangalam
- St. Rita`s High School Paynkulam
- St. Antony`s H S Kuninji
- St. Sebastian`s H S S Vazhithala
- St. Sebastian`s H S Purapuzha
- GOVT. HIGH SCHOOL ARIKUZHA
- Govt. U. P. School Thondikuzha
- Govt. L. P. School Arikuzha
- N. S. S. (Govt.) L.P. School Chittoor
- Govt. L. P. School Edavetty
- Govt. L. P. School Kaloor
- Govt. L. P. School Karimkunnam
- Govt. L. P. School Kuninji
- Govt. L. P. School Kumaramangalam
- Govt. L. P. School Purappuzha
- St. Sebastian`s U. P. School Ezhalloor
- S. G. U. P. School Kallanickal
- M. M. U. P. School Meenmutty
- S M U P S NEDIYASALA
- L. F. U. P. School Nediyakadu
- S. P. U. P. School Thattarathatta
- S. J. U. P. School Perumpillichira
- L. F. L. P. School Chittoor
- S. T. L. P. School Kolady
- St. Thomas U. P. S. Paynkulam
- S. J. L. P. School Peryampra
- P. L. P. School Perumpillichira
- S. A. L. P. School Vengalloor
- TECHNICAL HS PURAPPUZHA

== Notable people ==
- Ajitkumar Varma Deputy Inspector General of Police| CIB| Indian High Commission London,
- Asif Ali, film actor
- Askar Ali, film actor
- P. K. Abdul Aziz, vice-chancellor of Aligarh Muslim University
- Dileesh Nair, film director and screenwriter
- Hakkim Shajahan, film actor
- Jaffar Idukki, film actor
- P. J. Joseph, leader of Kerala Congress and former minister in the Second Oommen Chandy ministry
- Neeta Pillai, film actress
- Pappachen Pradeep, defender for the India national football team, former captain of the U23 team.
- Nishanth Sagar, film actor
- Rajesh Touchriver, film director
- Shiny Wilson (née Abraham), Olympian and Asian Games Medal Winner
- Binni Krishnakumar, singer and dancer
- Thodupuzha Vasanthi, film actress

== See also ==
- Arakuzha
- Muvattupuzha
- Erattupetta
- Irukallummudi
- Kottayam
- Kothamangalam
- Kumily
- Kuttikkanam
- Main Eastern Highway
- Muttom
- Pala
- Peermade
- Thenathoor
- Wagamon
- Vazhithala
- Njandirukky Waterfalls
- kalvari mount
