= Tata Consumer Products =

Indian consumer products company

Tata Consumer Products Limited
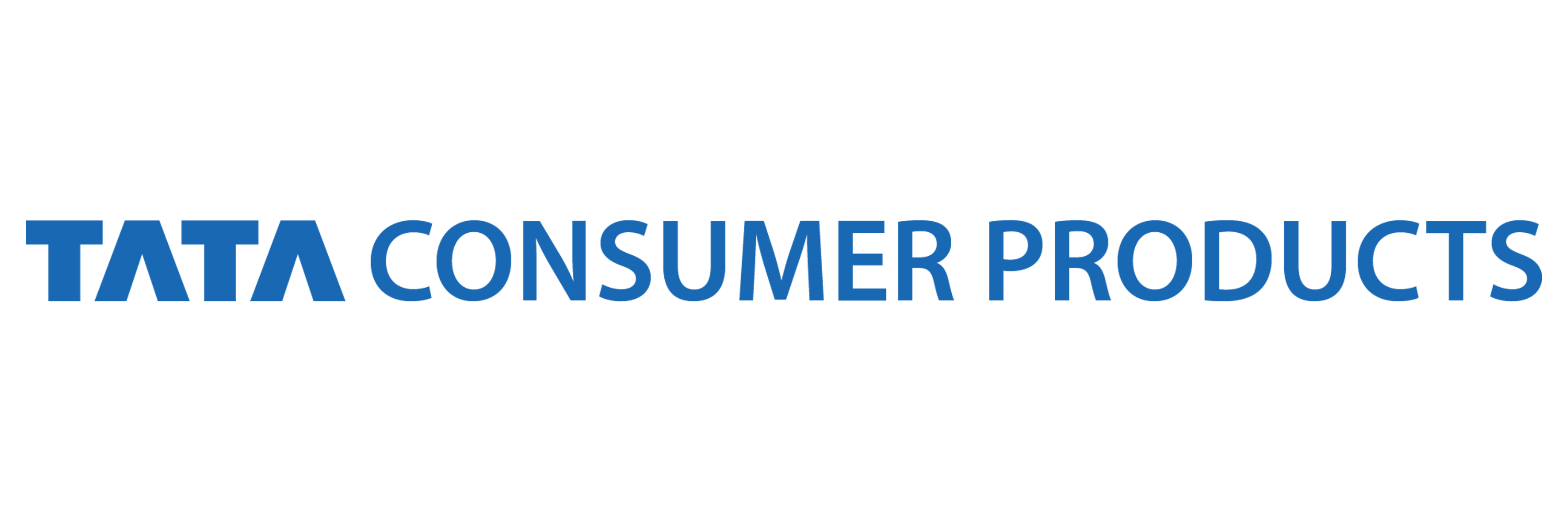
- Formerly: Tata Tea Limited; Tata Global Beverages Limited
- Type: Public
- Traded as: BSE: 500800; NSE: TATACONSUM; NSE NIFTY 50 constituent
- ISIN: INE192A01025
- Industry: Fast-moving consumer goods
- Headquarters: Kolkata, India
- Area served: Worldwide
- Key people: Natarajan Chandrasekaran (Chairman); Sunil D’Souza (CEO & MD)
- Revenue: ▲₹17,811 crore (US$1.8 billion) (FY2025)
- Operating income: ▲₹1,776 crore (US$180 million) (FY2025)
- Net income: ▲₹1,380 crore (US$140 million) (FY2025)
- Total assets: ▲₹31,977 crore (US$3.3 billion) (FY2025)
- Total equity: ▲₹21,390 crore (US$2.2 billion) (FY2025)
- Number of employees: 4,517 (2024)
- Parent: Tata Group
- Subsidiaries: Good Earth Tea; Tetley; Eight O'Clock Coffee; Organic India; Tata Starbucks (50%)
- Website: www.tataconsumer.com
- Footnotes; Financials as of 31 March 2025.

Tata Consumer Products Limited is an Indian fast-moving consumer goods company and a part of the Tata Group. Its registered office is located in Kolkata while its corporate headquarters is in Mumbai. It is the world's second-largest manufacturer and distributor of tea and a major producer of coffee.

Formerly known as Tata Global Beverages Limited (TGBL), Tata Consumer Products was formed when the consumer products business of Tata Chemicals merged with Tata Global Beverages in February 2020. The company now operates in the food and beverages industry, with ~56% of their revenue coming from India while the rest is from their international businesses. After the merger, the company controls Indian and international brands like Tata Salt, Tata Tea, Tetley, Eight O'Clock Coffee, Good Earth Tea, Tata Sampann and Tata Starbucks.

Tata Tea is the biggest-selling tea brand in India. Tetley is the biggest-selling tea brand in Canada and the second-biggest-selling in the United Kingdom and the United States.

== History ==
=== 1980 to 1990 ===
In the early 1980s, the tea industry in India was experiencing rising input and labour costs and dwindling margins as well as high taxes. India was facing competition in the world market not just from China, but also from other countries entering the business.

In 1983, Tata Tea bought the stake belonging to the James Finlay group to form the individual entity Tata Tea. In the same year, the company decided to move from the commodities business to consumer branding. The first brand Tata Tea was introduced. This was followed by other brands like Kannan Devan, Agni, Gemini and Chakra Gold. In spite of being the largest market in the world, the concept of branded tea took time to be accepted.

In 1987, Tata Tea set up a fully owned subsidiary, Tata Tea Inc., in the United States.

=== 1990 to 2000 ===
In the 1990s, Tata Tea decided to take its brands into the global markets. It formed an export joint venture with Britain's Tetley Tea in 1992. Other new enterprises included a majority interest in Consolidated Coffee Ltd. (Tata Coffee Ltd.) and a joint venture to manage agricultural estates in Sri Lanka. Tata Tea Inc. in the United States processed and marketed instant tea from its facility in Florida, based on the sourcing of instant tea products out of Munnar and Kerala. In 1993, they entered into a joint venture with Allied Lyons PLC in the UK to form Estate Tata Tetley.

In the mid-1990s, Tata Tea attempted to buy Tetley and the Lankan JVC acquired 51% shareholding in Watawala Plantations Ltd.

In 1997 the company was embroiled in a major scandal known as the "Tata Tapes controversy" which related to funds the company provided to the outlawed United Liberation Front of Assam (ULFA), an armed-struggle group operating in Assam.

By 1999, Tata Tea's brands had a combined market share of 25% in India. The company had 74 tea gardens and was producing 6.2 crore kilograms of tea a year, two-thirds of it packaged and branded. Towards the end of the year, the tea business was hit by a drought in much of India. In addition, Russia, once the largest buyer of Indian tea, temporarily withdrew from the market.

=== 2000 to 2010 ===
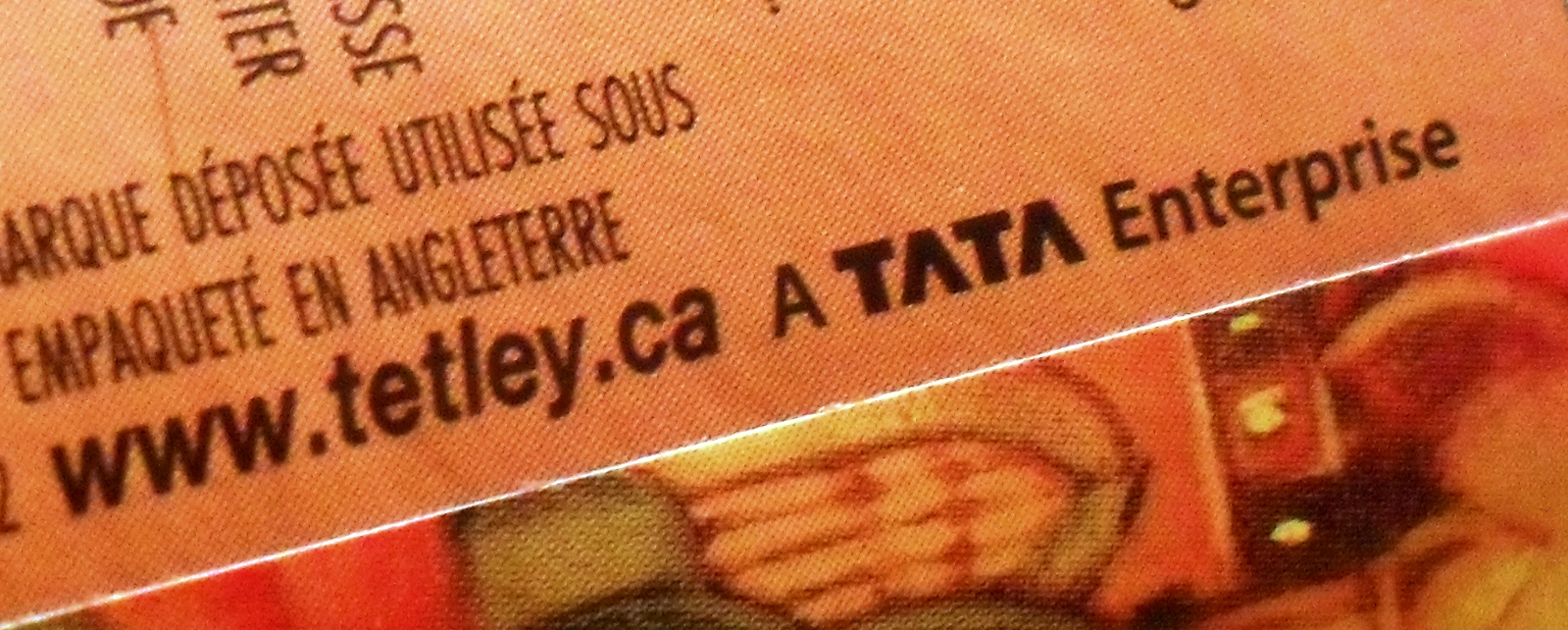
Tetley tea canister from Canada

Tata Tea acquired the Tetley Group (based in the United Kingdom) in 2000. It was a £271 million ($432 million) leveraged buyout. Tata Tea reportedly outbid the American conglomerate Sara Lee in what was described, at the time, as the largest takeover of a foreign company by an Indian company. At the time, Tetley was the world's second-largest tea company after Unilever's Brooke Bond-Lipton and had an annual turnover of £300 million. It was the market leader in Britain and Canada and a popular brand in the United States, Australia and the Middle East.

Established in 1837, Tetley was the first British tea company to introduce the tea bag to the UK in 1953. The tea bag was followed by the first round tea bag in 1989 and the 'no drip, no mess' drawstring bag in 1997. Tetley now contributes around two-thirds of the total turnover of Tata Tea.

From 2005, Tata Tea began a restructuring exercise to divest direct ownership of plantations in India, a process facilitated by subsidised loans from the World Bank's International Finance Corporation.

In 2006, Tata Tea acquired Eight O'Clock Coffee, a U.S.-based coffee producer from Gryphon Investors for $220m; before being sold to Gryphon, the Eight O'Clock Coffee brand was originally owned by The Great Atlantic & Pacific Tea Company from its beginnings in 1859 to 2003.

The international trade union IUF criticized the company in 2009 for not allowing statutory maternity leave to pregnant tea pluckers, and for locking out 1,000 workers on the Nowera Nuddy Tea Estate in West Bengal for so long that the local government began distributing food coupons for emergency rations to workers and their families. In May 2010, a crop sprayer died of suspected poisoning on a Tata estate in Assam, leading to protests at which two more workers were shot dead by riot police.

=== 2010 to 2019 ===
On 30 January 2012, Tata Consumer Products Limited and Starbucks announced the creation of a 50:50 joint venture called Tata Starbucks Limited, which will own and operate Starbucks outlets branded as Starbucks Coffee "A Tata Alliance" in India. The stores started operating in 2012, launching initially in Delhi and Mumbai. The coffee shops source coffee beans from Tata Coffee, a subsidiary company of Tata Consumer Products Limited.

=== 2019 to present ===
On 15 May 2019, Tata Chemicals Limited (TCL) announced the de-merger of the Consumer Products Business of TCL and into TGBL through a National Company Law Tribunal ("NCLT") approved scheme of arrangement ("Scheme") to become Tata Consumer. In the beverages business, Tata Consumer brands include Tata Tea, Tetley, Vitax, Eight O’Clock Coffee, Himalayan Natural Mineral Water, Grand Coffee and Joekels. In the food segment, the brands include Tata Salt and Tata Sampann.

Tata Global Beverages Limited (TGBL) and Tata Chemicals Limited (TCL) announced that the Scheme of Arrangement between TGBL and TCL regarding the Consumer Products Business of TCL is now operational, effective from 7 February 2020. Following this, TGBL has been renamed Tata Consumer Products Limited. Tata Consumer Products combines the food and beverages brands, which include Tata Salt, Tata Tea, Tata Sampann, Tetley, Soulfull and Himalayan mineral water, under a single umbrella.

Tata Consumer Products acquired complete control of Tata SmartFoodz Limited from Tata Industries Limited for ₹395 crore (US$41 million) on 12 November 2021.

On 1 May 2022, Tata Consumer Products announced that Tata Coffee would merge with itself as part of a reorganization plan. The company stated that the merger was expected to be completed in late 2023, with shareholders of Tata Coffee receiving 3 shares in Tata Consumer Products for every 10 shares of Tata Coffee. In July 2022, Tata Consumer Products launched premium honey products and flavoured preserves, under the company's Himalayan brand name. Also in July 2022, the company launched plant-based meat products under the brand name, Tata Simply Better.

In January 2024, Tata Consumer acquired Capital Foods (owner of Ching's Secret and Smith & Jones brands) for ₹5,100 crore and Organic India for ₹1,900 crore.

== Operations ==
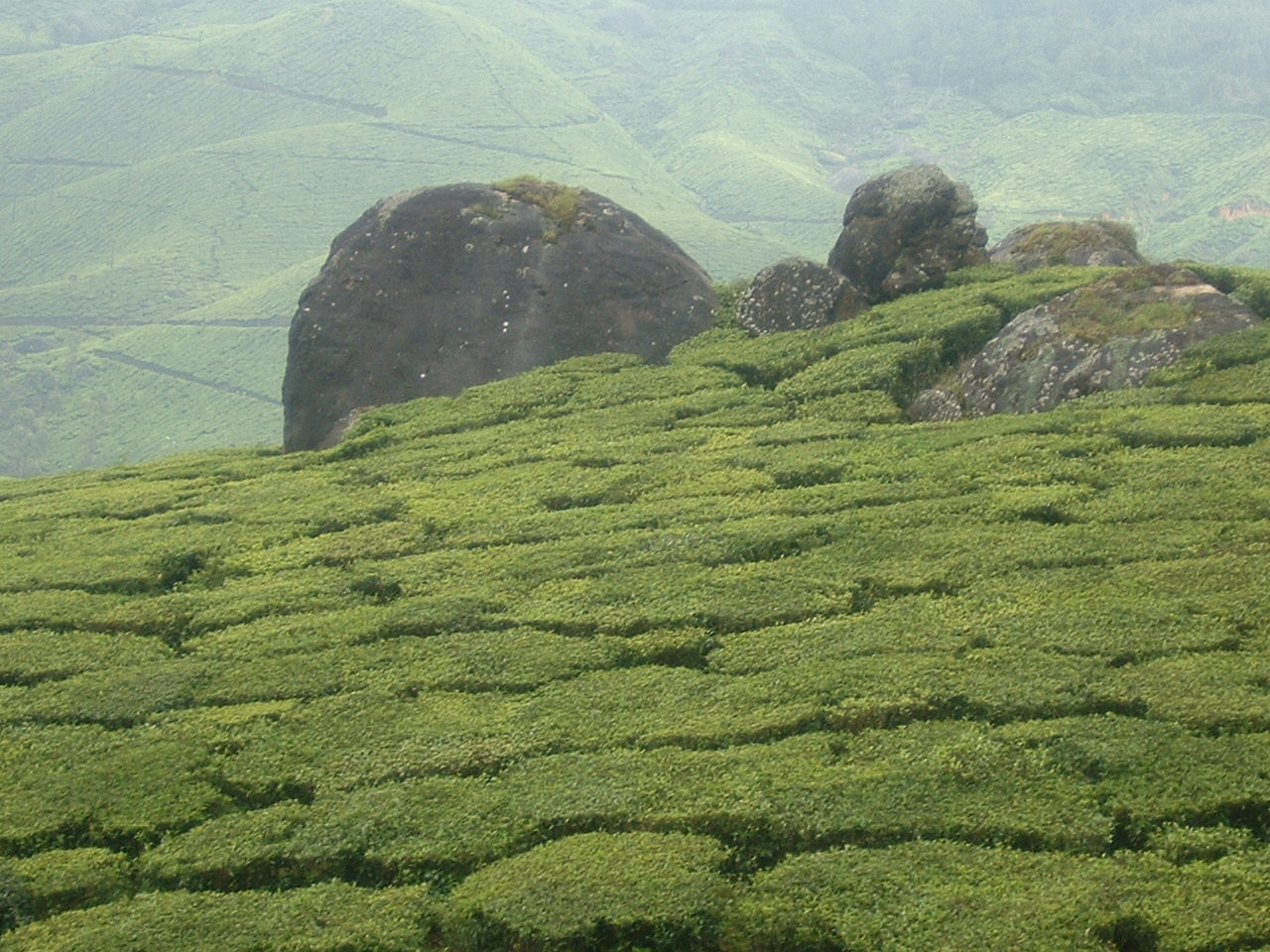
Tata's tea plantations in Munnar, India

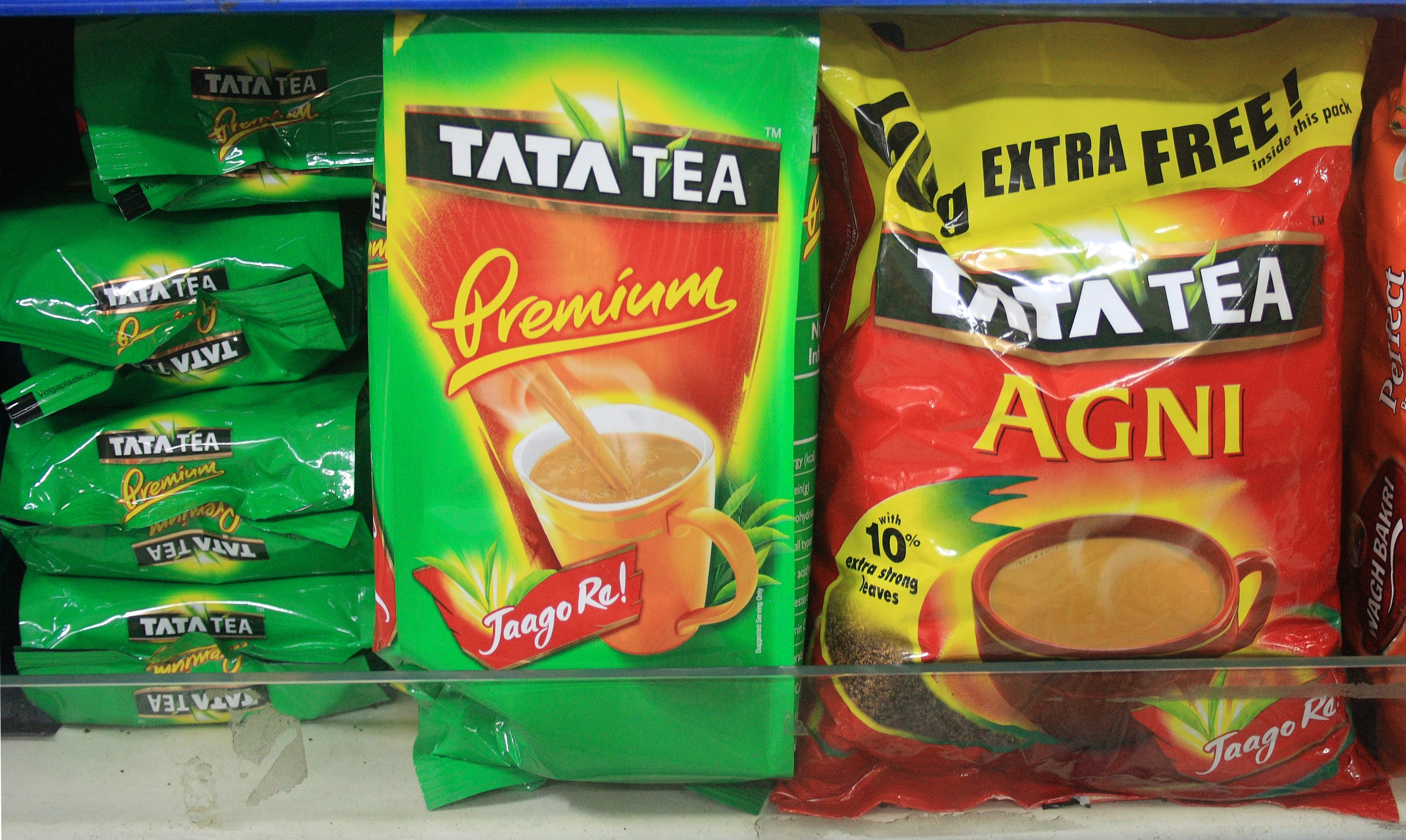
Packages of Tata Tea on a store shelf

The company was renamed as Tata Global Beverages (now Tata Consumer Products Limited) to include the range of health and nutritional beverages it wants to enter into. Via subsidiary companies, Tata Consumer Products Limited manufactures 7 crore kilograms of tea in India, controls 54 tea estates, ten tea blending and packaging factories and employs around 59,000 people. The company owns 51 tea estates in India and Sri Lanka, especially in Assam, West Bengal in eastern India and Kerala in the south. The company is the largest manufacturer of Assam tea and Darjeeling tea and the second-largest manufacturer of Ceylon tea.

Set up in 1964 as a joint venture with UK based James Finlay and Company to develop value-added tea, Tata Consumer Products Limited has now product and brand presence in 50 countries. It is one of India's first multinational companies. The operations of Tata Consumer Products Limited and its subsidiaries focus on branded product offerings in tea, but with a significant presence in plantation activity in India and Sri Lanka.

The consolidated worldwide branded tea business of Tata Consumer Products Limited contributes to around 86% of its consolidated turnover with the remaining 14 per cent coming from bulk tea, coffee and investment income. With an area of approximately 159 square kilometres (61 sq mi) under tea cultivation, Tata Consumer Products Limited produces around 30 million kg of black tea annually. Instant tea is used for light density 100% teas, iced tea mixes and in the preparation of ready-to-drink (RTD) beverages.

Tata Consumer Products Limited owns five brands in India: Tata Tea, Tetley, Kannan Devan, Chakra Gold, and Gemini. The company has a 100% export-oriented unit (KOSHER and HACCP certified) manufacturing instant tea in Munnar, Kerala, which is the largest such facility outside the United States. Tata Consumer Products Limited has subsidiaries in Australia, Great Britain, The United States of America, Czechia and India.

== Brands and products ==
Tea

- Tata Tea
- Good Earth Teas
- Tetley
- 1868 by Tata Tea
- Teapigs
- Vitax
- Organic India - Teas & infusions

Coffee

- Tata Coffee Grand
- Eight O'Clock Coffee
- Sonnets by Tata Coffee
- Tata Coffee Gold
- Tata Coffee Quick Filter
- Tata Coffee Cold Coffee

Liquid Beverage

- Tata Copper+
- Himalayan Natural Mineral Water
- Tata Gluco+
- Tata Fruski

Foods

- Tata Salt
- Ching's Secret
- Smith & Jones
- Tata Sampann

Herbal Supplements

- Organic India - Herbal supplements

== Social initiatives ==
=== Jaago Re! ===
Tata Global Beverages worked with Janaagraha on a voter registration drive, with the campaign name "Jaago Re!" ("Wake Up!"). Following this, the company moved the campaign on to opposing corruption. The Jaago Re! website encourages discussion on this and other social issues.

=== Scholarships ===
Tata Global Beverages awarded the Tata Global Beverages Re-imagination Scholarships on 17 March 2013 to eight students from the 'Urban Scholars' program at Brunel University in London. The participating students were required to write an essay based on the following topic "A hot cup of tea on a cold morning, sharing a joke over a cup of coffee, a sip of cool water after a long trek. Beverages are part of our everyday life and yet they also sprinkle some magic on it—moments of reflection, sharing, inspiration and laughter...moments that take us away from the ordinary. What do you think makes a magical beverage moment?"

== Criticism ==
In January 2014, Tata Consumer Products Limited and International Finance Corporation (IFC) which is part of World Bank were criticized for poor working conditions, low wages, and gross human rights violations in a report released by Human Rights Institute at Columbia Law School. The report alleges Amalgamated Plantations Private Limited (APPL) which is partly owned by Tata Tea and IFC is in violation of many of the provisions of the Indian Plantation Labor Act (PLA) on its tea plantations in Assam and West Bengal.

In March 2014 a documentary on The Guardian news website claims that Tata Global Beverages is underpaying the minimum Indian wage at an Assam tea plantation that Tata co-owns with Tetley and other major tea producers.

In October 2015, a movement of 6,000 female labourers calling themselves "Pempilai Orumai", or women's unity laid siege to the Munnar tea estates, one of Kerala's most popular tourist destinations and owned subsidiaries of Tata Tea's plantation in Kerala. Trade and tourism were brought to a near standstill but, after nine days of protest and marathon negotiations overseen by the chief minister of the state, it gave in.

The spark that ignited the protest was a decision to cut the 20% bonus paid to tea pickers, but its roots go much deeper than that. "Part of the women's complaint is that they live in one-bed huts without toilets and other basic amenities and, while they earn significantly more than the tea workers in Assam, they say the ₹230 (US$2.40) (£2.30) they are paid for a day's work is half what a daily wage labourer in Kerala would get."

== Shareholding pattern ==
The maximum stake is being held with Indian promoters of the business i.e., TATA Group with a percentage share of 33.55%. Mutual funds hold a 14.86% share and FPIs hold a 17.05% stake in the company. Non-institutional individuals hold a 20.38% share in the company.

Shareholders (as on 31 March 2024)	Shareholding
Promoter	33.55%
FIIs	25.46%
DIIs	17.39%
Government	0.01%
Public	23.59%
Total	100.0%

== See also ==
- History of tea in India
- Munnar Tea Museum
- Kanan Devan Hills Plantations Company
