= Ching's Secret =

Indian food company

- Type: Food
- Industry: Food Manufacture
- Genre: Indian Chinese cuisine
- Founded: 1996; 30 years ago
- Founder: Mr Ajay Gupta
- Headquarters: Mumbai, India
- Products: Masalas, Instant Soups, Premium Soups, Instant Noodles, Sauces and chutneys, Schezwan Chutney, Hakka Noodles, Snacky Oats and Frozen Entrees.
- Parent: Tata Consumer Products
- Website: www.chingssecret.com

Ching's Secret is a food brand founded in 1996 by Capital Foods and based in Mumbai, India. The Ching's Secret range of food products and ingredients include noodles, soups, sauces, masalas and chutneys. In 2024, Capital Foods was acquired by Tata Consumer Products for around ₹5,200 crore in an all-cash deal.

== History ==
In 1995, Mr. Ajay Gupta launched Capital Foods. Drawing on his marketing experience, he scouted the food market to identify profitable niches and homed in on Ching’s Secret, a brand that would offer Chinese food ingredients. He followed this up with Smith & Jones, a brand that would offer international foods and food ingredients.

Ching’s Secret debuted the staple trilogy of Chinese sauces - Soy Sauce, Red Chilli Sauce, Green Chilli Sauce. This was followed up with an offering of noodles, dubbed as Hakka Noodles in India. In August, 2015, the company established the category of Desi Chinese, an Indo-Chinese fusion cuisine.

== Controversy ==
On 15 June 2015, a newspaper report stated that Ching's Secret noodles had failed a quality test administered by a government agency. The agency had then initiated court proceedings against the company, "for selling products that were found with hazardous chemicals". To save face, the company produced Ranveer Ching Returns.

== See also ==
- List of instant noodle brands
