= Good Earth Tea =

American tea company

- Type: Subsidiary
- Industry: Tea distribution
- Founded: 1972
- Headquarters: Montvale, New Jersey
- Products: Teas & herbal teas
- Parent: Tata Consumer Products
- Website: www.goodearth.com

Good Earth Tea is a tea and herbal tea company. Founded in 1972 under the name Fmali Herb Company and based in Santa Cruz, California, it was one of the first American herbal tea companies during the early 1970s. In the late 1970s, it began to develop trademark teas for Good Earth Restaurants, and launched Good Earth teas in tea bag form to the California grocery market in 1988.

The company has since evolved to include a wide range of teas made with natural ingredients that span all sorts of varietals, herbs, botanicals and flavors.

== Company ==
Good Earth was acquired by Tetley US Holdings Limited in October 2005, which is a subsidiary of Tata Global Beverages. In January 2011, Tata relocated Good Earth from California to New Jersey. During 2011 and 2012, Good Earth Tea launched the "Tag, You're It Contest", a nationwide contest offering fans a chance to submit an original, thought-provoking quote to be used on the tea tags of the brand's flavorful blends.

In November 2013, Tata Global Beverages rebranded Good Earth to diversify it in the competitive tea market. The new "Untamed Tea" brand message and marketing strategy redesigned the brand's website, launched extensive social media outreach, and a celebrity chef partnership. It also included new flavors with new taste profiles, some with stevia, and discontinued older flavors.

In January 2014, Good Earth Tea collaborated with celebrity chef Elizabeth Falkner from Bravo's Top Chef. Falkner's adventurous palate led to the creation of recipes infused with Good Earth Tea.

Good Earth produced over 40 different blends of tea, now concentrating on 14 unique teas. Good Earth teas are available in natural and organic varieties.
