= History of tea in India =

Overview of the history of tea and its production in India

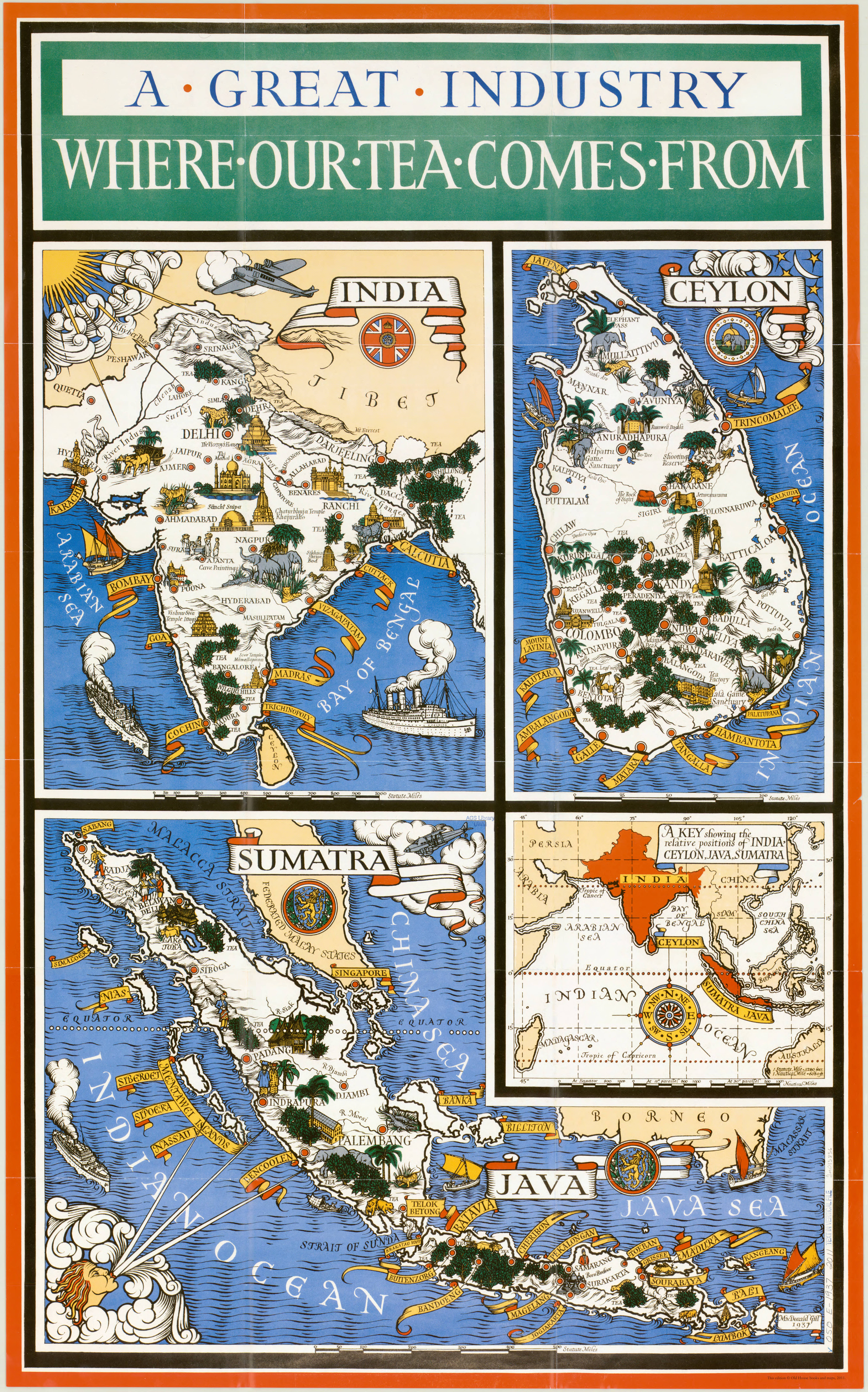
1930s map depicting Britain's main tea suppliers in the early twentieth century.

India is one of the largest tea producers in the world, although over 70 percent of its tea is consumed within India itself. A number of renowned tea varieties, such as Assam and Darjeeling, are grown exclusively in India. The Indian tea industry has evolved to own many global tea brands and is one of the most technologically equipped tea industries in the world. All facets of the tea trade in India, including tea production, certification and exportation, are controlled by the Tea Board of India.

== Colonial beginnings ==
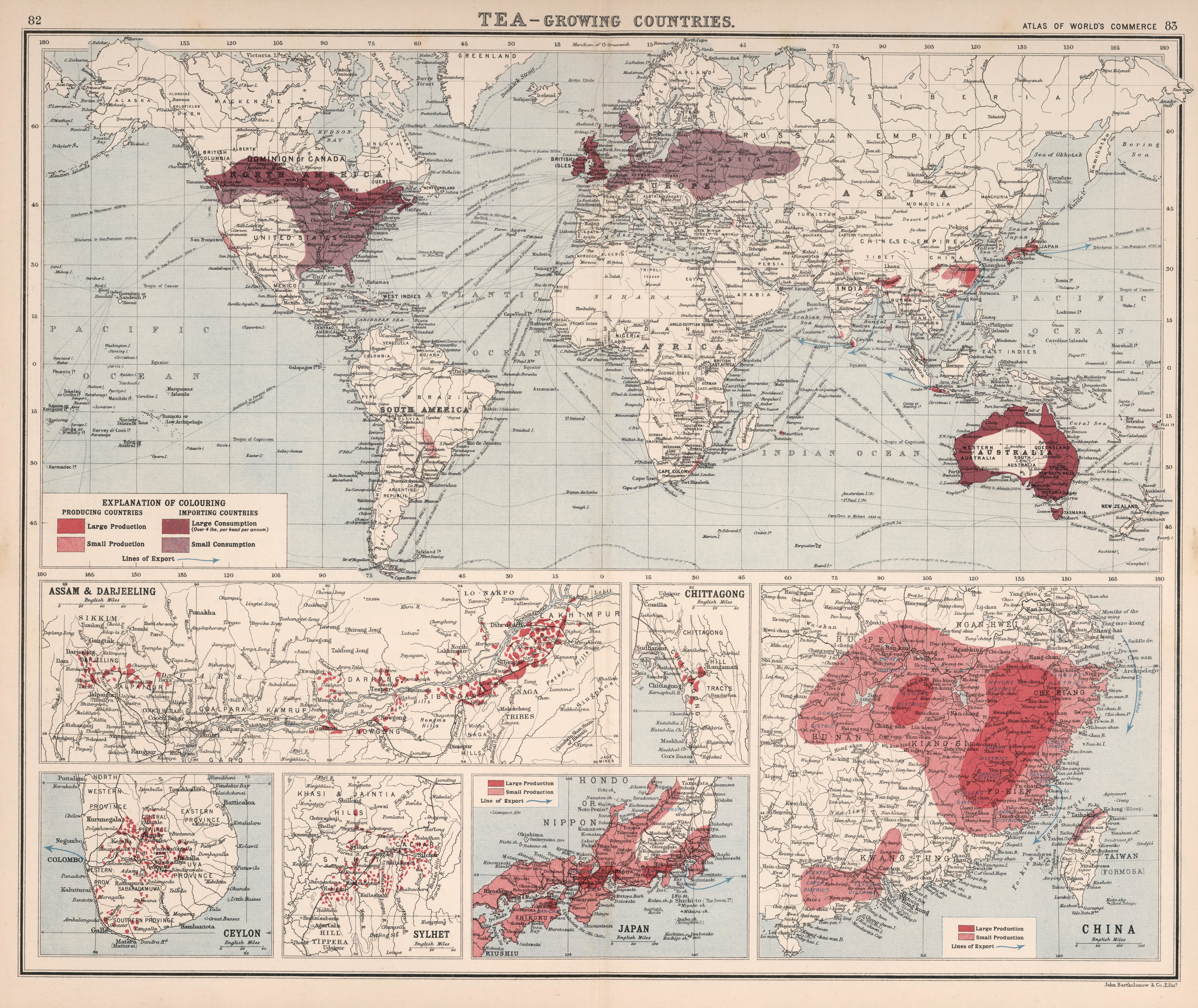
Indian tea on global supply as of early twentieth century.

The British East India Company began large-scale production of tea in Assam in the early 1820s. The first tea crops grown there were of a variety traditionally brewed by the Singpho people. In 1826, the East India Company took over control of the region in the Treaty of Yandabo. In 1837, the first British tea garden was established at Chabua in Upper Assam; in 1840, the Assam Tea Company was established, and it began the commercial production of tea in the region. Beginning in the 1850s, the tea industry rapidly expanded, consuming huge tracts of land for tea plantations. By the turn of the century, Assam became the leading tea-producing region in the world. Tea became widely grown in India as both a cash crop and monocrop; academic Nayantara Arora argued that the emergence of the tea industry in India as a result of British rule led to the transformation of Indian subsistence farmers into industrial agriculturalists whose economic self-suffiency was reduced in favor of market dependence.

In India, the semi-medicinal use of tea brew was noted in 1662 by Mendelslo:

At our ordinary meetings every day we took only thay, which is commonly used all over the Indies, not only among those of the country, but also among the Dutch and the English, who take it as a drug that cleanses the stomach, and digests the superfluous humours, by a temperate heat particular thereto. — Indian Food A Historical Companion by Achaya KT.

In 1689, John Ovington similarly observed that tea (grown in China) was taken by the Banias in Surat (and indeed "all the Inhabitants of India") with hot spices and either sugar-candy or conserved lemons and that this tea was used against headache, gravel and griping in the guts. In pre-colonial times in the Indian subcontinent, tea was used for medicinal purposes and would grow wild; the practice of drinking tea daily and having it be an aspect of social status in Indian culture was entirely a result of British colonial influences.

While experimenting to introduce tea in India, the British noticed that tea plants with thicker leaves also grew in Assam, and these, when planted in India, responded very well. The same plants had long been cultivated by the Singpho people, and chests of tea were supplied by the tribal ruler Ningroola to the British. The Assamese and Chinese varieties have been regarded in the past as different related species, but are now usually classified by botanists as the same species, Camellia sinensis.

The introduction of Chinese tea plants to India is commonly credited to Robert Fortune, who spent about two and a half years, from 1848 to 1851, in China working on behalf of the Royal Horticultural Society of London. Fortune employed many different means to steal tea plants and seedlings, which were regarded as the property of the Chinese empire. He also used Nathaniel Bagshaw Ward's portable Wardian cases to sustain the plants. Using these small greenhouses, Fortune introduced 20,000 tea plants and seedlings to the Darjeeling region of India, on steep slopes in the foothills of the Himalayas, with the acid soil liked by Camellia plants. He also brought a group of trained Chinese tea workers who would facilitate the production of tea leaves. Except for a few plants that survived in established Indian gardens, most of the Chinese tea plants Fortune introduced to India perished. The technology and knowledge that was brought over from China was instrumental in the later flourishing of the Indian tea industry using Chinese varieties, especially Darjeeling tea, which continues to use Chinese strains.

The tea industry in British India mostly employed indentured laborers, often referred to as "coolies", to work on large plantations. Although these were in theory willing recruits, in practise many laborers were coerced or tricked by recruiters to come and work on the plantations. The majority of indentured laborers on Indian tea plantations were women, as tea cutting was seen as "women’s work", though they received less pay than male laborers despite often being coerced into producing more. Indian writer Mulk Raj Anand described the tea industry in colonial India as "The hunger, the sweat and the despair of a million Indians!"

From the outset, Indian-grown tea proved extremely popular among British consumers, both for its greater strength, and for its cheaper price. Tea had been a high-status drink when first introduced, but had steadily fallen in price and increased in popularity among the working class. The temperance movement in Britain massively promoted tea consumption from the early 19th century onwards as an alternative to beer. Water used to make beer was of dubious quality, but the complete boiling necessary for tea rendered it safer. Many men in particular found China tea insipid, and the greater strength and lower price of Indian teas appealed greatly. By the last quarter of the nineteenth century, big brands such as Lyons, Liptons and Mazawattee dominated the market. Tea was the dominant drink for all classes during the Victorian era, with working-class families often doing without other foods in order to afford it. This meant the potential market for Indian teas was vast. Indian tea (effectively including Ceylon tea from Sri Lanka) soon came to be the "norm", with Chinese tea a minority taste. Until the 1970s and the rise of instant coffee, Indian tea had almost sole command of the hot drinks market. Its rivals were cocoa, coffee and savory drinks such as Bovril and Oxo. In recent decades, Asian tea has lost much ground in the cheaper end of European markets to tea from Africa, especially Kenyan tea.

Tea was important during India's struggle for independence. Gandhi urged people to boycott British goods, including tea, because of poor working conditions. Advertisers also promoted tea as a patriotic drink. After independence, tea became a symbol of unity and was owned by Indians.

The introduction of CTC (Crush, Tear, Curl) tea processing has been important in the Indian tea industry due to its efficiency and consistency.

== Modern tea industry ==
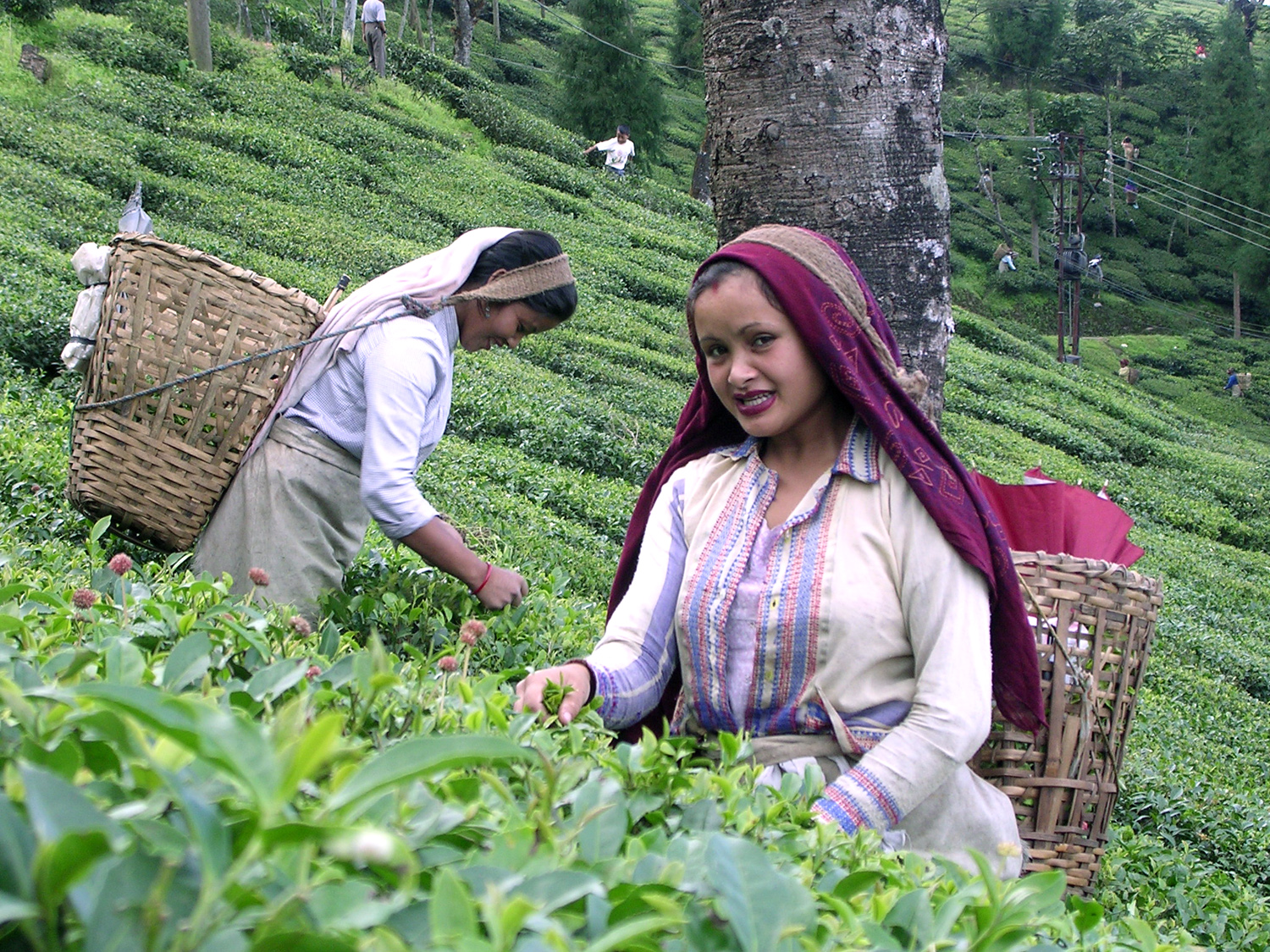
Darjeeling tea estate women tea pickers. The majority of tea pickers around the world are women.

India's tea industry is the fourth largest in the world, producing $709,000,000 worth of tea. As of 2013 the consumption of green tea in India was growing by over 50% a year. The major tea-producing states in India are: Assam, West Bengal, Tamil Nadu, Tripura, Arunachal Pradesh, Himachal Pradesh, Karnataka, Kerala, Sikkim, Nagaland.

The expansion of the tea industry since the early 2000s has come at enormous cost to the local communities, farmers, and the land. Corporations like Tetley, Typhoo, Camellia, TATA, Unilever, Taj, and others have been buying out small tea growers and family-run farms. Their tea production has followed Green Revolution methods, putting growth and profit over the lives of cultivators and the health of the soil. The term "neoliberal corporatization" has been used to describe these methods. Although by the 1980s, tea farms and most of the agricultural land was owned by Indians who took over the British plantations post-independence, Western and Green Revolution influences shifted the tea industry from smaller farms to large corporations. Indian-owned tea corporations are supported by the World Bank and the IMF.

India’s tea industry is a lucrative business, and there is especially a global demand for Assam black tea. For example, since 2006, the TATA corporation has been buying up small farms in Assam with the support of a $7 billion investment from the World Bank. By 2010, they owned 24 farms in Assam and Northeast India. TATA has several workers' rights abuse allegations against them, as they do not have protective measures for their farmers when spraying chemicals, they pay low wages, and demand long working hours. In 2014, TATA’s tea company was in the news for worker’s rights abuses and trafficking of young girls. The present-day tea industry in India is growing increasingly dominated by corporations to meet global demands.

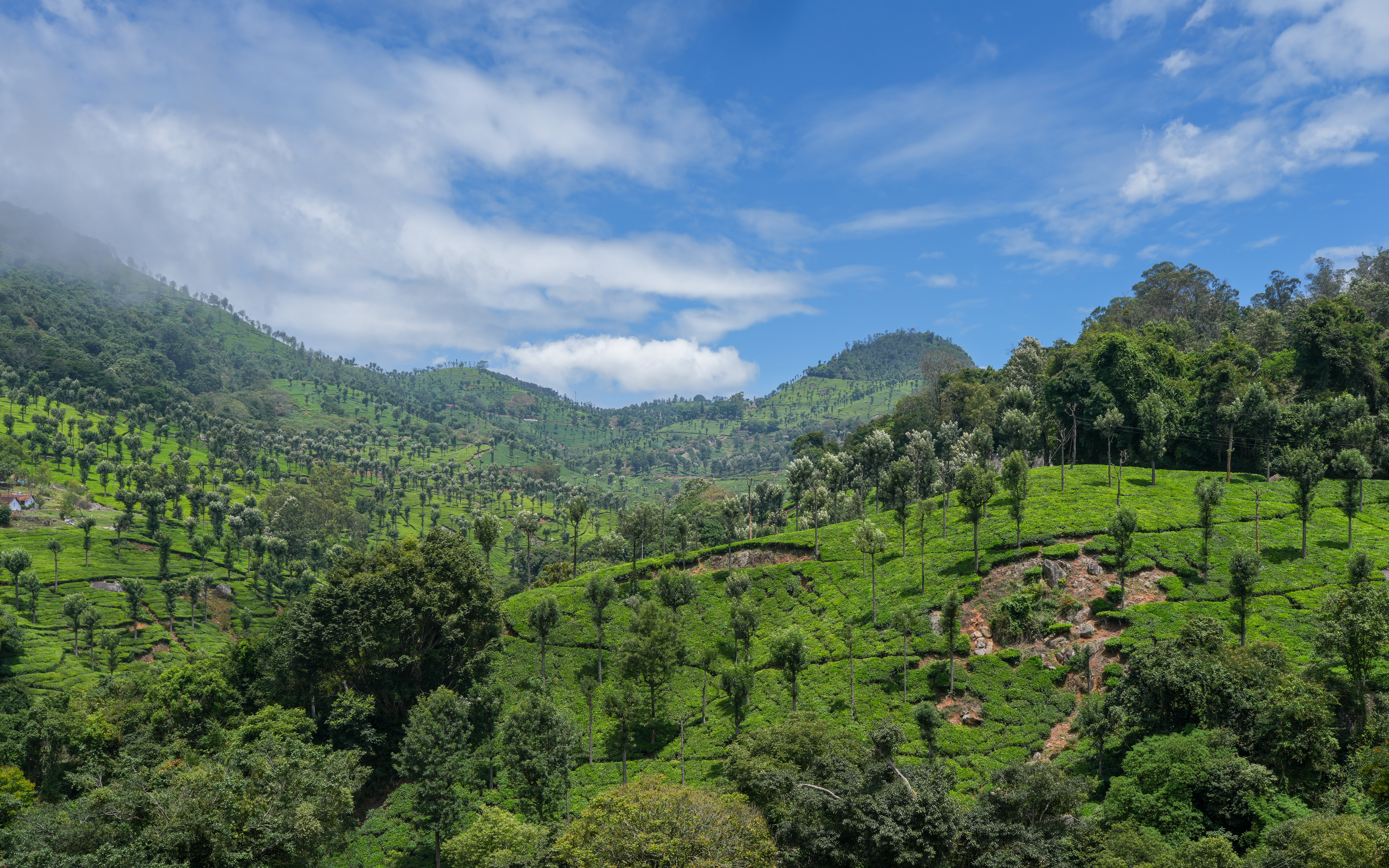
Tea plantation in the Nilgiris

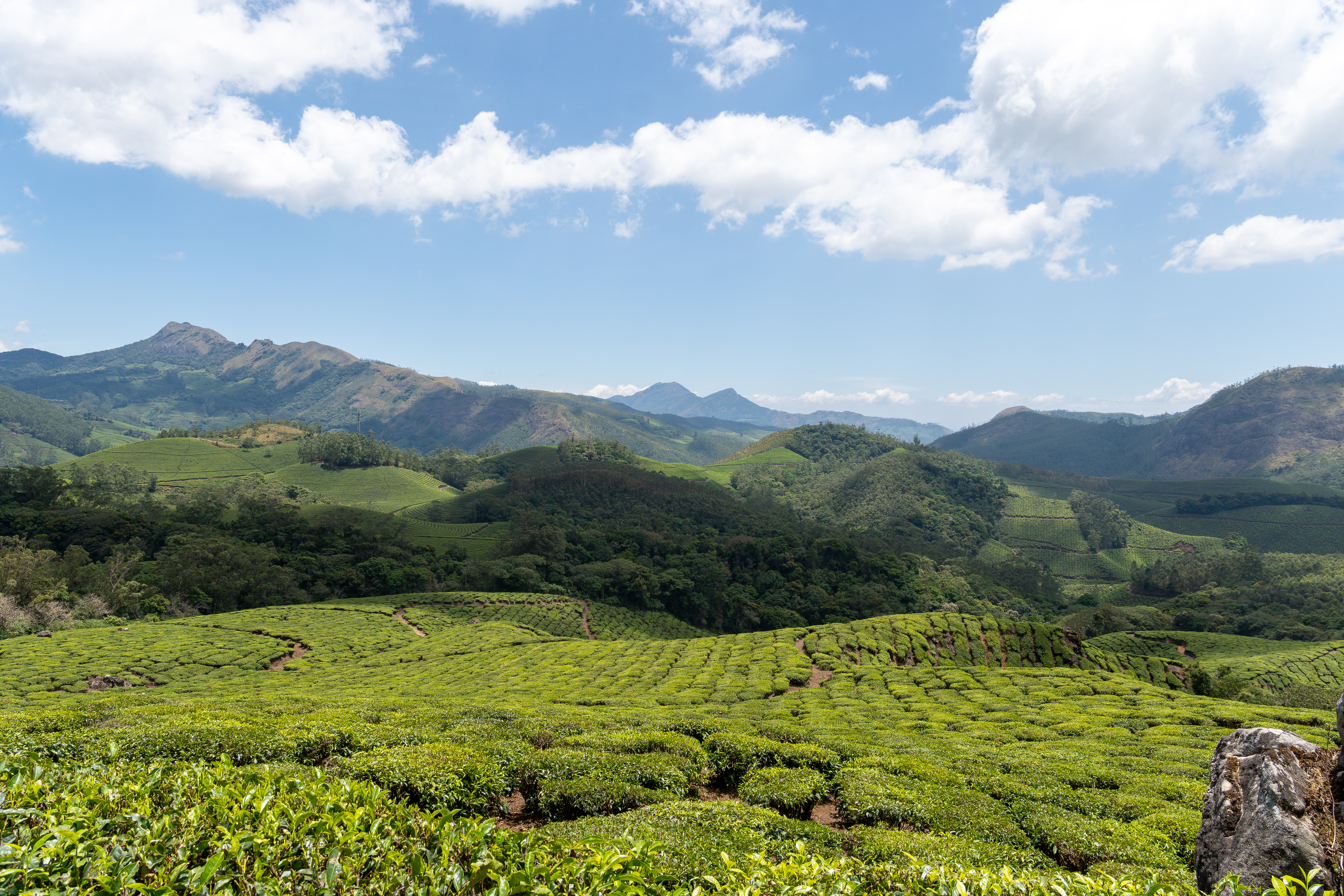
Tea plantations in Munnar, Kerala

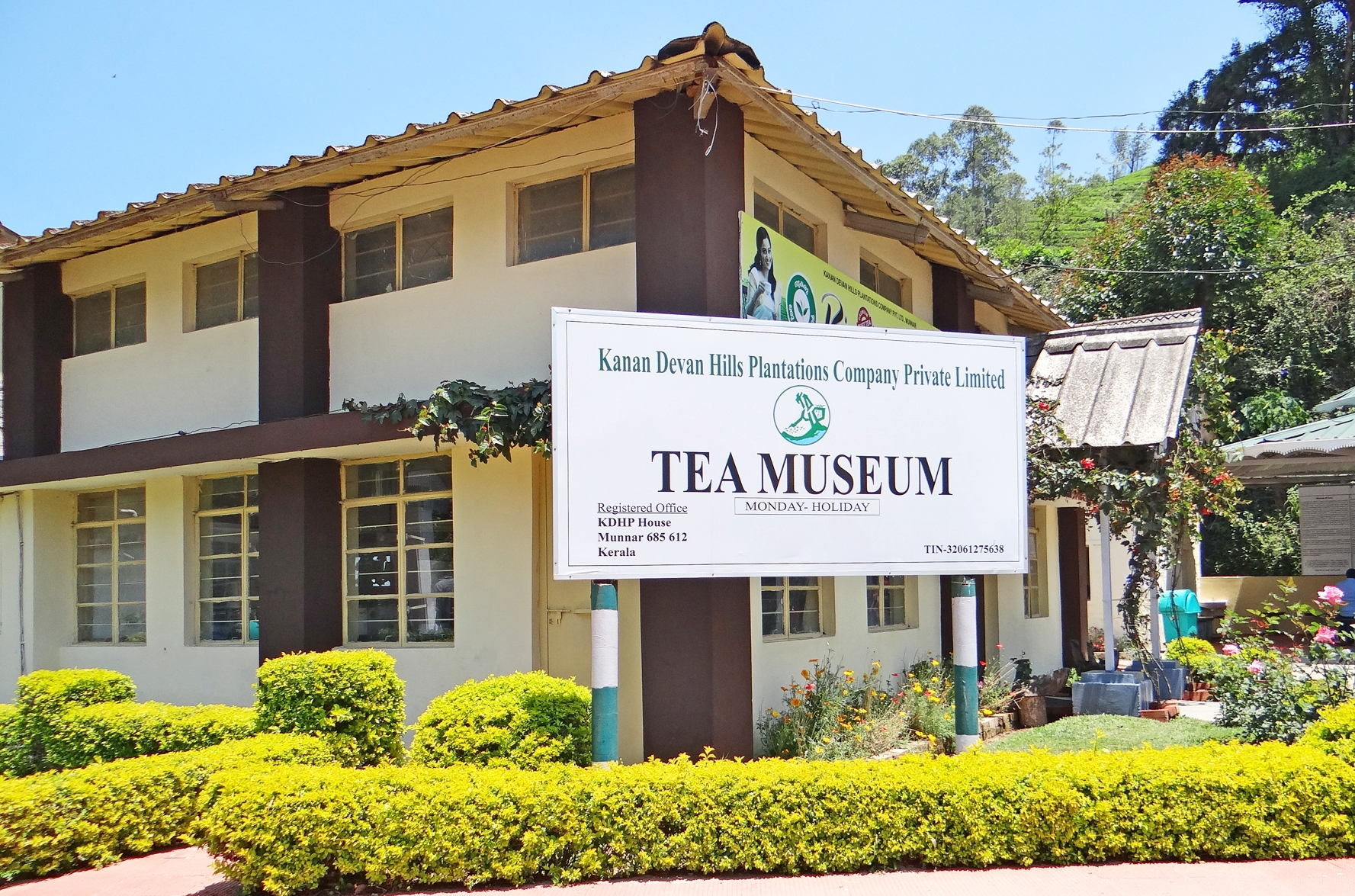
Tata Tea Museum in Munnar

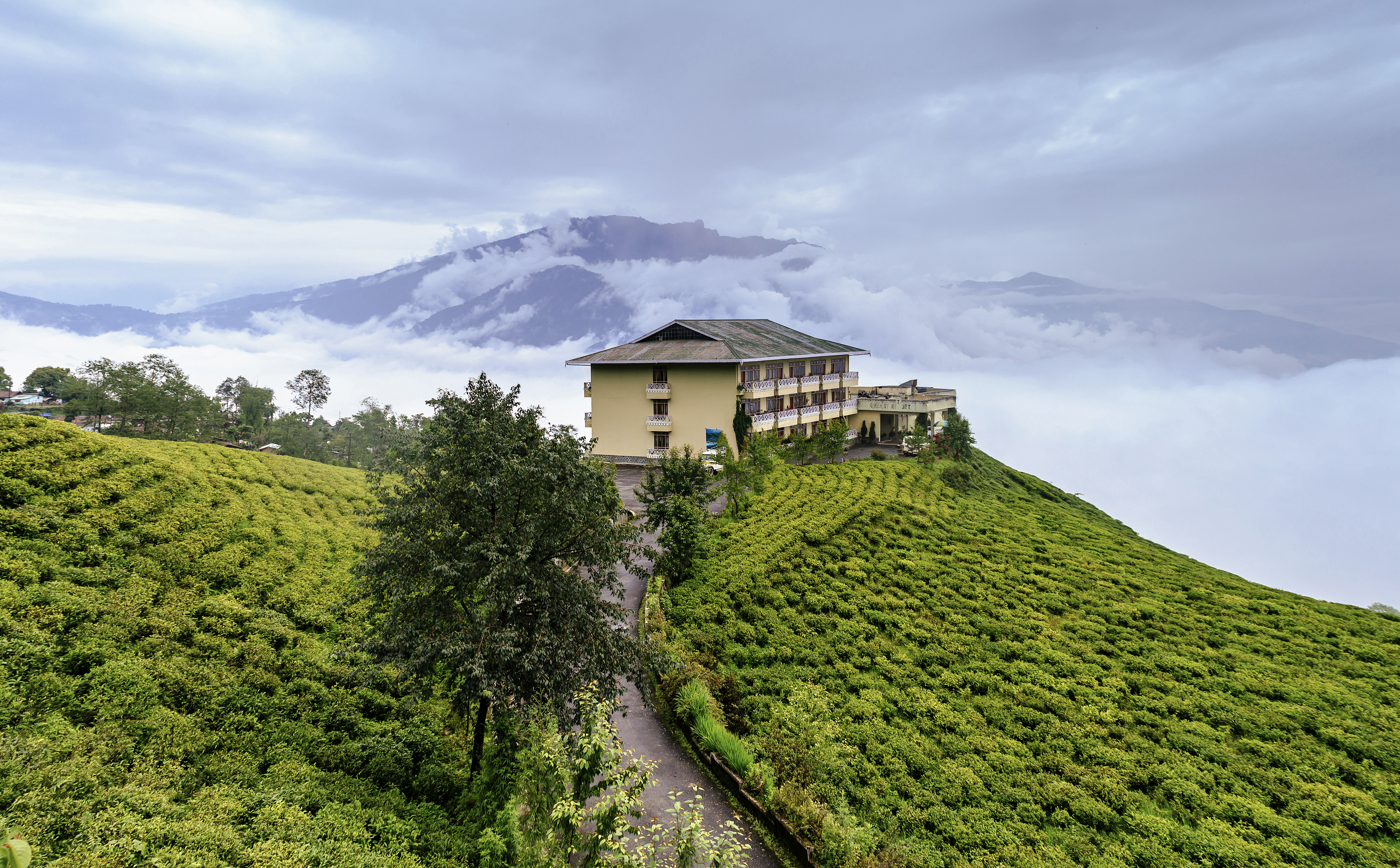
Cherry Resort inside Temi Tea Garden, Namchi, Sikkim

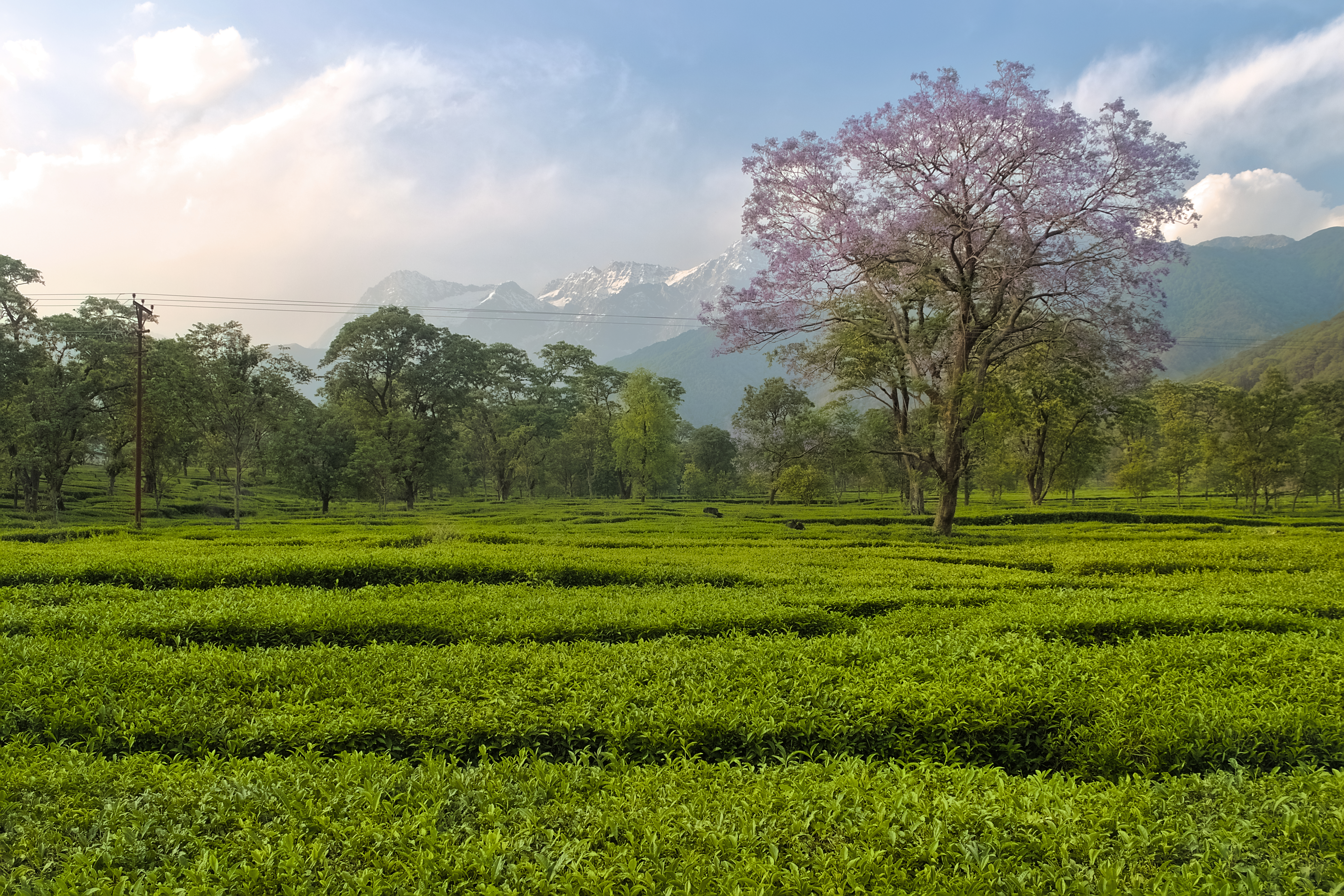
Kangra tea plantation near Palampur, Himachal Pradesh

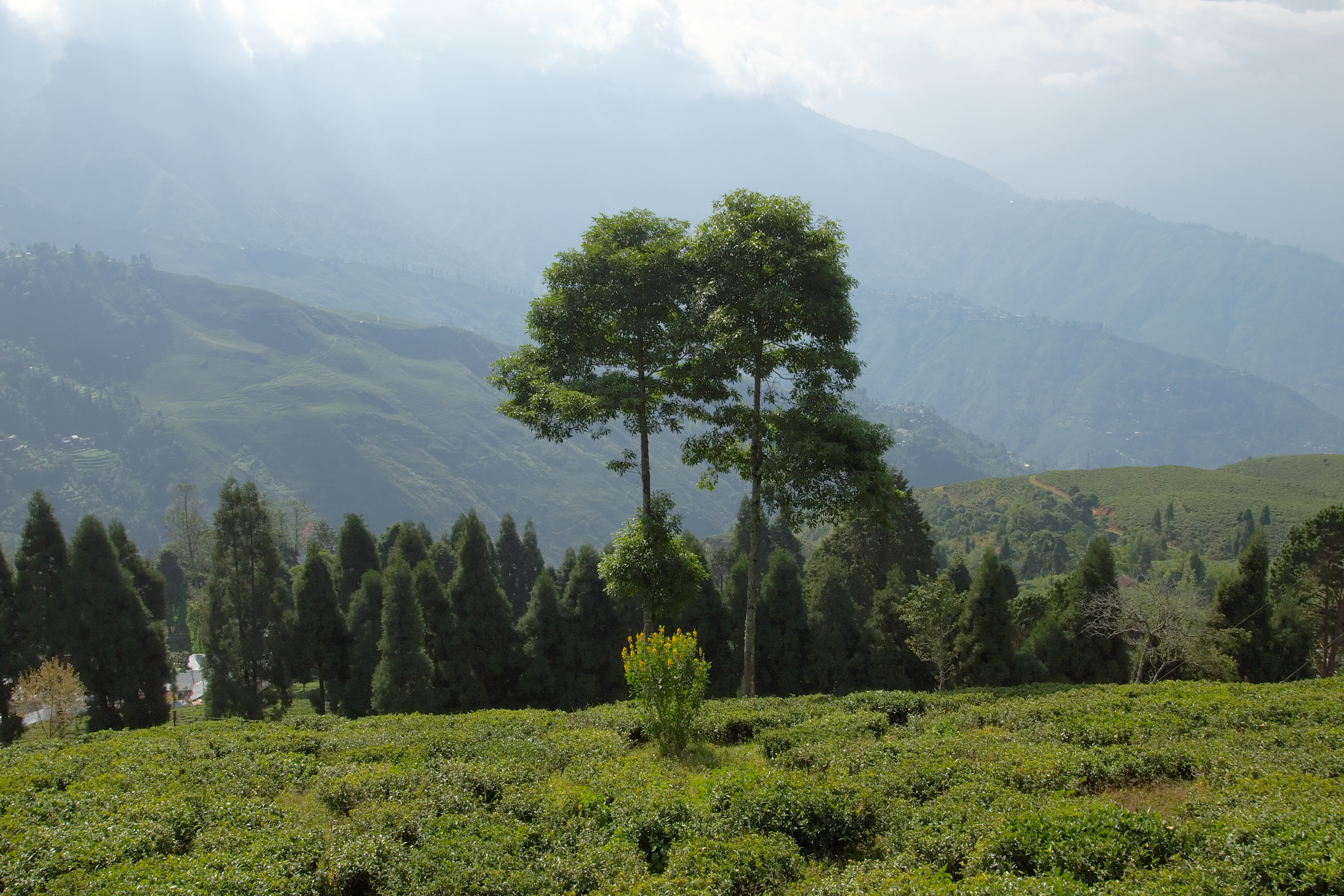
Darjeeling tea plantations on hills, Darjeeling

== Government and the Indian tea industry ==
The Indian tea industry as a mass employer has enjoyed the attention of the Indian government. When export sales went down, the government was sympathetic to the demand of the industry and its cultivators. It has passed resolutions supporting the industry domestically and has also lobbied extensively with organizations like the WTO internationally.

The Indian administration along with the European Union and six other countries (Brazil, Chile, Japan, South Korea and Mexico) filed a complaint with the WTO against the Byrd Amendment, which was formally known as the Continued Dumping and Subsidy Offset Act of 2000 legislated by the US. The essence of this act was that non-US firms that sell below cost price in the US could be fined and the money is given to the US companies who made the complaint in the first place. The act adversely affected the commodities business of the complainant states and has since been repealed after WTO ruled the act to be illegal.

Furthermore, the Indian government took cognizance of the changed tea and coffee market and set up an Inter-Ministerial Committee (IMC) to look into their problems in late 2003. The IMC has recommended that the government share the financial burden of the plantation industry on account of welfare measures envisaged for plantation workers mandated under the Plantation Labor Act 1951. Moreover, IMC has recommended to introducing means so that the agricultural income tax levied by the state governments can be slashed and the tea industry be made competitive. It has recommended that sick or bankrupt plantation estates should be provided with an analogous level of relaxation for similarly placed enterprises/estates as are available to industries referred to BIFR.

A Special Tea Term Loan (STTL) for the tea sector was announced by the Indian government in 2004. It envisaged restructuring of irregular portions of the outstanding term/working capital loans in the tea sector with repayment over five to seven years and a moratorium of one year, which was to be on a case to case basis for large growers. The STTL also provides for working capital up to Rs. 2 lakhs at a rate not exceeding 9% to small growers.

In addition to these measures, the Tea Board plans to launch a new marketing initiative, which will include a foray into new markets such as Iran, Pakistan, Vietnam and Egypt. It also plans to renew its efforts in traditional markets like Russia, the UK, Iraq and UAE. Noteworthy is its intent to double tea exports to Pakistan within a year.

Assam Orthodox Tea is set to receive the Geographical Indications (GI) exclusivity. A GI stamp identifies a certain product as emanating from the territory of a WTO member or region or locality in that territory, where a given quality, reputation or other characteristic of the good is essentially attributable to its geographic origin.

Darjeeling Tea also has its Geographical Indication (GI) registered in India in 2004 in India, in the European Union in 2007, and in other countries as well. The Darjeeling logo was registered in 1999 by the Tea Board of India in India.

The Cabinet Committee on Economic Affairs set up the Special Purpose Tea Fund (SPTF) under the Tea Board on December 29, 2006. The aim is to fund the replantation and rejuvenation (R&R) programm. In the same year, Tata Tea agreed to take over Jemca, which controls a 26 percent market share in the Czech Republic.

The CCEA gave its approval for pegging the subsidy at 25 percent and adopting a funding pattern of 25 percent promoter's contribution, 25 percent subsidy from the government and 50 percent loan from the SPTF. Banks have also been instructed to increase the lending period to over 13 years.

Beginning in 2013, the Union Ministry of Commerce and Industry has been actively promoting the sale of tea in the country's top five export markets for that product: Egypt, Iran, Kazakhstan, Russia, and the United States.

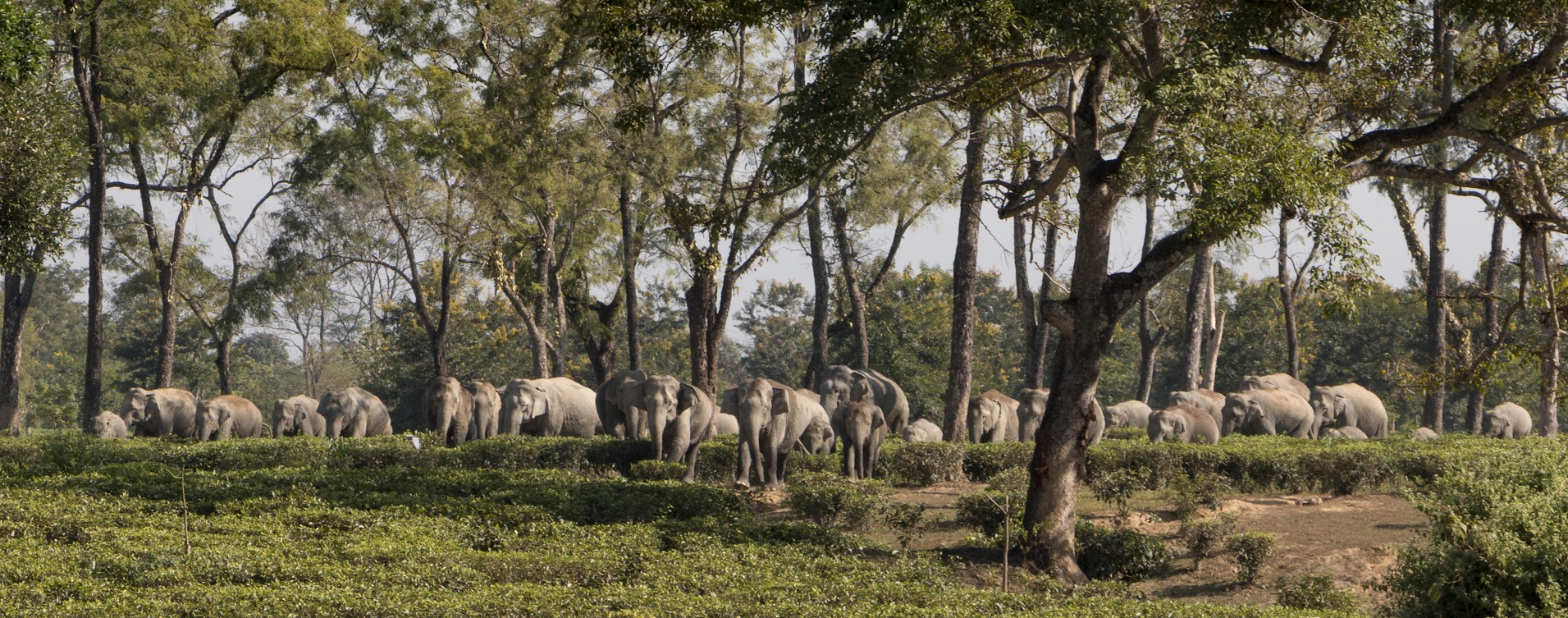
A herd of wild elephants in an elephant-friendly tea garden in India

== Separate time zone ==
Tea gardens in Assam do not follow the Indian Standard Time (IST), which is the time observed throughout India and Sri Lanka. The local time in Assam's tea gardens, known as "Tea Garden Time" or Bagantime, is an hour ahead of the IST. The system was introduced during British days because of the early sunrise in this part of the country.

By and large, the system has subsequently been successful in increasing the productivity of tea garden workers as they save on daylight by finishing the work during the daytime, and vice versa. Working time for tea laborers in the gardens is generally between 9 a.m. (IST 8 a.m.) to 5 p.m. (IST 4 p.m.) It may vary slightly from garden to garden.

Film maker Jahnu Barua has been campaigning for a separate time zone for the north-east region.

== In popular culture ==
Sagina Mahato, a 1970 Bengali film, directed by Tapan Sinha, deals with labor rights in the tea plantations in the Northeast during the British Raj.

Paradesi (English: Vagabond) is a 2013 Indian Tamil drama film written and directed by Bala. The film is based on real-life incidents that took place before independence in the 1930s, especially in southern tea estates.

== See also ==
- Indian Tea Association
- Indian tea culture
- Tocklai Experimental Station
- List of trade unions in Indian tea gardens
