= Good Earth (restaurant chain) =

American natural foods restaurant chain

Good Earth was a natural foods restaurant chain and bakery originally founded in Reno, Nevada, by William Galt and Nancy Galt. Murray Horton approached William to expand his deli into restaurants. Murray and Charlotte Horton worked with the Galts to grow the restaurants in the Bay Area. The Hortons owned Good Earth Restaurants and Bakeries as well as some Good Earth Delis in Palo Alto, San Mateo, Santa Clara, Cupertino and Los Gatos. They owned and operated these restaurants until they retired in the early 2000s. The Galts sold the concept to General Mills in 1980. After expansion to more than 50 locations across the United States, the concept lost popularity. General Mills converted most of the restaurants into other chain restaurants they were operating, such as Red Lobster and Olive Garden.

During the period in which Good Earth operated widely, it was "probably the most prominent chain example of a health-food concept", according to industry trade journal Nation's Restaurant News. Many of the chain's recipes were developed by Tony Santa Elena and can be found in his cookbook Good Food.

It was based in California at the time of the purchase by General Mills. Most of the restaurants were in California, with several throughout Greater Los Angeles and others in the San Francisco Bay Area. Franchise locations in Santa Barbara, California, Berkeley, California, and San Francisco, California were owned by Dean Stanley Ashby and family (wife Georgia Anne Ashby, and sons Aaron Stanley Ashby and Dean Stanley Ashby II).

The popular tea served with meals and sold in bulk and packaged form to customers by the restaurants is still sold under the Good Earth brand as Good Earth Teas.

Operating under the ownership of Parasole Restaurant Holdings, two restaurants remain in Minnesota; they are located in the Twin Cities suburbs of Edina and Roseville.
