= Ranveer Ching Returns =

2016 short film by Rohit Shetty

- Poster
- Directed by: Rohit Shetty
- Written by: Rajesh Narasimhan
- Produced by: Aditya Chopra; George Cameron
- Starring: Ranveer Singh; Tamannaah Bhatia
- Cinematography: Jomon T. John
- Edited by: Bunty Nagi
- Music by: Shankar–Ehsaan–Loy
- Production companies: Yash Raj Films; Rohit Shetty Picturez
- Distributed by: Capital Food
- Release date: 19 August 2016
- Running time: 5 minutes
- Country: India
- Language: Hindi

Ranveer Ching Returns is a 2016 Indian Hindi-language short action comedy film directed by Rohit Shetty, serving as an advertisement for the food brand Ching's Secret. The film stars Ranveer Singh and Tamannaah Bhatia.

== Plot ==
A man lands in a place where people are suffering from food shortage and helps them to fight hunger with Ching's Chinese products.

== Cast ==
- Ranveer Singh in a dual role as
  - Ranveer Ching
  - Maa Ching
- Tamannaah Bhatia as Ranveer Ching's love interest
- Naushad Abbas
- Pradeep

== Production ==
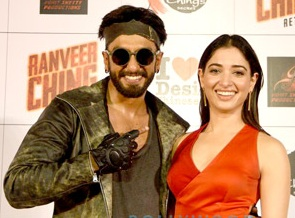
Ranveer Singh & Tamannaah Bhatia during promotions

In May 2016, Rohit Shetty revealed that he was going to direct a new film with Ranveer Singh and Tamannaah Bhatia. But later he revealed that it was not a full-length film and officially announced that it was a short film for about 6 minutes (Approximately). In July 2016, The leading actors confirmed that the shooting was completed and titled as Ranveer Ching Returns.

== Marketing ==
The film's advertising and promotion budget was ₹75 crore (US$7.8 million), equivalent to that of a mid-size Hindi film.

== Release ==
Ranveer Ching Returns was officially released on 19 August 2016 in most cinemas and YouTube.

== See also ==
- Ching's Secret
