= Tata Salt =

Indian brand of salt

- Type: Subsidiary
- Industry: FMCG, Food
- Founded: 1983; 43 years ago
- Headquarters: Tata Chemicals Ltd, Bombay House, Mumbai
- Area served: All over india
- Key people: Natarajan Chandrasekaran (Chairman); R. Mukundan (Managing Director)
- Products: Vacuum evaporated salt
- Brands: Tata Salt
- Parent: Tata Consumer Products
- Website: Official Website

Tata Salt was launched in 1983 by Tata Chemicals as India's first packaged iodised salt brand. The brand is now the biggest packaged salt brand in India, with a market share of 17%.

== The Indian salt market ==
As of June 2019, more than 90 thousand metric tonnes of Tata Salt is sold through over 65 lakh retail outlets reaching 161 million households across the country each month.

The market for packaged iodized salt and other salts in India is estimated to be worth Rs. 21.7 billion, with Tata Salt commanding a sales share of Rs 3.74 billion or 17.3% of the market. Domestic competitors include Ankur, Annapurna, Sarbu, Captain Cook, i-shakti, Nirma Shudh and Aashirvaad. However major competition is only given by Ankur salt which holds the second largest market share after Tata Salt. There are lot of players in the Indian market especially in the south India, In South India S.K.S.C.NADARAJAN & BROR. is one of the oldest organization in the salt industry active since 1942, They are known for transporting salt through bulk cargo trains from Tuticorin to West Bengal This bulk cargo train was entirely dedicated for transporting Salt from Tuticorin to the East coast.

== Products ==
TATA salt is sold in two types of packing:

1. Multilayer Laminate Pouch
2. Jars (PET & Glass)

TATA salt produces four different types of salt:

1. TATA salt plus
2. TATA salt lite
3. TATA Black salt
4. TATA rock salt

== Advertising ==
In its advertising, Tata Salt positions itself as Desh Ka Namak, translating roughly to "The Nation's Salt". The original 'Desh Ka Namak' campaign was conceived by Puneet Bhatnagar with the theme: Maine Desh Ka Namak Khaya Hai! The agency on record was Bates Advertising, Mumbai (2002). The Desh Ka Namak ad film was directed by Chex Chakraborty, and the jingle was composed by Ajay Bhatia. It was sung by Shankar Mahadevan.

The latest advertisement for the brand Ghul Mil frames India's unity in diversity by comparing the blending of its people to how Tata Salt dissolves in water. In the North East region of India, the salt is priced at ₹20, while in the rest of the country, it costs ₹30.

== Awards and recognition ==
Tata salt was ranked 316th among India's most trusted brands according to the Brand Trust Report 2012, a study conducted by Trust Research Advisory. In the Brand Trust Report 2013, Tata Salt was ranked 106th among India's most trusted brands while according to the Brand Trust Report 2014, Tata salt was ranked 199th among India's most trusted brands. It was among 16 of Tata Group's subsidiary brands to feature in the report apart from the parent brand. Ratan Tata also featured in the report among India's most trusted 'Personality' brands. Tata Salt was the 2nd Most Trusted Brand of India in 2015. Additionally, Tata Salt earned the prestigious title of "India’s Most Desired Salt Brand in 2023", according to TRA's Most Desired Brands Report 2023.
