= Organic India =

Indian Ayurvedic company

- Industry: Organic foods, health supplements and Ayurvedic products
- Founders: Bharat Mitra, Bhavani Lev
- Fate: Acquired by Tata Consumer Products
- Products: Organic Tulsi teas, health supplements and Commodities
- Brands: Tulsi green tea, Tulsi Original, Tulsi Masala Chai, Tulsi ginger,
- Owner: Tata Consumer Products
- Parent: Tata Consumer Products
- Website: www.organicindia.com

Organic India is a multi-national company founded in 1997 by couple Bharat Mitra and Bhavani Lev (née Holly Bronfman), in Lucknow, India, that produces halal certified organic herbal and Ayurvedic health products. The company is most known for their line of organically grown tulsi teas, which are sold in India, the US, Canada, and the UK.

== Overview ==
The company created an organic, natural, non-toxic, herbal version of the colourful dyes used in India's annual Holi celebration, and operates a retail store in Maharashtra, India. The company also exports organically-grown flowers, with Germany as its major market.

== Collaboration ==
Organic India works directly with marginal farmers in tribal villages, providing seeds, fertilisers, organic certification, and assumption of risk in case of crop failure. It has helped convert 10000 acres of arable land in Uttar Pradesh, Rajasthan, Uttarakhand, J&K and Madhya Pradesh

In January 2024, Organic India was acquired by Tata Consumer for ₹1,900 crore.
