= Tocklai Tea Research Institute =

Agricultural research center in Assam, India

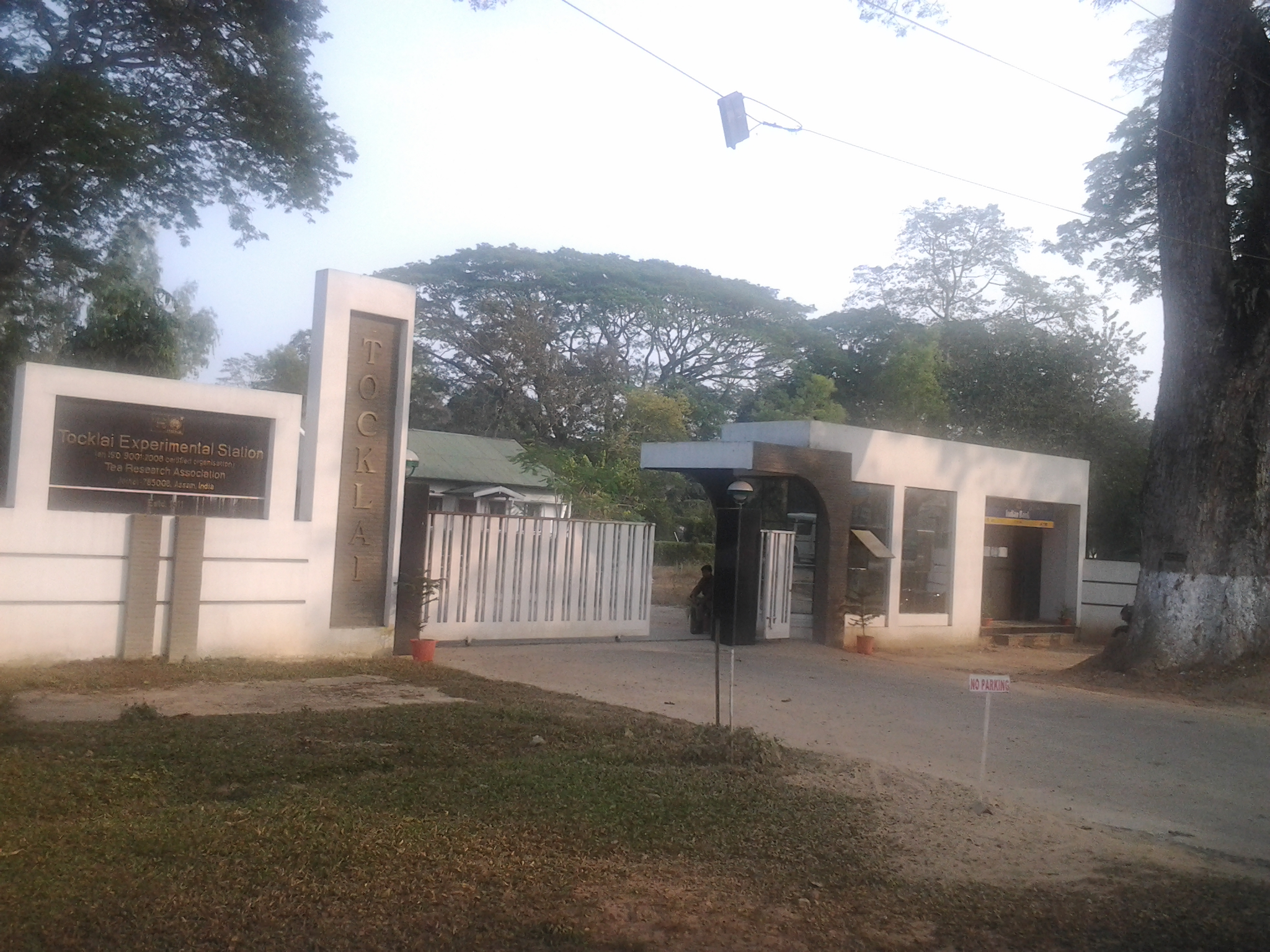
- Entrance of Tocklai Tea Research Institute
- Former names: Tocklai Experimental Station
- Type: Tea research institute
- Established: 1911 (115 years ago)
- Parent institution: Tea Research Association (TRA)
- Director: Dr. Venkatesan Selvaraj
- Location: Sadar, Cinnamara, Jorhat, Assam, India
- Website: www.tocklai.org

The Tocklai Tea Research Institute (formerly Tocklai Experimental Station) of Tea Research Association (TRA) is an Indian tea research institute for the development of tea and its agricultural practices located in Jorhat, Assam, India. Founded in 1911, it is the world's oldest tea research institute.

== See also ==
- History of tea in India
- Assam tea
