= Tetley Tea Folk =

Advertising characters

The Tetley Tea Folk are animated characters used to advertise Tetley Tea from 1973 to 2001 and from 2010 to 2012 and 2014–2016.

Archie, the youngest of the Tea Folk

== Tea Folk history ==
The Canadian copywriter John McGill Lewis (1929–2009) of the advertising agency McCann Erickson originated the Tetley Tea Folk in 1973, working with art director Peter Rigby, who created the original characters of the Tea Folk, before briefing Wyatt Cattaneo to animate them. The animated commercials were produced at Wyatt Cattaneo studios, where the Gaffer, Sidney, and supporting characters were animated by studio director Tony Cattaneo and animator Ramon Modiano.

The series, from its start until the early 1980s, combined animation with live-action sets and "props", such as real tea bags, cups, saucers, etc. The live-action was first of all shot at the studios of Morgan and Mount and later by Perkins St.Claire. The series, from its start until the early 1980s, was animated by Ramon Modiano. The musical score for the "Tea Folk" song was composed by Ken Jones, with the lyrics coming from their originator J. M. Lewis. The art director was Peter Rigby.

Towards the end of the 1970s, the Tetley Tea Folk account moved to the advertising agency D'Arcy, Mac Manus and Macius. The line "That's Better. That's Tetley" was written by Jack Stephens and ran on Tetley advertising for over eighteen years. From the early 1980s, Tetley's advertising was written and produced by the advertising agency D'Arcy, while the Tea Folk illustrations and advertisements were then animated by animator Richard Olive.

There have been sixty-seven animated television adverts, and many appearances in papers, magazines, on packs, radio, the internet, as well as Tea Folk memorabilia. Over thirty million Tea Folk items have been sold, and items from the Tetley Tea Folk can now be found in over five million homes in the United Kingdom.

The Tea Folk has provided memorable advertising on Britain's television screens. Some well-known lines include:

- Tetley make tea bags make tea.
- That's Better. That's Tetley.
- Only Tetley will do.
- Tetley bags all the flavour.

These, along with the original Tetley tune, and some notable soundtracks (Bill Withers’ "Lovely Day", Irving Berlin's "I've Got My Love to Keep Me Warm", and "Reach Out I’ll Be There" by Holland, Holland and Dozier), have made Tetley's Tea Folk adverts some of the most instantly recognizable ever seen.

The characters' voices have been supplied by some distinguished actors throughout the campaign. For many years, Gaffer's distinctive voice was provided by Brian Glover. He was later replaced by former Emmerdale star Bobby Knutt, while George Layton is the voice of Sidney.

The Tetley Tea Folk were at No. 40 in Channel 4's 100 Greatest TV Ads.

=== The end of the Tetley Tea Folk ===
In 2001, Tetley released a statement: "As part of an overall review of the marketing of the Tetley Tea brand in the United Kingdom, we are re examining our Advertising Agency arrangements. We cannot speculate on what changes this may lead to, and cannot say at this stage how it might affect the use of the Tea Folk in the future." The Tea Folk were eventually replaced with a more modern campaign, aimed at recruiting young tea drinkers.

In July 2002, Tetley announced sales fell dramatically due to axing the Tea Folk.

=== Return ===
On 30 June 2010, by now a nine-year absence, it was announced that the Tetley Tea Folk were to be reintroduced, in a bid to reclaim the title of Britain's Best Tea Brand from PG Tips. The first advert was shown on 20 September 2010, during the broadcast of Coronation Street. It showed an employee of Tetley spilling some Tetley tea, which caused the Tea Folk to wake from their decade of sleep. The second advert, shown in October, showed the Tea Folk exploring the factory, to the general awe of the factory's workers.

They remark on how far Tetley has come, with introductions of product lines such as Red bush, Green and Extra Strong tea. Their latest advert in April 2011 promoted the Red bush variety.

On 25 January 2014, after a two-year break, the tea folk (now only consisting of Gaffer, Sydney and Tina) returned, this time in CGI form, where they inadvertently averted an invasion of aliens by giving them tea. In an advert in December 2014, it featured the trio getting caught up in a medieval battle, but are able to stop the battle by giving everyone tea. Between 2013 till sometime in 2016, Tetley sponsored airings of family films on Channel 5 through sponsorship idents featuring Gaffer and Sydney in CGI, parodying various movie genres.

The final advert of the tea folk released in January 2016, sees Gaffer sings about how many British events (such as Winston Churchill, rock and roll and the Spirit of '66) would never have happened without tea.

== Characters ==
=== Gaffer ===
Gaffer and Tetley go back a long way. He has worked his way up from Tea Boy to become the boss of the Tetley Tea Folk. He first appeared as the star of the very first Tea Folk advert in 1973. He is a bit of a perfectionist; after all, making the best cup of tea in the world is a big responsibility and he truly understands just how important Tetley tea is to people.

=== Sydney ===
Sydney first appeared in 1975. He is a gentle and kind fellow, who is always on hand with a well made cup of Tetley tea in times of a crisis. Although he may not be the cleverest of people, his kind heart and occasional daftness mean that, even when he gets himself into trouble, he is well loved and highly thought of by his peers.

He apparently went missing for many a year, which resulted in the phrase "Where's Sydney?" being used as its own advertising campaign.

=== Maurice ===
Maurice is the inventor, a mechanically minded engineering genius whose machines help to keep Tetley at the cutting edge of tea technology. He is quiet, unassuming and practical with sparks of inspiration - an eccentric and gloriously unpredictable inventor constantly striving for excellence on behalf of Tetley. Maurice first appeared in 1982.

=== Clarence ===
Clarence first appeared in 1988, originally the "Waker Upper" who makes sure the hard working Tea Folk all get to work on time. He is fun loving, happy and exuberant, a young, cheeky character, whose occasional over-enthusiasm has been known to earn him a kindly reprimand from Gaffer, although it is always for his own good. When it comes to his tea duties, Clarence is a serious hard worker, who is learning to take more responsibility.

=== Gordon ===
Gordon, who first appeared in 1989, is the Tea Folk gardener. He is quiet, gentle and dependable. Gordon is the quiet, knowledgeable caretaker, who lovingly and methodically maintains the Tetley Tea Garden. With his love of tea and knowledge of gardening he has personally cultivated the Tetley Tea Rose.

=== Tina ===
Tina first appeared in 1990. Being the only female in the group. She is caring, fun loving and helpful. Tina has a special place in the hearts of all the team of Tetley Tea Folk. Her straightforward approach to life means that she is often called upon to provide a listening and understanding ear.

=== Archie ===
Archie first appeared in 1993, and is the youngest of the Tea Folk. He is Gaffer's nephew, and although he is fascinated by Tetley Tea, and is being nurtured to one day step into Gaffer's famous slippers, he is still at school. Archie is full of life and always inquisitive. This enquiring and mischievous nature occasionally lands him in deep water, until his Uncle Gaffer helps him out.

== Tetley Tea Folk collectibles ==
A wide range of collectibles have been produced focusing on the subject of the Tetley Tea Folk. Tetley has teamed up with some big name companies (including Wade and Lledo). According to Collecticus magazine, a gold trimmed Morris Minor money box, released in September 2006, is the most valuable of the collectables, worth as much as £200 on the secondary market.
