= Kanan Devan Hills Plantations Company =

Indian consumer products company

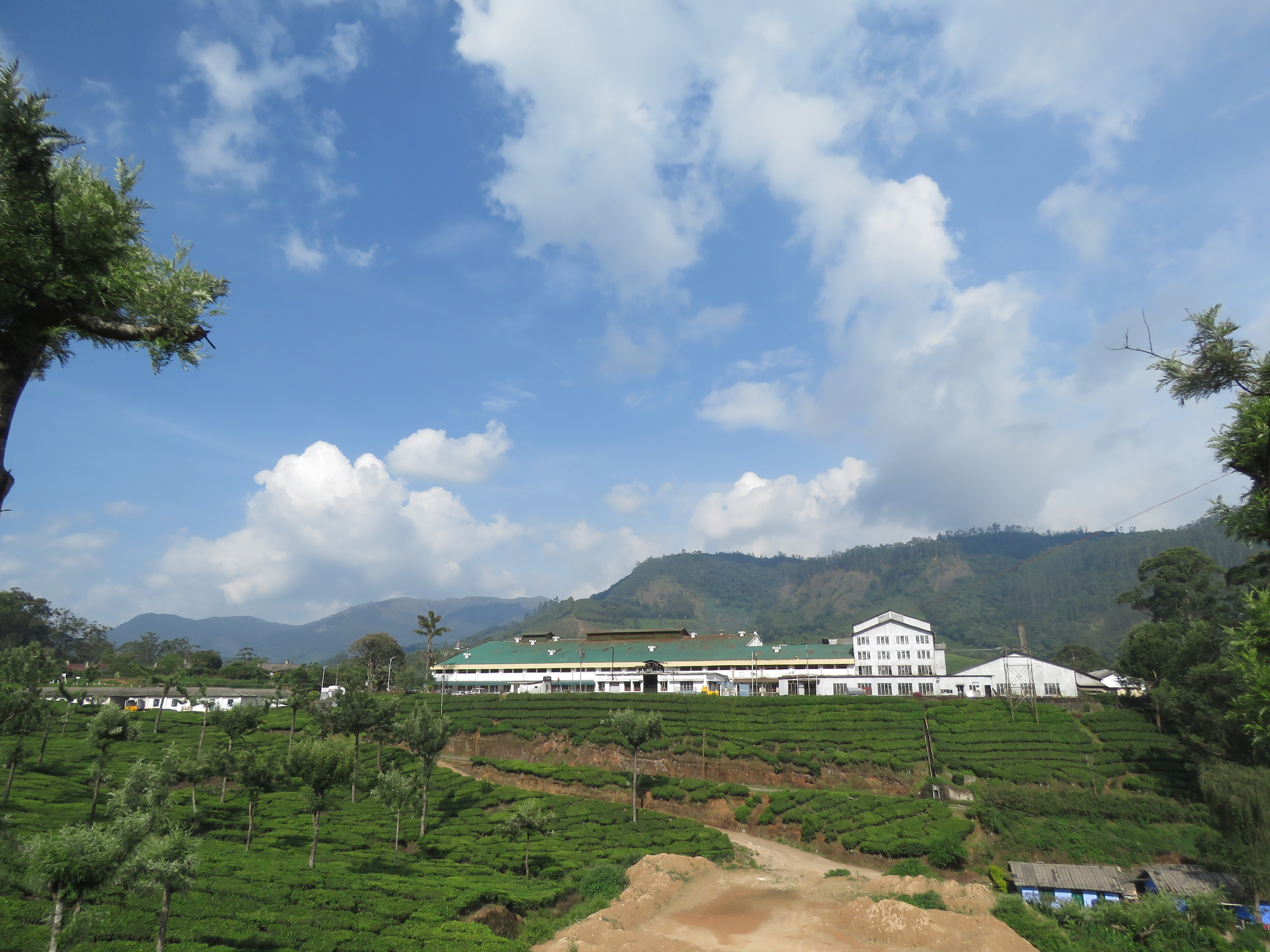
- Madupatty Factory
- Type: Private
- Industry: Food Industry
- Founded: 1 April 2005; 21 years ago
- Headquarters: Idukki, Kerala, India
- Key people: Percy T. Siganporia (Chairman); K. Mathew Abraham (MD & CEO)
- Products: Tea, coffee, spices, aromatics
- Number of employees: 12000+ (2020)
- Website: www.kdhptea.com

Kanan Devan Hills Plantations Company Private Limited, abbreviated as KDHP, is a privately owned Indian consumer goods and tea plantation company headquartered in Kerala in the Idukki district. The company was formed in 2005 after the exit of Tata Tea from its plantations in Munnar. Tata Tea Ltd restructured and transferred its holdings to the Kanan Devan Hills village under participatory management.

The company retails its products under the RippleTea brand name. RippleTea products include a variety of teas, essential oils and aromatic products, incense sticks and coffee.

== Branded operations ==
In the year 2010, while primarily being a B2B player, KDHP launched its consumer brand Ripple Tea for distribution in retail outlets across Munnar Kerala

== Ecommerce operations ==
In 2015, Kanan Devan Hills Plantations Company Private Limited launched its e-commerce portal for distribution across India. In 2020, KDHP re-launched an independent e-comm portal for Ripple Tea.

== Retail outlet operations ==
The company ventured into branded retail outlets in 2018 with the launch of three Chai Bazar Outlets in Munnar. These were further expanded in 2019 under the franchise model with the opening of an outlet in Kumily Kerala

== Environmental record ==
KDHP took a step forward towards sustainably grown teas in 2014, by getting certified by Rainforest Alliance. The company has USDA Organic certification for 300 acres of its plantations at Top Station and Fairtrade certification at Chundavurrai estate since 2009. KDHP estates and factories obtained Trustea certification in 2014.

== Gallery ==
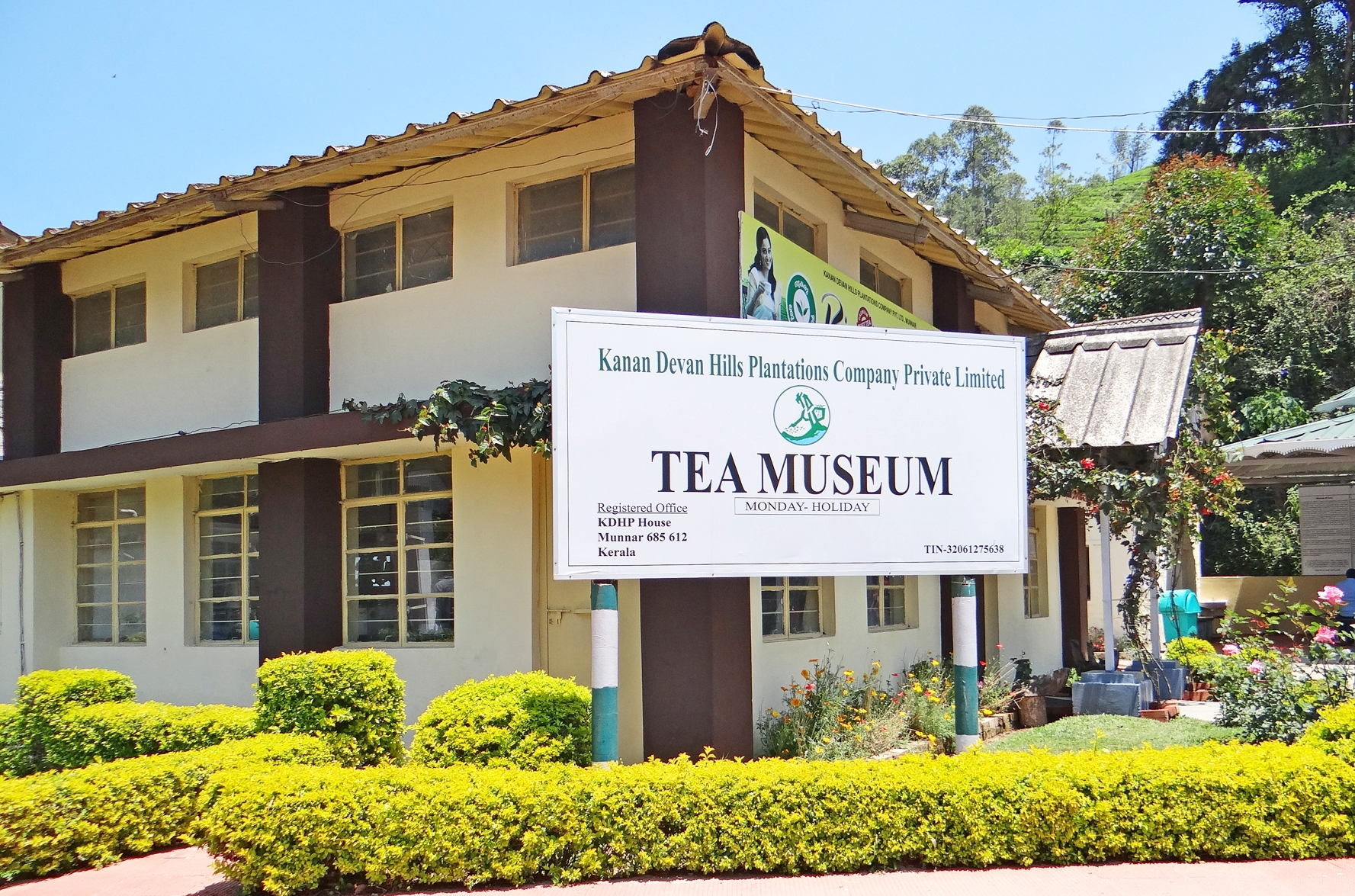
Tea Museum in Munnar town

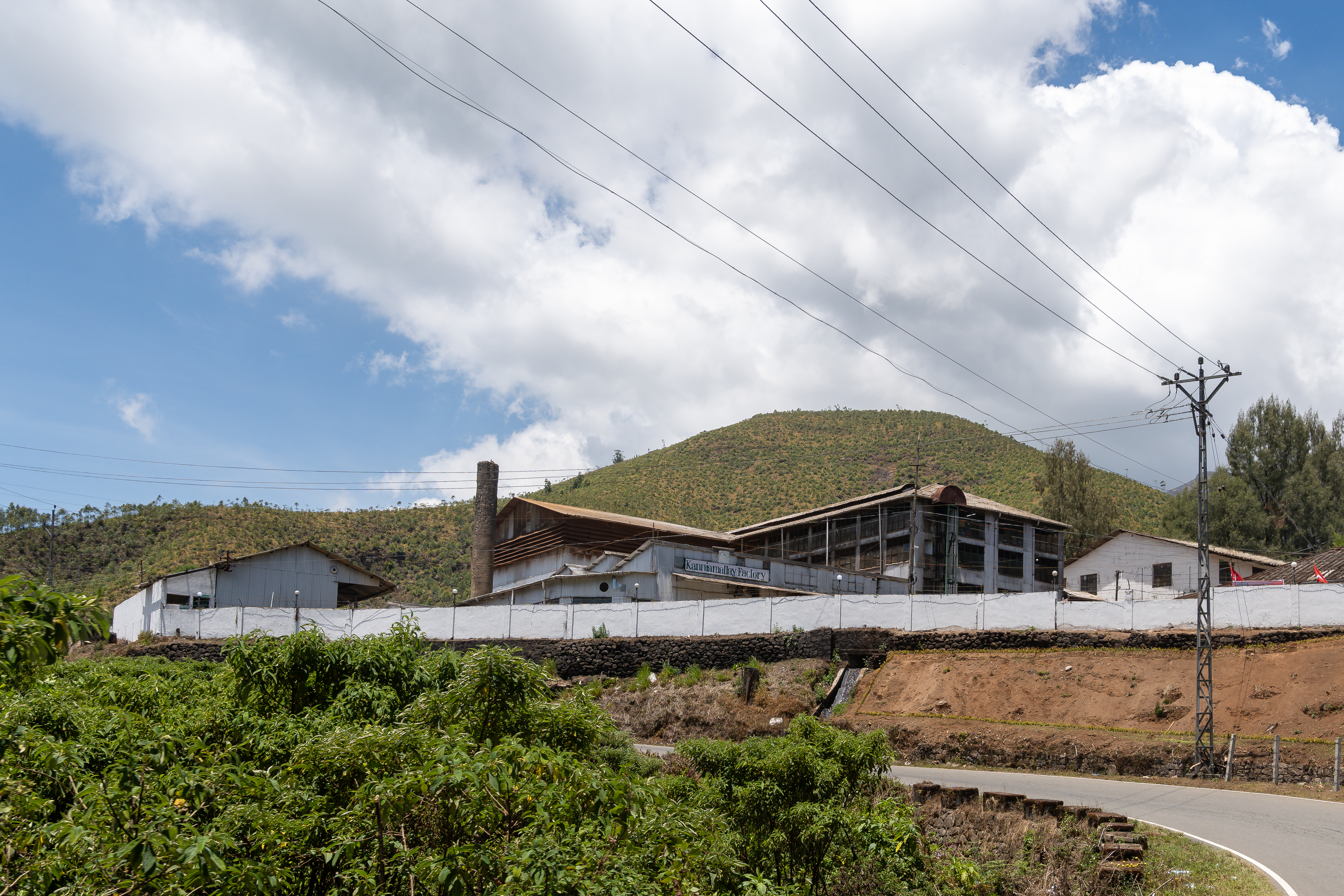
Kannimallay Factory in Munnar town
