= KDHP Tea Museum =

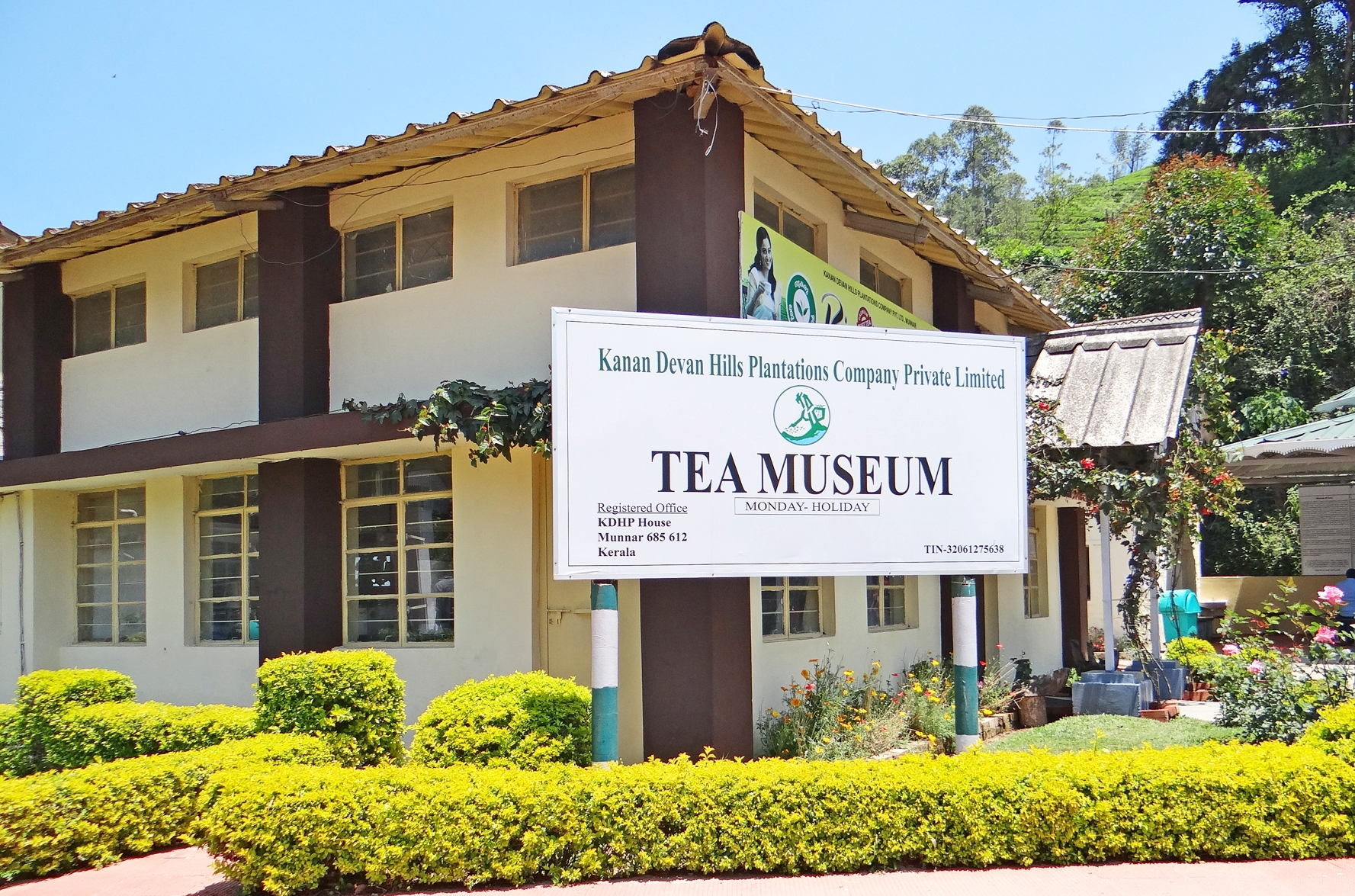
- Established: 1 April 2004; 22 years ago
- Location: Munnar, Idukki district Kerala, India
- Coordinates: 10.095544°N 77.050717°E
- Type: Tea museum, industry and history museum

The KDHP Tea Museum is an industry and history museum situated in Munnar, a town in the Idukki district of Kerala in South India. Tata Tea Museum is its official name, but it is also known as Nullathanni Estate where it is located, or Kanan Devan Hills Plantation (KDHP) Tea Museum.

== History and points of interest ==
The tea estate is owned by Kanan Devan Hills Plantations Company – the plantation dates back to the 1880s. The museum opened on 1 April 2004. The tea museum preserves the aspects on the genesis and growth of tea plantations in Kerala's mountain region in the Idukki district on the Western Ghats at the border to the Coimbatore district of Tamil Nadu.

Tata Tea opened the museum which houses curiosities, photographs and machineries, depicting a turning point that contributed to Idukki's flourishing tea industry. Set up at the Nallathanni Estate, the museum is a tribute to its pioneers who transformed Munnar into a major tea plantation centre of Kerala, from the rudimentary tea roller from 1905 to a fully automated tea factory. Visitors and tea lovers can see various stages of the tea processing – Crush, tear, curl - and learn about the production of Kerala black tea variants. The power generation plant of the estate dates back to 1920s; a rail engine wheel of the Kundala Valley Railway that shuttled between Munnar and Top Station by 1924. A section of the museum also houses classic bungalow furniture and office equipment of the Colonial area in Kerala. Tea tasting across different varieties of tea is another attraction here. A 2nd-century burial urn was discovered at the Periakanal tea estate; it is also displayed at the museum.

== Facilities ==
The museum is about 1.5 kilometres (0.93 mi) from the Munnar town, situated in the Nalluthanni Estate. Aluva is the nearest railway station (112 kilometres (69.59 mi)); Cochin International Airport is about 72 kilometres (44.74 mi) away. Kerala State Road Transport Corporation provides buses from different locations to Munnar town. The museum is open from 9 am to 5 pm); it is closed on Mondays. Address: Tata Tea Museum, Nalluthanni Estate, Munnar, KL-685 612, Idukki district, Kerala.

== Gallery ==
KDHP building entrance

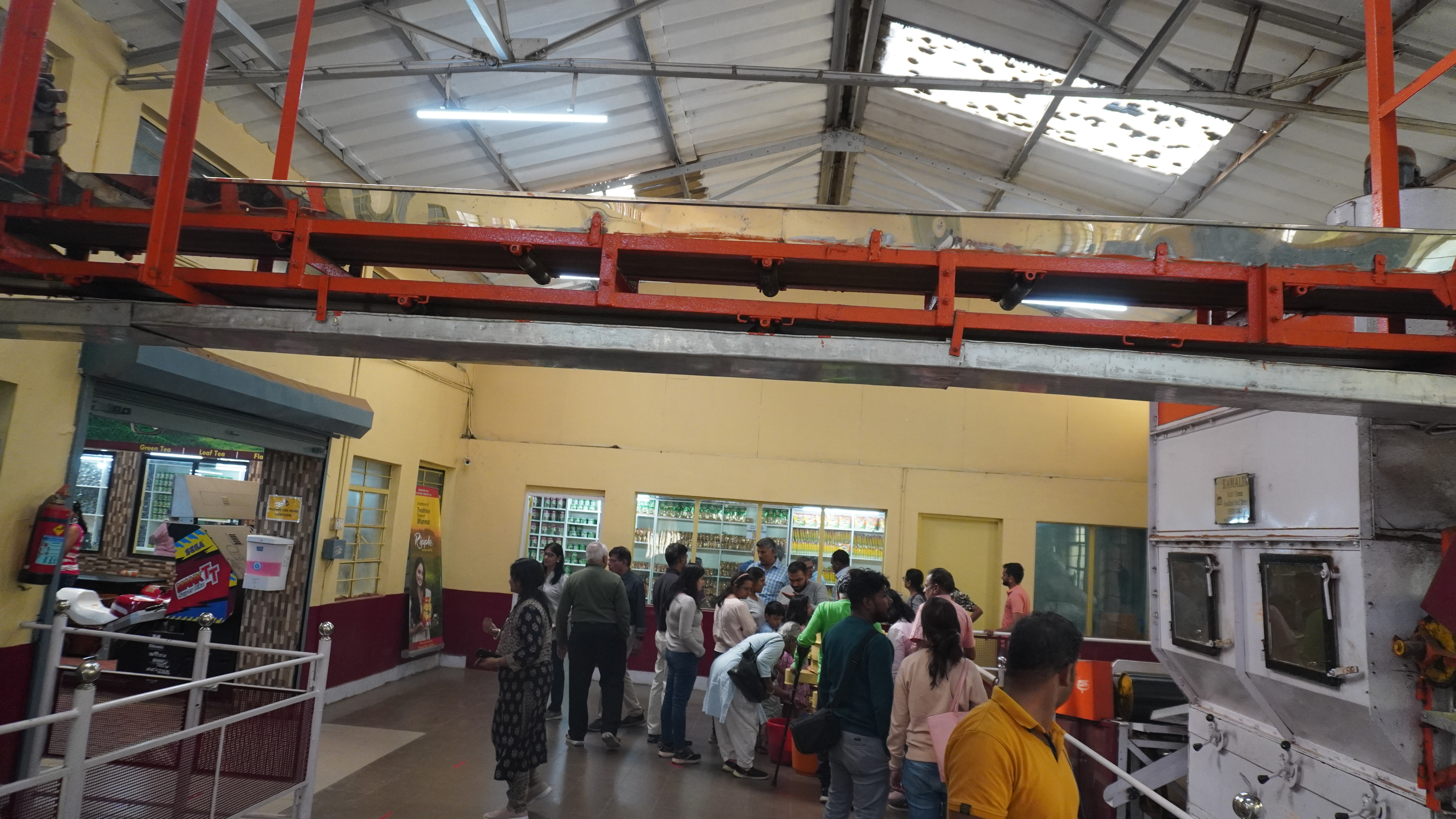
Interior

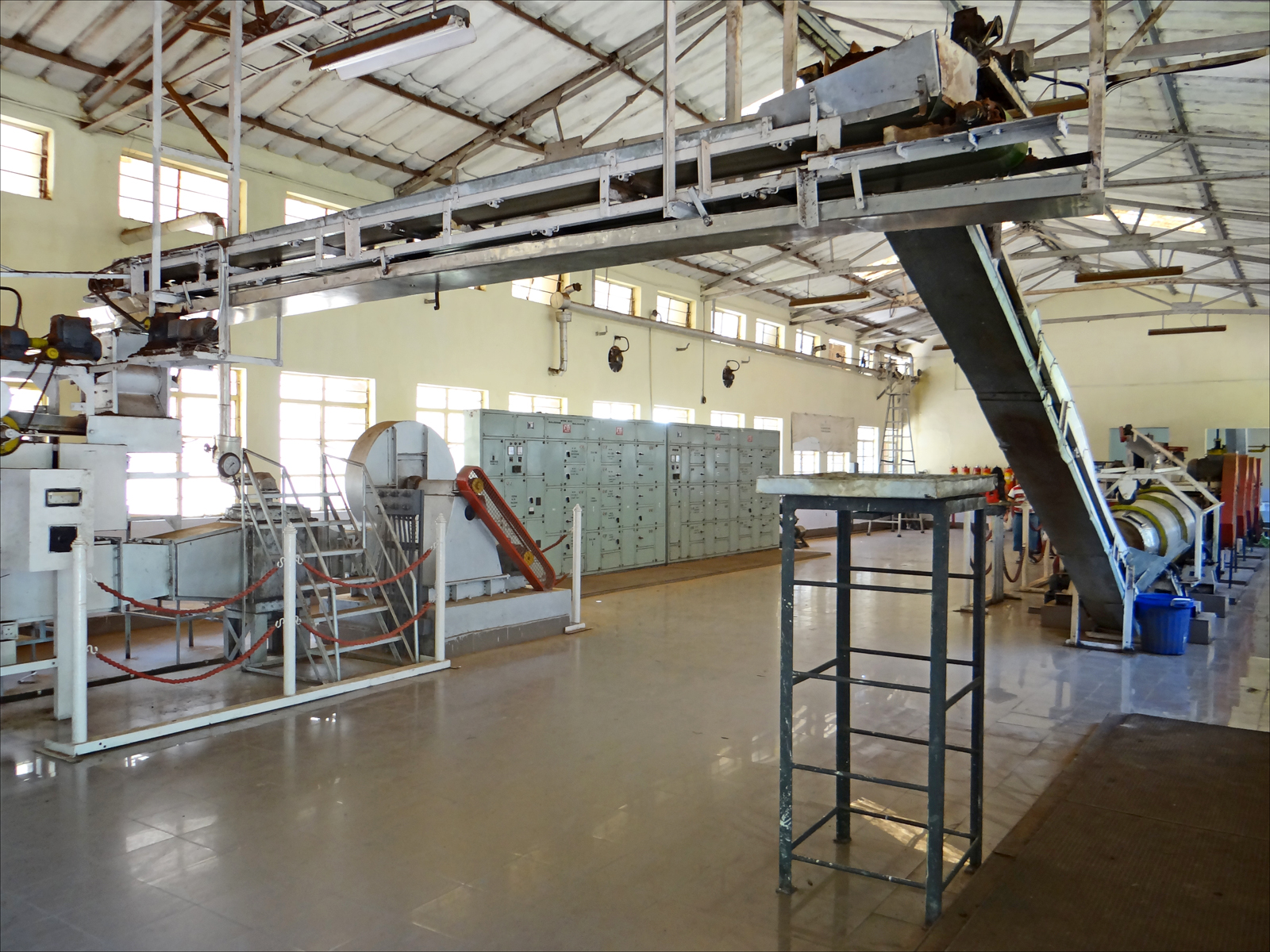
Interior

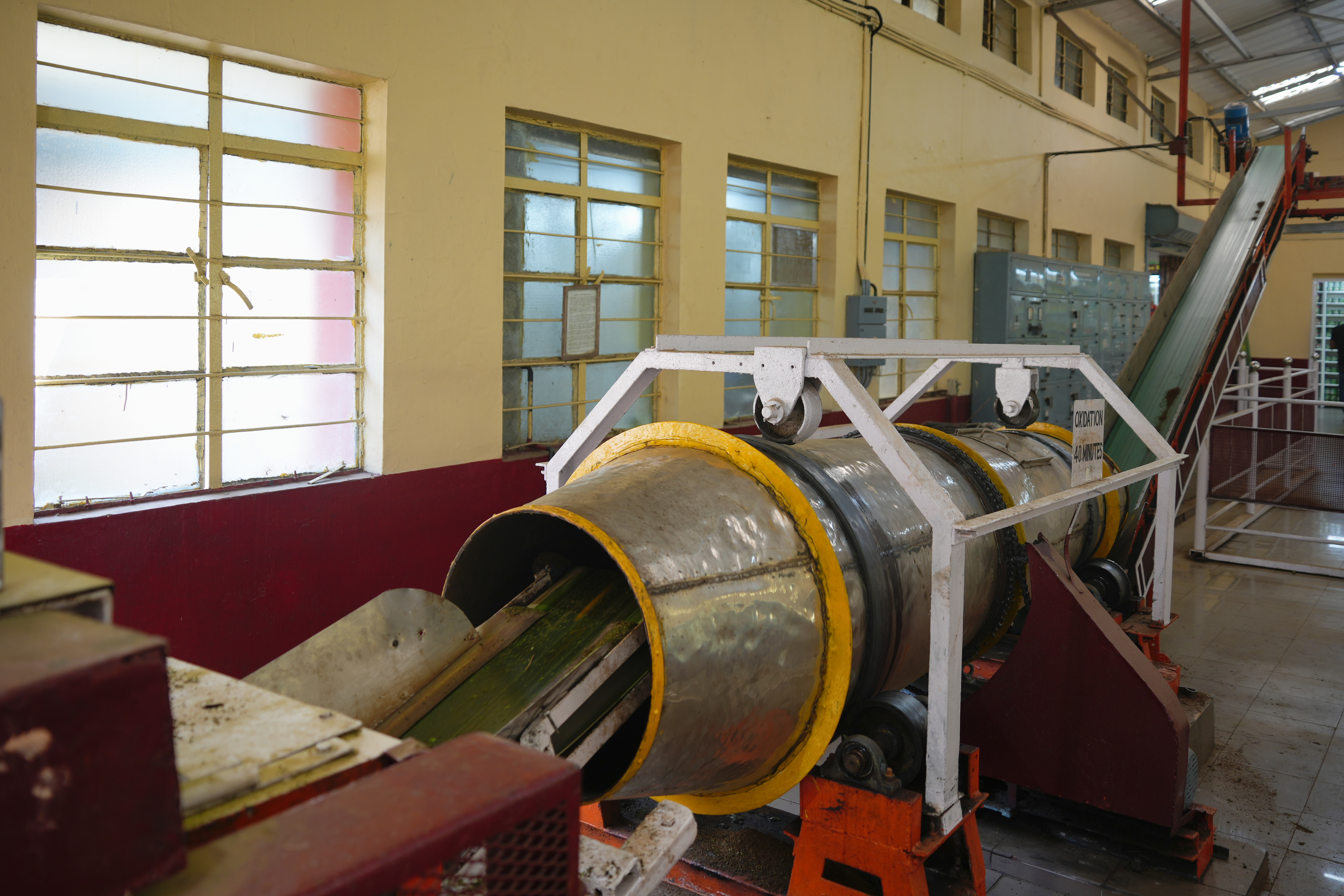
Interior

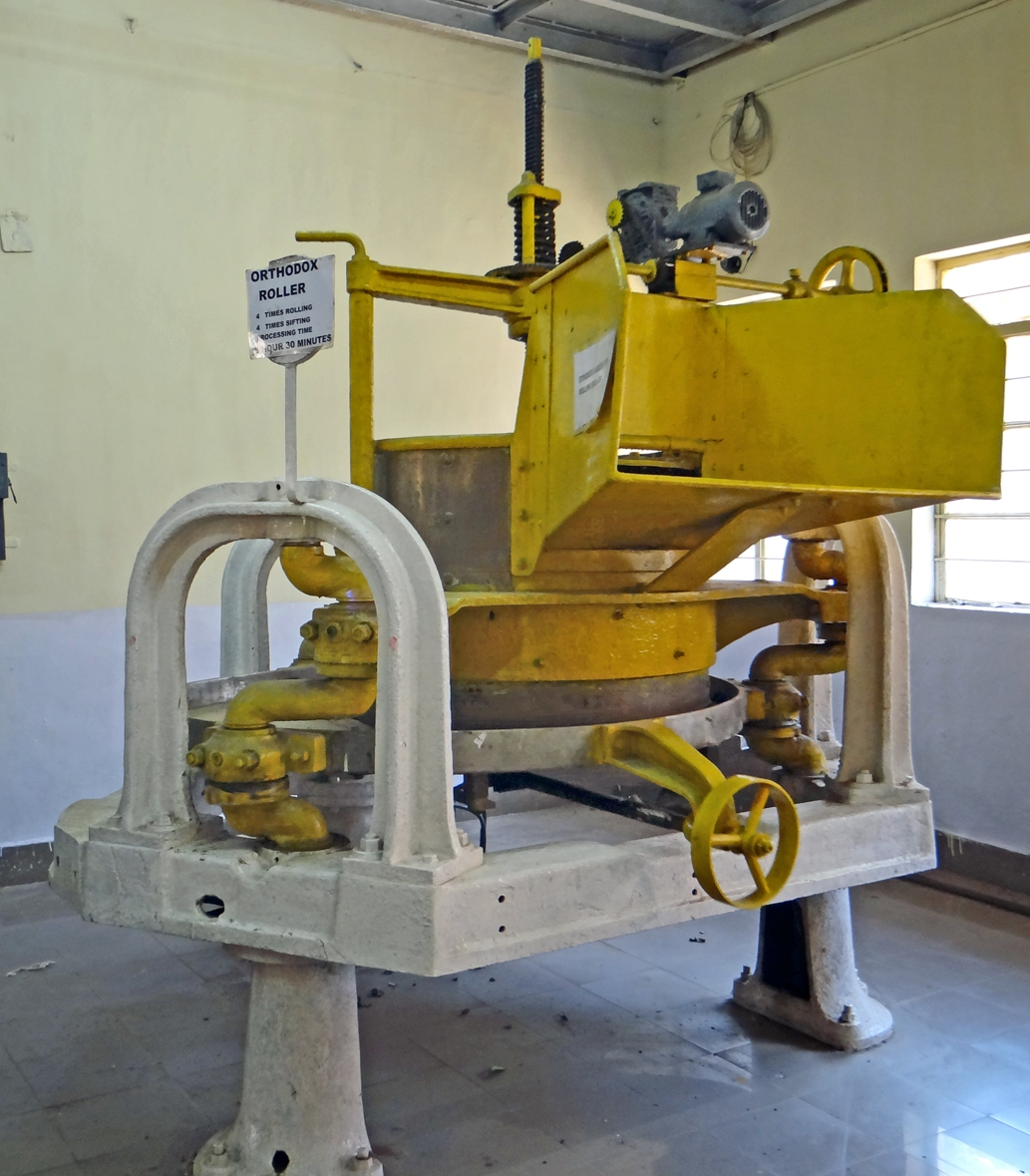
Tea leaf rolling machine

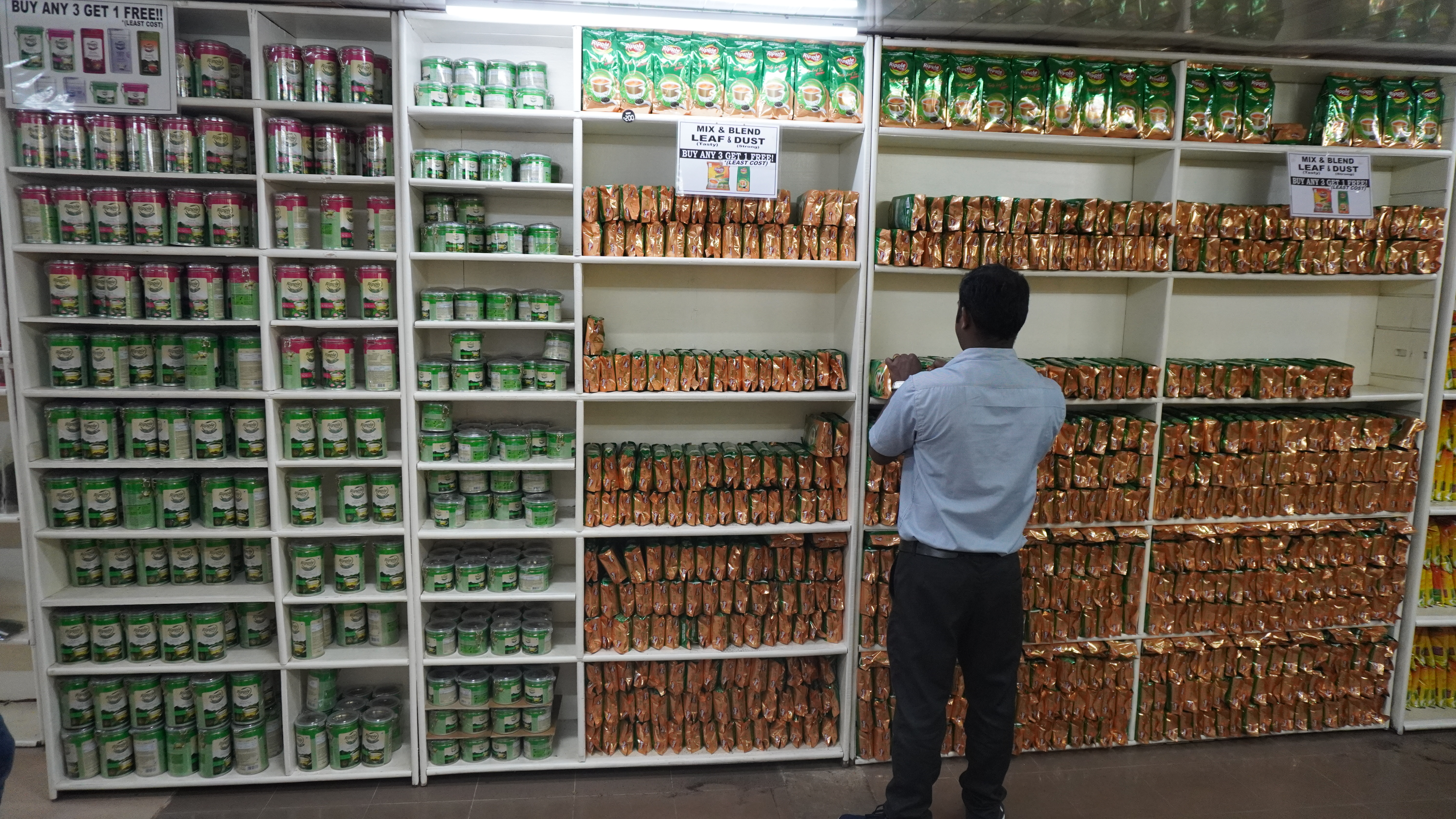
Interior

== See also ==
- 2015 Munnar Plantation strike
