= Tetley =

Tea company

- Type: Subsidiary
- Industry: Food
- Founded: 1837 (189 years ago)
- Founder: Joseph and Edward Tetley
- Headquarters: Greenford, London, England
- Area served: Worldwide
- Products: Tea
- Parent: Tata Consumer Products
- Website: tetley.com

Tetley is an English beverage manufacturer founded in 1837 in Yorkshire. It is the largest company of tea in the United Kingdom and Canada, and the second-largest in the United States by volume.

Since 2000, Tetley has been a wholly owned subsidiary of Tata Consumer Products (formerly Tata Global Beverages), making it the second-largest manufacturer of teas in the world, after Unilever.

== History ==
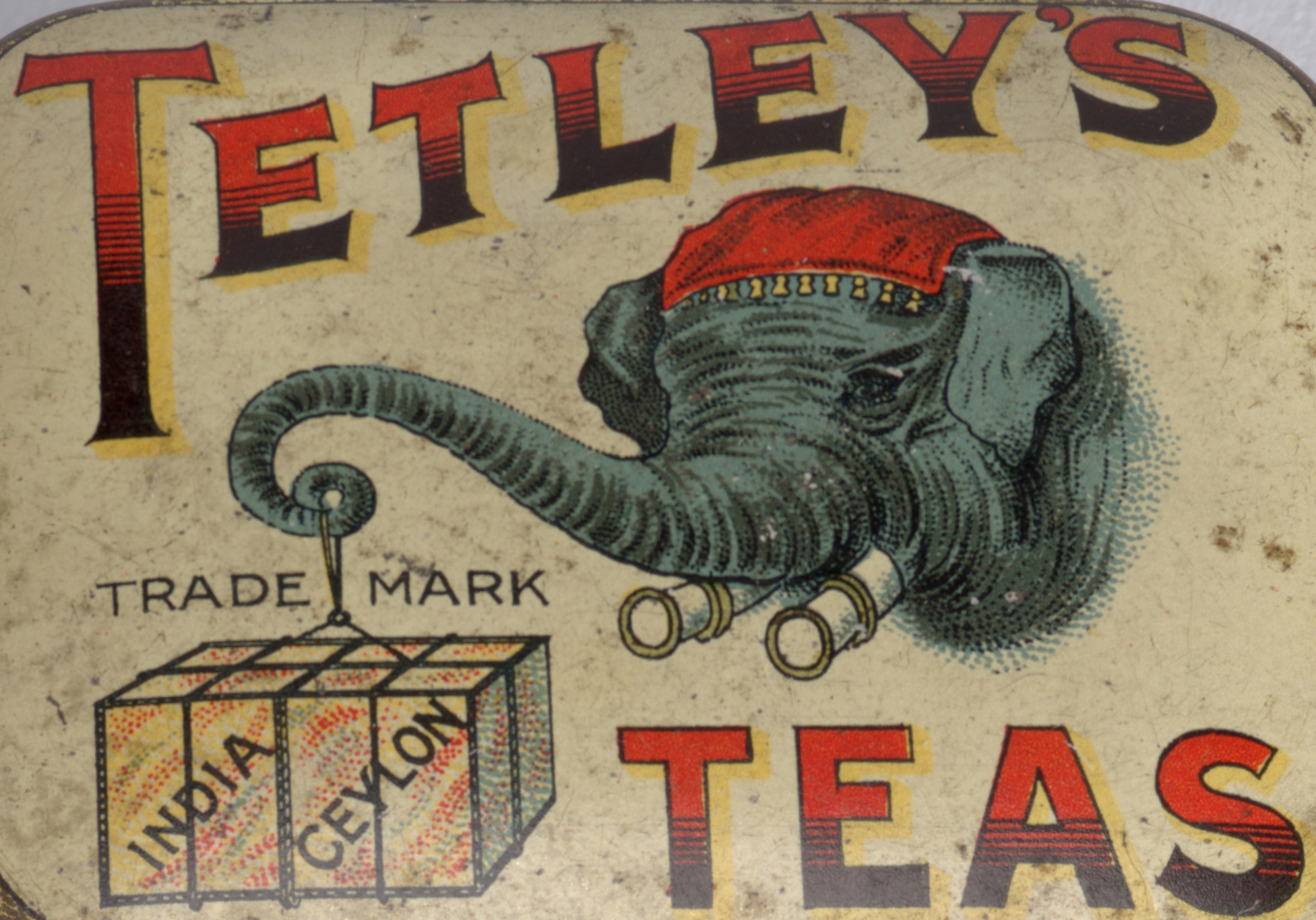
Advertisement for Tetley's Teas on a late-19th-century matchsafe

In 1822, brothers Joseph and Edward Tetley sold salt from a pack horse in Huddersfield, Yorkshire, England. They started to sell tea and were so successful they set up as "Joseph Tetley & Co." tea merchants in 1837. Relocating to London in 1856, they formed "Joseph Tetley & Company, Wholesale Tea Dealers", in partnership with Joseph Ackland.

In 1952, in an early example of cross promotion, Petula Clark's single "Anytime Is Tea Time Now" was used to advertise Tetley on Radio Luxembourg. Tetley was the first company to sell tea in tea-bags in the United Kingdom in 1953. In 1989, following extensive consumer tests establishing Britons' preferences, Tetley launched the round tea bag.

In 1973 the Tetley company was acquired by J. Lyons and Co. to form Lyons-Tetley. Following mergers, Lyons became part of Allied Lyons and then Allied Domecq.

The Tetley Group was created in July 1995, as a result of a buy in management buy out, when a group of investors bought the worldwide beverage business from Allied Domecq. The Tetley Group was bought by India's Tata Group in February 2000, for £271 million.

It was one of the largest overseas acquisitions by an Indian company at that time. The Tata Group is one of India's largest business conglomerates, comprising more than one hundred companies, including Tata Consumer Products. The acquisition has helped Tata's business ambitions to hold a global tea company.

As India reduced import duties on tea, Tata Consumer Products offset its reduced share of the domestic market by gains in Europe and North America. In April 2014, Columbia Law School and The Guardian reported that some of Tetley's tea is harvested by workers who do not receive the minimum wage in India.

In a statement placed on its website, Tetley's parent company, Tata Consumer Products, announced it had "appointed legal advisors to verify compliances by independent review. The legal advisors will also appoint and commission an independent third party Solidaridad to make an assessment into the living and working conditions of the workers at the APPL plantations (Amalgamated Plantations Private Limited)."

The company has claimed that tea from APPL plantations is not used in Tetley tea internationally, and that APPL has supplied only one small shipment of Assam tea for use in Tetley in India in the last three years. In October 2014, UNICEF announced that they are working with tea companies and with the Ethical Tea Partnership (ETP) to tackle child exploitation in Indian tea communities. The three-year program is funded by a number of advocacy groups, Tata Consumer Products, and Tesco.

== Operations ==
Tetley's manufacturing and distribution business operates in forty countries, selling over sixty branded tea bags. In the early days of Tetley's operations, the company was solely a distributor of tea, as it acquired its tea leaves through auctions. This led to the final product having a blend of 40 different types of tea from over 10,000 tea estates all over the world. Its premium packaging and quality helped it gain a tremendous market share. By 1990, with a yearly production of 20 billion teabags, Tetley was second worldwide only to Lipton. After the acquisition of Tetley by the then Tata Tea, Tetley's supply chains were consolidated with those of Tata Tea and most of Tetley's tea leaves now originate from Tata's plantations across India and Sri Lanka.

== See also ==
- Brooke Bond
- Lipton
- PG Tips
- Wissotzky Tea
- Tetley Tea Folk
- Typhoo tea
- Twinings
- Yorkshire Tea
- Clipper Teas
