= Smith & Jones instant noodles =

Instant noodles made by Capital Foods Ltd India

Smith & Jones is the brand name of instant noodles and sauces manufactured and distributed by Capital Foods Ltd India.

== Noodle flavors ==
The noodles are available in the following flavours:

- Smith & Jones masala flavour: (blend of various Indian spices)
- Smith & Jones curry flavour

Capital Foods also manufactures various other Chinese flavours under the brand name Ching's Secret:

- Manchurian
- Hot Garlic
- Szechwan

== Competitors ==
Maggi noodles and Nissin instant noodles are the top rivals in this market segment.
