= Indian tea culture =

Culture in India

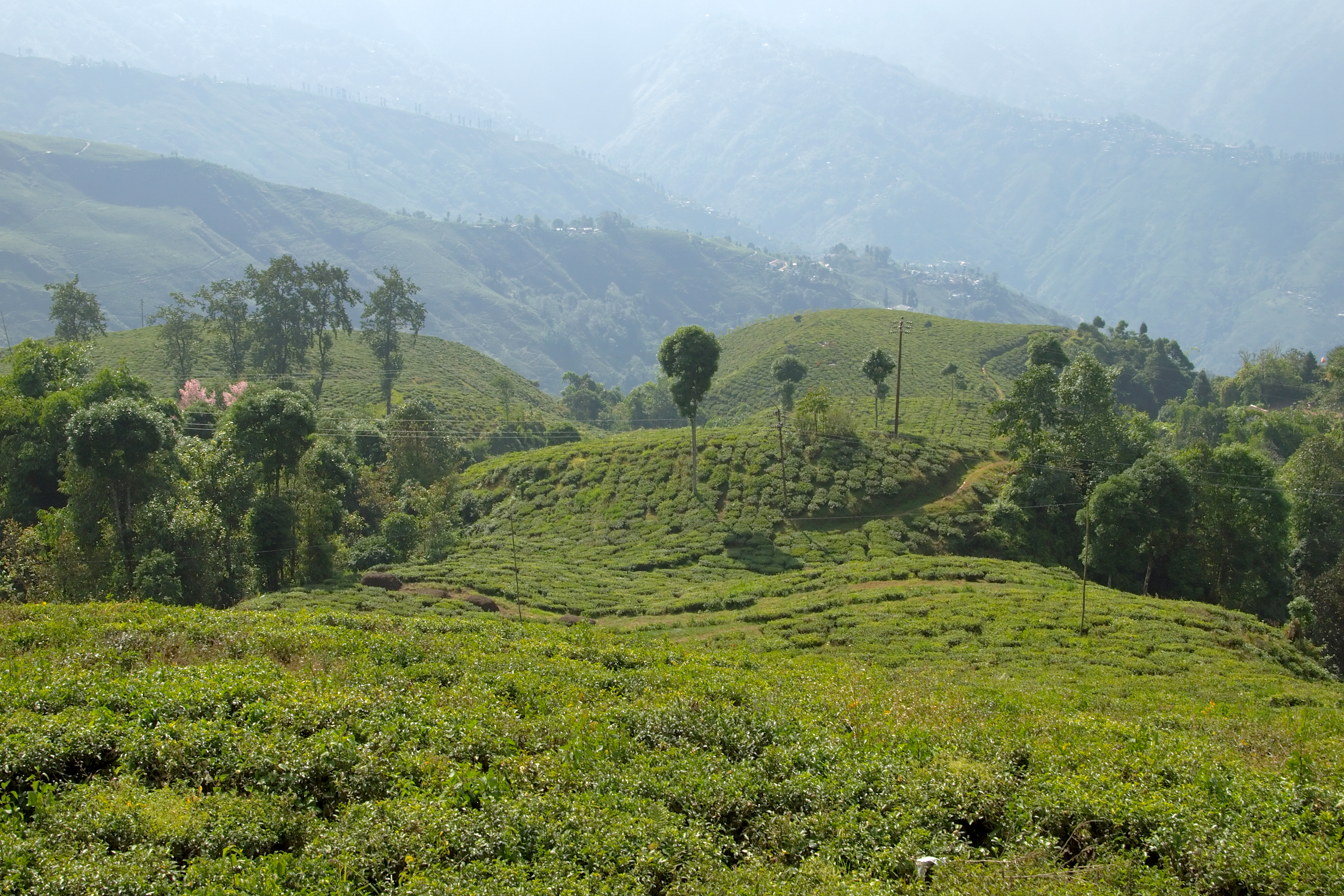
Darjeeling tea plantations, Darjeeling.

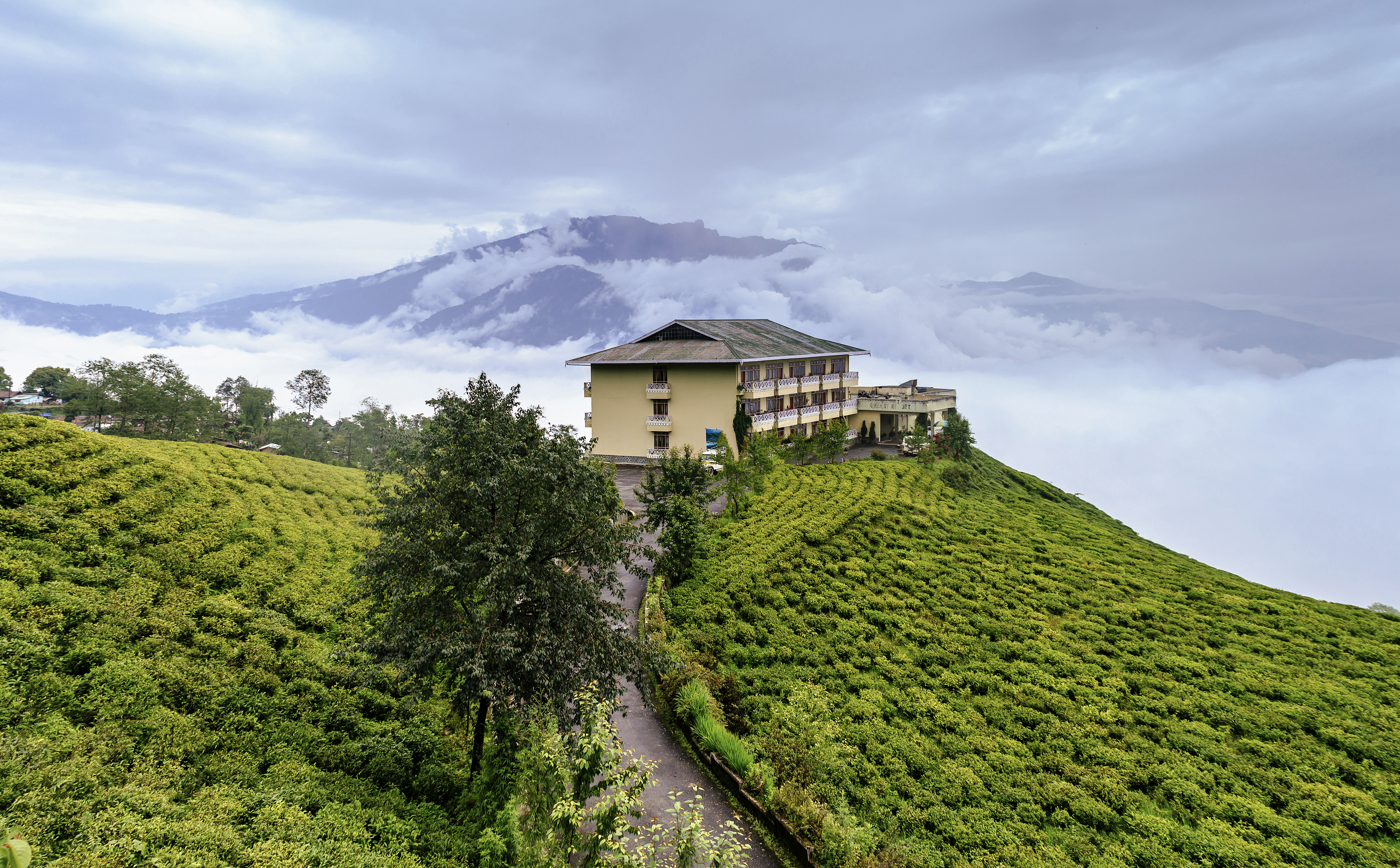
Cherry Resort inside Temi Tea Garden, Namchi, Sikkim

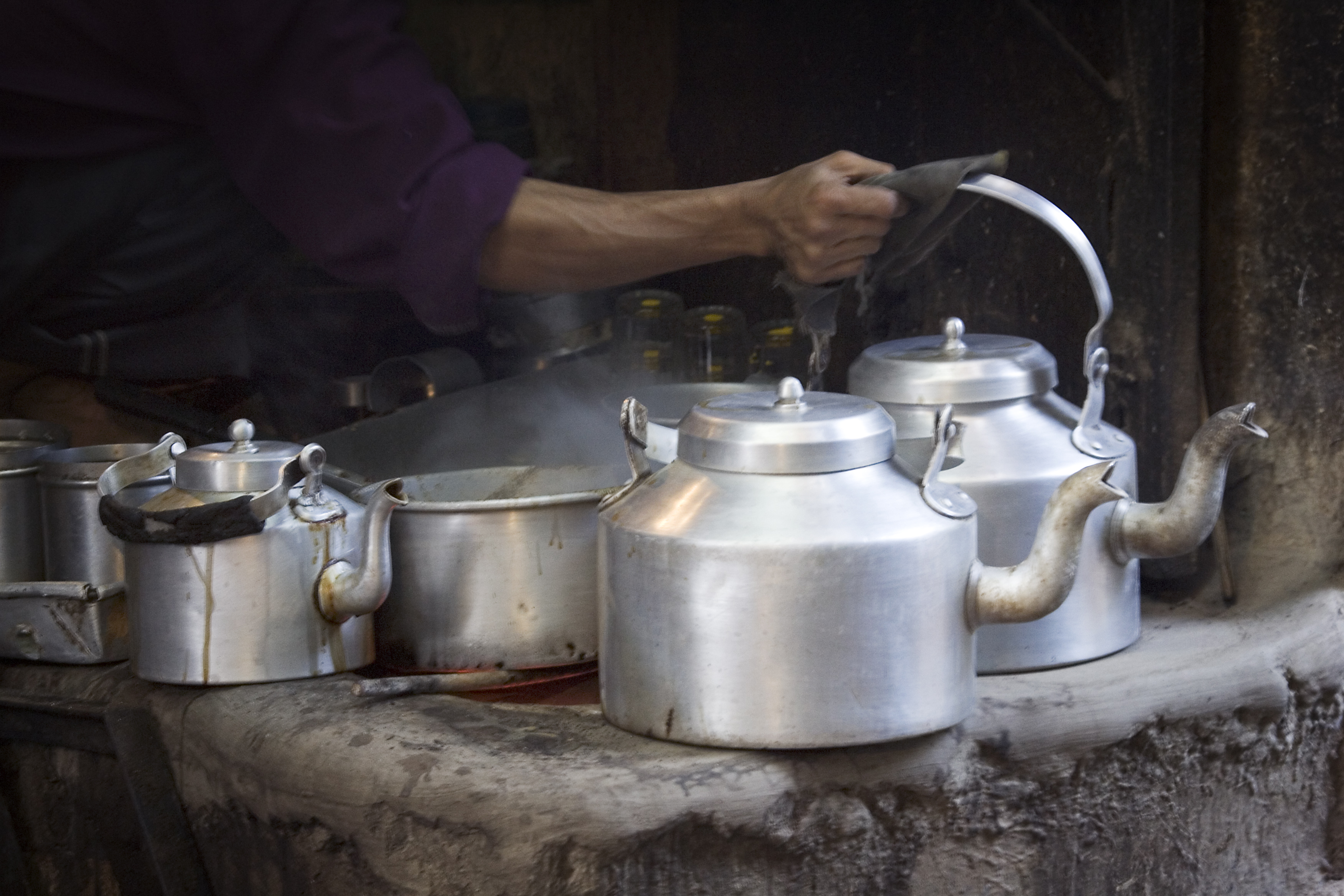
Masala Chai kettles of a street vendor in Varanasi, India

India is the second largest producer of tea in the world after China, including the famous Assam tea and Darjeeling tea. According to the ASSOCHAM report released in December 2011, India is the world's largest consumer of tea, consuming nearly 30% of global output. India is also the second-largest exporter of tea, after China.

The practice of Ayurveda has resulted in a long-standing tradition of herbal teas. Traditional Indian kitchens have long utilised the medicinal benefits offered by various plants and spices such as holy basil (Tulsi), cardamom (Elaichi), pepper (Kali Mirch), liquorice (Mulethi), mint (Pudina), etc., and traditionally, teas made with these plant leaves or spices have been in use for centuries for maladies ranging from the serious to the trifling. Tea is also mixed with these traditional herbs. The taste of chai (sweet and milky) helps disguise the stronger and more bitter flavours of some of the medicinal additives, while others such as cardamom, clove and ginger add a pleasing flavour and aroma to the tea along with health benefits.

For many years, documentation of tea in India was lost in history. Records re-emerge during the first century CE, with stories of the Buddhist monks Bodhidharma and Gan Lu, and their involvement with tea. Research, such as Robert Sealy's 1958 book A Revision of the Genus Camilla, suggests that tea is indigenous to the Indian subcontinent. Commercial production of tea in India did not begin until the arrival of the British East India Company, at which point large tracts of land were converted for mass tea production.

Today, India is one of the largest tea producers in the world, with over 70% of domestic tea being consumed within India itself. The Indian tea industry has grown to own many global tea brands, and has evolved to one of the most technologically equipped tea industries in the world. Tea production, certification, exportation, and all other facets of the tea trade in India is controlled by the Tea Board of India. Tea is the 'State Drink' of Assam. Following this the former Planning Commission (renamed Niti Aayog) Deputy Chairman, Montek Singh Ahluwalia had plans to officially recognise tea as the Indian "National Drink" in 2013.

== Ancient India ==
Tea cultivation in India has somewhat ambiguous origins. Though the extent of the popularity of tea in ancient India is unknown, it is known that the tea plant was a wild plant in India that was indeed brewed by local inhabitants of different regions. However, there is no substantial documentation of the history of tea drinking in the Indian subcontinent for the pre-colonial period. The Singpho tribe and the Khamti tribe, inhabitants of the regions where the Camellia sinensis plant grew native, have been consuming tea since the 12th century. It is also possible that tea may have been used under another name. Frederick R. Dannaway, in the essay "Tea As Soma", argues that tea was perhaps better known as "Soma" in ancient Indian history. The tea plant is native to East Asia and the Indian subcontinent, but the origins and history of tea are not precise. Many of the origin myths for tea are found in Chinese mythology, and the first verifiable records for tea consumption also point towards China.

The 1684 Treaty of Tingmosgang, mentions that a royal trader shall be sent by the Deywa Zhung (i.e. the Grand Lama of Lhasa), from Lhasa to Ladakh, once a year, with 200 horse-loads of tea.

== Dutch exploration ==
The next recorded reference to tea in India after the 12th century dates to 1598, when a Dutch traveler, Jan Huyghen van Linschoten, noted in a book that the leaves of the Assam tea plant were used by Indians as a vegetable, eaten with garlic and oil, and as a drink.

The same year, another reference to tea in India was recorded, by a different group of Dutch explorers.

== Early British surveys ==
In an 1877 pamphlet written by Samuel Baildon, and published by W. Newman and Co. of Calcutta, Baildon wrote, "...various merchants in Calcutta were discussing the chance of imported China seeds thriving in Assam, when a native from the province present, seeing some tea said, 'We have the plant growing wild in our jungles.'" It is then documented that the Assamese nobleman, Maniram Dutta Barua (also known as Maniram Dewan), showed British surveyors existing fields used for tea cultivation and wild tea plants growing in the Assamese jungle.

== East India Company ==
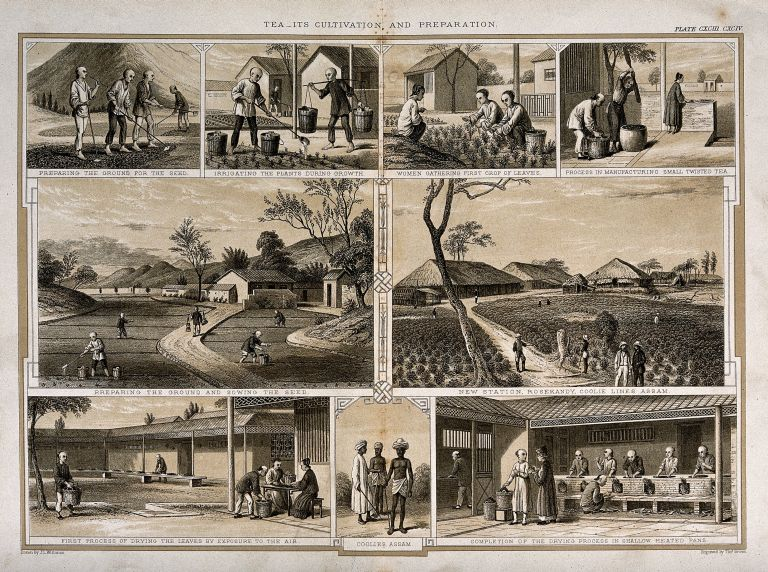
An 1850 depiction of the tea cultivation process in Assam, India

In the early 1820s, the British East India Company began large-scale production of tea in Assam, India, of a tea variety traditionally brewed by the Singpho tribe. In 1826, the British East India Company took over the region from the Ahom kings through the Treaty of Yandabo. In 1837, the first English tea garden was established at Chabua in Upper Assam; in 1840, the Assam Tea Company began the commercial production of tea in the region, run by indentured servitude of the local inhabitants. Beginning in the 1850s, the tea industry rapidly expanded, consuming vast tracts of land for tea plantations. By the start of the 20th century, Assam became the leading tea-producing region in the world. But despite the discovery of the indigenous Camellia sinensis plant, the tea industry in India began with 42,000 seedlings germinated from a consignment of 80,000 seeds procured from China—2000 were planted in the hill districts of South India, and 20,000 each in the hill districts in Kumaon in North India and Upper Assam on the Northeast frontier. It was only later that the indigenous plants were used. Today, the Chinese strain produces Darjeeling tea and the indigenous Assamese variety produces the remainder of the tea produced in India.

Writing in The Cambridge World History of Food (Kiple & Ornelas 2000:715–716), Weisburger & Comer write:

The tea cultivation begun there [India] in the nineteenth century by the British, however, has accelerated to the point that today India is listed as the world's leading producer, its 715, 000 tons well ahead of China's 540, 000 tons, and of course, the teas of Assam, Ceylon (from the island nation known as Sri Lanka), and Darjeeling are world famous. However, because Indians average half a cup daily on per capita basis, fully 70 percent of India's immense crop is consumed locally.

== Modern tea production in India ==
India was the top producer of tea for nearly a century, but recently China has overtaken India as the top tea producer due to increased land availability. Indian tea companies have acquired a number of iconic foreign tea enterprises including British brands Tetley and Typhoo. India is also the world's largest tea-drinking nation. However, the per capita consumption of tea in India remains a modest 750 grams per person every year due to the large population base and high poverty levels. From Rs 19,500 crore in 2011 (equivalent to US$4,007,396,450 in 2025), the total turnover of the Indian tea industry is expected to be Rs 33,000 crore by 2015 (equivalent to US$6,473,543,451 in 2025) according to the ASSOCHAM report of 2011. The same report pegs 90 per cent of all Indian households as regular tea drinkers. The reasons stated are "tea is cheap, affordable, and addictive." However, the annual per capita tea consumption in India was only 0.52 kg per person in 2009.

The Cambridge World History of Food (Kiple & Ornelas 2000:715–716), writes:

In general, even though India leads the world in tea technology, the methods employed to harvest the crop vary with the type of tea and terrain. Fine-leaf tea is hand plucked, and hand shears are used on mountain slopes and in other areas where tractor-mounted machines cannot go. A skilled worker using hand shears can harvest between 60 to 100 kg of tea per day, whereas machines cut between 1,000 and 2, 000 kg. The latter, however, are usually applied to low grade teas that often go into teabags. The tea "fluff" and waste from processing is used to produce caffeine for soft drinks and medicine.

== Geographical varieties of tea in India ==
As per the Tea Board under the Ministry of Commerce and Industry, Government of India, the tea varieties found in India are Darjeeling, Assam, Nilgiri, Kangra, Munnar, Dooars-Terai, Masala Tea and Sikkim tea. Most of the teas have been named after the regions they are produced in and they are also statutorily protected as Geographical Indicators.

=== Darjeeling tea ===
Darjeeling tea is grown at elevations ranging from 600 to 2000 metres above sea level with over 300 cm rainfall on average. They were first planted in the 19th century and now have their unique brand in the world.

According to the Tea Board of India, a consumer must check for Darjeeling logo and the Tea Board's certification and license numbers, or else one may not be having authentic Darjeeling tea.

The Tea Board claims Darjeeling tea is best drunk in porcelain teaware without any sugar or milk.

== Consumption of tea in India ==
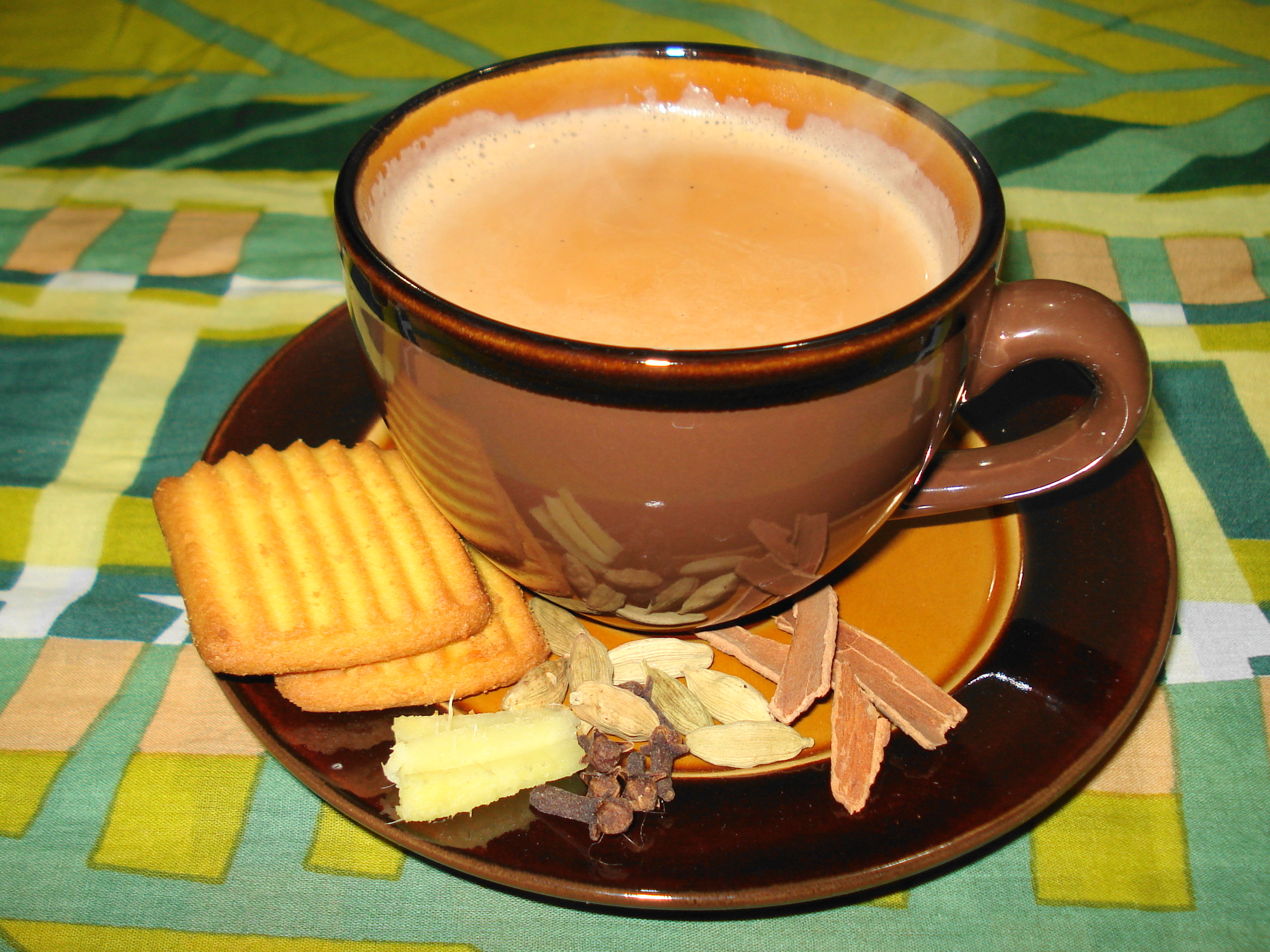
Northern India's most popular way to drink tea, masala chai, served with tea biscuits

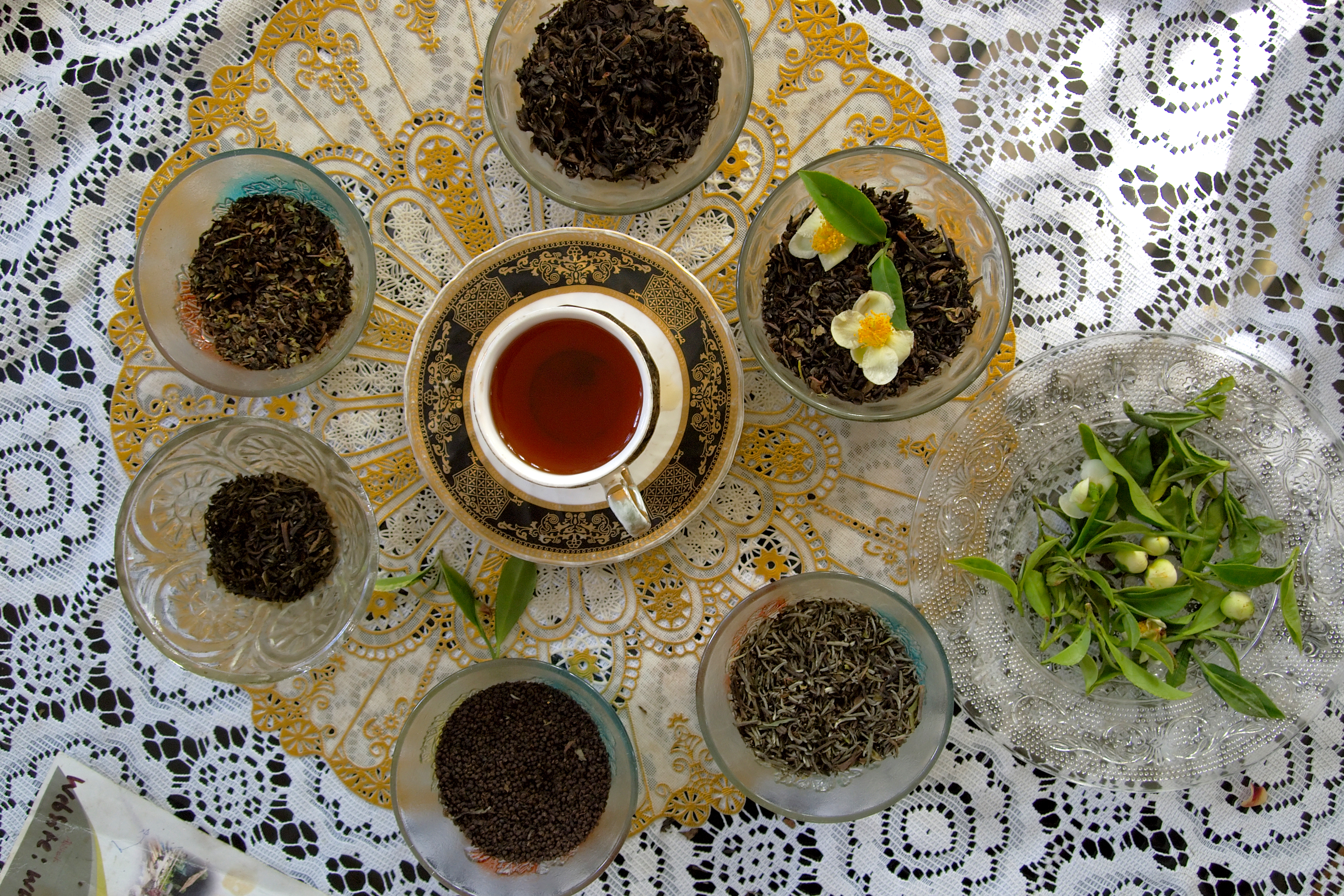
A cup of Darjeeling tea

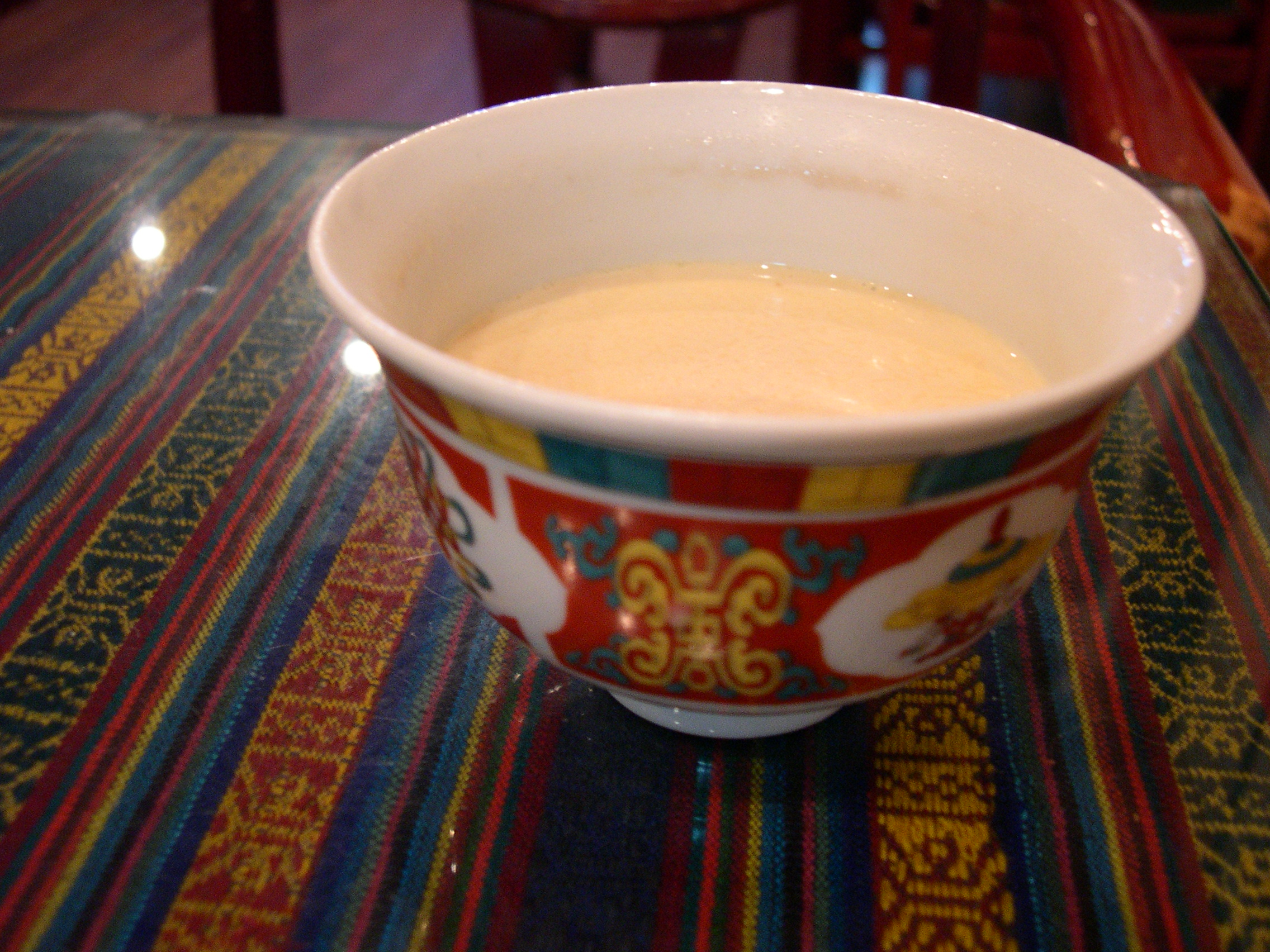
Butter tea or gur gur in the Ladakhi language, in a bowl; popular in Himalayan regions of India, particularly in Ladakh, Sikkim, and Arunachal Pradesh.

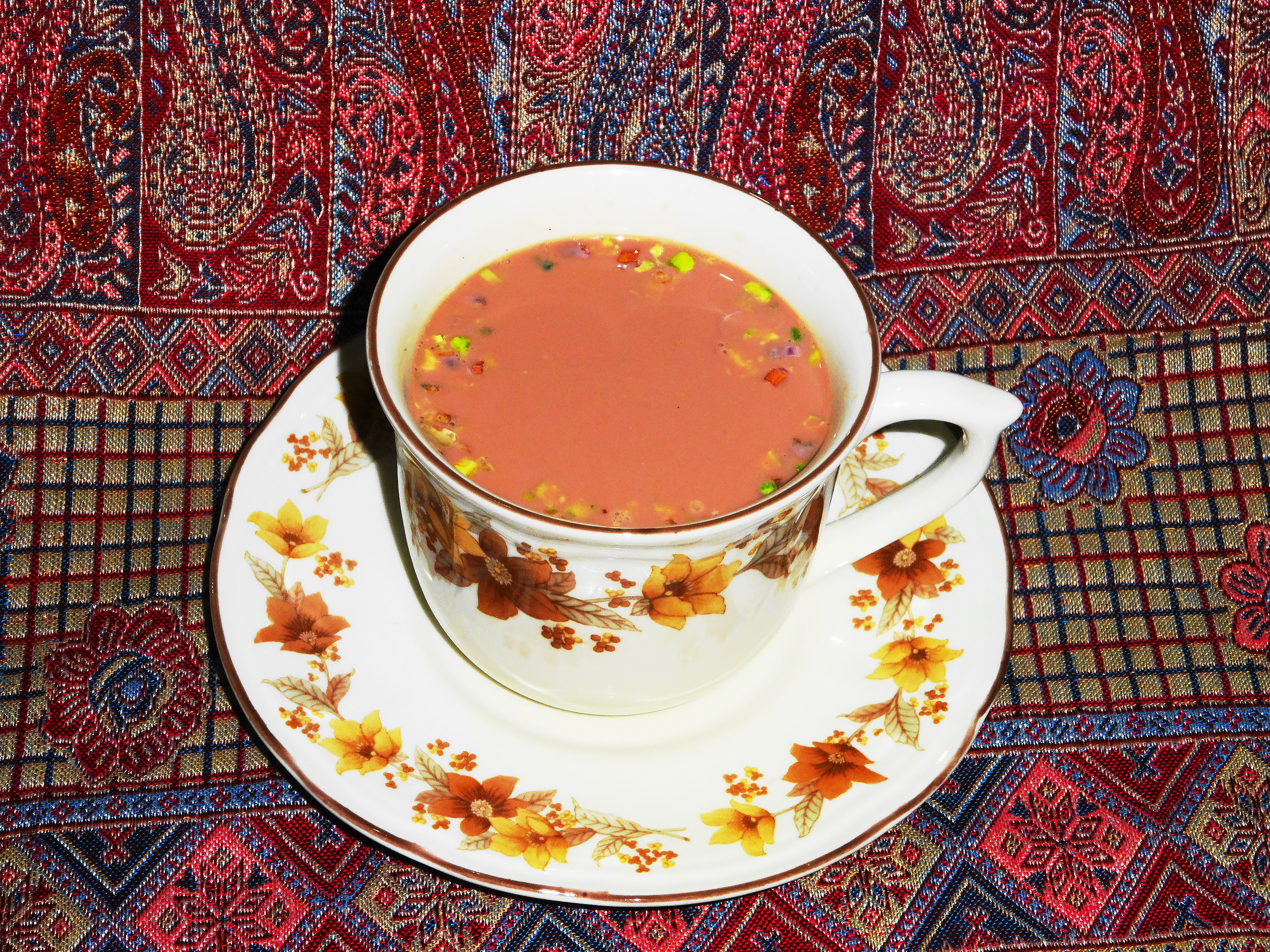
Noon chai, popular tea drink in the Kashmir Valley, Jammu and Kashmir

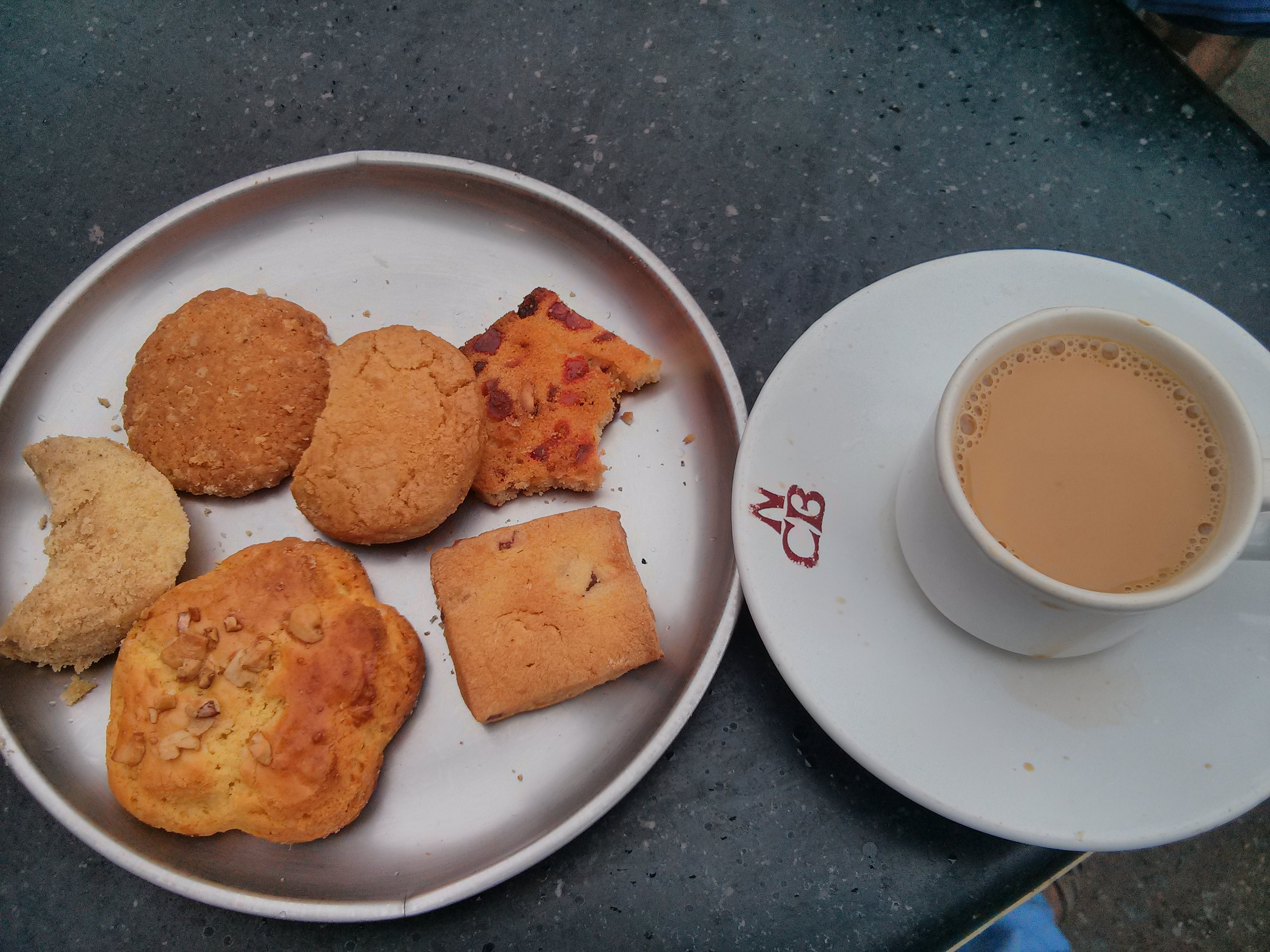
Irani chai and Osmania biscuits as served in Hyderabad

According to National Sample Survey Organisation data, India consumes 15 times more tea than coffee. Tea is made both at home and outside. Outside the home, tea is most commonly and easily found at the tea stalls that dot just about every street in India. Post the success of coffee chains of Barista and Cafe Coffee day, the tea stall has become a part of the urban landscape with several tea themed cafe chains taking root in metro cities in recent years. Tea is now a cultural institution, even celebrated as in the recent art exhibition titled "Chai Wallah and other stories" by the artist Vijay Gille. "Chai Wallah" is the Hindi title accorded to the man who runs the tea stall. The 2014 general elections also saw the election of Narendra Modi who worked for his father's tea stall as a child. The phrase "Chai-Pani" literally meaning, tea and water, is used to offer welcome drinks and facilitate guests in houses of India.

According to the historian Lizzi Collingham, the taste for tea was developed in India through a dedicated push on the part of the producers of tea once tea production in India gained momentum. Initially, free samples of tea were offered from horse-drawn carts belonging to various companies. As early as 1907, Brooke Bond, an English tea company started experimenting with a fleet of horse-drawn vans for distributing teas. The British tradition of taking tea with a little milk and sugar was introduced along with the samples.

Unlike the British cup of tea, tea in India is not served in a set where the leaves are steeped separately. Typically, tea in India is consumed with both milk and sugar but the tea leaves are not prepared separately by being steeped. Instead, the tea leaves are boiled along with additions and then boiled again after the addition of milk and sugar. Sometimes the tea leaves themselves are used as flavouring. In many parts of the country, the most special tea is one where the tea leaves are boiled solely in milk.

There are many other popular variations depending on regional and cultural affiliations. By and large, tea drinkers in India drink milk tea. In Southern India, Masala Chai is not popular; instead, tea brewed with milk and sugar is the prime beverage. Popular tea brews in Assam are Sah, Ronga Sah (red tea without milk) and Gakhir Sah (milk tea). In West Bengal and Bangladesh it is called Cha. In Hindi speaking north India, popular tea brews are Masala Chai, Kadak Chai (typically a feature of the mountain community of North India, this is a very strongly brewed tea, almost to the point of bitterness), Malai Mar Ke Chai (where a generous dollop of full fat cream is spooned into the cup of tea) are some of the more popular variations.

== Gallery ==
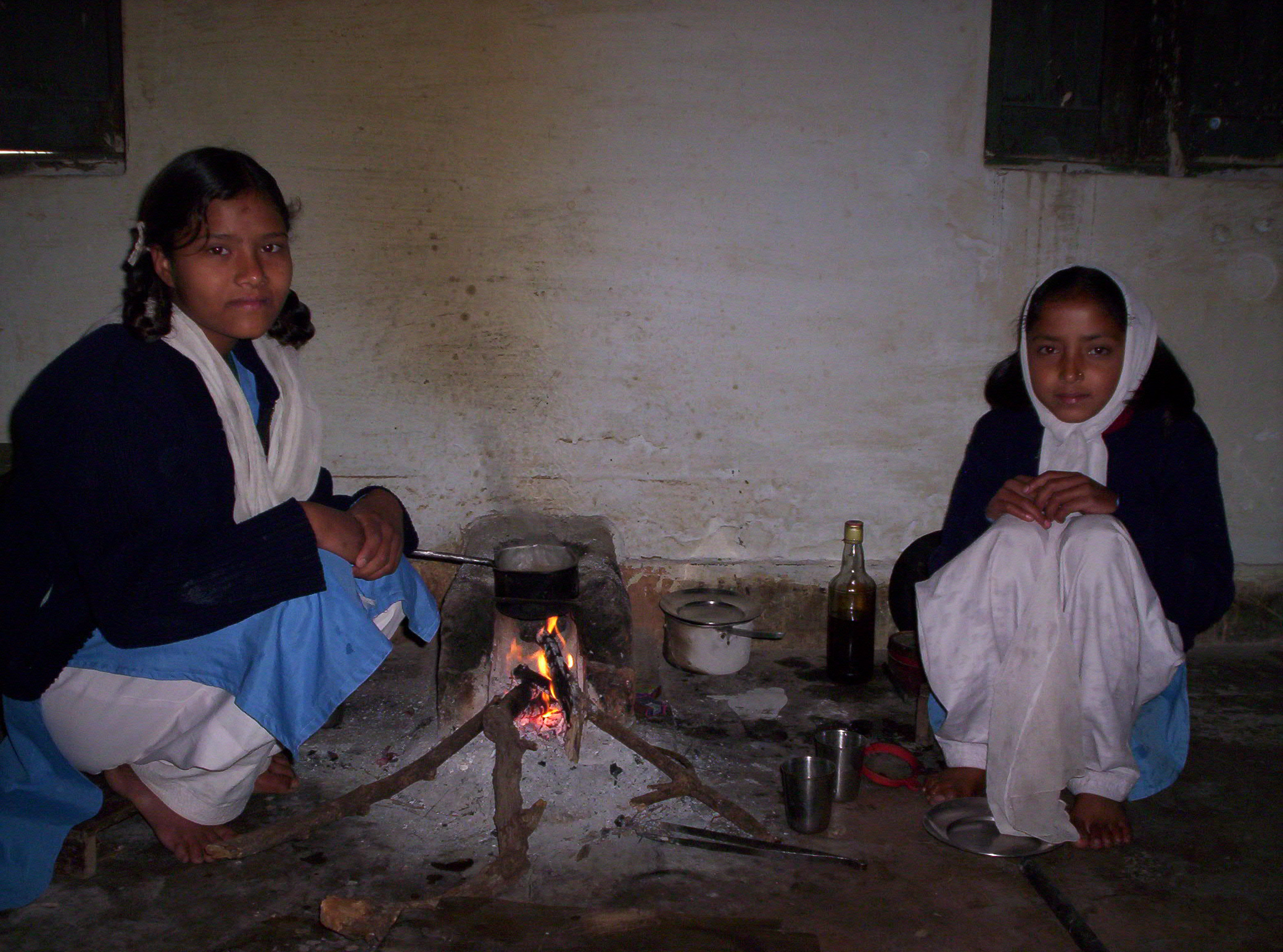
Indian schoolgirls in their uniforms making tea over an open fire

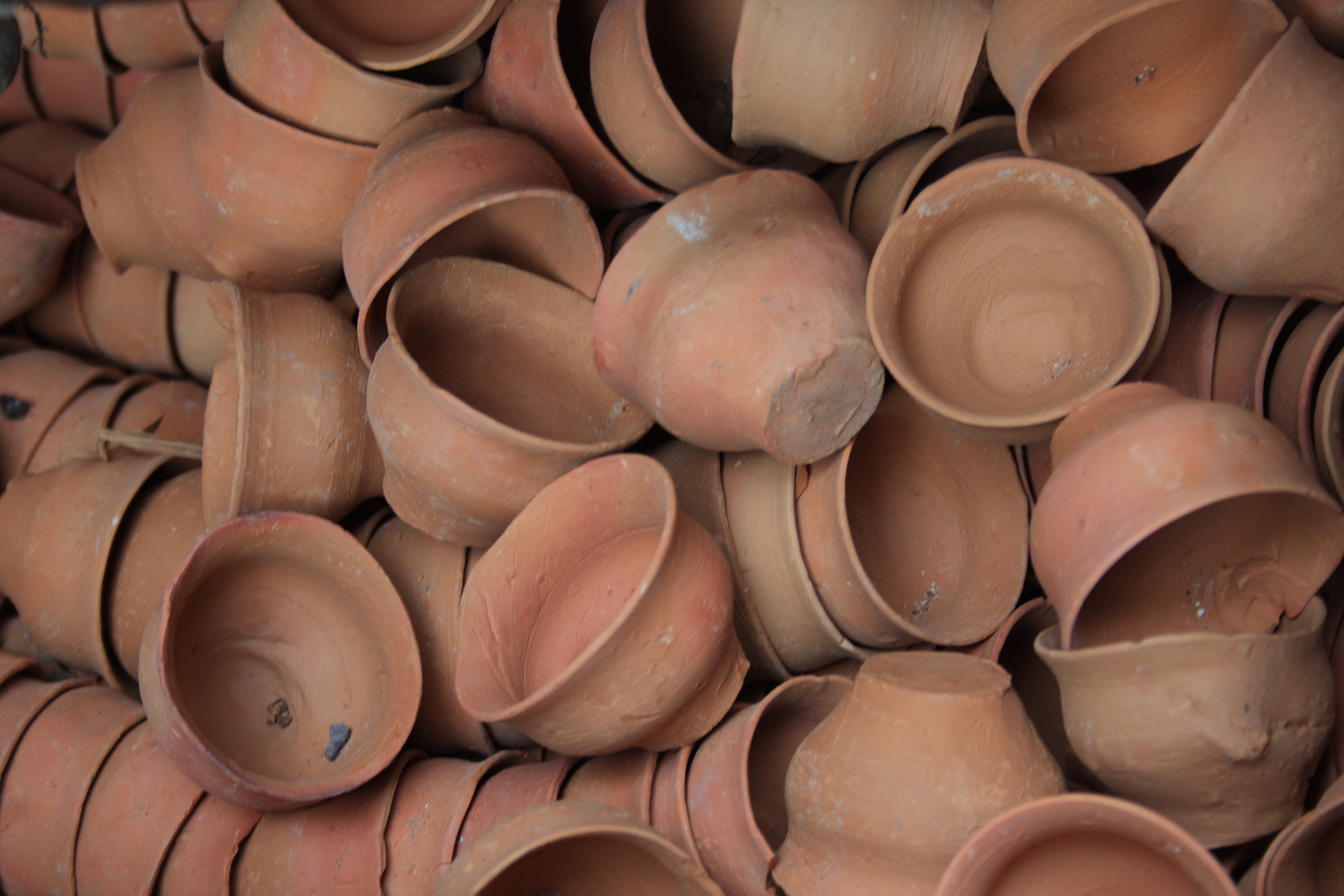
Indian red clay teacups, unglazed, are used by some vendors.

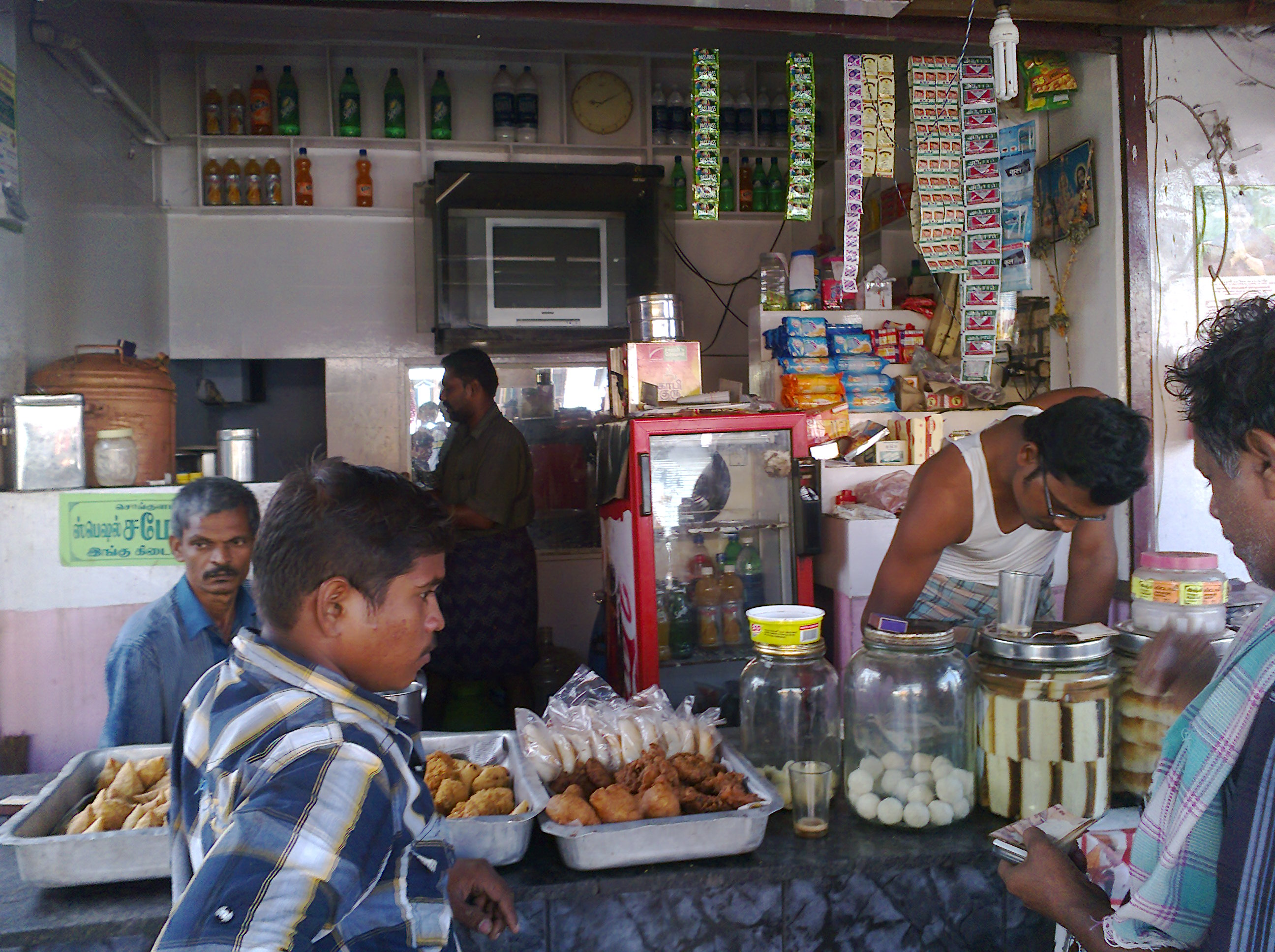
An Indian tea shop with a variety of fresh snacks on offer

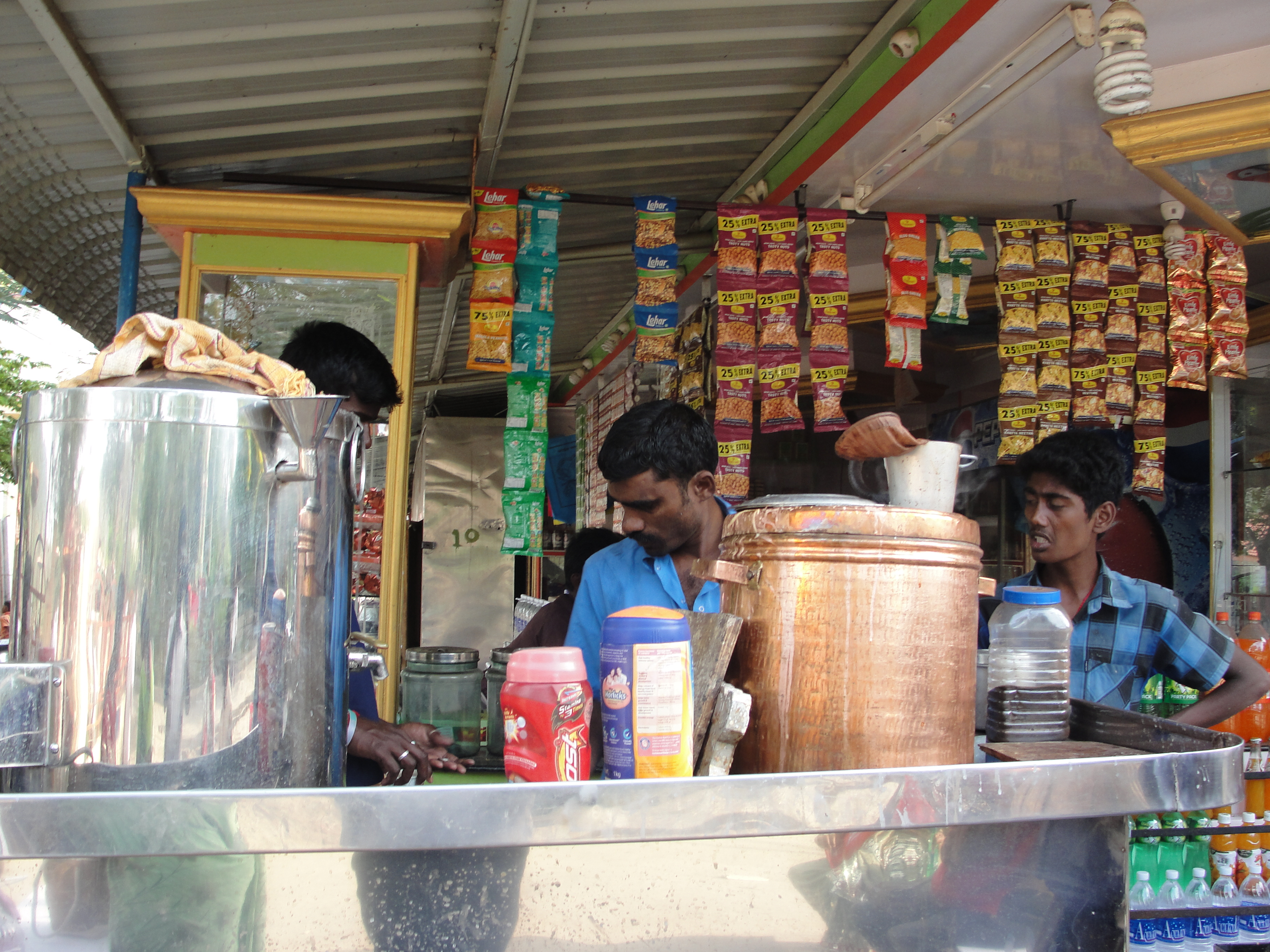
A tea stall in Hokenakal, Dharmapuri district, Tamil Nadu

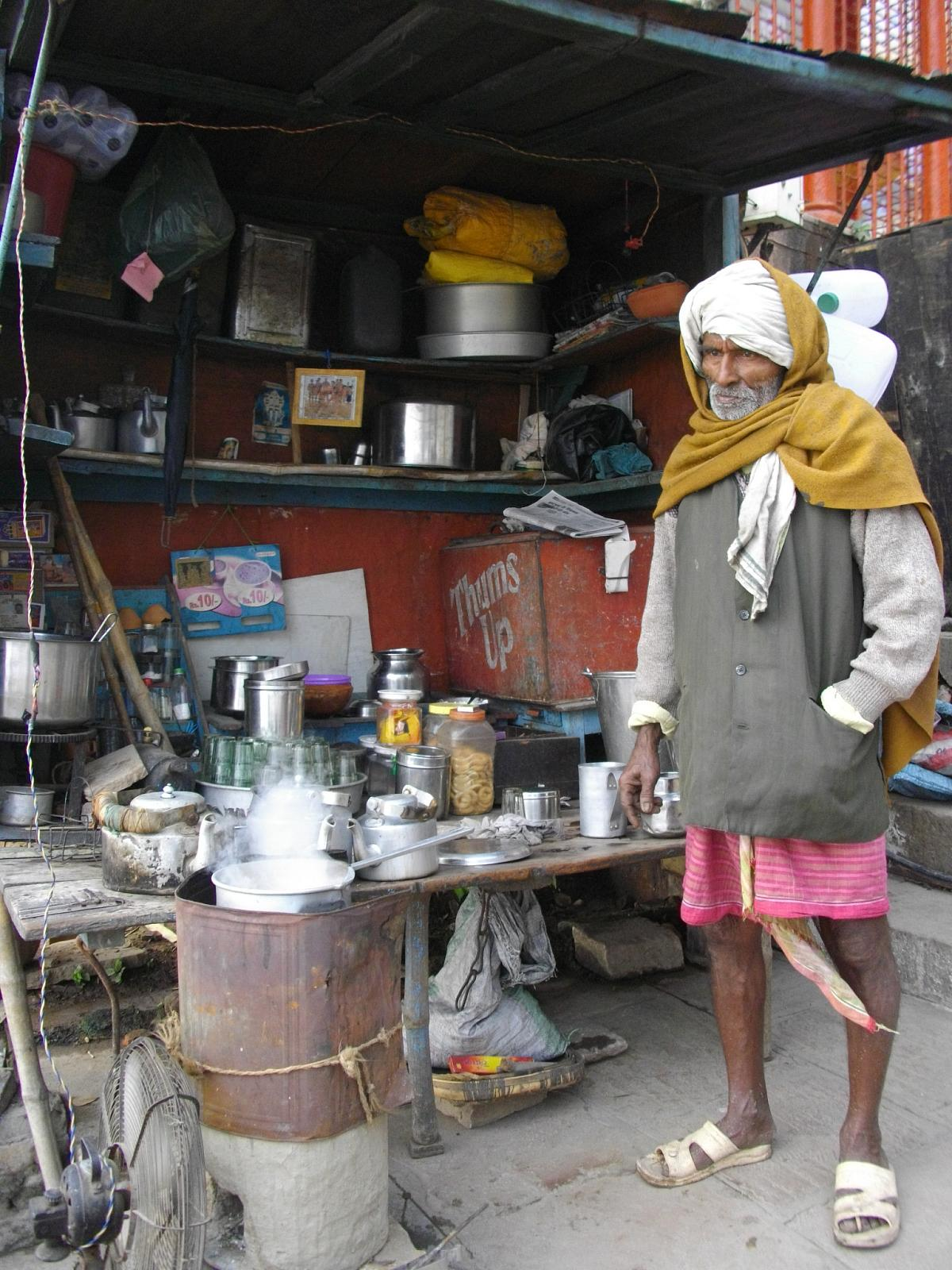
Chaiwala at a stall in Varanasi; a pot of chai is on the stove, and a tray of clean glasses is visible on the table in the background.

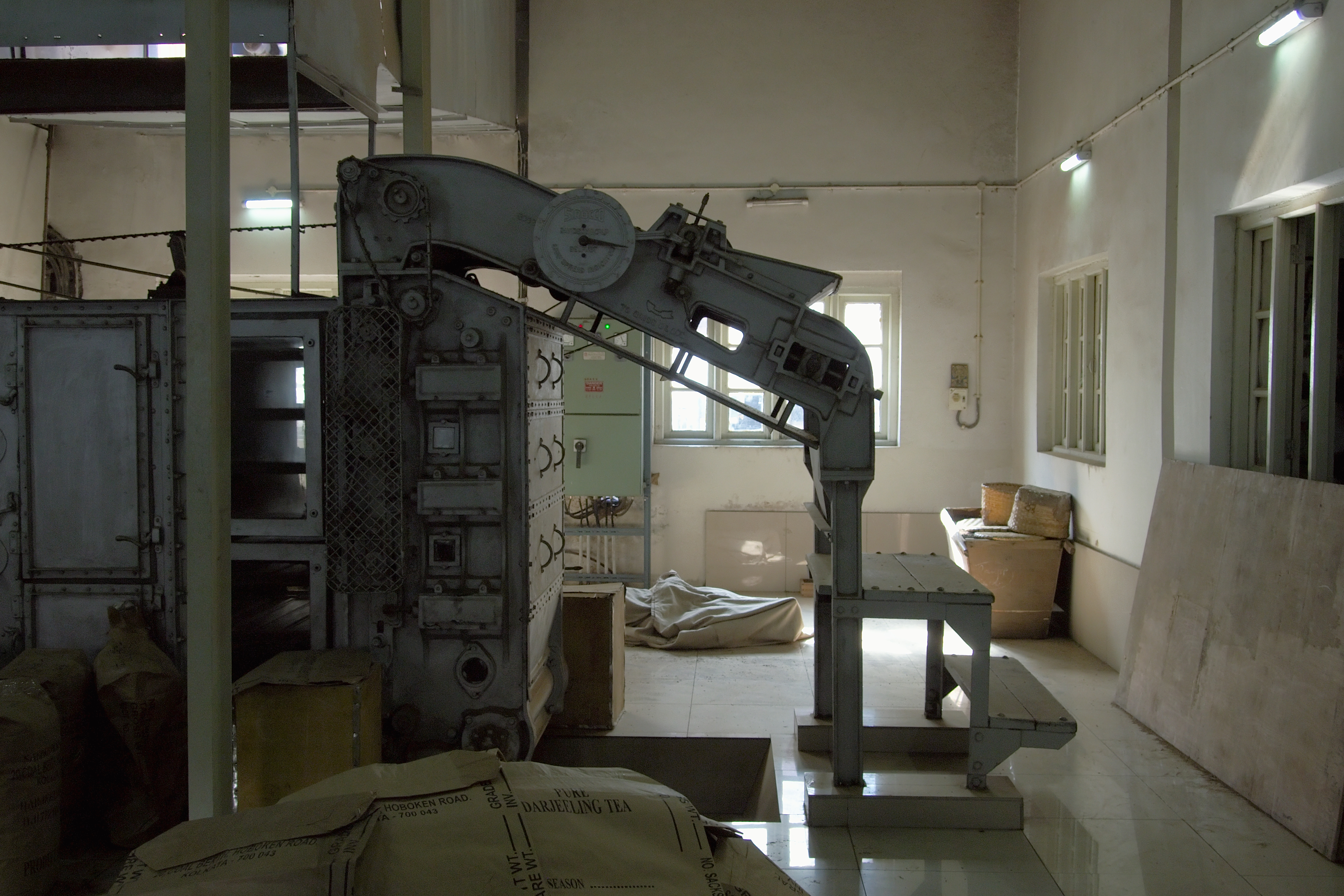
Tea factory in Darjeeling

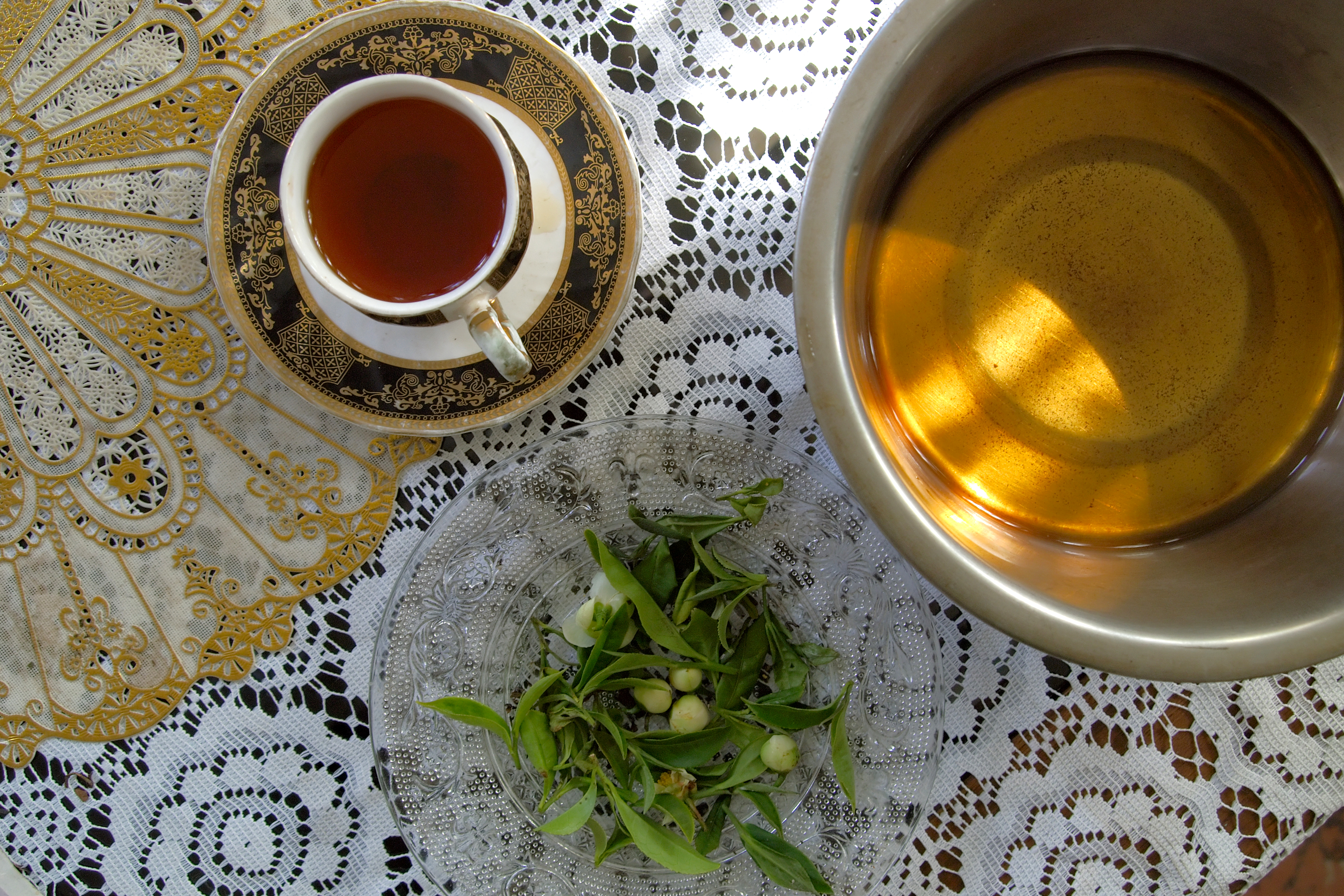
Cups of Darjeeling tea

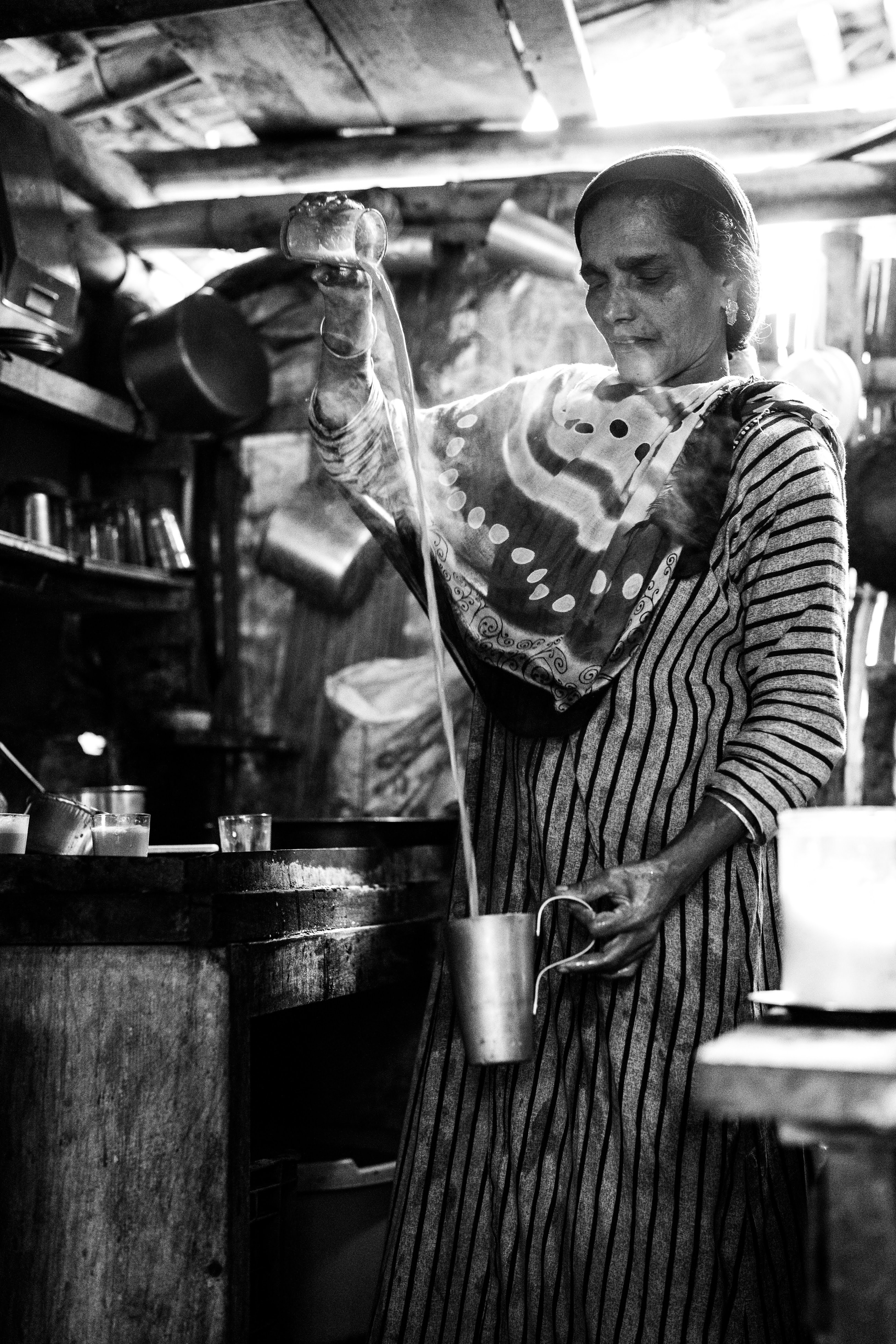
South Indian lady, preparing a cup of morning tea in the traditional South Indian way

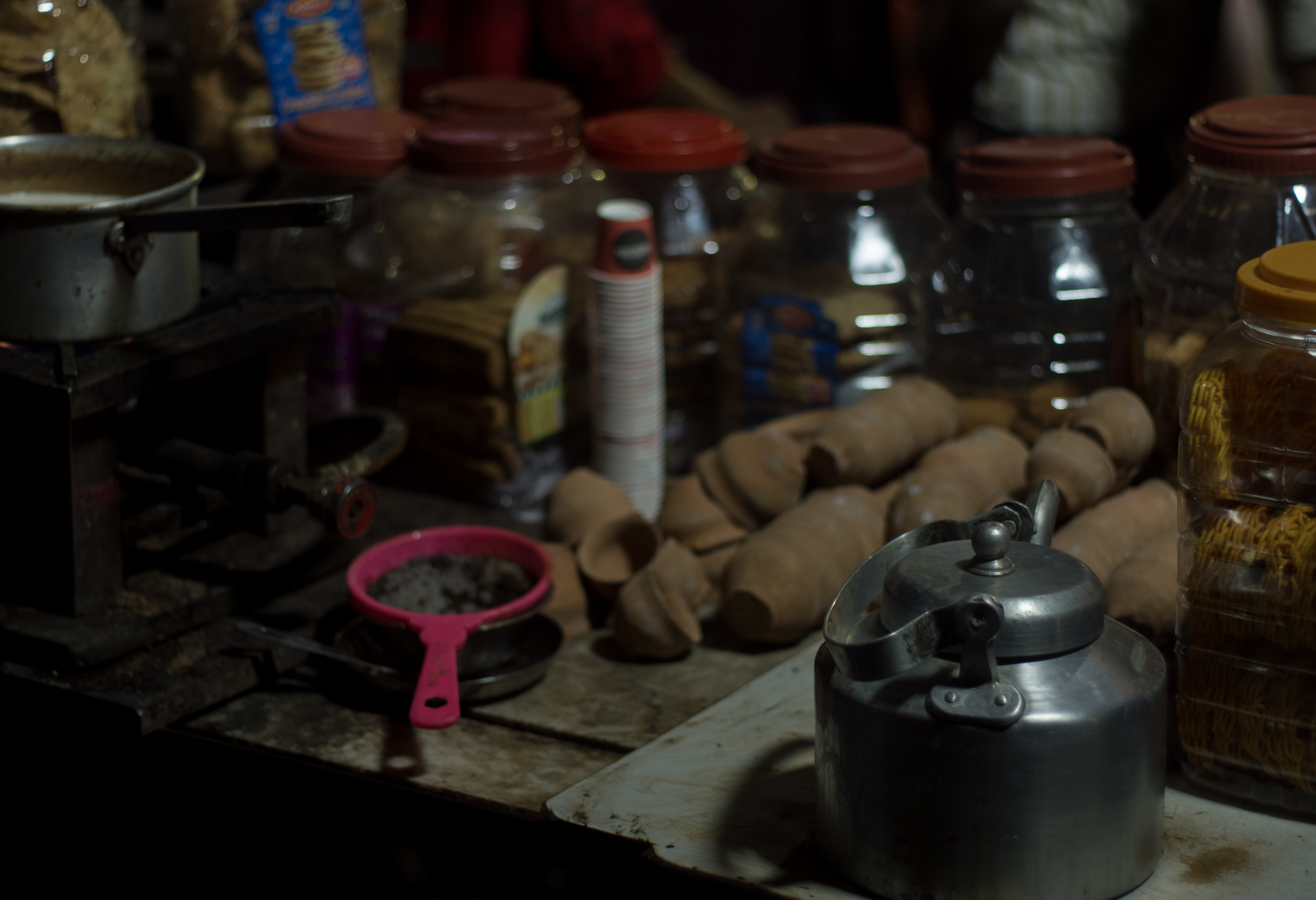
Inside view of a tea stall in Kolkata, India

== See also ==
- Café Coffee Day
- Crush, Tear, Curl, or CTC, a method of processing black tea popular in India
- Tea Auction Centre of Assam
- History of tea in India
- Limtex
- List of trade unions in Indian tea gardens
- Nilgiri tea
- Tata Tea
- Tea-tribes
- Tocklai Experimental Station

== Bibliography ==
- Kiple, Kenneth F.; Ornelas, Kriemhild Coneè, eds. (2000). The Cambridge World History of Food. Cambridge University Press. ISBN 9780521402149.
- Sanyal, s (2008). "Tea Tourism: A Concept That's Catching On". The Hindu Business.
