= Tinkitam =

- town
- Location in Sikkim, India Tinkitam (India)
- Coordinates: 27°14′0″N 88°19′32″E
- Country: India
- State: Sikkim
- District: Namchi

Government
  - Type: Municipal corporation
  - Body: Nagar Palika

Languages
  - Official: Nepali, Bhutia, Lepcha, Limbu, Newari, Rai, Gurung, Mangar, Sherpa, Tamang and Sunwar
- Time zone: UTC+5:30 (IST)
- Vehicle registration: SK

Tinkitam is a small town in Namchi, India. The town is located 45 minutes from the district headquarters Namchi. The town is being promoted as a tourist destination. Mount Kanchenjanga is near the town.

The local area contains rare species of orchids and Paphiopedilum Faireanum and other orchids of the Cypripedioideae genus, also called "lady's slipper". Most orchids near this village are terrestrial, blooming in October and November. Nearby are the Temi Tea Gardens, the only tea estate of Sikkim. Tinkitam offers a view of a dormant volcano that one can come across during the trek from Damthang to Tendong National Park.

The economy of this town mainly concerns its cardamom plantations. Locals are mostly of Bhutia and Nepali ancestry. Nepali is the predominant language. The town has a temperate climate.

== Notable people ==
Tinkitam was the birthplace of Indian football captain Baichung Bhutia. Many members of his family continue to live in the village. It is also the birthplace of the first female IAS officer from South Sikkim who is an Economic (Hons) graduate from St.Stephens (Delhi University), Tshering Yangden Bhutia. It is also the birthplace of Norbu Dadul Bhutia who was the first elected Zilla Adhyakshya of South Sikkim after the State of Sikkim enacted the Sikkim Panchayat Act in 1993.
