= Zarung =

- Village
- Location within Sikkim Location within India
- Coordinates: 27.307°N 88.320°E
- Country: India
- State: Sikkim
- District: Namchi
- Tehsil: Ravong
- Time zone: UTC+5.30 (Indian Standard Time)

Zarung is a village located in Namchi, India. It belongs to the Ravong Tehsil of South Sikkim.

== Demographics ==
The total population of Zarung village is 874. 468 are males and 406 are females, thus the average male to female sex ratio is 868, where's the child sex ratio of the village is 831. According to the 2011 Indian census the literacy rate of Zarung is 66.4 percent which is lower literacy rate compared to 72.7 percent of South Sikkim.
