= Bikmat =

Coordinates: 27°09′N 88°27′E

- Village
- Interactive map of Bikmat
- Country: India
- State: Sikkim
- District: South Sikkim
- Tehsil: Namchi
- Time zone: UTC+5.30 (Indian Standard Time)

Bikmat is a village located in the Sikkim state of India. The village belongs to the Namchi Tehsil of Namchi district.

== Demographics ==
According to the 2011 Indian census total 621 people reside in the village of which 327 are males and 294 are females. The literacy rate for males is 87.90 percent and for female, it is 79.01 percent.

== Education ==
The Central Board of Secondary Education affiliated "Bikmat ss school" serves as one of the educational institute in the village.
