= Sikkim Nationalised Transport =

Indian public transport corporation

- Type: State-owned
- Industry: Transport
- Predecessor: Sikkim State Transport (1944)
- Founded: 1944
- Headquarters: Yatayat Bhavan, Gangtok
- Area served: Sikkim; West Bengal
- Key people: Om Prakash Mathur (Governor of Sikkim); Prem Singh Tamang (Chief Minister of Sikkim); Madan Cintury (MLA and advisor); Manish Pradhan (Principal Chief Engineer cum-Secretary)
- Services: Bus service; Freight service; Rail service; Emergency relief service
- Owner: Government of Sikkim
- Website: Transport Department, Government of Sikkim

Sikkim Nationalised Transport (or SNT) (Note: also known as Sikkim Nationalised Transport Department) is a state-run transport department in the Indian state of Sikkim which manages the bus, rail, and road transport services in and out of the state. Introduced in 1944 with a formal rebranding in 1955, the SNT is directly administered by the Sikkim government. Bus and rail reservations are available at SNT either manually or via online mode. Additionally, the department provides services to the Indian Army by buses, and for transporting goods, fuel, and army personnel by trucks. Its headquarters are located at Yatayat Bhavan in Gangtok, Sikkim.

== History ==
Organized vehicular transport in Sikkim began in 1944 with it being managed by the kingdom's transport department known as Sikkim State Transport (SST).

Later in 1955, the SST was rebranded to Sikkim Nationalised Transport Department (SNT). Unlike other state transports in India, Sikkim's state transport is managed by its state government.

Since 1975, passengers and goods services are also managed by the union government according to the Central Motor Vehicles Act of 1988. SNT is one of the eight State Transport Undertakings (STU) which were being departmentally managed as early as the 1950s.

For the Darjeeling Bandh in 2012, the state government had prepared 50 supply trucks for emergency use to transport essential commodities.

During the COVID-19 lockdown in India, SNT provided essential goods and passenger services including health workers and army personnel in and out of the state. A total of 20 trucks, 30 tankers, and 70 buses were deployed for this purpose.

In 2022, the Sikkim government introduced two new bus services, one to Lake Tsomgo and the other to Baba Mandir, both of which are located at a distance of 40 to 45 kilometres (25 to 28 mi) from Gangtok. In the same year, it was found that SNT's buses are not accessible for Persons with Disabilities (PwD). Two years later, SNT had introduced digital payment system (or cashless payment) for all of its bus passengers.

In an incident that took place in September 2022, a SNT bus was torched by an angry mob after the driver had fatally crashed a motorcyclist on the Sevoke stretch of Gangtok-Siliguri highway. The passengers including the driver were unharmed, and the latter was taken into custody.

On May 2026, during the fuel crisis, all SNT buses were unaffected by the new policy brought in by the state government.

== Fleet ==
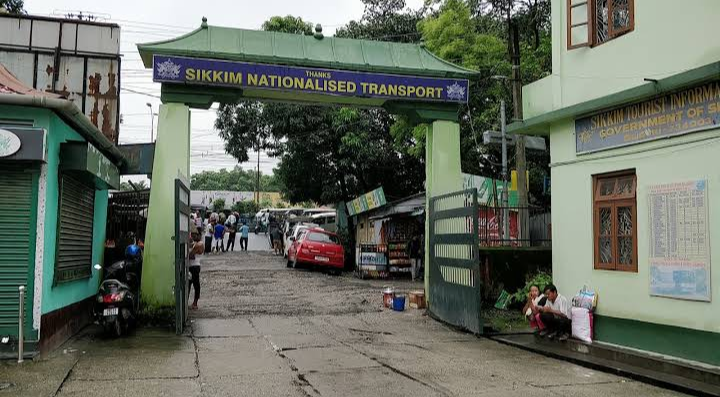
Picture of SNT Bus Terminus, Siliguri

There are four depots located in Sikkim which are used by the SNT for passengers, fuel, and goods transportation. Among them, Gangtok Depot is the largest as well as the busiest depot with a fleet capacity of 70 buses, and is located at an elevation of 5,400 ft (1,600 metres) above sea level. Other service departments included in Gangtok Depot are Passengers Railway Services (PRS) Head Office, Central Traffic Workshop at Jalipool, and SNT offices at Mangan, Pakyong, and a Goods Office at Tadong.

The other three depots operated by SNT are Rangpo Depot in which trucks and tankers (or freight) are managed; Jorethang Depot which covers Namchi, Soreng, and Gyalshing districts; Siliguri depot which is the only depot outside Sikkim, and which manages goods and passenger transportation in and out of the state.

== Services ==
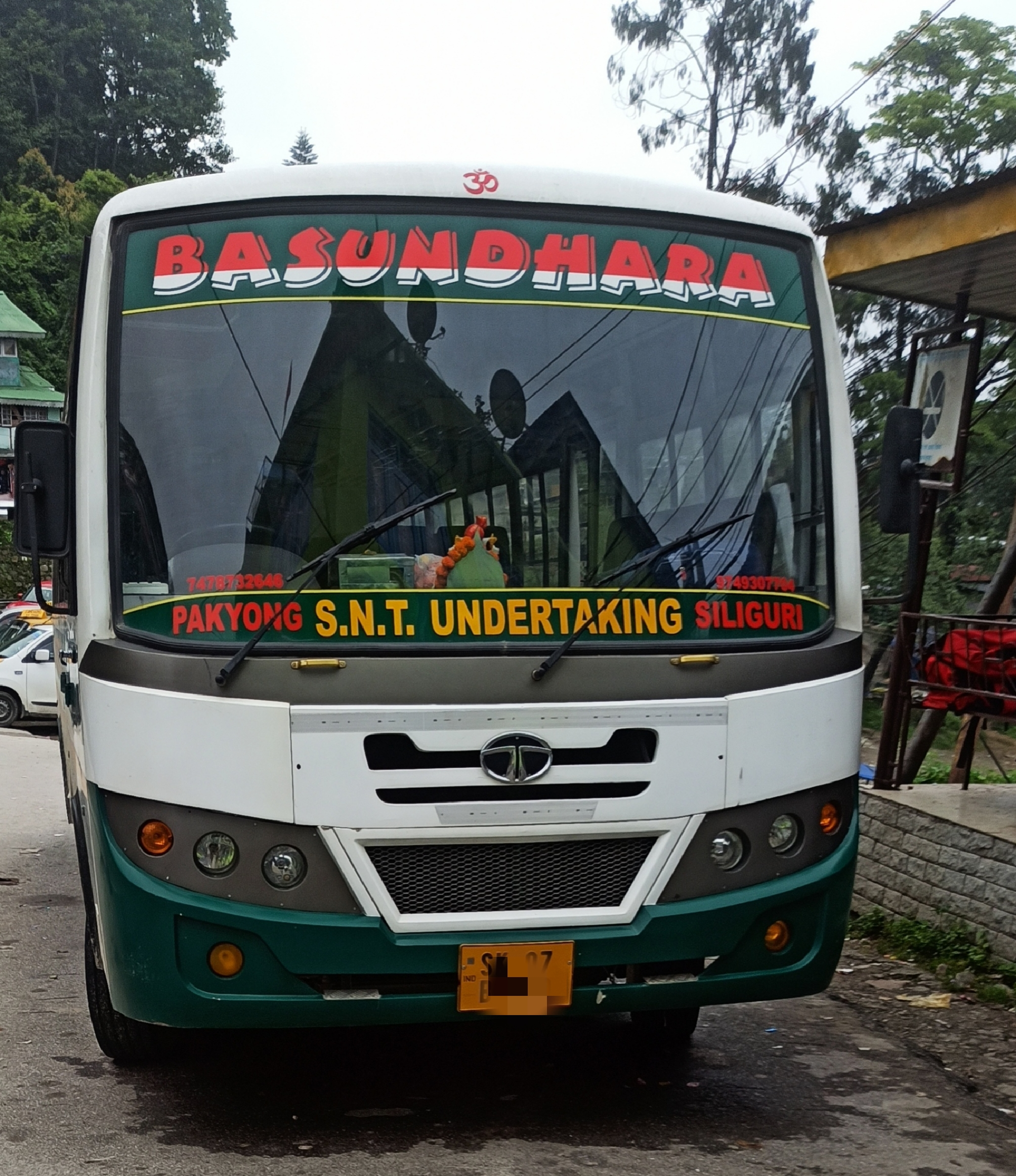
A SNT bus travelling from Pakyong to Siliguri

For bus services, currently there are 13 booking offices (or bus stations) available in (or out of) Sikkim which are namely–Gangtok, Siliguri, Jorethang, Rangpo, Namchi, Rhenock, Singtam, Ravangla, Gyalshing, Mangan, Chungthang, Melli, and Sombaria. In several of these bus stations and the buses operating under it, the passengers get amenities such as insurance coverage, canteens, phone booths, toilets, home guards (currently only available at Gangtok and Silguri), manual and confirmed ticket reservations. A monthly lottery is also held for the bus passengers for which the results are declared in Gangtok booking office and are published in the Sikkim Herald. Buses are also provided for transporting Indian Army personnel to Zeema, Rangmarange, Lachen, Lachung, and Serathang.

For Siliguri to Gangtok, with a ticket price of Rs 150 per passenger, buses are available at the Siliguri bus station in between 6:30 am to 3:30 pm (IST). Private jeep-taxis are also available on this route for ferrying passengers.

For freight services, SNT has contracts with the Indian Army and the General Reserve Engineer Force (GREF). The trucks and tankers carry goods and fuel, and transport it from Siliguri to the border areas of Sikkim smoothly. Private trucks are also utilized for this purpose. For more than 80 per cent of the carriage works for National Hydroelectric Power Corporation (NHPC), SNT's freight services are used such as in Legship Hydel project and Teesta-V power station project.

In case of road accidents, an ex gratia of Rs 3 lakhs is paid towards the deceased's family by the Government of Sikkim.
