= Sikkim tea =

Tea farming in Sikkim, India

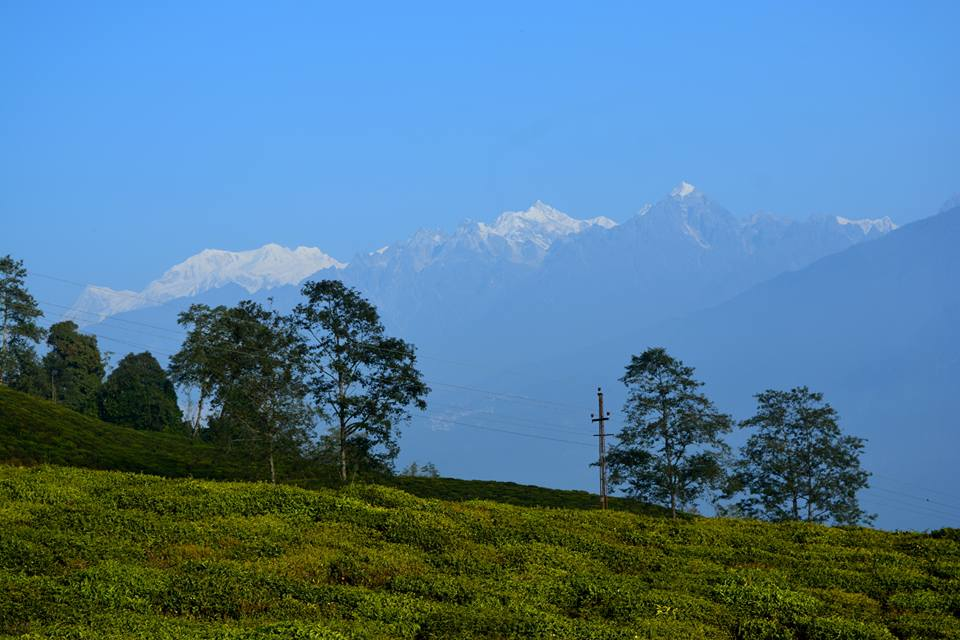
- Origin: Sikkim, India

Sikkim tea is a variety of tea grown in the state of Sikkim, India. Sikkim tea is not as widespread in use as the neighboring Darjeeling tea, however it has recently gained more popularity due to the increasing demand for organic products. The tea is mostly sold under the marketing name 'Temi tea'. Unlike Darjeeling tea, Sikkim tea has yet to receive a GI tag.

== History ==
Tea farming in Sikkim is primarily dominated by the Temi Tea Garden (owned by the Sikkim state government) and various other small tea growers. The first and still the largest tea garden in Sikkim, the Temi Tea Garden was established by the erstwhile king Palden Thondup Namgyal as a source of employment for the large number of Tibetan refugees living in the region.

== Tea characteristics ==
The first flush of Sikkim tea is harvested during springtime and has a unique taste and aroma. The tea is golden in color and has a light floral finish. It has a slightly sweet taste. Sikkim tea has a toasty and strong flavour. The third flush (also called Monsoon Flush) is full-bodied and has a mellow taste. The final flush (or Autumn Flush) of the Sikkim tea has a well-rounded taste and the slight hint of warm spices.

== Production and sale ==
The temperate weather and altitude of the state favor tea cultivation and the tea is known for its distinct flavor and aroma. Sikkim produces two varieties of tea, a China variety and a clone variety. The clone variety is a newy introduced cultivar with the China variety being grown traditionally. Sikkim, with its only garden and few other small growers, produces an estimated 0.5 million kg of tea annually. The usual produce is Black Tea, while a delicate white tea manufactured from the buds and unfurled new leaves is also grown to order. A green tea, known for its flowery flavor; and the Oolong tea are also produced.

Approximately 75 per cent of tea produced in Sikkim is sold via the Kolkata auction center while the remaining is packaged for local sale. The tea is popular in the international market due to being completely organic. Major importers are Germany, United States, France, Canada, and Japan. The first flush of the season 2023 Temi tea was sold for a price of Rs 10,250 per kg to buyers in Italy and Korea. The organic status of tea produced in the state has been certified by the Institute for Market Ecology (IMO), a member group of IMO Switzerland.

== Tea estates ==
- Bermiok is a boutique tea garden was established in the year 2002 by Mr. Tashi Densapa. The estate is spread over 15 acres at an elevation of 2500 ft to 3200 ft. The completely organic garden is one of the youngest in tea history. Due to the garden being young, the liquors from here are more floral and woody with a fresh aroma. Most of the garden is planted with Chinary bushes with patches of TV1 and TV2 clonal bushes. Currently, the estate is being managed by Mr. Nikhil Pradhan and his partner Mrs. Dolka Densapa. The estate produces around 1200 kg of tea in a year.
- Temi Tea Garden, founded in 1969, is the oldest and the only government run estate in the state. The estate has a plantation area of 440 acres, originating from Tendong Hill.

The 100% organic teagarden was certified and recognized by the IMO control board of India in the year 2017.

== Medicinal uses ==
Significant inhibitory activity, caused by hot water extract of black tea of Sikkim variety, has been observed against carrageenin, histamine, serotonin, and prostaglandin-induced pedal inflammation. The extract also inhibited exudative inflammation, cotton pellet-induced granuloma formation and adjuvant-induced polyarthritis. The extract has also shown significant inhibition against glucose oxidase-mediated inflammation. The observations have established the efficacy of this particular variety of black tea in the chronic phase of inflammation.
