= Tribal Rain =

Nepali music band from Sikkim (2013–present)

- Origin: Namchi, Sikkim, India
- Genre: Nepali Acoustic Experimental
- Years active: 14 October 1989-Present
- Members: Kenneth Adhikari; Prawes Lama; Sushant Ghatani.
- Past members: Rahul Rai

Tribal Rain is a Nepali acoustic experimental band from Sikkim, India. The band released their first album—Roka Yo Samay in 2017. Bhanai, Chinta and Narisawna are some of their popular songs.

== Formation and debut album ==
The band was formed in 2013 by Rahul Rai, Kenneth Adhikari, Prawes Lama, and Sushant Ghatani. Rai served as the lead vocalist and guitarist, while Lama played the guitar, Ghatani the cajón, and Adhikari the keyboard.

They initially released a single titled Chinta, which was followed by two other singles Bhanai and Narisawna. In 2017 they released an album titled Roka Yo Samay, consisting of 11 tracks.

== Death of Rahul Rai ==
The music video of 'Bhanai' from the album 'Roka yo Samay' was set to be released on 14 February 2018, but Rahul Rai had died, therefore the music video was delayed. It is also featured on the Movie 'Tara- the lost star' which premiered on 14 June 2024. A documentary on the life of Rahul Rai was released on 14 April 2022.

== Discography ==
Roka Yo Samay (2017)

No.	Title	Length
1.	"Narisawana"	04:47
2.	"Hunude Je Hunuchha"	03:53
3.	"Roka Yo Samay"	04:45
4.	"Traditional Swang"	04:24
5.	"Chinta"	04:19
6.	"Sunyata"	03:51
7.	"Bhanai"	03:49
8.	"Kalo"	04:20
9.	"Laijaw Malai"	03:36
10.	"Manawata"	03:15
11.	"Jiunu Nai Hola"	03:55
