= Mamley Stromatolite Park =

Paleontological site near Namchi in South Sikkim district

- Interactive map of Mamley Stromatolite Park
- Location: Namchi, South Sikkim, India
- Coordinates: 27.15°N 88.35°E

National Geological Monuments of India
- Official name: Stromatolite bearing Dolomite / Limestone of Buxa Formation at Mamley
- Designated: 2014
- Designated by: Geological Survey of India

Mamley Stromatolite Park is a paleontological site near Namchi in South Sikkim district of the Indian state of Sikkim.

== Description ==
The site is located in Mamley near Namchi in South Sikkim district of the Indian state of Sikkim. The site was designated a National Geological Monument by the Geological Survey of India in 2014.

The site preserves stromatolites, created by algae, and dating to Precambrian on dolomites of the Buxa Formation of Proterozoic. In 2024, new stromatolites, dating to 1.5 Ga, were discovered on the site.
