= Limtex =

Indian tea producing company

- Industry: Tea Trading, Manufacturing, IT
- Founded: 1977
- Headquarters: Kolkata, Head Office; Mumbai; Cochin; Coonoor; Coimbatore; Siliguri; Kotagiri
- Area served: Worldwide
- Key people: Gopal Poddar (Chairman and Managing Director); Shankar Poddar (Director); Subhas Poddar (Director)
- Services: Tea Trading, Manufacturing and Exporting, IT
- Parent: under the control of Limtex (India) Ltd
- Website: limtex.com

Limtex is an Indian multinational company, headquartered in Kolkata, West Bengal, India and a subsidiary of Limtex Group. It exports $40 million in Indian tea annually. Limtex is the leading producer, manufacturer and exporter of Indian tea both in the domestic and international market. It also has an IT division - Limtex Infotech, which was formed in 2005.

== History ==
=== Formation & early years ===
The company was founded in 1977 by Gopal Poddar, who serves as the chairman and managing director of Limtex (India) Ltd. Limtex started as a small tea trading business with a turnover of Rs 1.02 lacs. Over time, it diversified into IT, tea trading, biscuit, and export industries.

== Annual turnover ==
After 25 years in business it has earned $21 million from tea export only, with overall growth rate 60%.

== Awards and nominations ==
Limtex won a "National Export Award" by then Indian Prime Minister A. B. Vajpayee. The nomination came from the Federation of Indian Export Organisations, in association with the Ministry of Commerce, Government of India. They received other export-related awards from various entities like the Ministry of Commerce, Banks, and Associations. The Limtex group was also honored with the prestigious status of "Star Trading House" by the Government of India.

== Limtex Group of Companies ==
- Limtex (India) Limited
- Limtex Agri Udyog Ltd.
- Limtex Tea & Industries Ltd.
- Limtex Industries Ltd.
- Limtex Infotech Ltd.
- Sujali Tea & Industries Ltd.
- Satyanarayan Tea Co. Pvt. Ltd.
- Green Card Developers Pvt. Ltd.
- Poddar Exports

== Official website ==
- Limtex
