= Temi Tea Garden =

Human settlement in India

Sikkim Tea Temi Tea
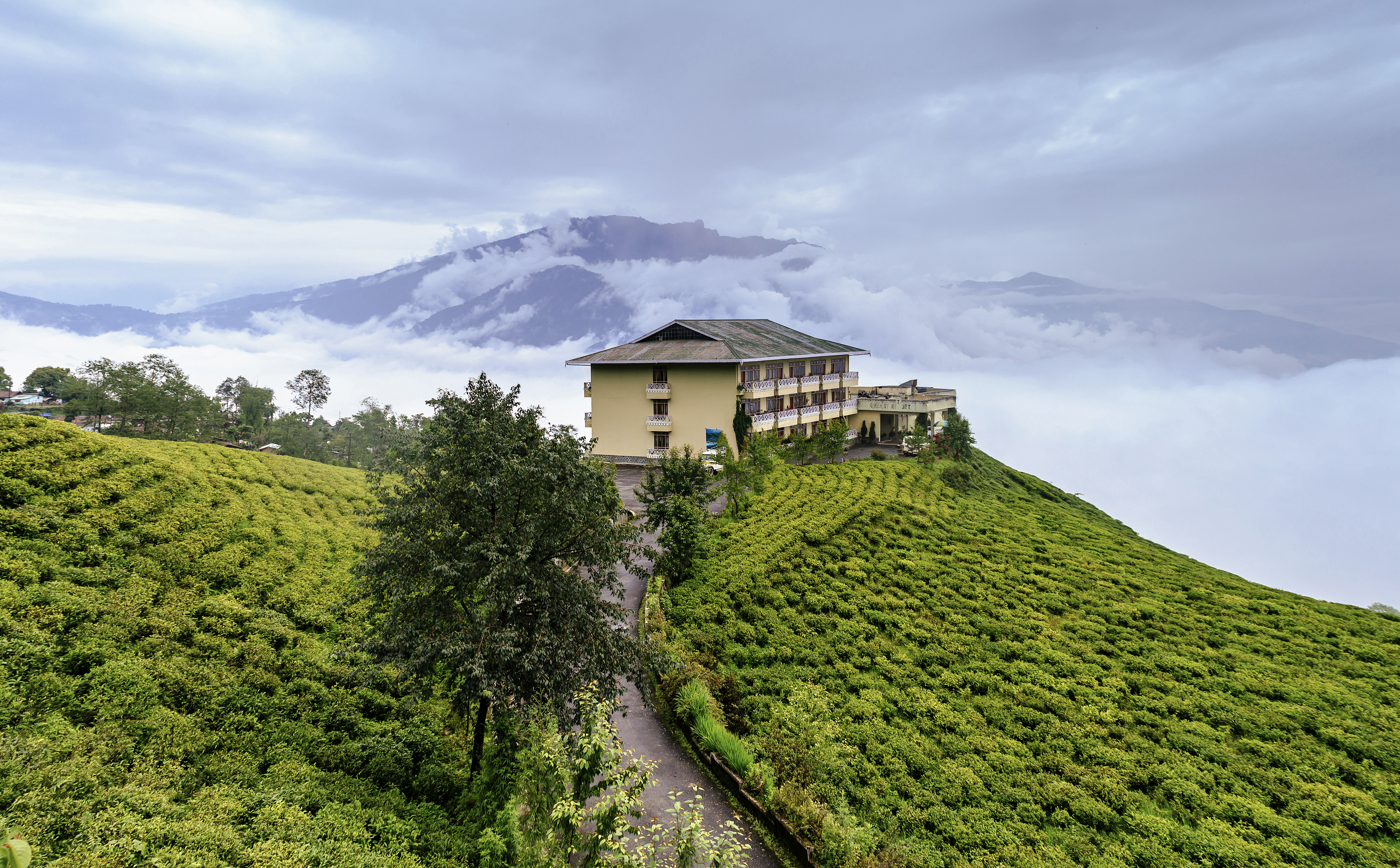
- Type: Temi Tea; Sikkim Soja; Sikkim Kanchendzonga Tea; Mystique
- Origin: Namchi, India
- Quick description: Rich aroma and taste

The Temi Tea Garden (27.2367°N 88.4222°E) in Temi, established in 1969 by the erstwhile King Palden Thondup Namgyal the last ruler of Sikkim, is located in Namchi in the northeastern Indian state of Sikkim. It is the only tea garden in Sikkim and is considered one of the best in India and the world. Top quality tea is produced, which is in demand in the international market. The garden is laid over a gradually sloping hill. The tea produced in this garden is also partly marketed under the trade name "Temi Tea".

The guidelines issued by the Institute of Marketology (IMO) of Switzerland to produce organic tea have been adopted in the Temi Tea Garden; a project initiated in April 2005 and nearing completion. In growing organic tea, agrochemicals are avoided by the tea estates that resulting in low production costs. Many European countries and Japan have shown a preference for tea produced by adopting the organic manuring method.

== Estate ==
The Temi Tea estate was established in 1969 covering an area of 177 hectares (440 acres). The lie of the land shows gentle slopes that originate from the Tendong hill range. The ground conditions indicate loamy soils with slope of 30–50%. The ground surface is subject to moderate erosion and is spread with reasonable degree of stones. The garden has 406 workers supported by a staff of 43. Its annual tea production is on an average about 100 tonnes. The estate functions under a Tea Board set up by the Government of Sikkim and under its aegis the ‘Sang-Martam Tea Growers' Cooperative Society’ has been established to promote growing of different varieties of quality tea."

Before the estate was created, the land was a Sherpa Village with around 10 acres of nurseries of the Forest Department around the Missionary Building which became the office cum residence of Divisional Forest Officer (South & West Division). During British rule this site was a landmark for Scottish missionary buildings in the early 20th century. The buildings were acquired by the Government of Sikkim in 1954.

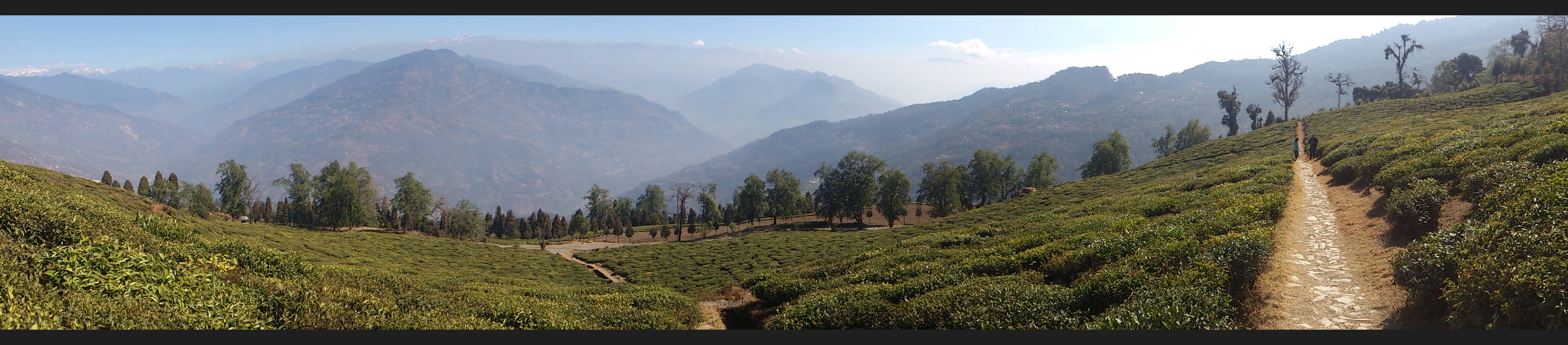
Temi Tea Garden panoramic view

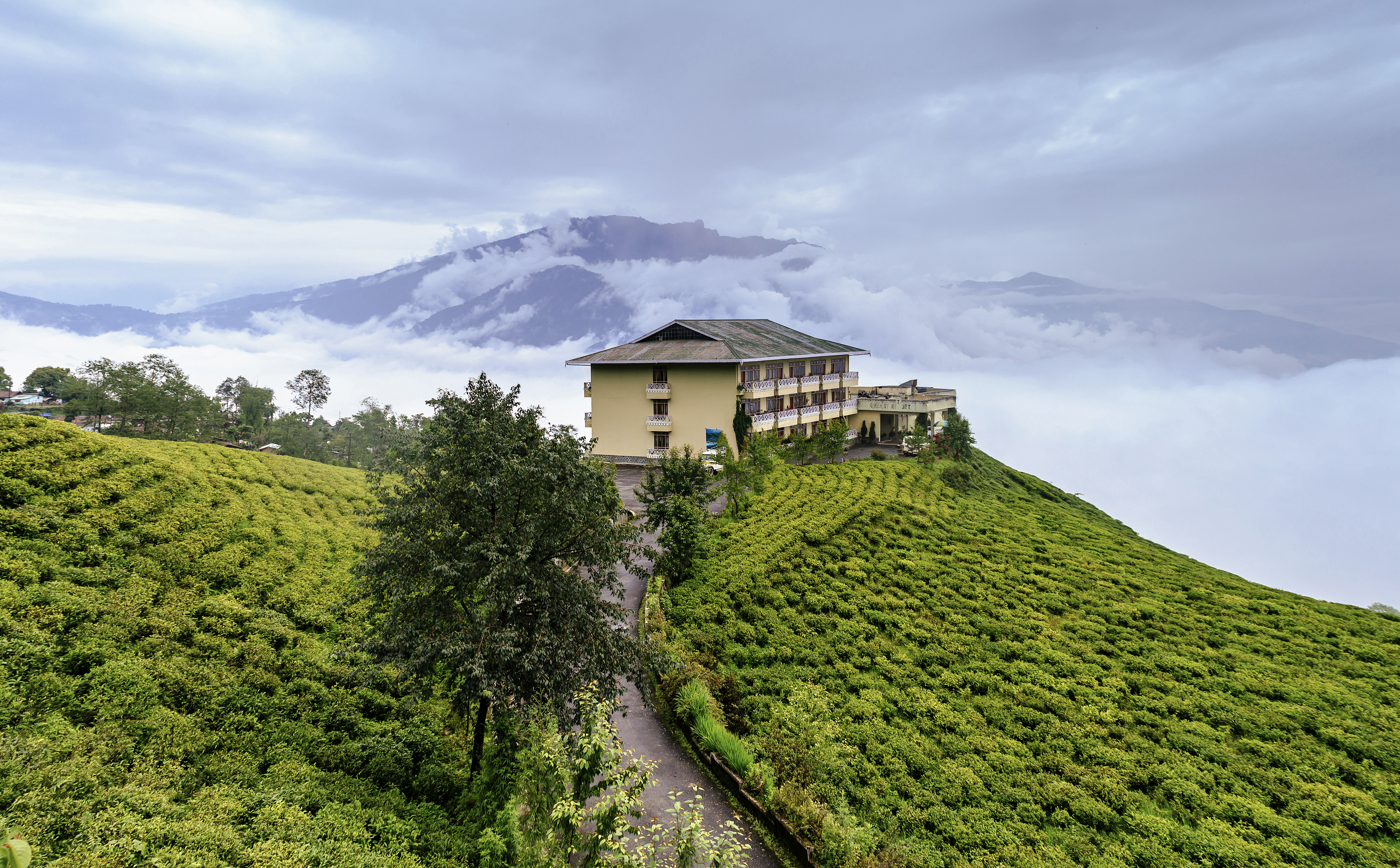
Cherry Resort inside Temi Tea Garden, Namchi, Sikkim

The floral composition of the tea estate consists of broad leaf vegetation comprising Alnus nepalensis (utis), Castanopsis (kattus), Macaranga (malata), Engelhardia spicata (mahua), Magnolia champaca, Toona ciliata (tooni), Machilus (kawla), Symplocos (kharane) and Cinnamomum (sinkoli). The estate's surroundings and approach road have also been made more scenic by planting japanese cedar (dhupi) and prunes (cherry).

Weeds identified in the estate are Eupatorium and Artemisia and other secondary growth. large cardamom plantations are also present in forest patches in the vicinity of the tea estate, apart from naturalized exotic Cryptomeria japonica patches.

Fauna includes species of the kalij and satyr tragopan; reptile species of Japalura lizards, cobra, krait and Himalayan pit viper and Asian bullfrog. Butterflies and leeches are also seen in the area.

This estate is also being promoted as a tourist destination with visitors getting the chance to visit the production facility.

== Temi Guest house ==
The Temi Tea Factory Guest house has 4 rooms that are available to tourists on pre-booking.

== Products ==
The tea produced by the Temi Tea estate are packaged (0.250 kilograms (0.55 lb) packages) under many brand names; the brand name "Temi Tea" is of the best quality consisting of pure tea "golden flowery orange pekoe #1 (TGOFP1)". The next in quality is the popular brand of 'Sikkim Solja' followed by 'Mystique' and 'Kanchanjunga Tea'. It is also sold in the form of 'Orthodox dust tea'. The Tea Garden Employees Consumers' Co-operative Society Ltd. markets these products at a kiosk in the vicinity of the Temi Tea factory. About 75% of the tea produced in this estate is auctioned in Kolkata and the balance 25% is marketed as packaged tea in the domestic market.

Organic tea

Tea production in this estate has been switched over from conventional method to 'Organic Method' according to the guidelines of the Institute of Marketecology (IMO) of Switzerland. This conversion initiated in 2005 is reported to have been completed. The change over has involved use of organic bio-fertilisers such as cattle manure, neem cakes and vermi-composte manure replacing the chemical fertilisers used in the past. The Bangalore unit of IMO inspects the product every year and issues IMO certificate. The Manager of the Temi Tea estate expects that as soon as the IMO declares the estate as an "organic garden", the "products will fetch higher prices in the market" and that "Temi tea, produced in four grades, (would) find ready markets in European markets and Japan". The Tea Board has already started exporting to Canada and Japan in small quantities (100 kilograms (220 lb) of bulk tea at Rs 2500 per kg) at attractive prices.

== Demand ==
The tea produced at this tea estate is auctioned at the Kolkata Tea Auction Centre and has been able to garner one of the highest bids for its tea. Its export potential is gradually increasing and the Tea Board of the estate is making efforts to have direct link with international markets. In an effort to increase the production of tea in Sikkim, the Industry Department of Sikkim has given an open invitation to entrepreneurs to establish more tea gardens in Sikkim. The state Government, under the Tenth Five Year Development Plan, has identified tea under the long term strategy "raising and processing of plantation crops i.e. tea, oranges and cardamom" as one of the thrust areas for industrial development of Sikkim.

== Awards ==
The Tea Board of India awarded the ‘All India Quality Award’ to the Temi Tea Garden for two consecutive years of 1994 and 1995.

== Future goals ==
According to the Chairman, EXIM Bank, Temi Tea, which is following the organic growing practice is in popular demand in Europe, particularly in Germany. In line with the GI certification obtained for the "Choice Organic Darjeeling Tea", Temi Tea Estate has also applied for GI certification for its organiurce it is known that the Temi Tea is sold in the international market at Rs 2500 per kg (US$ 50/kg). EXIM Bank is also proposing to finance popularisation of organic tea by offering grant funds up to 50% to the tea estates, and in this context the GI certification would also help to protect the quality product of the estate.
