= Namchi =

- Town
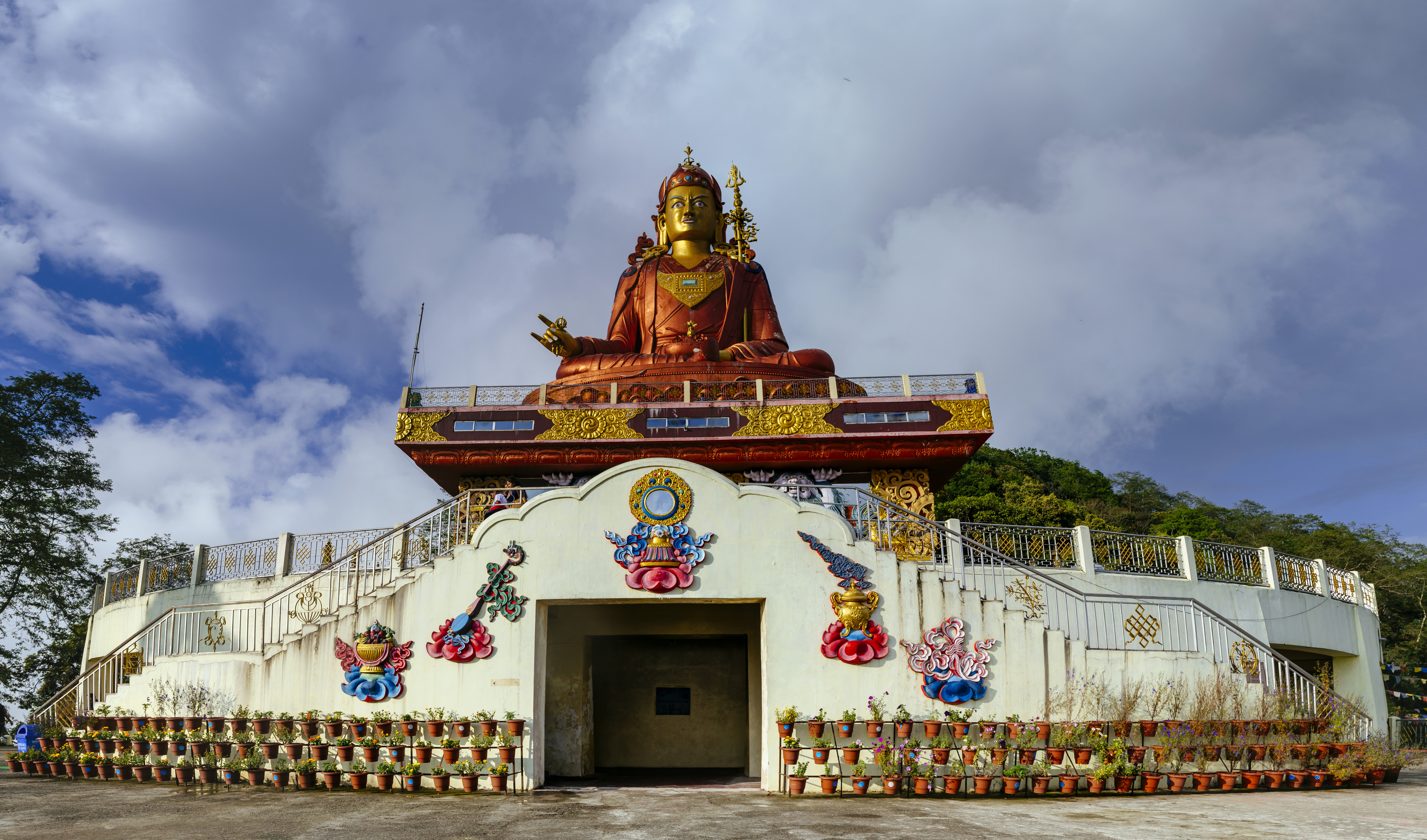
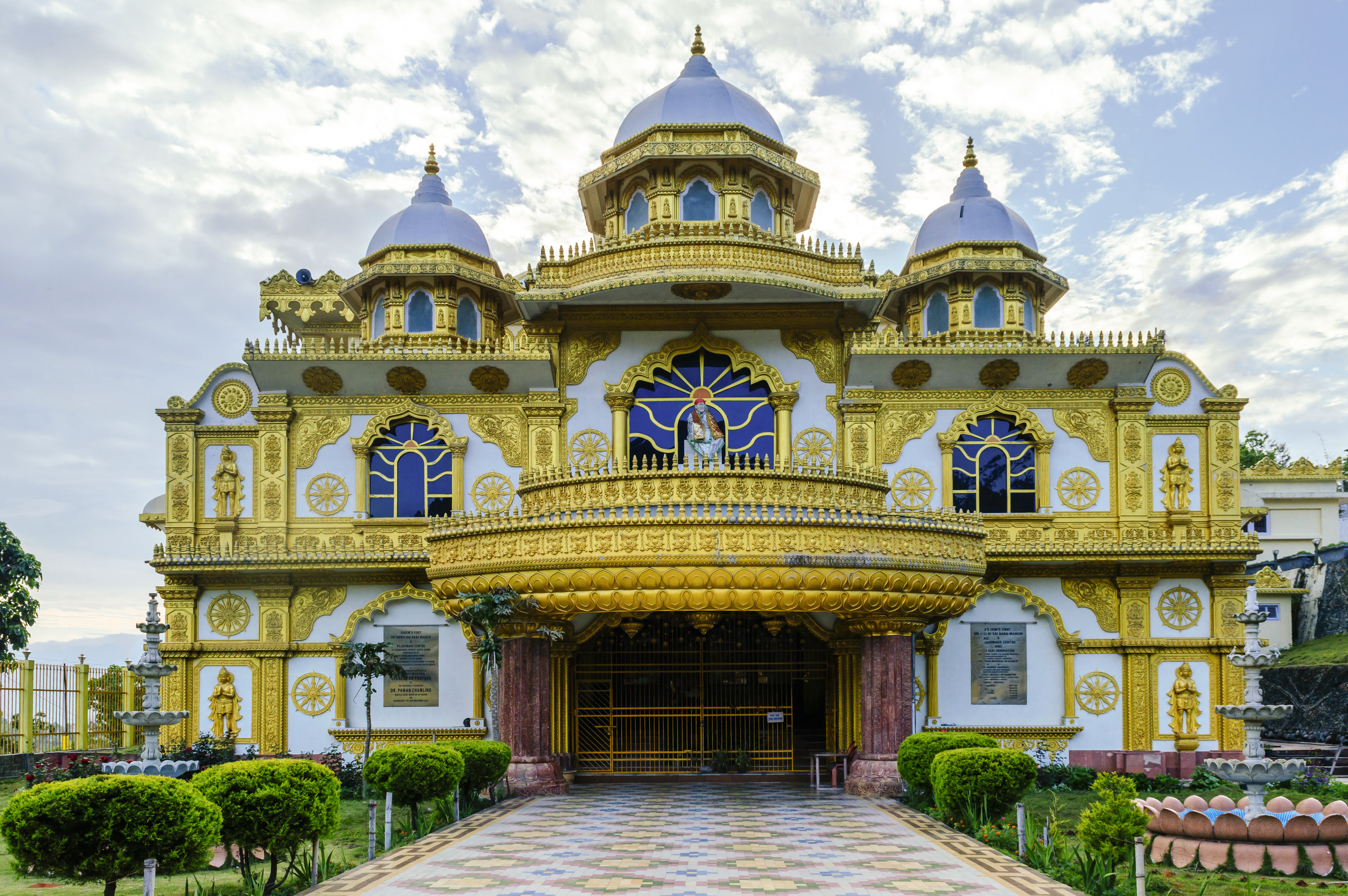
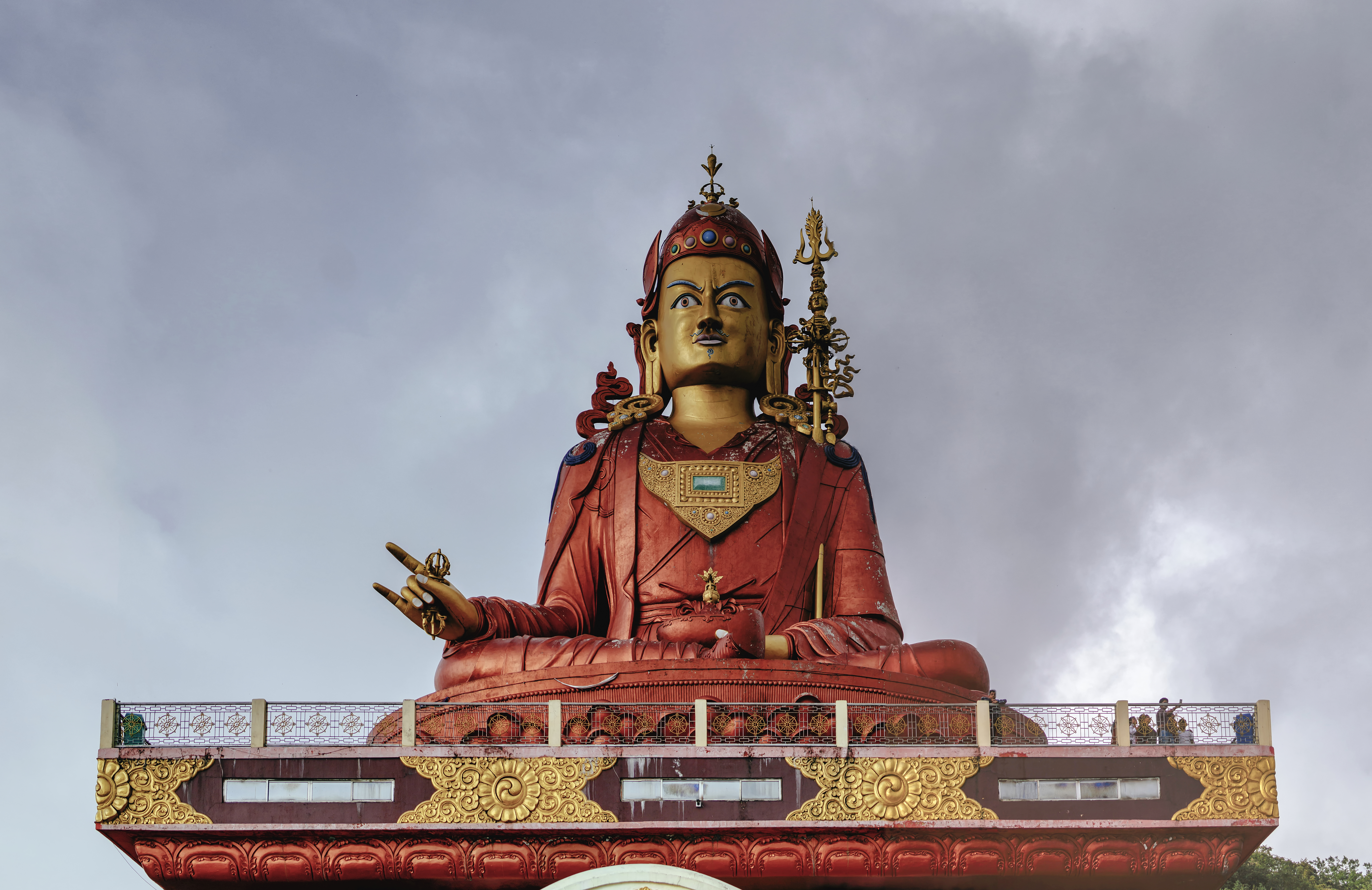
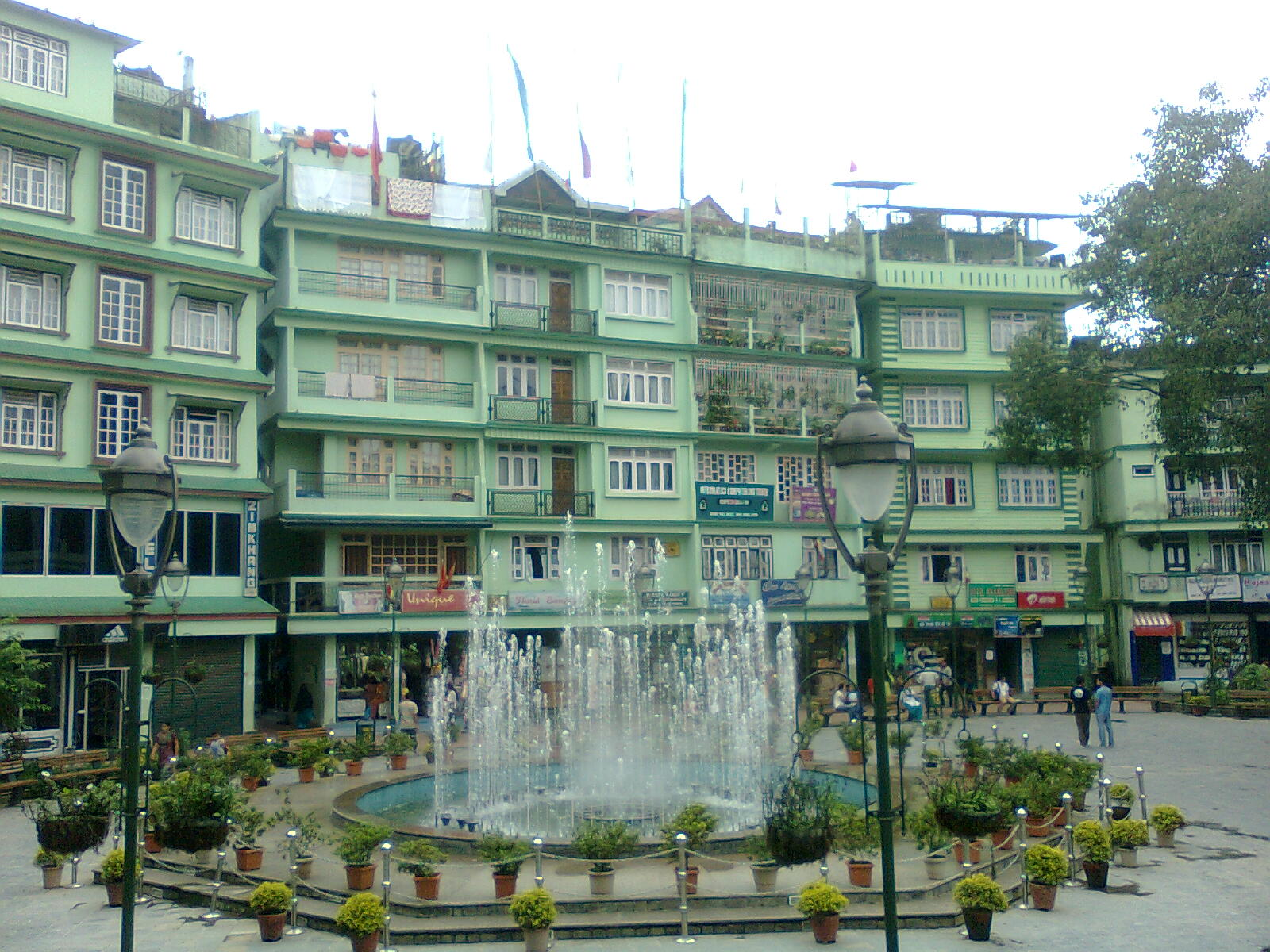
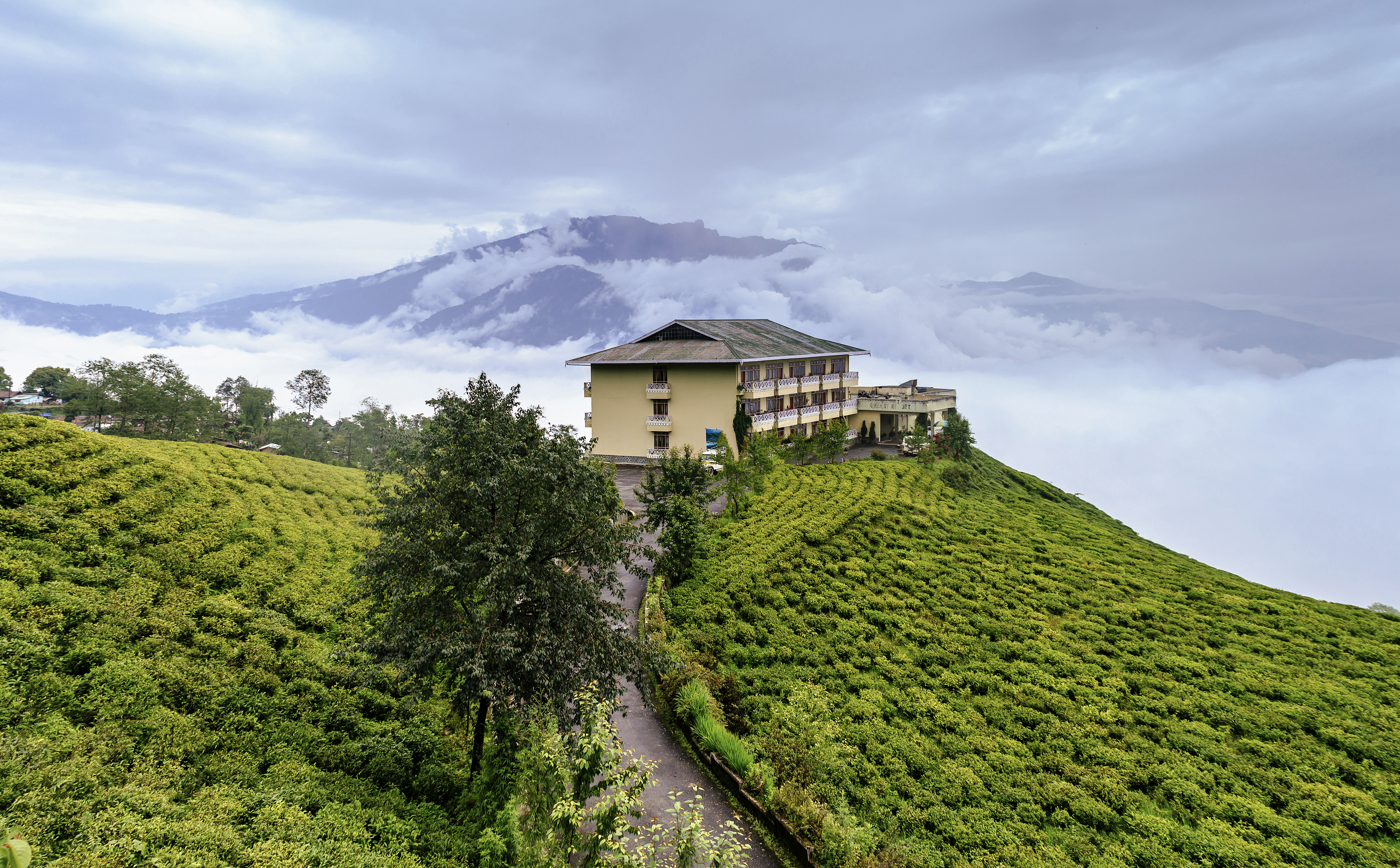
- Siddheshwar Dham Sai Temple Padmasambhava statue Central Park Temi Tea Garden

- Location of Namchi in Sikkim Namchi (India)
- Coordinates: 27.17°N 88.35°E
- Country: India
- State: Sikkim
- District: Namchi

Government
  - Type: Municipal Council
- Elevation: 1,314 m (4,311 ft)

Population (2011)
  - Total: 12,190

Languages
  - Official: English; Nepali; Sikkimese; Lepcha
  - Additional official: Gurung; Limbu; Magar; Mukhia; Newari; Rai; Sherpa; Tamang
- Time zone: UTC+5:30 (IST)
- PIN: 737 126
- Telephone code: 03595
- Vehicle registration: SK-05

Namchi is a town and the administrative headquarters of the South Sikkim district in the Indian state of Sikkim.

== History ==
Namchi means "sky high" in Sikkimese.

Chakdor Namgyal became the third Chogyal (king) of Sikkim in 1700. He was involved in a feud with his half-sister and regent Pende Ongmu, who tried to dethrone Chakdor. Following attacks from Bhutan, Chakdor went to exile in Tibet under the protection of the sixth Dalai Lama. However, relations soured between the Tibetans and Chakdor, and Pende hired a Tibetan doctor, who bled Chakdor to death. His army was sent to Namchi, the Tibetan doctor were executed, and Pende was caught and strangled at Namchi.

== Geography ==
Namchi is situated at an altitude of 1,314 m (4,311 ft). Located about 78 km (48 mi) from the state capital Gangtok, it is the administrative headquarters of the South Sikkim district.

The Mamley Stromatolite Park was declared as a National Geological Monument by the Geological Survey of India in 2014. The site exposes stromatolitic structures formed by algae exposed on dolomite and limestone rocks of the Proterozoic era.

== Demographics and administration ==
As of the 2011 Census of India, Namchi had a population of 12,190 of which 6,166 were males and 6,024 were females. About 8.61% of the population was below the age of six years. The literacy rate of Namchi was 88.1%, which was higher than state average of 81.42%. The male literacy was 91.3% and the female literacy rate was 84.84%. Hindus (56.07%) formed the majority of the population, followed by Buddhists (23.47%), Christians (15.37%), and Muslims (4%). Nepali (73.47%) was the most spoken language. Other languages spoken include Hindi (7.57%) and Sikkimese (6.45%).

Namchi is administered by the Namchi Municipal Corporation. The town is divided into seven wards for local administrative purposes.

== Transport ==
Sikkim Nationalised Transport operates public buses that connect Namchi to other towns of the state and Siliguri in West Bengal. The nearest major railhead is located at New Jalpaiguri, about 96 km (60 mi) from the town. The nearest airport is the Bagdogra airport in West Bengal, located about 102 km (63 mi) from.

== Tourism and recreation ==
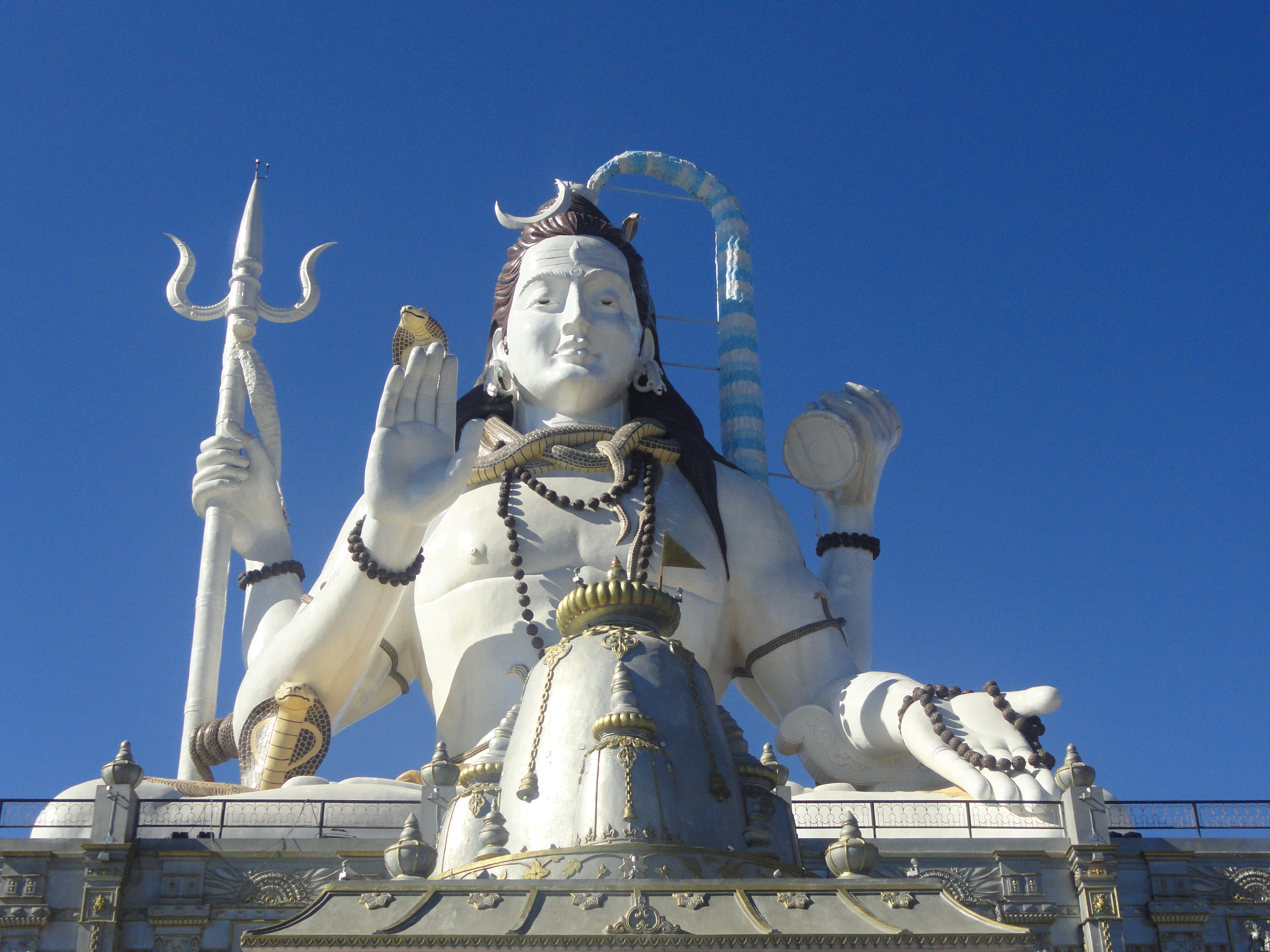
Statue of Shiva at Siddhesvara Dham

The Namchi Monastery is a Buddhist monastery at Namchi. The world's largest statue Padmasambhava, standing at 135 ft (41 m) tall, is located on the Samdruptse hill opposite Namchi. It was completed in February 2004. Siddhesvara Dham is located atop Solophok hilltop, about 5 km (3.1 mi) from Namchi. It has a 108 ft (33 m) tall statue of Shiva, a 18 ft (5.5 m) tall statue of Kirateshwar, models of the Chardham Hindu pilgrimage sites, and replicas of 12 Jyotirlingas.

The Temi Tea Garden, established in 1965, Temi Tea, produces a unique flavored tea. The estate was build over broadleaf forests, and incorporates an old bungalow, which served as a leprosy hospital in the early 20th century. The Baichung Stadium, named after footballer Baichung Bhutia, was opened in 2021. The Namchi Mohatsav is held every year in October at the Namchi Central Park. It hosts several art and cultural activities and exhibitions.

== Health ==
Namchi is an important centre for healthcare services in southern Sikkim. The town's District Hospital, established in 1975, has historically served as a major public healthcare facility for the region.

In 2025, a new 500-bedded District Hospital was inaugurated in Namchi, substantially expanding the town's healthcare infrastructure. Designed by Manchanda Associates, an architecture firm specialising in hospital design, the hospital includes facilities for diagnostic imaging, dialysis, blood banking, neonatal intensive care, surgery and other specialised services. It is the largest building in Namchi district and the first green-rated project in the state of Sikkim, holding a 3-Star GRIHA rating.

== See also ==
- Tribal Rain, a music band from Namchi
