= Lockhart Tea Museum =

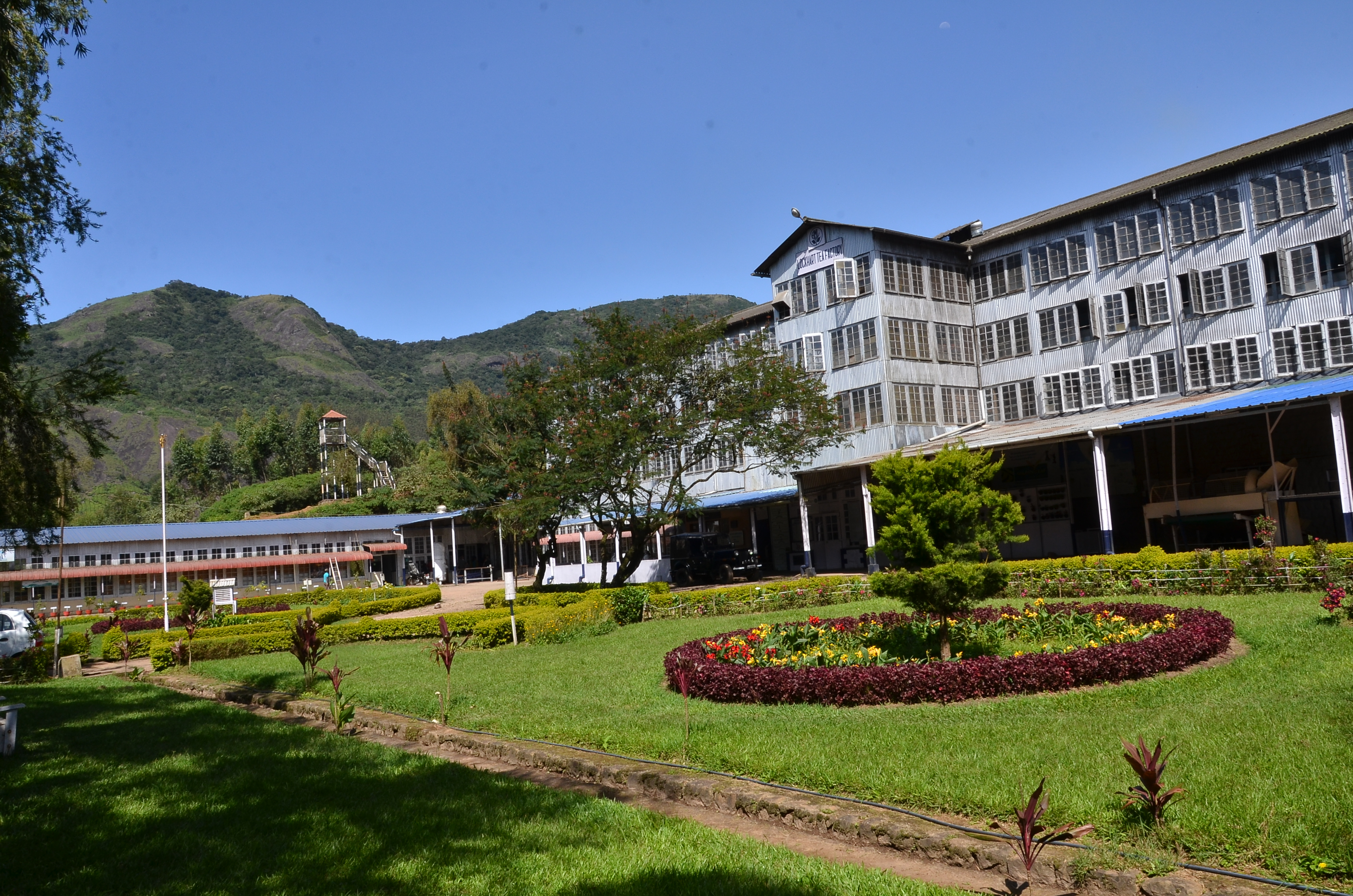
- Main building
- Established: 22 January 2014
- Location: Kannan Devan Hills, Idukki district Kerala, India
- Coordinates: 10.0543°N 77.1091°E
- Type: Tea museum, industry and history museum
- Owner: Harrisons Malayalam Limited
- Website: http://lockhartteamuseum.business.site

The Lockhart Tea Museum is located in Kannan Devan Hills, which was originally constructed in 1936. It is situated 9 km (5.6 mi) from Munnar on the Thekkady Road. The museum was opened to the public on 22 January 2014.

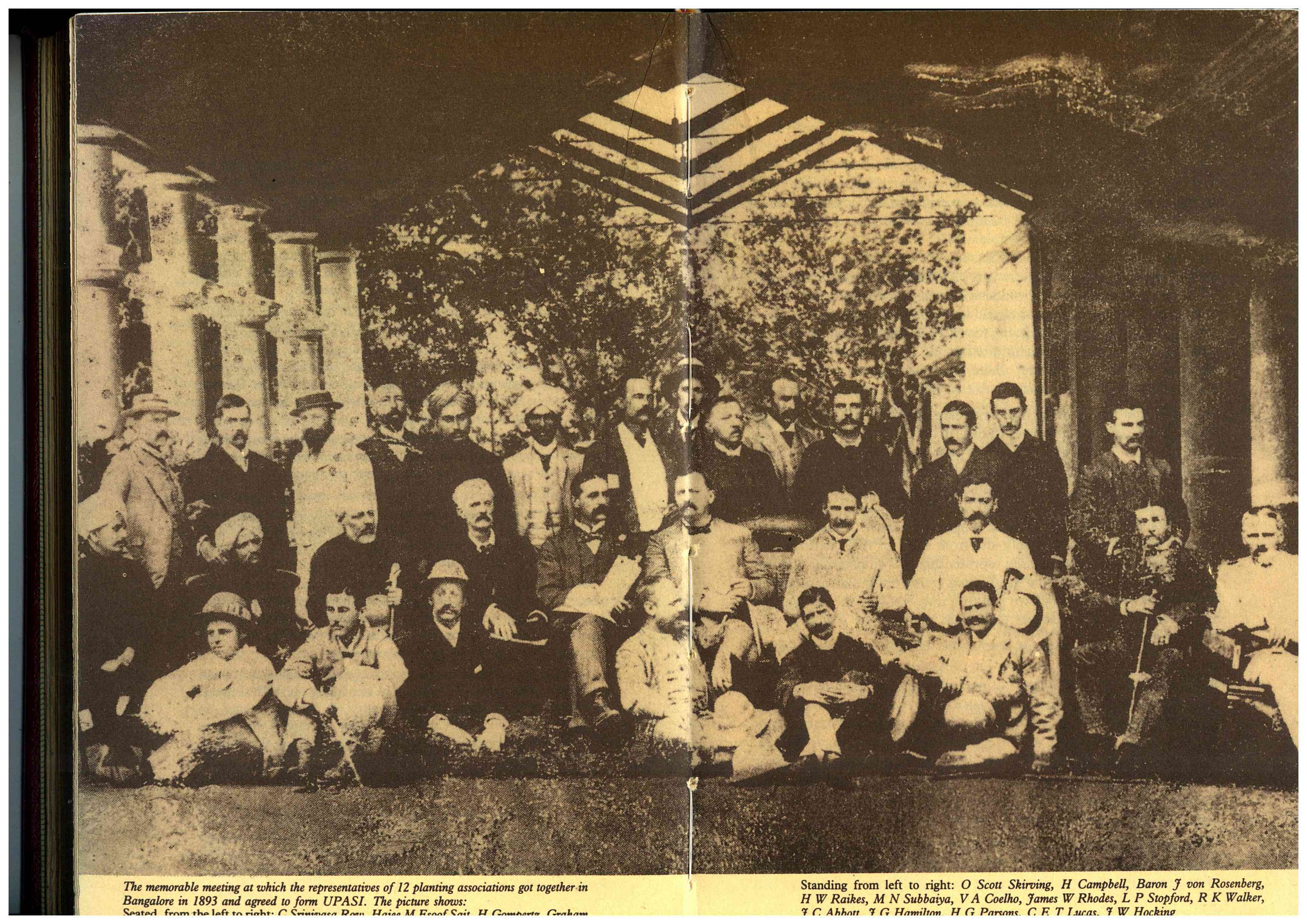
Standing from Left to Right : Third is Baron von Rosenburg

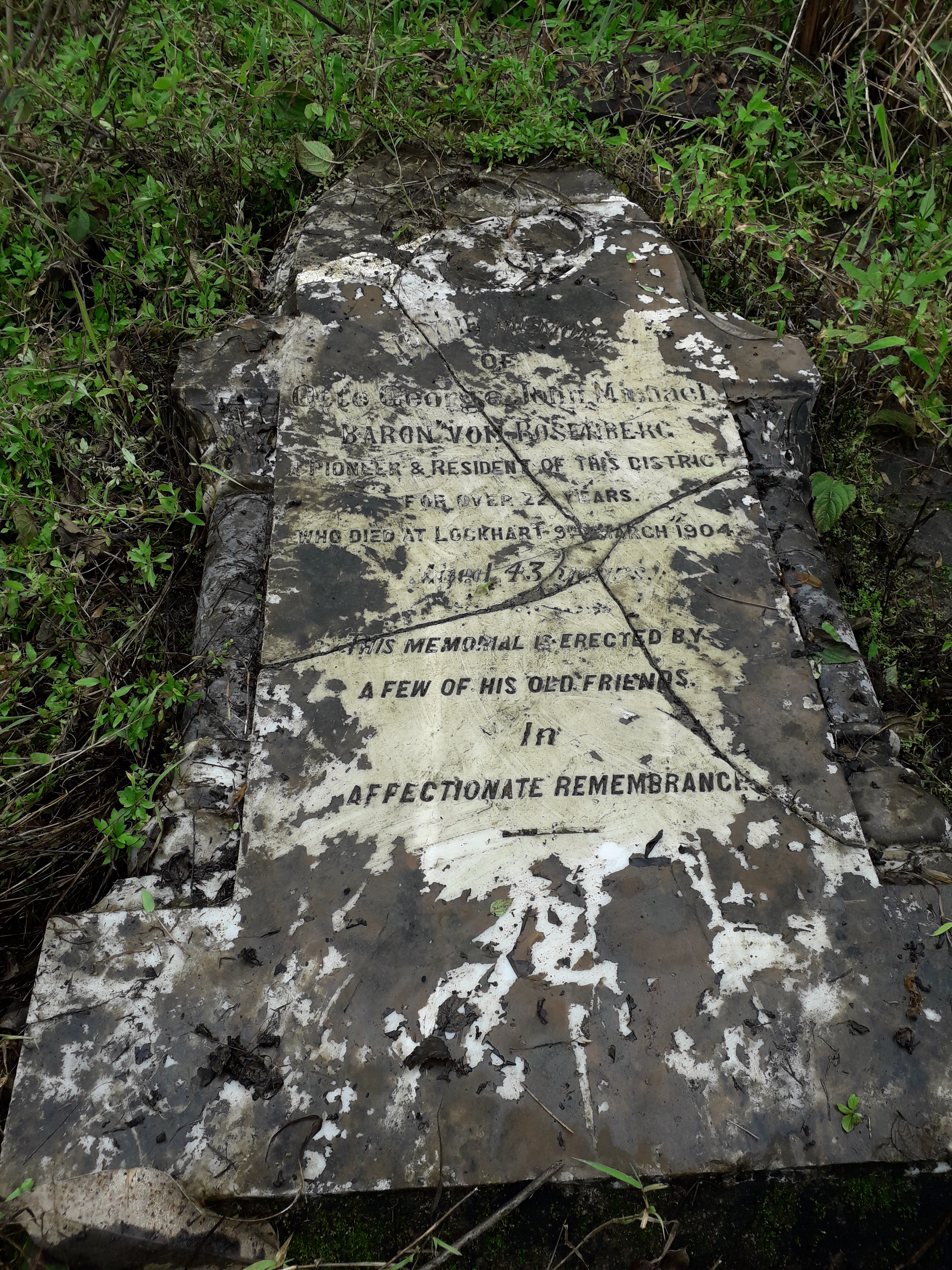
Cemetery of Otto George John Michael Baron von Rosenburg, who was the first planter of Munnar during 1879

The museum is part of the Lockhart Estate, which is one of the earliest tea plantations in High Range (Munnar), established by Baron John Von Rosenberg and his son, Baron George Otto Von Rosenberg in 1879. Initially they planted cinchona then coffee and afterwards tea.

The building, which houses the museum, was constructed in 1936. The Lockhart Tea factory produces about 20 million kilograms of tea annually and is owned by Harrisons Malayalam Limited, one of South India's largest tea cultivators. The factory allows public visits during regular working hours, allowing visitors the opportunity to observe the various stages of tea processing. The museum houses photographs and machinery that was used in earlier days of tea production.

The factory and museum are located on the slopes of Chokarmudy, one of South India's highest peaks, from which the entire valley of Lockhart can be seen.

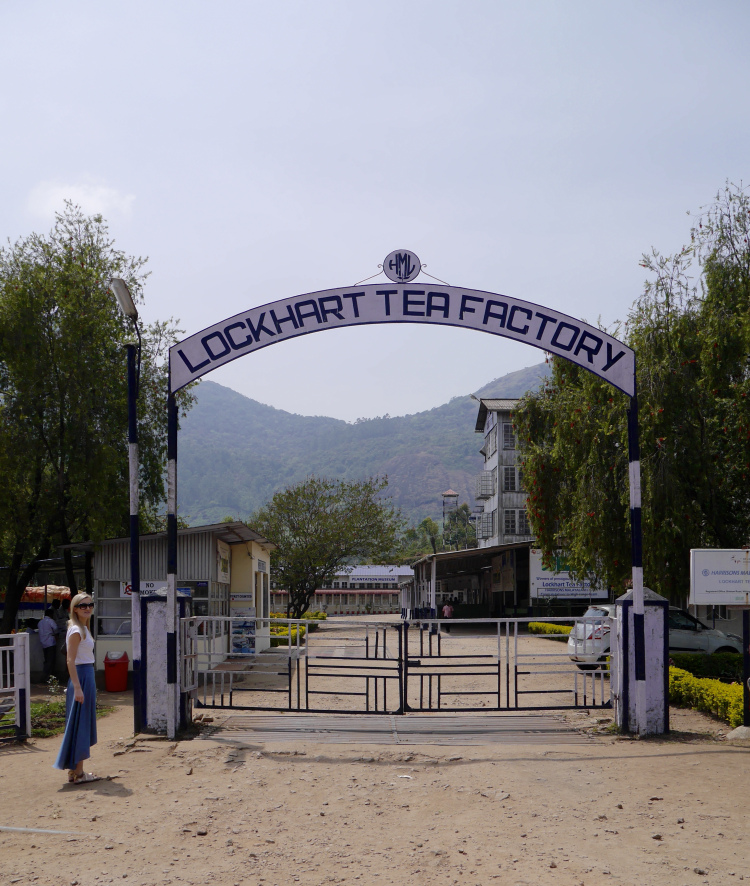

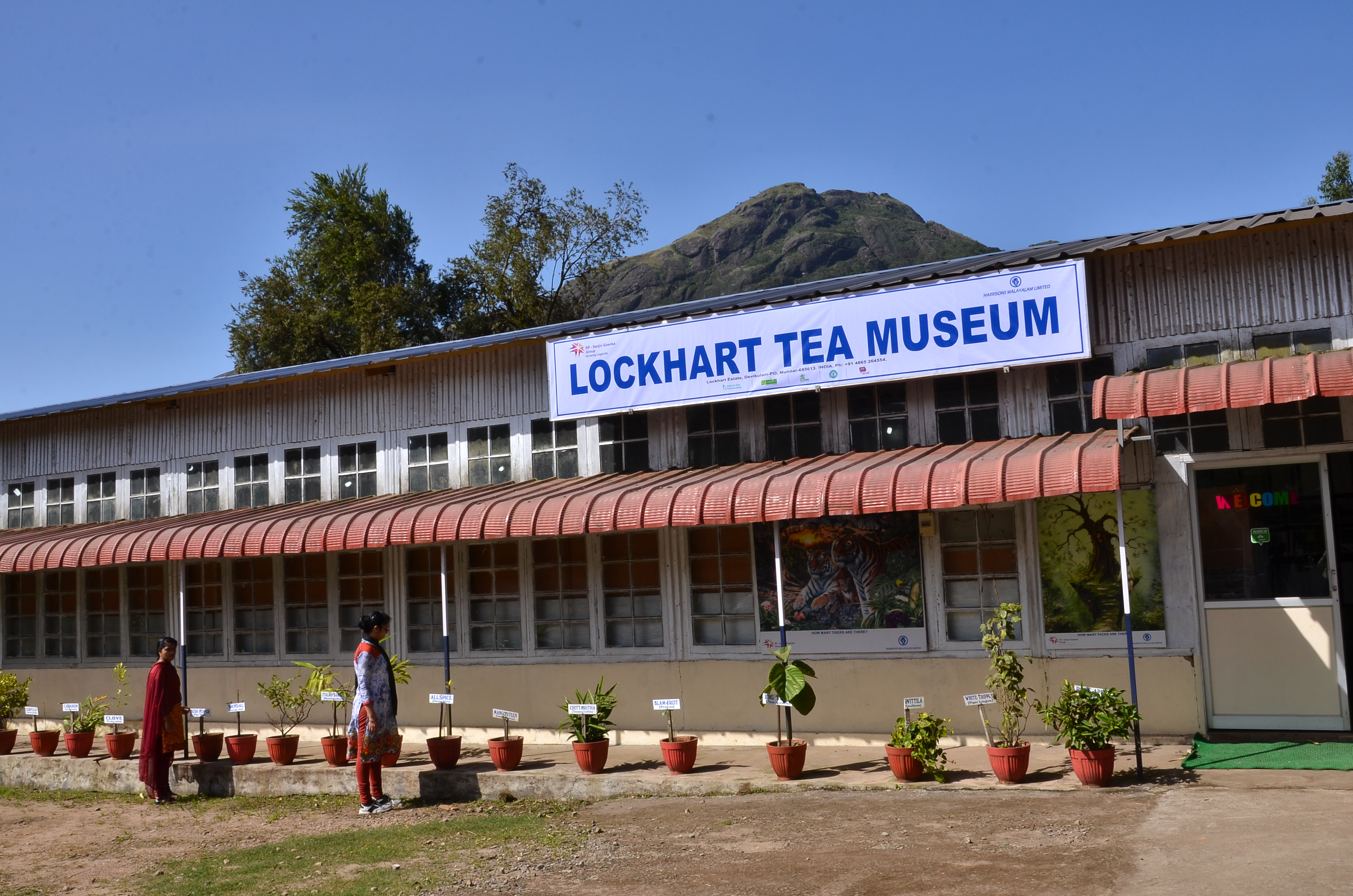

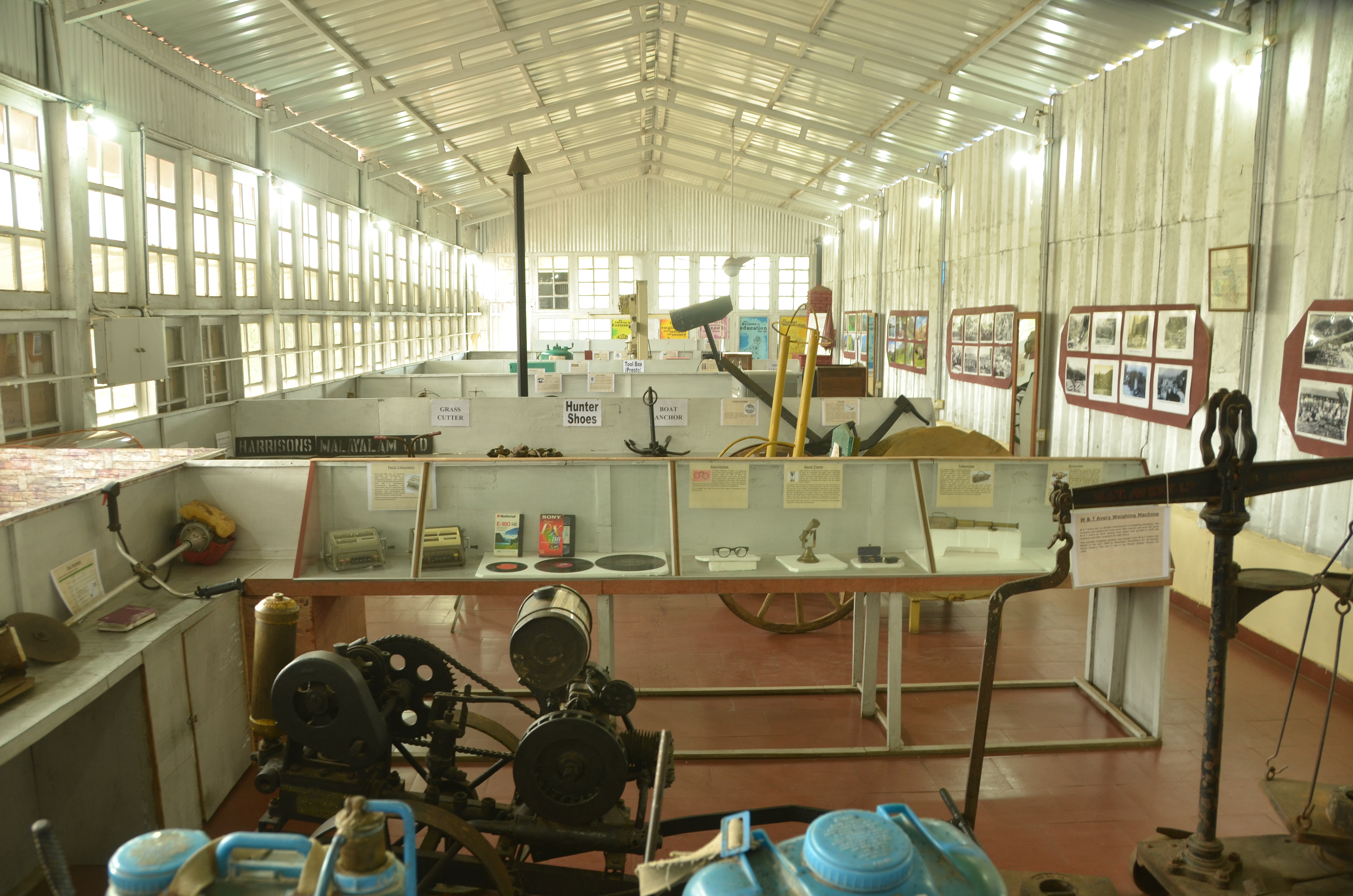

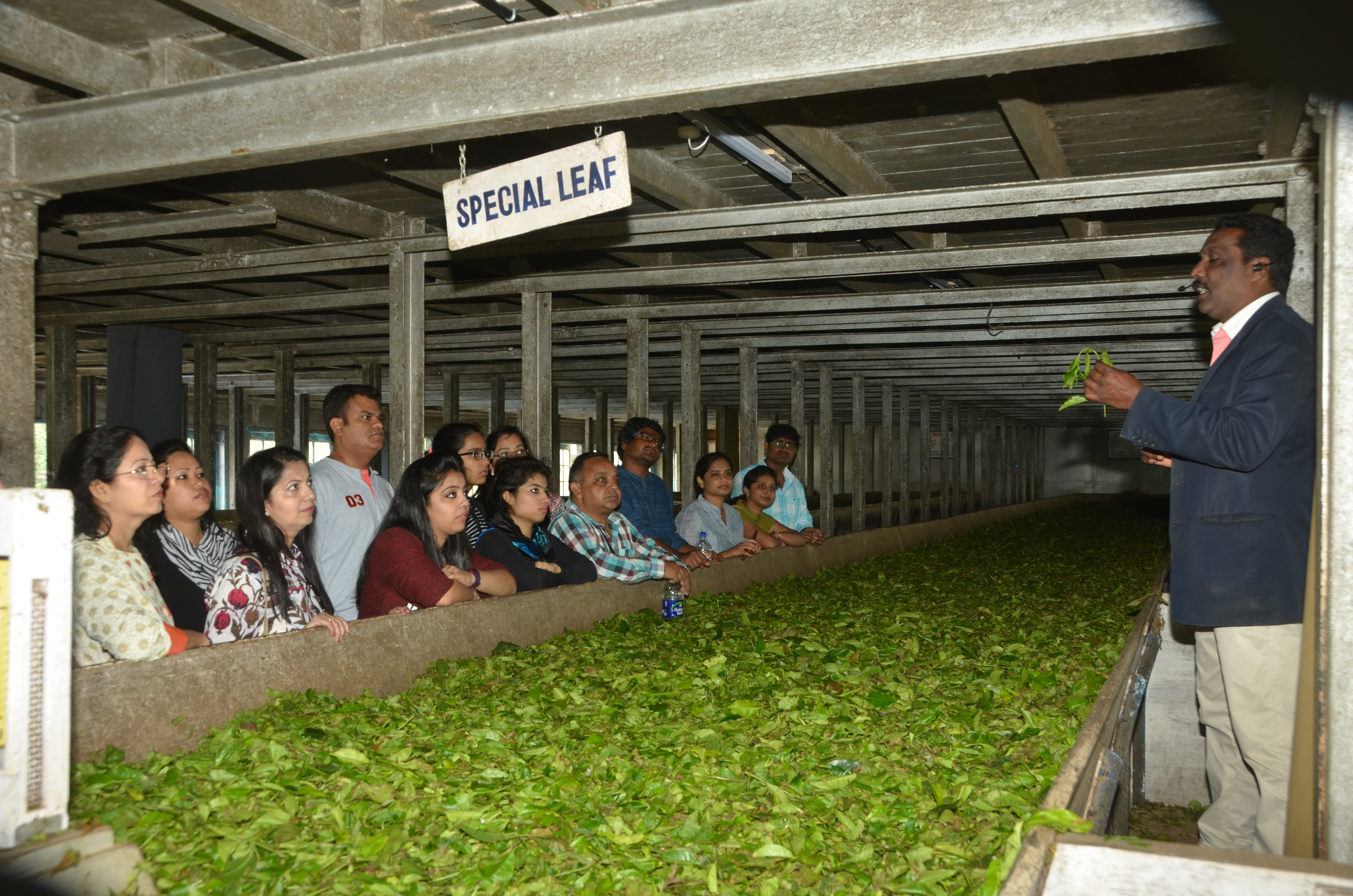

== See also ==
United Planters' Association of Southern India

UPASI Tea Research Foundation
