= R. A. Headworks =

Diversion dam in Kerala, India

Coordinates: 10°4′5.1″N 77°4′1.6″E

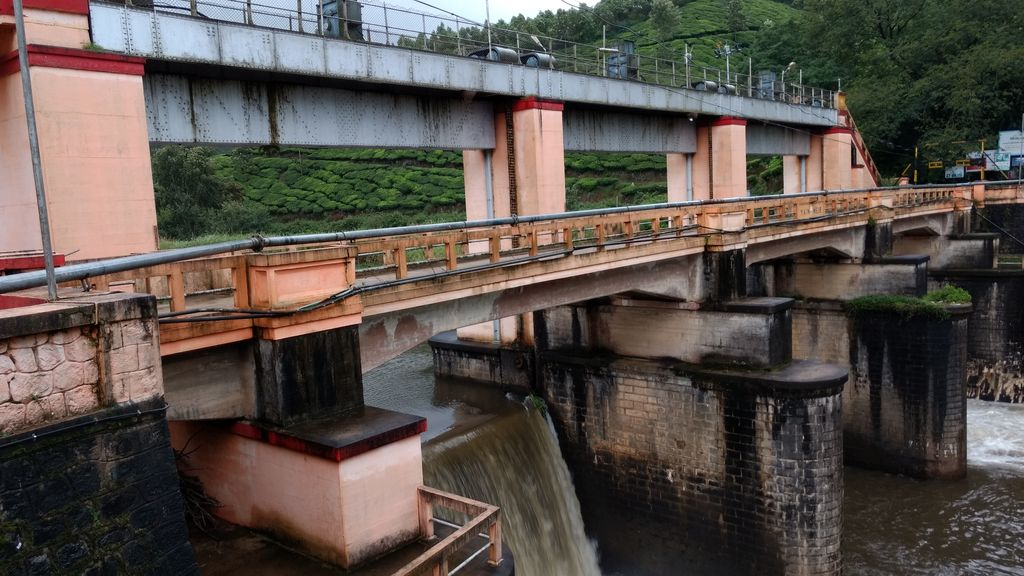
Ramaswamy Aiyer Headworks

R. A. Headworks or Ramaswamy Aiyar Headworks is a masonry type weir situated in Munnar panchayath of Munnar village in Idukki district of Kerala, India impounding mudirapuzha river. It is also called as Munnar Headworks. It is a part of Pallivasal Hydro Electric Project, the first hydro power project of Kerala State. There are two dams and one diversion weir as part of this project. These are Kundala Dam, Maduppetty Dam and R. A. Head works.

Ramaswamy Aiyer Headworks is located 15 km (9.3 mi) downstream of Maduppetty Dam near Munnar. The water stored in the Kundala reservoir is released through the stream to Maduppetty Dam located downstream. From the Maduppetty reservoir the water is released to downstream through a dam toe power house. The controlled release from Maduppetty Dam reaches the diversion weir named R.A. Head works and from there, the water is diverted through a water conducting system to the power house of Pallivasal HEP located on the right bank of Mudirapuzha river. After generating power, the tail water is pumped to the balancing reservoir of Sengulam Hydro Electric Project and the surplus water from the sump of pumping station is spilled to the Mudirapuzha river itself.

== Specifications ==
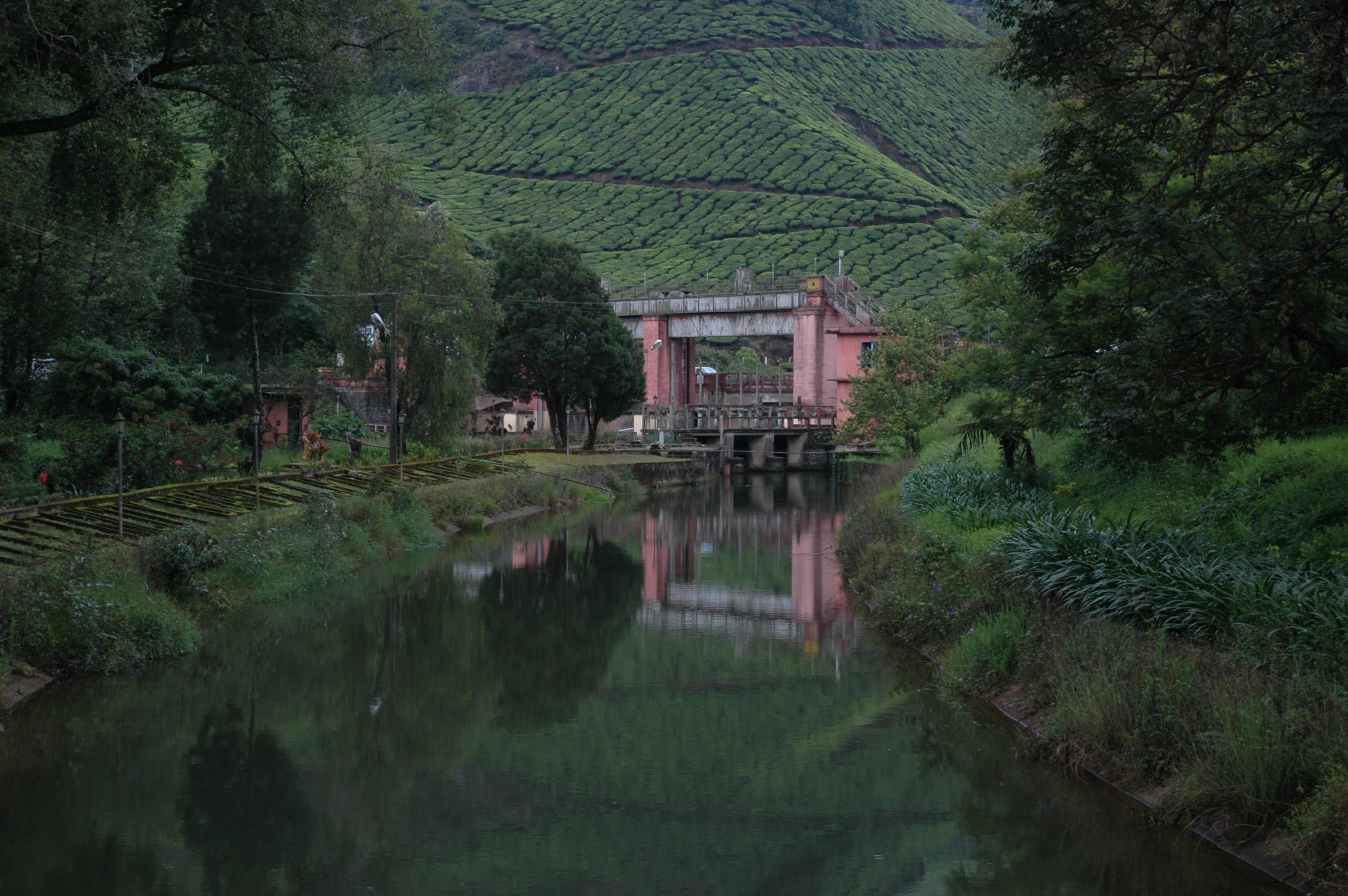
The dam and its sluice canal

- Latitude : 10⁰ 04’00” N N
- Longitude: 77⁰ 04′ 00″ E
- Panchayath : Munnar
- Village : Munnar
- District : Idukki
- River Basin : Muthirapuzha
- River:Muthirapuzha
- Release from Dam to river : Muthirapuzha
- Dam type : Masonry
- Classification : Weir
- Maximum Water Level (MWL) : EL 1450.92 m
- Full Reservoir Level (FRL) : EL 1450.92 m
- Storage at FRL : 0.223 Mm3
- Height from deepest foundation : 10.90 m
- Length : 39.62 m
- Taluk through which release flows : Devikulam
- Spillway : Vertical gate, 3 Nos. of size 11.60 x 6.70 m each
- Year of completion : 1944
- Crest LevelEL : 1439.02 m
- Name of Project: Pallivasal HEP
- River Outlet : Not provided
- Purpose of Project: Hydro Power
