= Pallivasal =

Village in Kerala, India

- Village
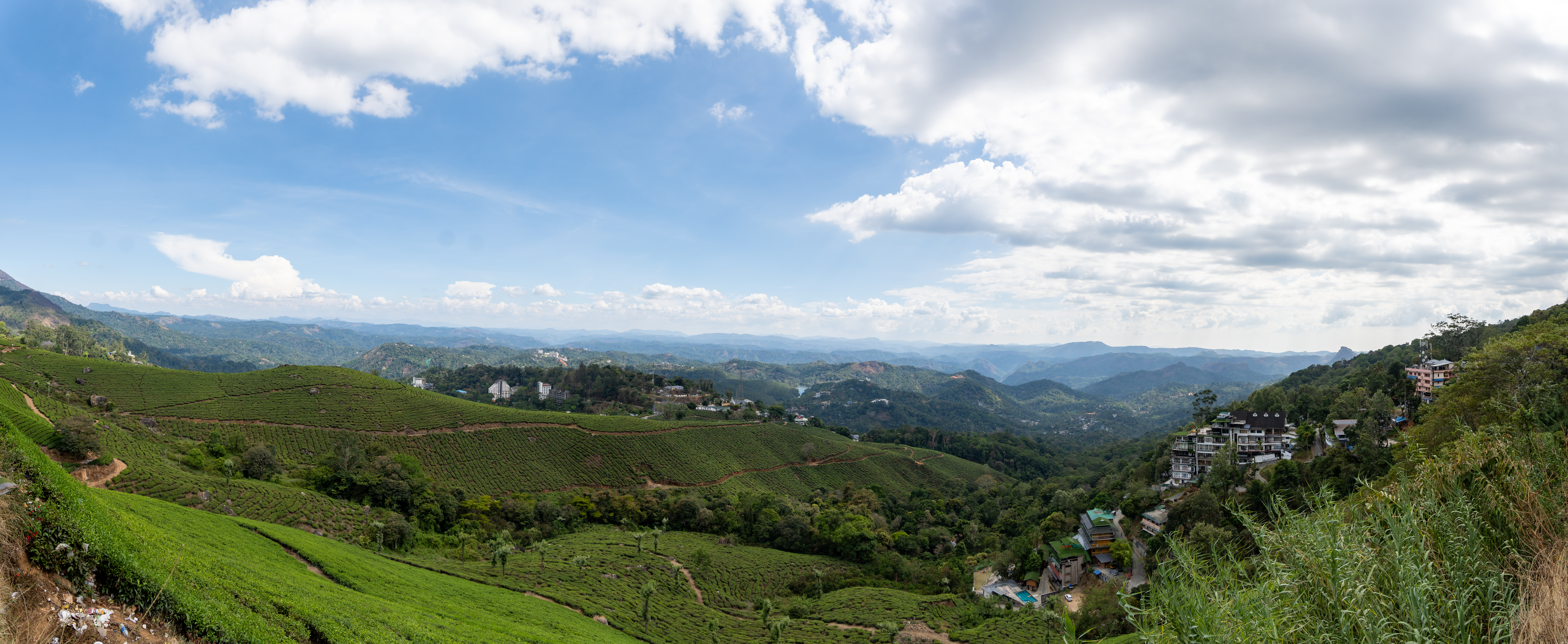

- Location in Kerala, India Pallivasal (India)
- Coordinates: 10°3′0″N 77°3′0″E
- Country: India
- State: Kerala
- District: Idukki

Area
  - Total: 33.89 km^{2} (13.09 sq mi)

Population (2011)
  - Total: 10,875
  - Density: 320.9/km^{2} (831.1/sq mi)

Languages
  - Official: Malayalam, English
  - Regional: Malayalam, Tamil
- Time zone: UTC+5:30 (IST)
- Vehicle registration: KL-68

Pallivasal is a village in Idukki district in the southwestern Indian state of Kerala.

The first hydro-electric project in Kerala was established at Pallivasal during the reign of Maharajah Sree Chithira Thirunal Balarama Varma.

== Pallivasal project ==
The Pallivasal electric project was commissioned in 1940. The Kerala electricity transmission system also emerged in 1940 with a 66 kV line from Pallivasal to Thiruvananthapuram. Eight substations were commissioned in 1940.

== Demographics ==
As of 2011 Census, Pallivasal had population of 10,875 which constitutes 5,417 males and 5,458 females. Pallivasal village has an area of 33.89 km^{2} (13.09 sq mi) with 2,726 families residing in it. The average sex ratio was 1007 lower than state average of 1084. In Pallivasal, 9.4% of the population was under 6 years of age. Pallivasal had an average literacy of 90.6% higher than the national average of 74% and lower than state average of 94%; male literacy was 94.5% and female literacy was 86.8%.

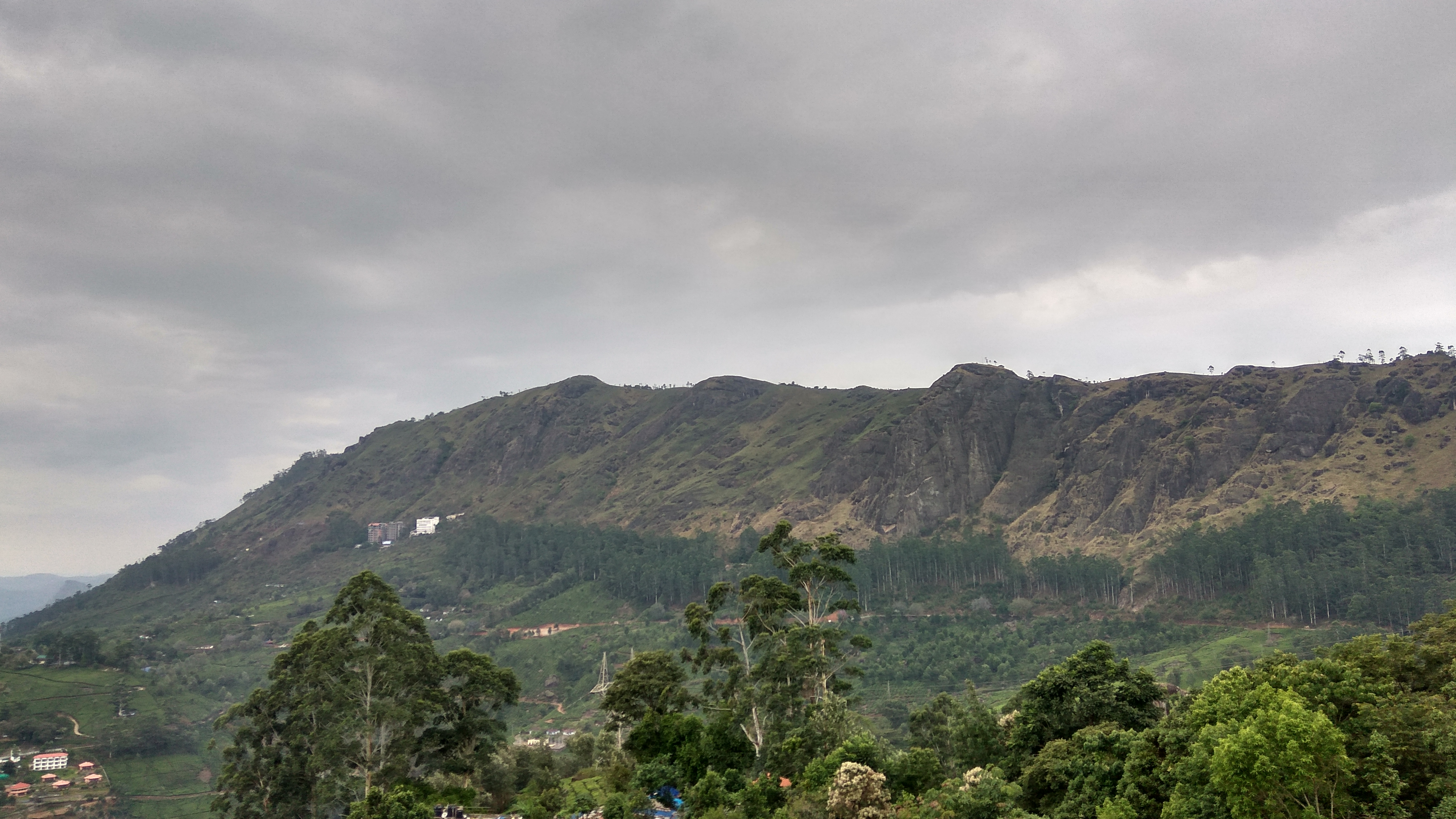
The mountain towering to the north of the village

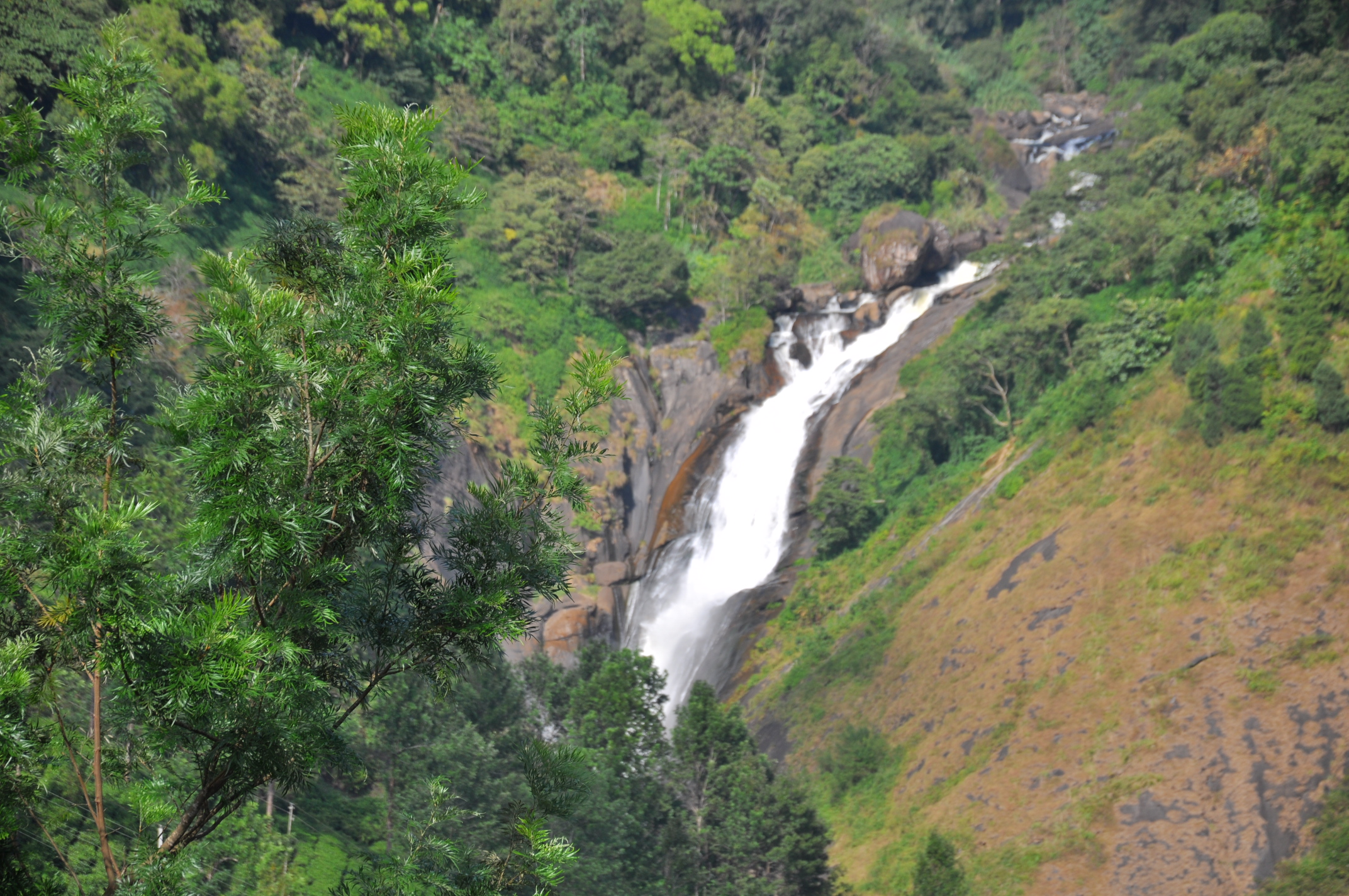
Attukad Waterfalls
