= 2015 Munnar Plantation strike =

The Munnar Plantation strike was a nine-day strike led by the women of the Munnar Kannan Devan Hills Plantations Limited (KDHPL). It was famous for it being an all-women uprising leading to the formation of an all-women union Pengal Orumai (women's unity) and is referred to as a turning point in Kerala's political history.

== Introduction ==
The salary of plantation workers in the state is decided by the Plantation Labour Committee. PLC comprises representatives of trade unions, plantation managements, and the government. PLC meeting and discussion is possible only if the labour minister takes the initiative. The strike began on 6 September with about 5000 workers, the majority being women, agitating in front of the KDHPL office after the management struck down the bonus to ten percent, which was 20 percent the previous year, citing dips in profit and falling tea prices – this despite the daily wage being a mere Rs 234 for 12 hours of labour and the fact that the daily output per worker had increased to 31 kilograms from 21. The main demands of the workers was a hike in wages from Rs.232 to Rs.500. One of the most important facts about this strike, is that the agitation was led and organised by the women workers who steadfastly refused to allow men into it, citing reasons such as that they were easily swayed by alcohol and that it was the women who did the actual work of plucking leaves and carrying and loading the burden, which comes with greater occupational hazards such as knee damage and pesticide inhalation. The country's biggest trade unions such as AITUC (CPI), INTUC (Congress) and CITU (CPM) were forbidden from co-opting the movement, even though at one time they tried to barge into their protest because according to the workers, they had done precious little to improve their conditions and instead preferred to cosy up to the management. A controversy was started a spark happened between Pembilai Orumai and Mm mani in April 2017

== Negotiations ==
The government eventually intervened, and conducted negotiations with the striking workers led by the all-women union, Pembilai Orumai. They were given front seats at the negotiations led by the Chief Minister of Kerala, Oommen Chandy, and the Labour Minister Shibu Baby John, and on 13 September, their demands were finally met.

== Aftermath ==
Similar strikes were soon called by women workers at other places including Harrisons Malayalam Ltd's tea estates in Idukki and Wayanad districts, where 500 women workers went on strike and over 11,000 workers of TATA Tea resorted to ‘go slow’ plucking in peak plucking season, one of the slogans being ‘we pluck tea leaves, you pluck our lives.'
