= Pallivasal Hydro Electric Project =

First Hydro Electric project in Kerala

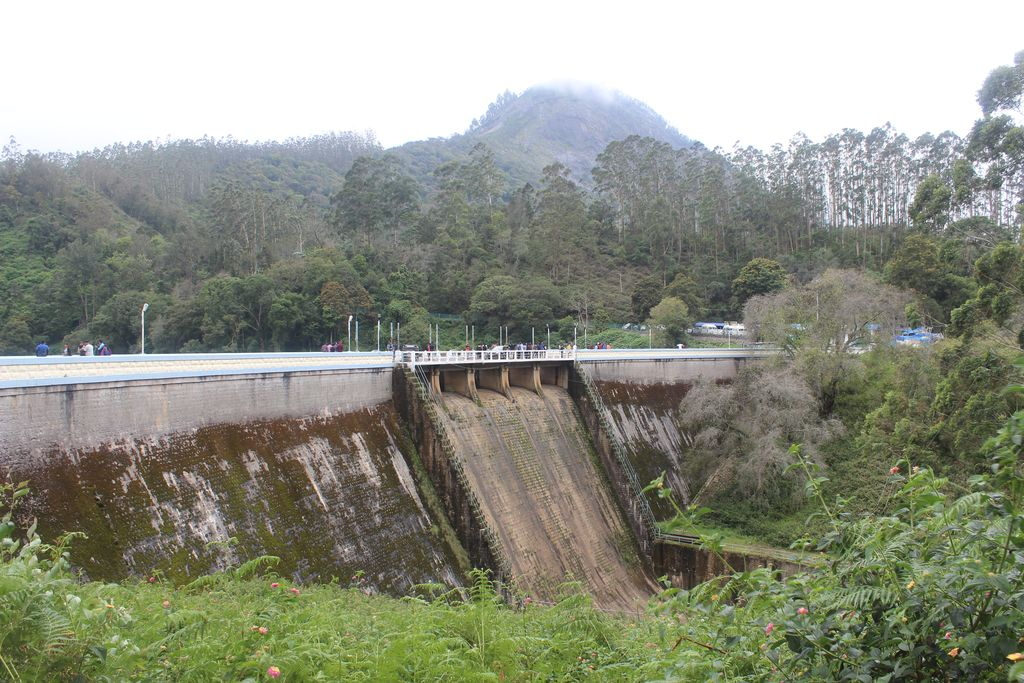
- Kundala Dam, one of the reservoirs of the project
- Country: India
- Purpose: Hydroelectric
- Status: Completed
- Owner: Kerala State Electricity Board

Power Station
- Type: Hydro Power Plant
- Installed capacity: 37.5 MW (3 x 5 MW + 3 x 7.5) (Pelton-type)
- Website; Kerala State Electricity Board

Pallivasal Hydroelectric Project is the first hydroelectric project in Kerala, India. The project consists of 2 reservoirs, 2 dams, a diversion dam and a power house and is owned by the Kerala State Electricity Board. The power house of the project has been constructed at Chithirapuram in Pallivasal Gram Panchayat, Munnar, Idukki District. The first unit was inaugurated in March 1940 by the Travancore Diwan C. P. Ramaswamy Iyer. The second unit and third unit was commissioned in February 1941 and February 1942 respectively. In 1944, Ramaswamy Iyer constructed the R. A headworks dam on Muthirapuzha, a tributary of Periyar in Munnar to divert the water.

In 1950, the capacity was increased from 4.5 MW to 5 MW by replacing the water wheels. In the first phase of the project, three units of 5 MW capacity were completed and the capacity of 15 MW was achieved. In the second phase, three turbines of 7.5 MW capacity, and the Kundala Dam and Mattupetti Dam for water storage were constructed, which took the installed capacity of the project to 37 MW.

== Power generation ==
The Pallivasal Hydroelectric Project is generating 37.5 MW of electricity using 3 turbines of 5 MW (PELTON TYPE- Escherwyss Switzerland) and 3 turbines of 7.5 MW (PELTON TYPE- Boving UK). The annual production capacity of the project is 284 million unit.

== See also ==
- Moolamattom hydro power station
