= Kannan Devan Hills =

Village in Kerala, India

- Village
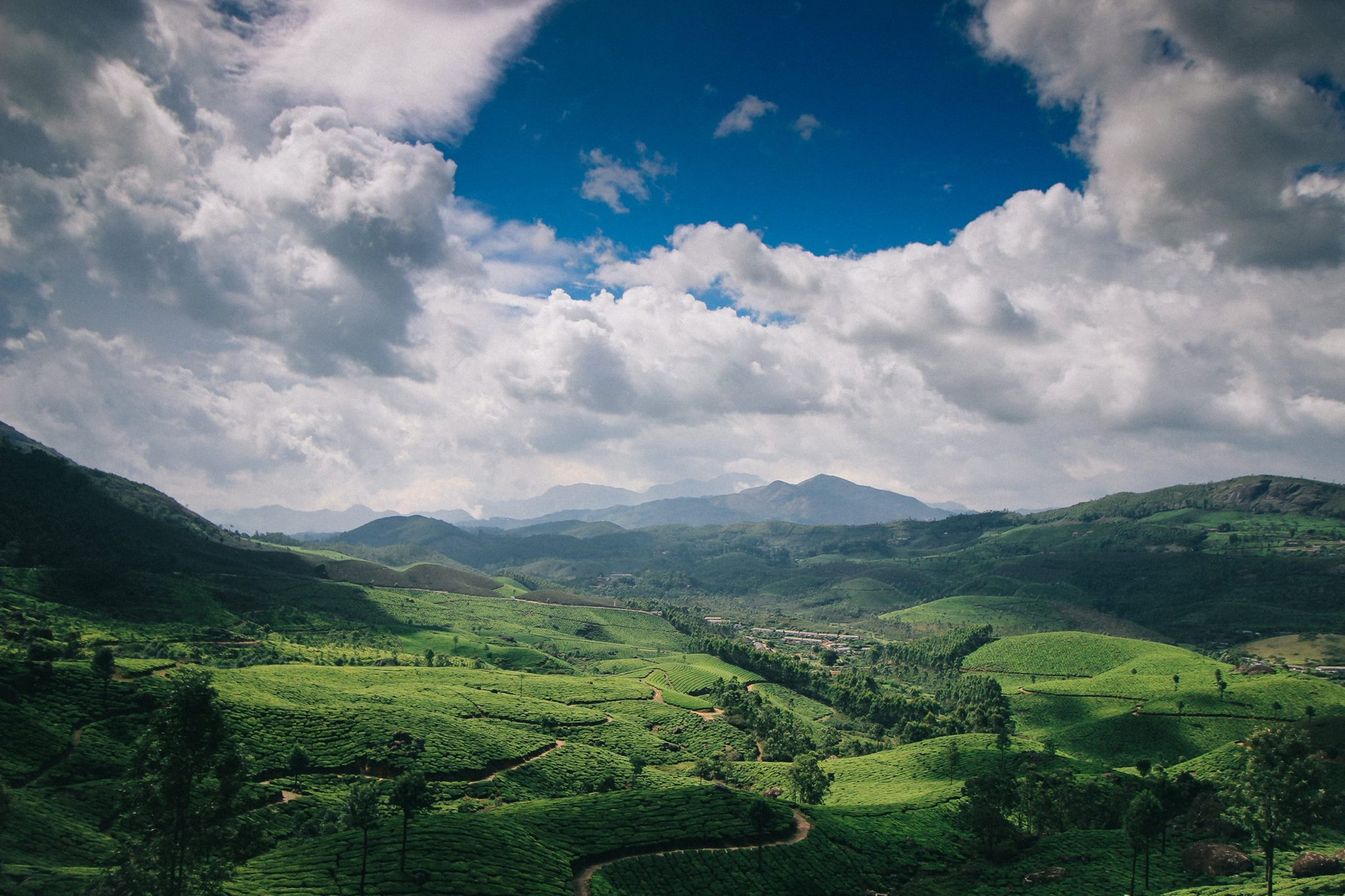
- Famous tea plantations area of Kannan Devan Hills. Taken from National Highway 85.

- Location within Kerala Location within India
- Coordinates: 10°03′00″N 77°03′00″E
- Country: India
- State: Kerala
- District: Idukki
- Taluk: Devikulam

Government
  - Type: Village Panchayat
  - Body: Devikulam & Munnar Grama Panchayats

Area
  - Total: 456.89 km^{2} (176.41 sq mi)
- Elevation: 1,700 m (5,600 ft)

Population (2011)
  - Total: 55,738
  - Density: 121.99/km^{2} (315.96/sq mi)

Languages
  - Official: Malayalam, English
  - Regional: Tamil ,Malayalam
- Time zone: UTC+5:30 (IST)
- PIN: 685613
- STD code: 04865
- Vehicle registration: KL-68
- Coastline: 0 kilometres (0 mi)
- Nearest city: Munnar

Kannan Devan Hills is a large village located in Devikulam Taluk of Idukki District in the Indian state of Kerala. It is situated near the state border of Tamil Nadu about 25 kilometres northeast of the district seat Painavu and 8 kilometres north of the subdistrict seat Devikulam. In 2011, it was home to 55,738 residents.

The village was given on lease on 11 July 1877 by the Poonjar thampuran to John Daniel Munroe of London and Peermade for tea plantation. The lands and plantations were later resumed by the Government of Kerala through the Kannan Devan Hills (Resumption Of Lands) Act, 1971.

== History ==
Traditional states that Col. Arthur Wellesley, the later Duke of Wellington, was the first English man to have set foot in the High Range during the Battle of Nedumkotta. The earliest available record about this region is in a terrain survey of 1816-17 by Lt. Benjamin Swayne Ward, son of Col. Francis Swayne Ward.

There were a few more expeditions into the area, including one led by Col. Douglas Hamilton in 1862 and one led by John Daniel Munro in 1877. Munro was given a lease of land in the same year as his expedition, and he opened his own tea plantation three years later. More plantations were constructed in the 1880s and 1890s. In 1897, Kannan Devan Hills Produce Company was registered to operate the local tea plantations.

Following the Independence of India, this area remained in the hands of British enterprises. In 1971, the Government of Kerala passed the Kannan Devan Hills (Resumption of Lands) Act, and transferred the control of the region back to Indian government. Kannan Devan Hills remains as a revenue village ever since.

== Demographics ==
As of 2011 Census, Kannan Devan Hills had total population of 55,738 with 27,973 males and 27,765 females. Kannan Devan Hills village spreads over an area of 456.89 km^{2} (176.41 sq mi) with 14,134 families residing in it. In KDH, 8.7% of the population was under 6 years of age. The village had average literacy of 85.48%, which is lower than Kerala state average of 94.00%. The census location code of Kannan Devan Hills is 628054.

== Galleries ==
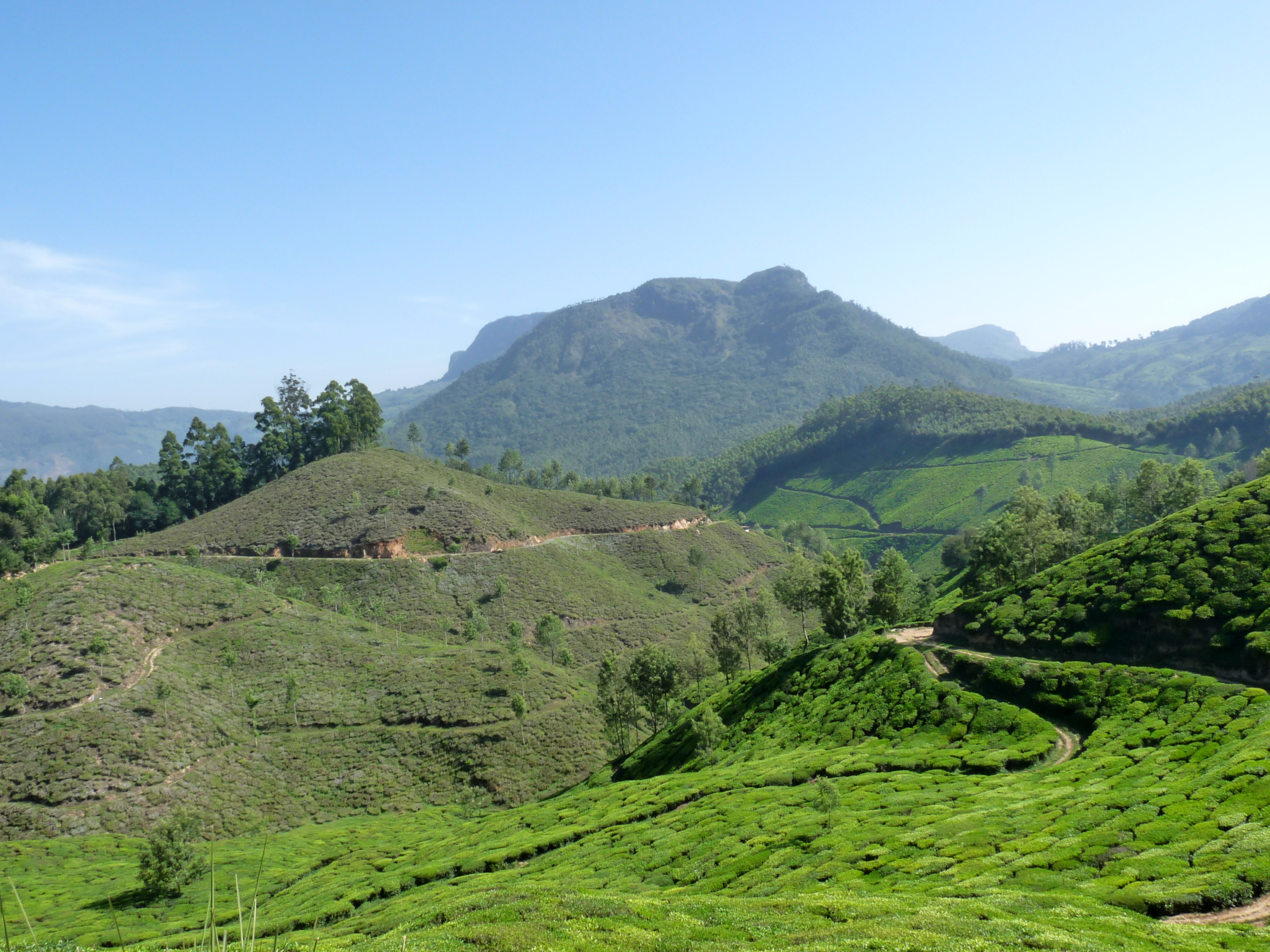
View of Kannan Devan Hill

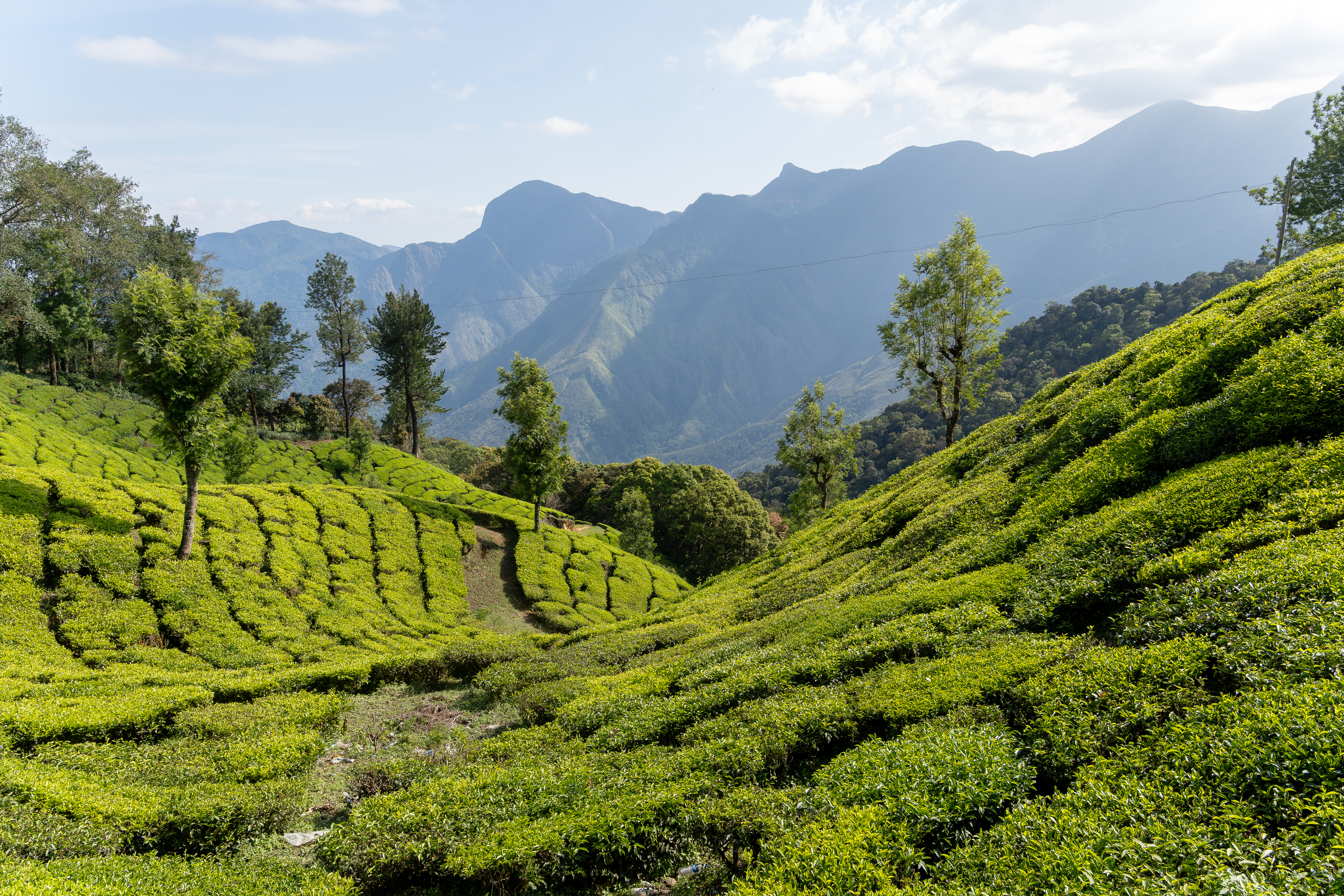
Western Ghats Mountains from the Top station in Kannan Devan Hills

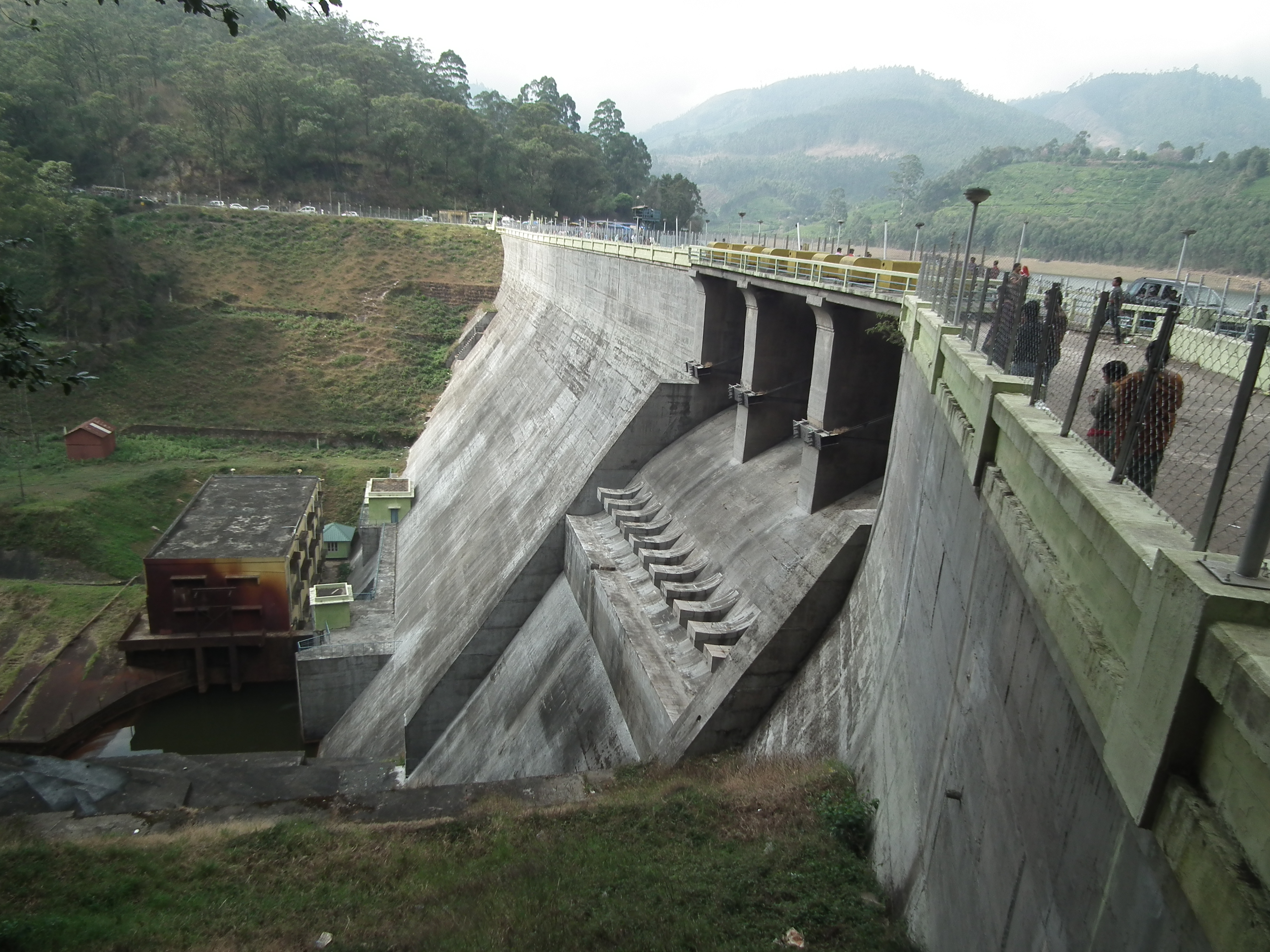
Mattupetty Dam

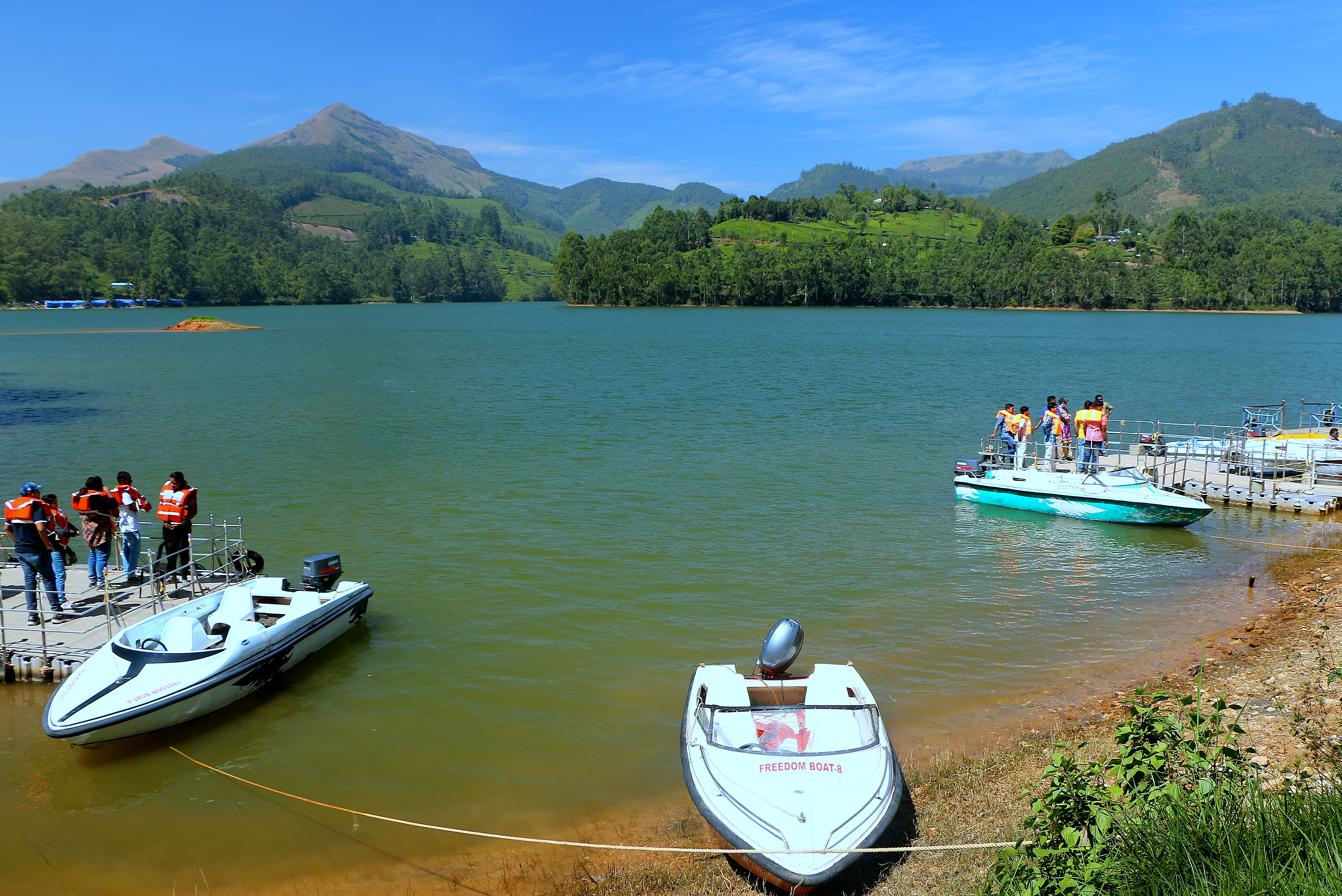
Mattupetty Dam Reservoir

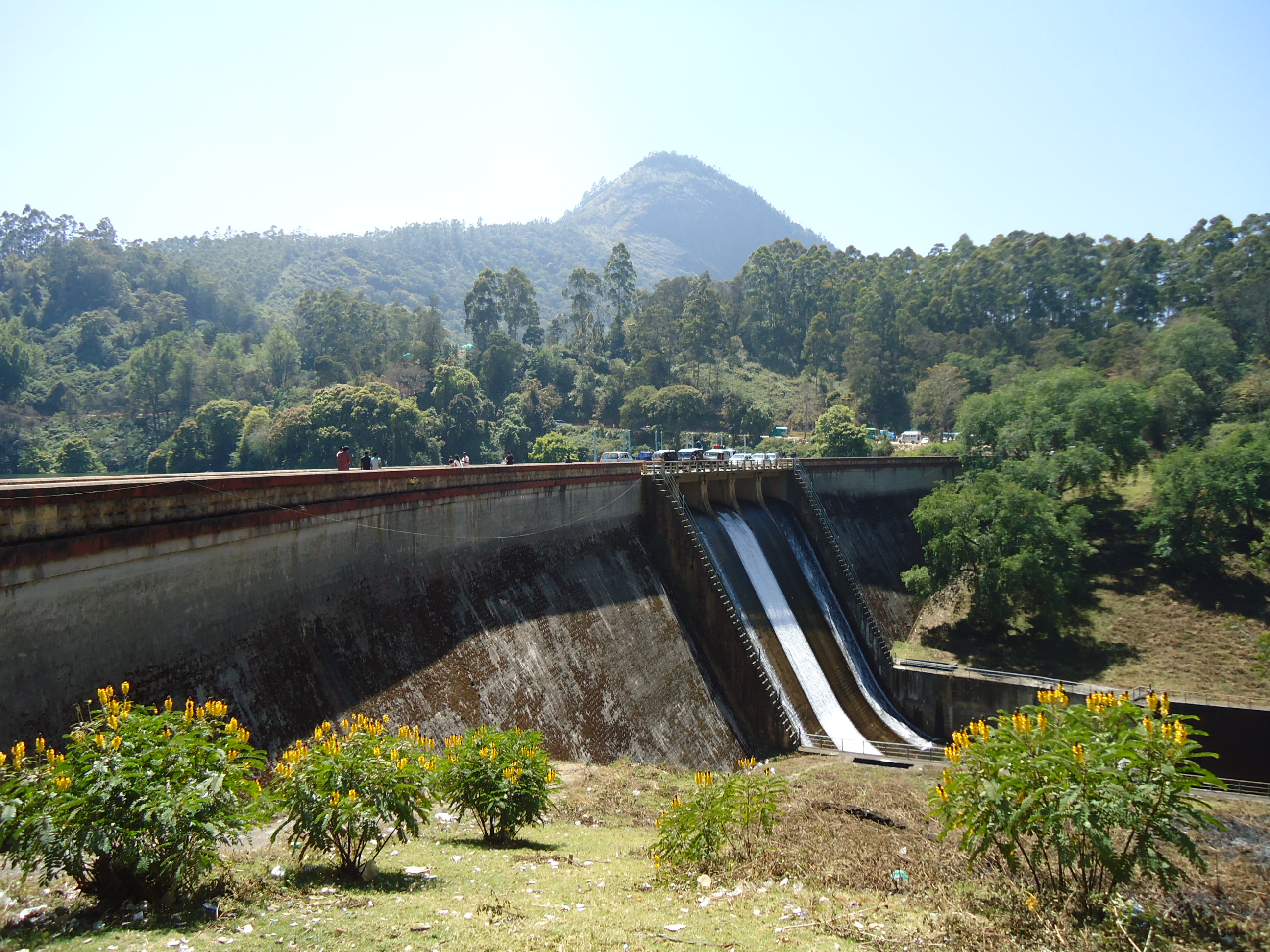
Kundala Dam

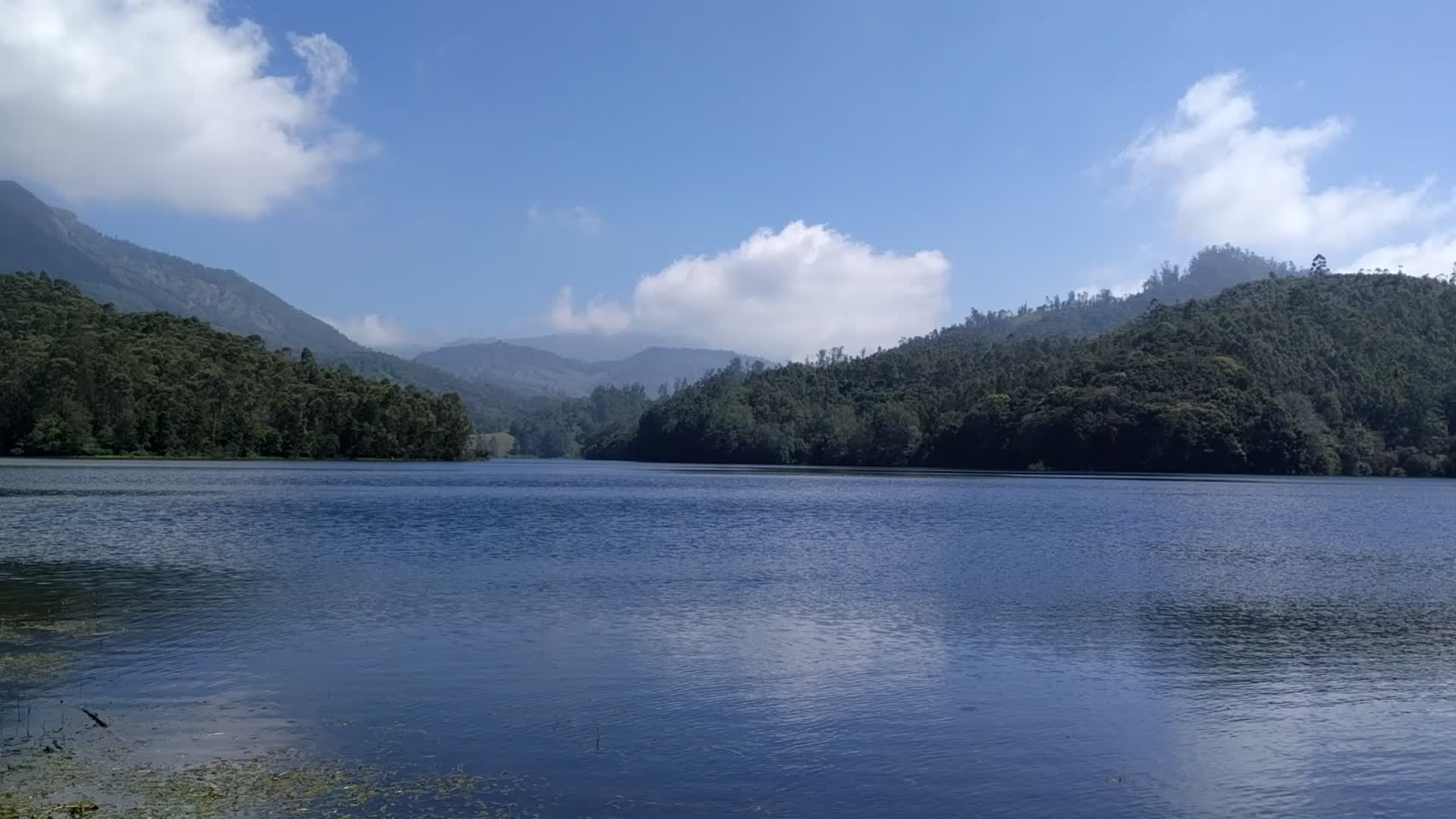
Kundala Dam reservoir

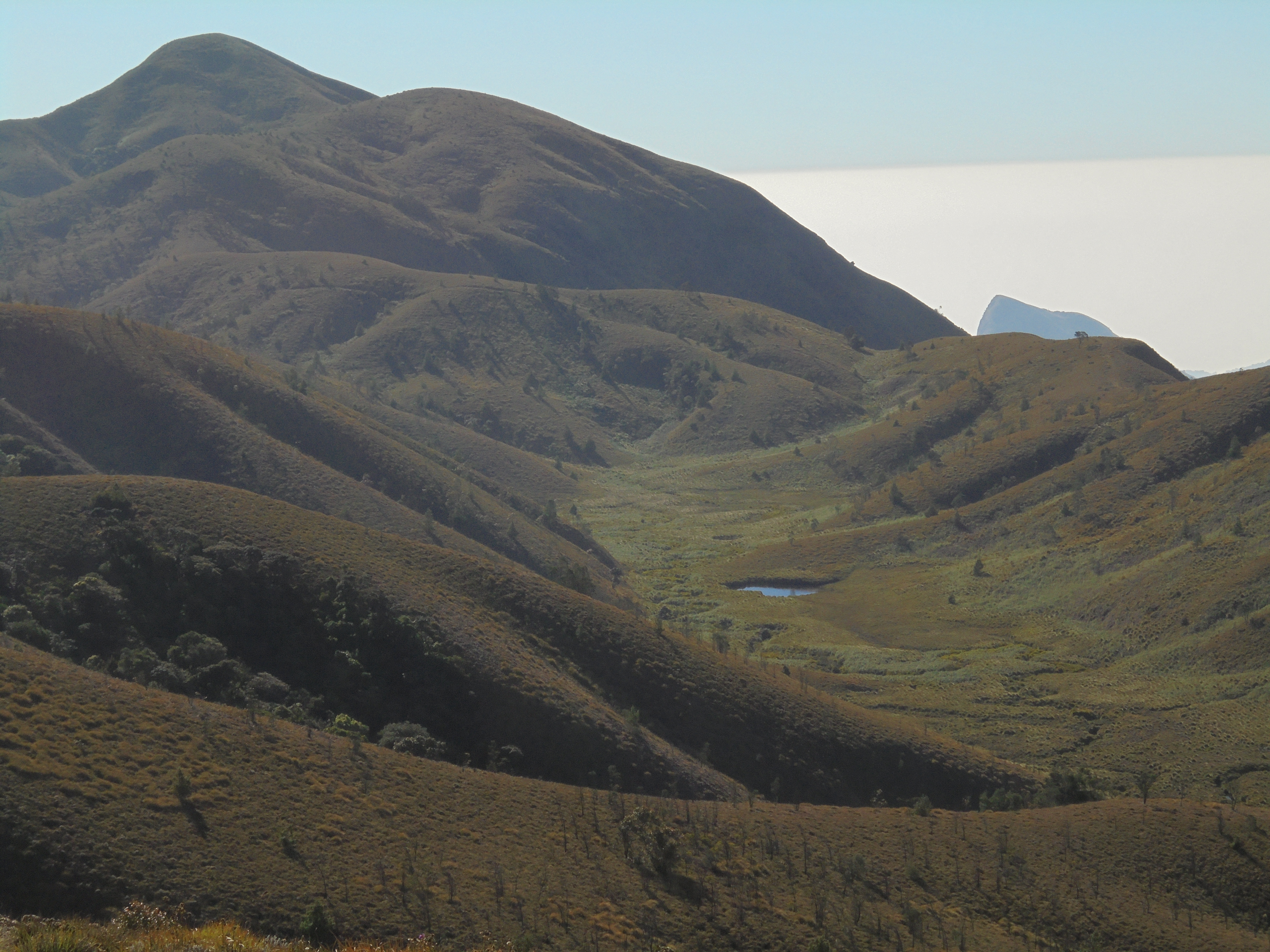
Meesapulimala mountain

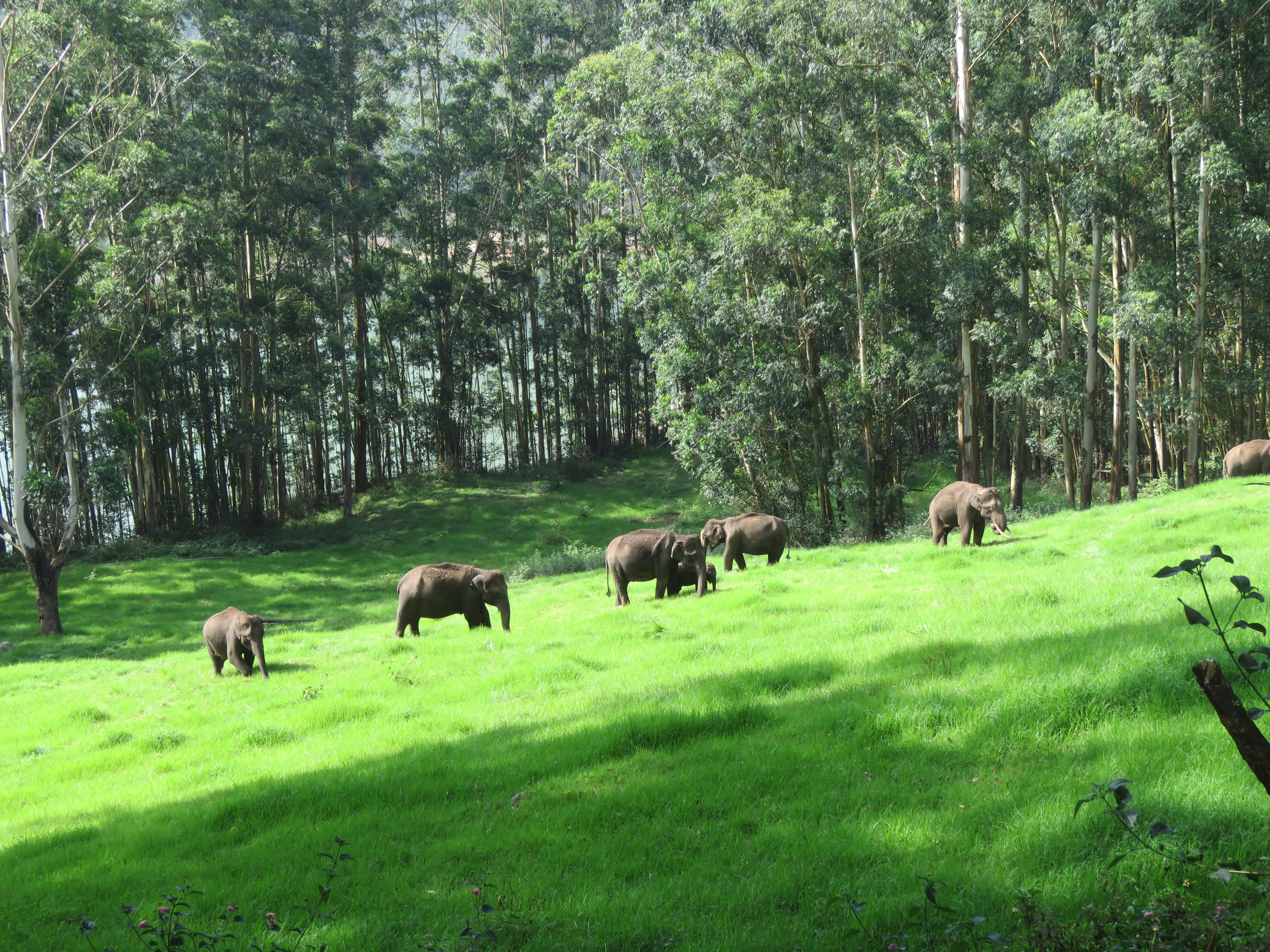
Wild Elephas in Kannan Devan Hills

== See also ==
- Kanan Devan Hills Plantations Company
- Munnar Plantation strike 2015
