= Kundala Dam =

Dam in Kerala, India

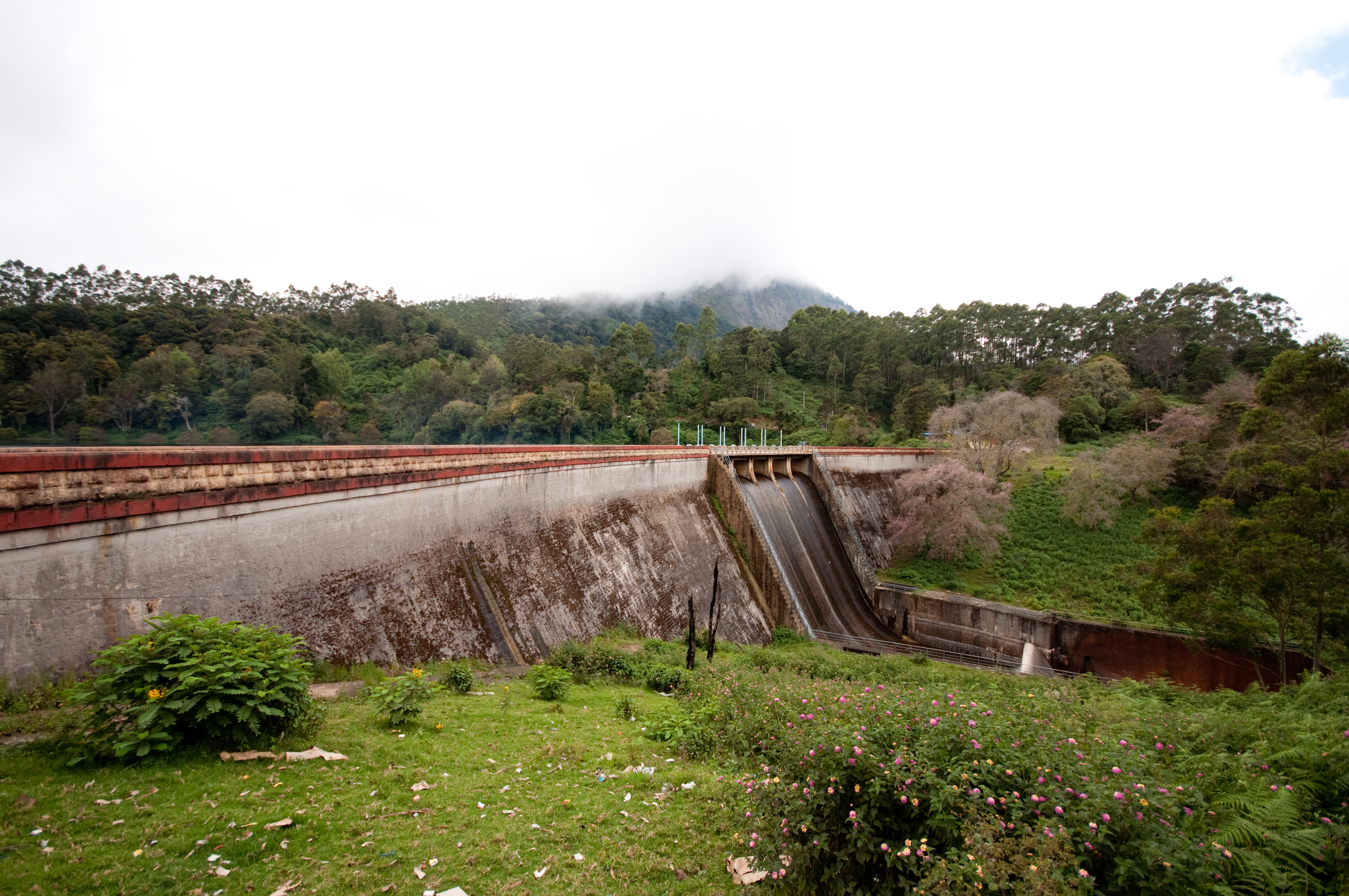
- In 2009

- Location within Kerala Location within India
- Official name: Setuparvatipuram Dam
- Country: India
- Location: Idukki, Kerala
- Coordinates: 10°8′37″N 77°11′15″E
- Purpose: Power
- Status: Operational
- Opening date: 1947 (79 years ago)
- Owner: Kerala State Electricity Board

Dam and spillways
- Type of dam: Gravity dam
- Impounds: Muthirapuzha River
- Height (foundation): 36.94 m (121.2 ft)
- Length: 259.38 m (851.0 ft)
- Elevation at crest: 1,756.86 m (5,764.0 ft)
- Spillways: 5
- Spillway type: Ogee type
- Spillway capacity: 183.95 m^{3}/s (6,496 cu ft/s)

Reservoir
- Creates: Kundala Reservoir
- Total capacity: 77,900,000 m^{3} (2.75×10^{9} cu ft)
- Active capacity: 76,500,000 m^{3} (2.70×10^{9} cu ft)
- Surface area: 0.0047 km^{2} (0.0018 sq mi)
- Maximum water depth: 1,759.3 m (5,772 ft)
- Normal elevation: 1,758.69 m (5,770.0 ft)

Pallivasal Power Station
- Coordinates: 10°01′53″N 77°03′17″E
- Operator: Kerala State Electricity Board
- Commission date: March 19, 1940 (86 years ago)
- Turbines: 3 × 5 MW & 3 × 7.5 MW (Pelton-type)
- Installed capacity: 37.50 MW
- Annual generation: 284 MU
- Website; Official website

Kundala Dam, also known as Setuparvatipuram Dam, is a masonry gravity dam built on Muthirapuzha River in Mattupetty panchayat of Idukki district in Kerala, India. It is part of the Pallivasal Hydroelectric Project, the first hydroelectric project in Kerala. The dam is considered to be Asia's first arch dam. It has a height of 46.93 m (154.0 ft) and length of 259.38 m (851.0 ft). Release from dam is to river Palar and taluks through which release flow are Udumbanchola, Devikulam, Kothamangalam, Muvattupuzha, Kunnathunadu, Aluva, Kodungalloor and Paravur.

== Spillway ==
Spillways are Ogee-type and are 5 in numbers. Vertical lift, each of size 5.18 x 2.74 m is fitted on the spillways.

== Location ==
The location of the dam is at a distance of 20 km (12 mi) from Munnar. It is a major tourist destination near Munnar. Kundala dam is located on the way to Top Station. Tourist places like Pampadumchola National Park, Kurinjimalai Sanctuary and Meesappulimalai are close to this dam.

== Reservoir ==
Full Reservoir Level (FRL) is 1,758.7 m (5,770 ft) and Minimum Drawdown level (MDDL) is 1,735.84 m (5,695.0 ft). Effective Storage at FRL is 77,870,000 m^{3} (2.750×10^{9} cu ft) and Generation potential at FRL is 22.74 MU. The water stored in the Kundala reservoir is released through the Palar River to Mattupetty dam located downstream. The water stored in the Mattupetty reservoir is released to downstream via a canal to a power house. Kundala reservoir has become a tourist spot.

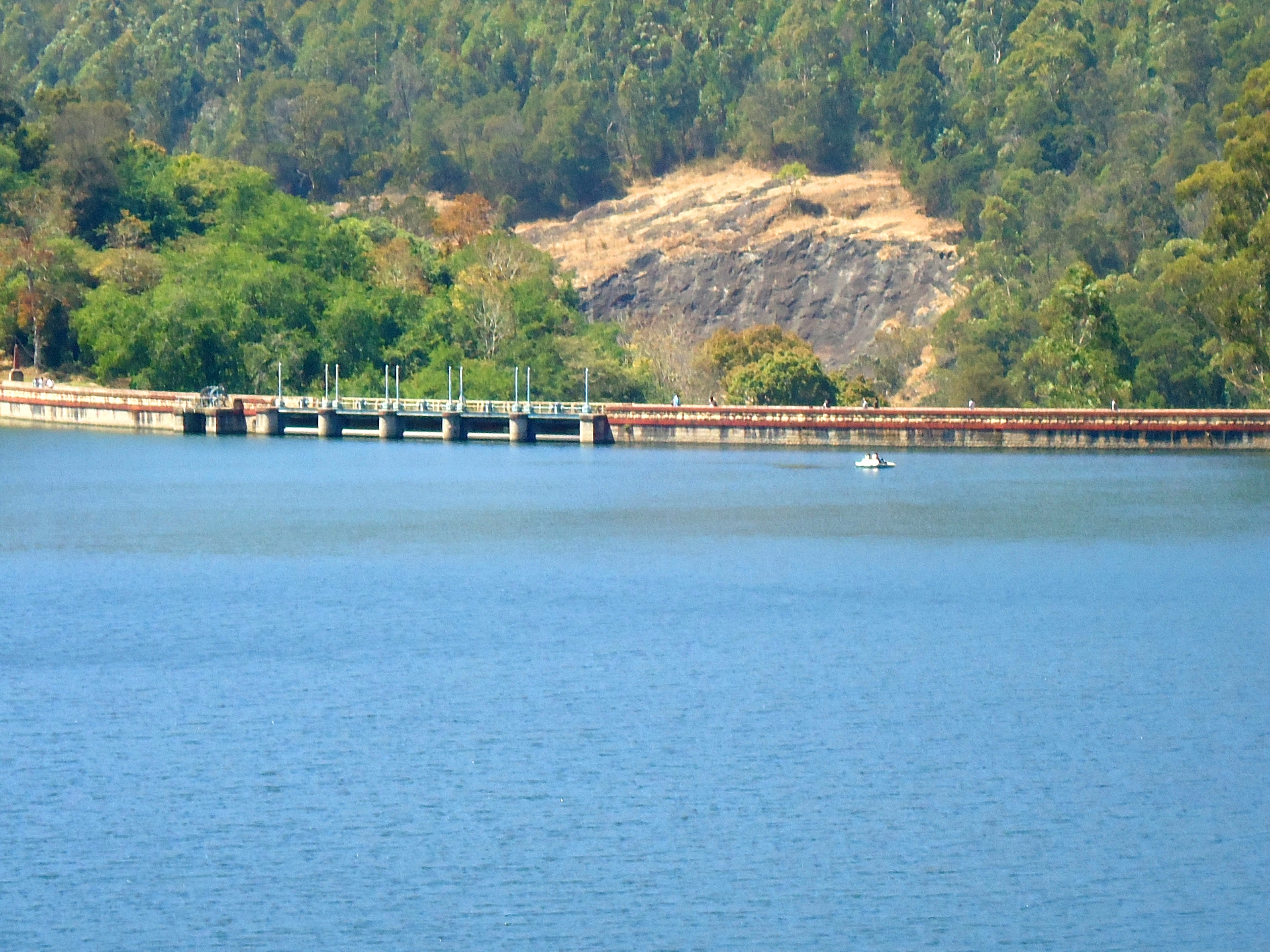
Dam and reservoir

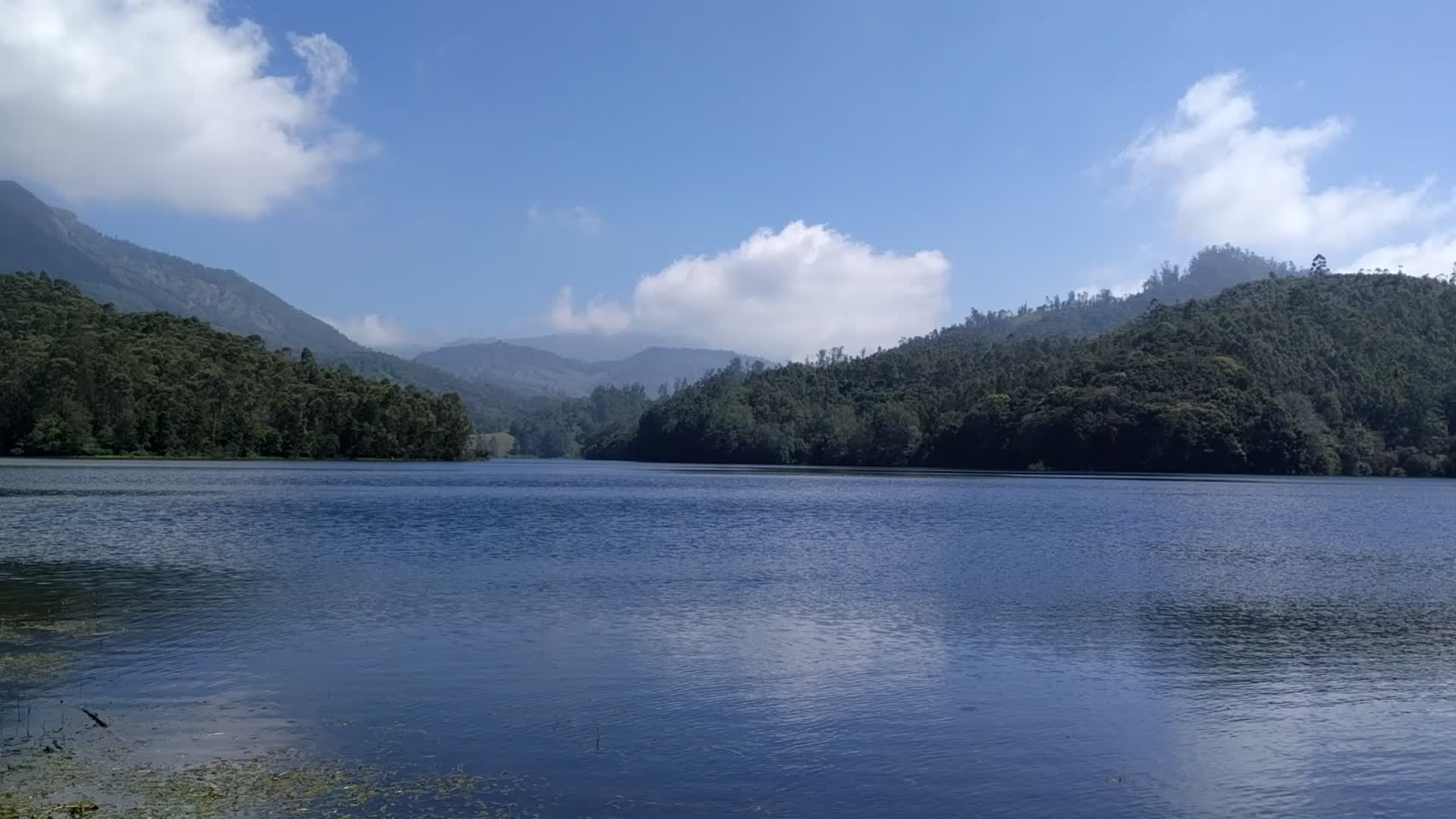
Reservoir

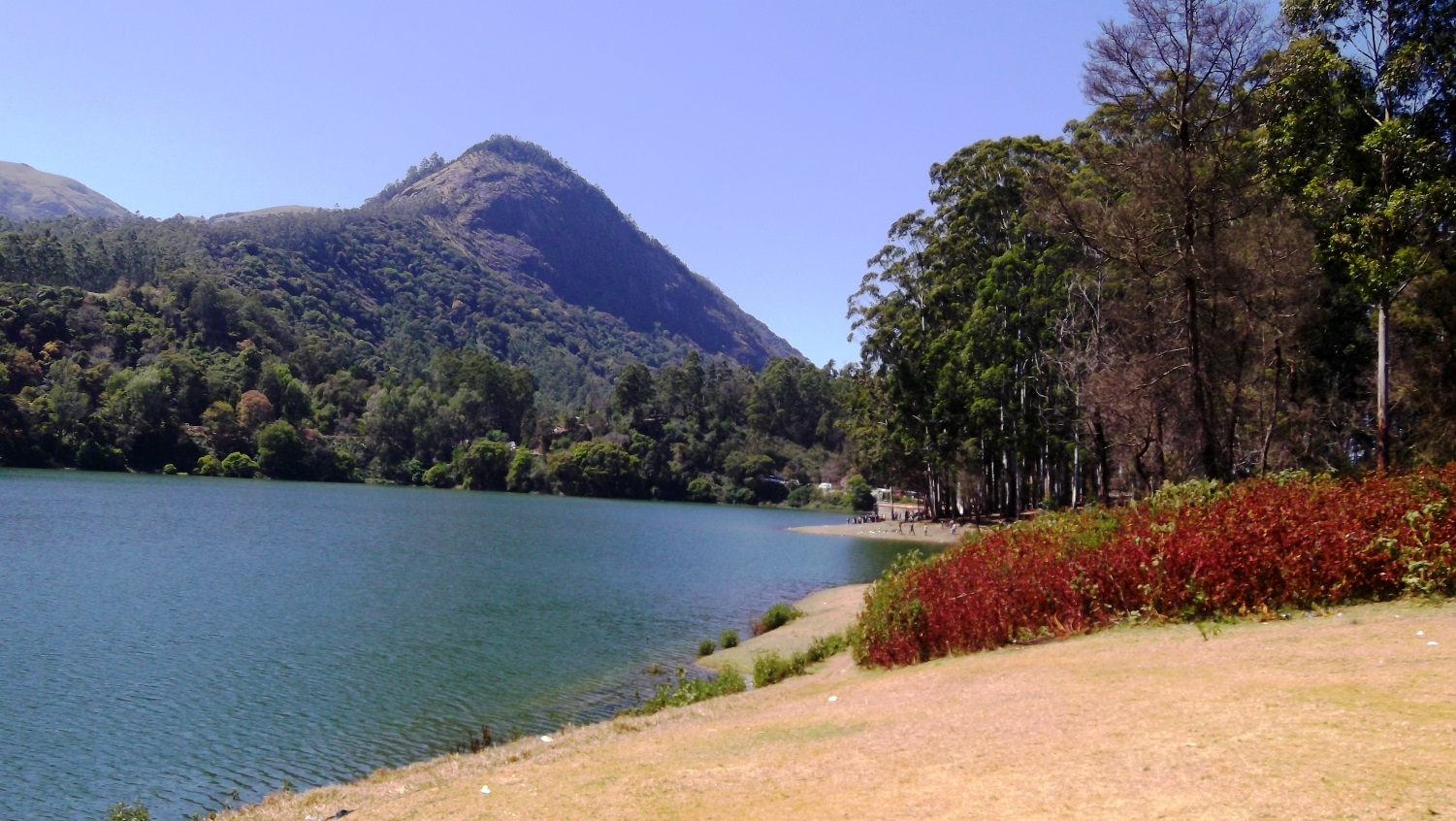
Reservoir

== Hydroelectric project ==
Pallivasal Hydroelectric Project, which is the first hydroelectric project in Kerala, uses the water from Kundala dam. The project was completed in two stages. In the first stage, just a run-of-the-river scheme was initially introduced with three units having capacity of 4.5 MW each. The first unit of the Pallivasal power station was commissioned on 19 March 1940. The second unit on 2 February 1941 and the third unit on 19 February. Kundala and Mattupetty dams together contributed about 65,000,000 m^{3} (2.3×10^{9} cu ft) of storage.

== See also ==
- Pallivasal Hydro Electric Project
- List of dams and reservoirs in Kerala
