= Lockhart Tea Park =

Tea valley in Kerala, India

Lockhart Tea Park is a tea valley located in the Munnar-Thekkady road in Munnar, Kerala. The valley is adjacent to Chokramudi Hill and Devimalai Hill.

The park has a tea factory which has an annual production of about 20 million kilograms. The factory is owned by Harrisons Malayalam Limited, a top South Indian tea cultivator. It has a museum that exhibits photographs and machinery of tea production which were used in early days.
