= Mattupetty Dam =

Dam in the mountains of Kerala, India

Mattupetty Dam മാട്ടുപെട്ടി അണക്കെട്ട്
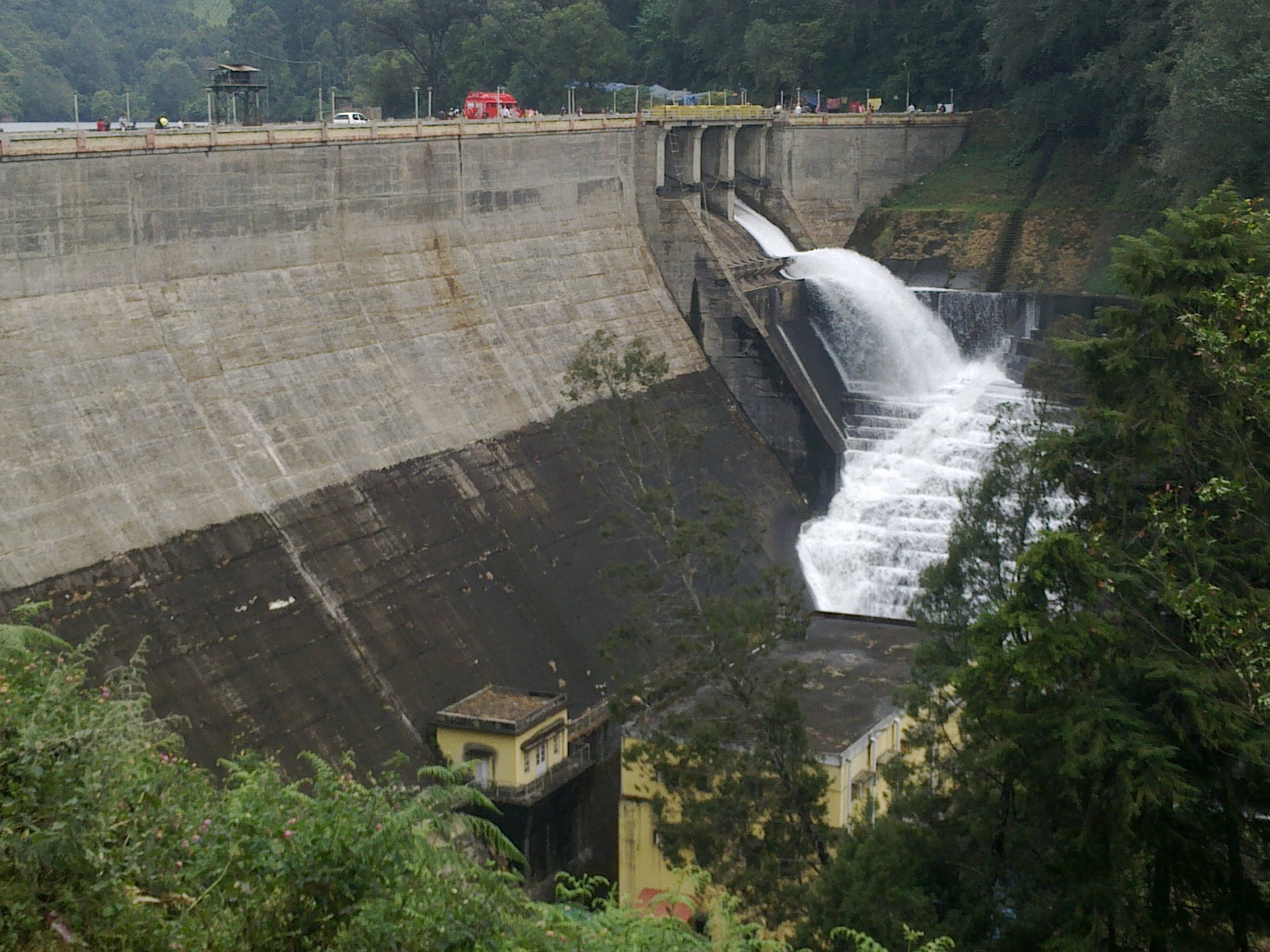

- Location within India Location within Kerala Location within India
- Location: Kannan Devan Hills, Idukki district, Kerala, India
- Coordinates: 10.106°N 77.124°E
- Construction began: 1949
- Opening date: 1953
- Construction cost: ₹2.2 crore (US$240,000)
- Operator: Government of Kerala

Reservoir
- Creates: Mattupetty
- Total capacity: 55.4 Million Cubic Meter
- Catchment area: 105 Square kilometer
- Surface area: 323.75 Hectare

Power Station
- Hydraulic head: 46.6 meter

Mattupetty Dam, Kannan Devan Hills in Idukki District, is a storage concrete gravity dam built in the mountains of Kerala, India, to conserve water for hydroelectricity. It has been a vital source of power and huge revenue for Idukki District. The large amount of perennially available water allows wild animals and birds to flourish. Construction of the dam was led by E.U. Philipose, Superintending Engineer, Kerala State Electricity Board. The height of the dam is 83.35 metres (273.5 ft) and the length is 237.74 metres (780.0 ft). Taluks through which the release flows are Udumpanchola, Devikulam, Kothamangalam, Muvattupuzha, Kunnathunadu, Aluva, Kodungalloor and Paravur.

== Specifications ==
- Latitude : 10⁰ 06′ 23 ” N
- Longitude: 77⁰ 07′ 26” E
- Panchayath : Madupetty
- Village : KDH Village
- District : Idukki
- River Basin : Muthirapuzha
- River : Muthirapuzha
- Release from Dam to river : Muthirapuzha
- Type of Dam : Free-Fall Gravity
- Construction : Rebar-Reinforced Concrete
- Classification : HH ( High Height)
- Full Reservoir Level ( FRL): EL 1599.59 m
- Full Reservoir Level ( FRL) : EL 1599.59 m
- Storage at FRL : 55.23 Mm3
- Height from deepest foundation : 83.35 m
- Length : 237.74 m
- Spillway : Ogee type- 3 Nos. Radial gates, each of size 6.70 x 4.95 m

Munnar is located near the confluence of the mountain streams of Muthirappuzha River, Chanduvarai River and Kundale River.

The reservoir is also known to be one of the visiting grounds of elephants in the region.

== Gallery ==
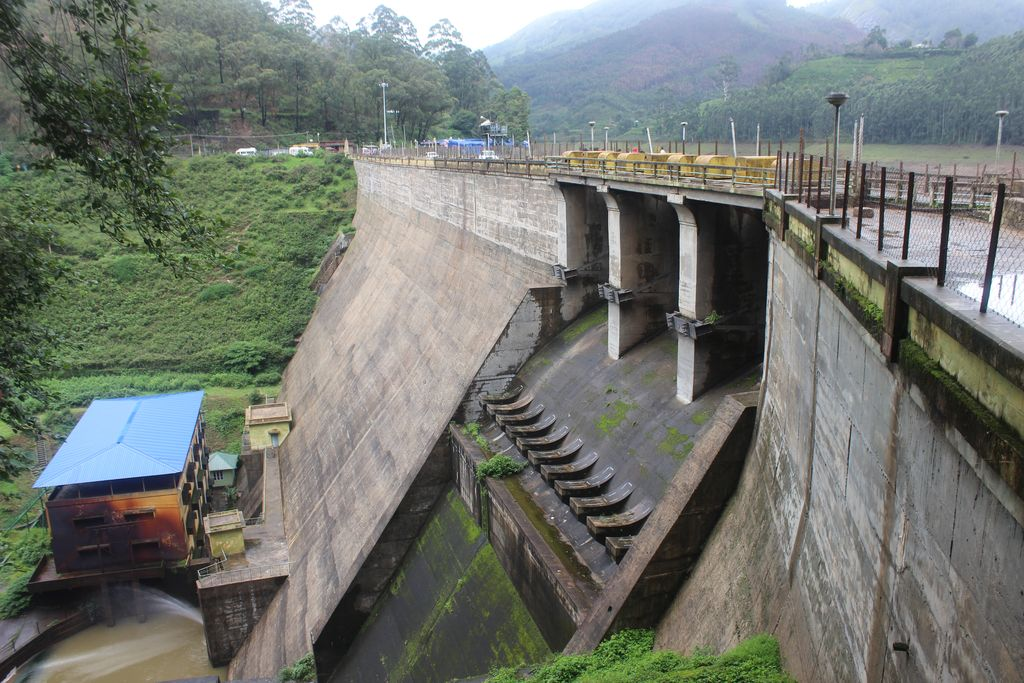
Maduppetty dam

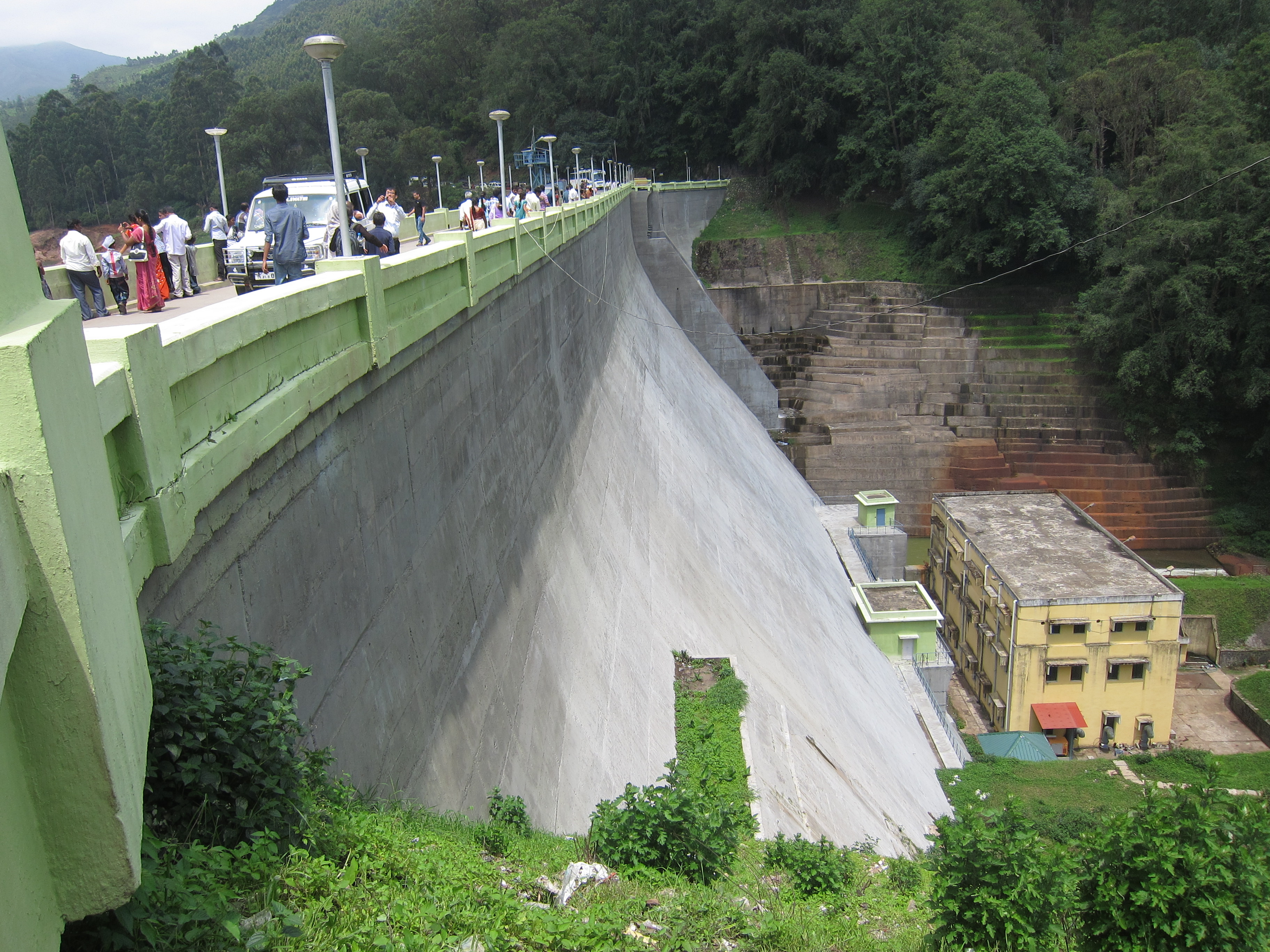

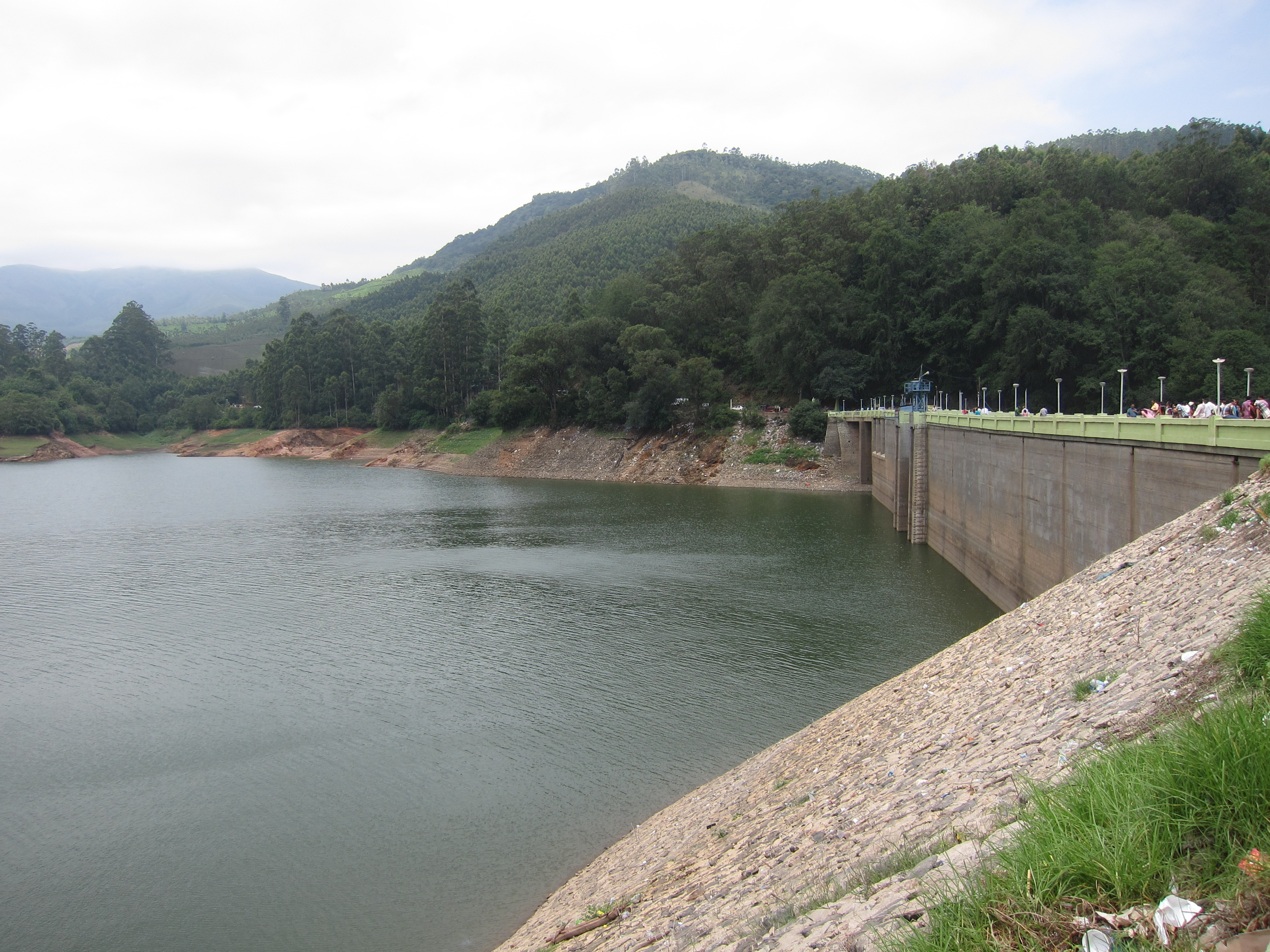

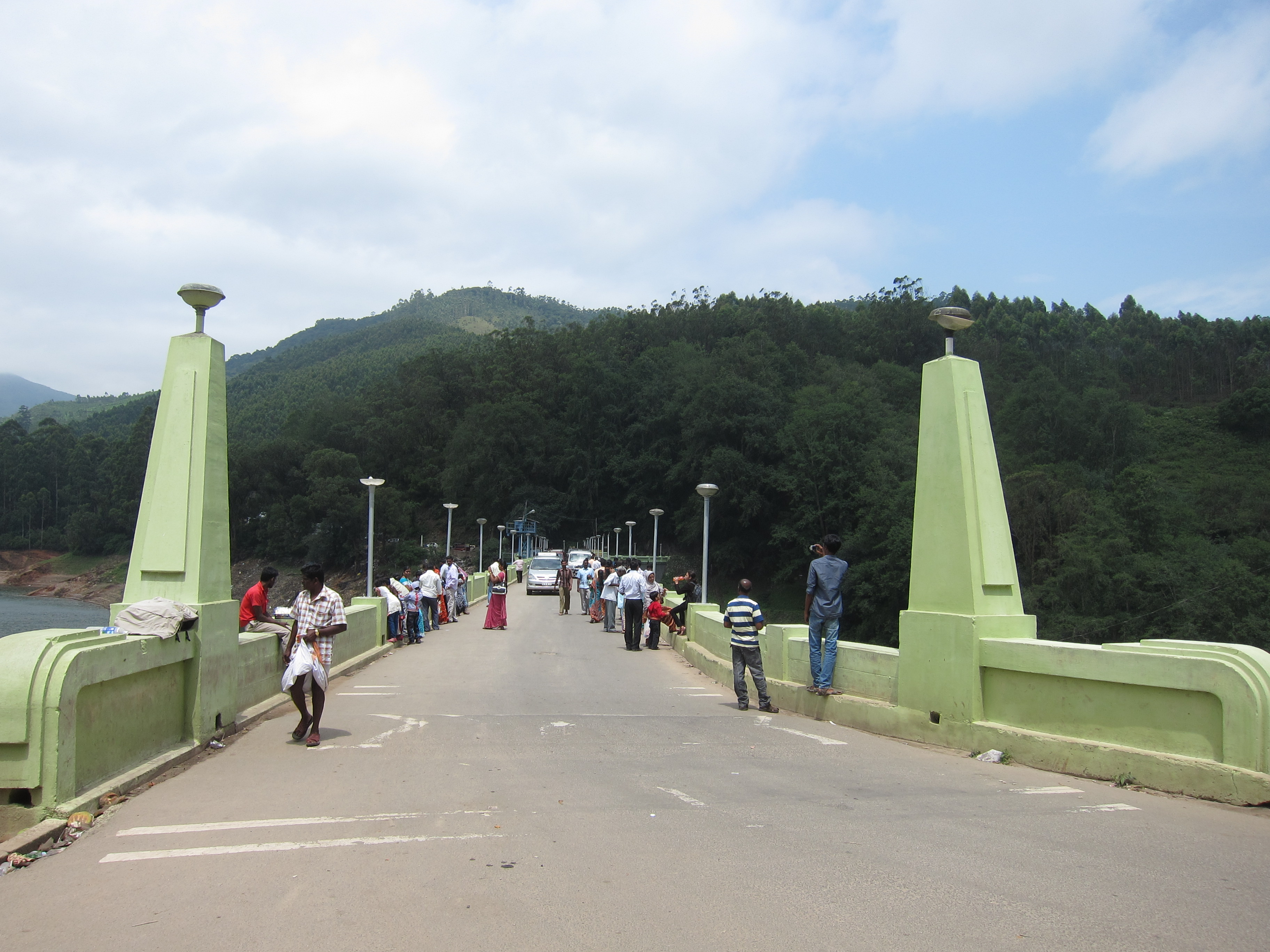
Barrage

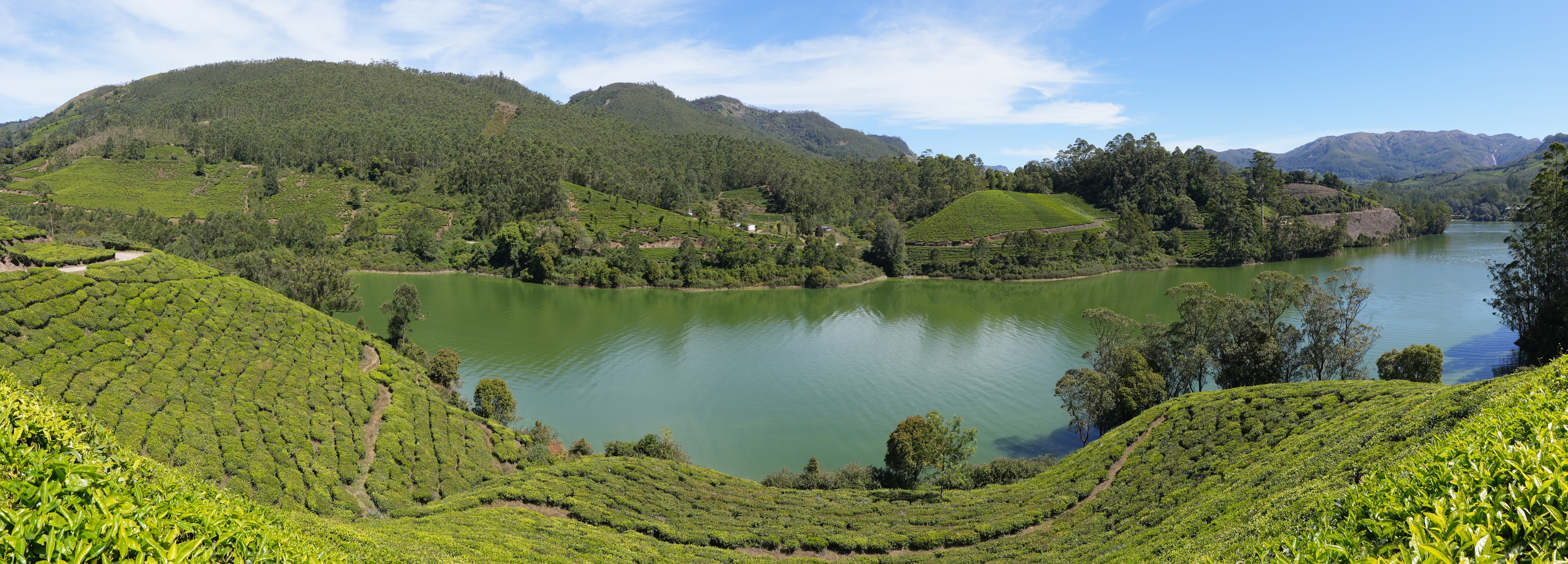
Western end of reservoir with tea plantation
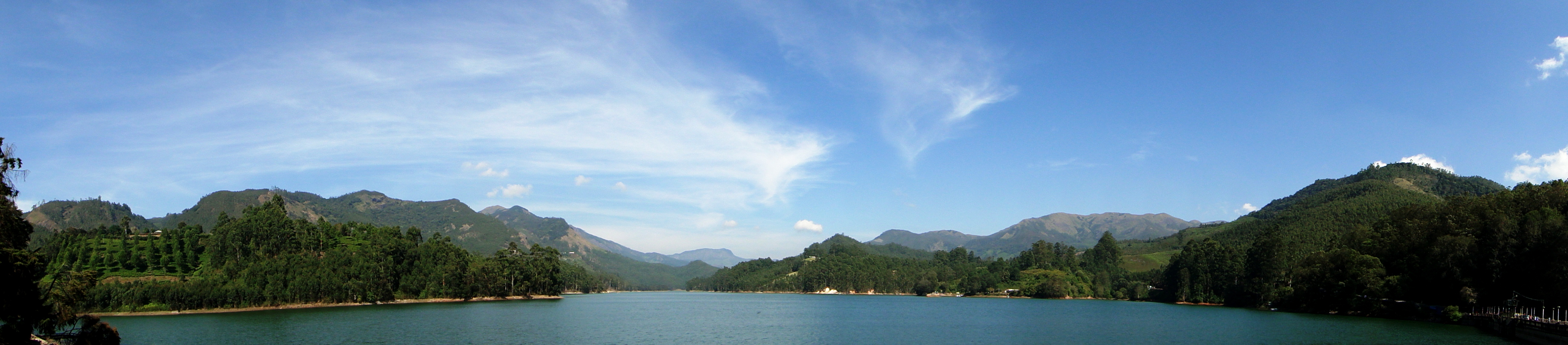
Reservoir. Looking ENE. Taken from near barrage.

== See also ==
- List of dams and reservoirs in India
- Pallivasal Hydro Electric Project
