= Shirley Palmer (physician) =

English physician and medical writer

Shirley Palmer MRCS
- Born: Shirley Palmer; August 27, 1786; Coleshill, Warwickshire, England
- Died: November 11, 1852 (aged 66); Tamworth, Staffordshire, England
- Education: Coleshill Grammar School; Harrow School
- Alma mater: University of Glasgow (MD)
- Occupations: Physician and medical writer

Shirley Palmer, MRCS (1786–1852) was an English physician and medical writer.

== Life ==
Born at Coleshill, Warwickshire, 27 August 1786, Shirley Palmer was the son of Edward Palmer, solicitor, by his second wife, Benedicta Mears. His early education was at Coleshill Grammar School, and at Harrow, under Joseph Drury. Palmer later became a pupil of Lichfield surgeon Thomas Salt (father of Egyptologist Henry Salt), and subsequently studied under John Abernethy at St. Bartholomew's Hospital, London. He became a member of the Royal College of Surgeons in 1807, and graduated MD at Glasgow in 1815.

Settling at Tamworth, Staffordshire, he was twice elected high bailiff of the town. In 1831 he established a practice at Birmingham, but still maintained his residence and connection at Tamworth. He died on 11 November 1852, at Tamworth, and was buried in the new churchyard, which had once formed part of his garden. He married, on 29 September 1813, Marie Josephine Minette Breheault, a French refugee of good family. Charles Ferrars Palmer was their son.

== Works ==
Palmer published:

1. The Swiss Exile, a juvenile denunciation of Napoleon in heroic verse in thirty or forty pages (4to, n.d.), dedicated to Anna Seward.
2. Popular Illustrations of Medicine, London, 1829, 8vo.
3. Popular Lectures on the Vertebrated Animals of the British Islands, London, 1832, 8vo.
4. A Pentaglot Dictionary [French, English, Greek, Latin, and German] of the Terms employed in Anatomy, Physiology, Pathology, practical Medicine, &c., London, 1845.

Palmer edited the New Medical and Physical Journal, along with William Shearman and James Johnson, from 1815 to 1819; the London Medical Repository, along with D. Uwins and Samuel Frederick Gray, from 1819 to 1821. To both periodicals he contributed largely, as well as to the Lichfield Mercury while John Woolrich was editor, and to the first five volumes of the Analyst.

== Bibliography ==
- Palmer, Charles Ferrers Raymond (1895). "Palmer, Shirley" . In Lee, Sidney (ed.). Dictionary of National Biography. Vol. 43. London: Smith, Elder & Co. pp. 159–160.
- Palmer, C. F. R.; Johnson, D. A. (2004). "Palmer, Shirley (1786–1852)". In Oxford Dictionary of National Biography. Oxford: Oxford University Press.
