= John Bunnell Davis =

John Bunnell Davis (1780–1824) was an English physician, now regarded as a pioneer of paediatrics in the United Kingdom. He published early work on child mortality, and was a founder of the dispensary that became the Royal Waterloo Hospital for Children and Women (in operation to 1976).

== Early life ==
The son of a surgeon at Thetford, Davis was born in 1780 at Clare, Suffolk. He was educated for his father's profession at Guy's Hospital and St Thomas's Hospital, and became a member of the corporation of surgeons.

== In France ==
Soon after receiving his diploma he went as medical attendant to a family travelling in France during the Peace of Amiens. He studied at Montpellier, and there graduated M.D. in 1803. At the end of the Peace, he with many other British people was detained by the French authorities. In confinement at Verdun, he published Observations on Precipitate Burial and the Diagnosis of Death. He sent it to Jean-Nicolas Corvisart, Napoleon's physician, and his petition for release was granted.

== Physician ==
Davis returned to England in May 1806. He went to study at the University of Edinburgh, and graduated M.D. there 24 June 1808, reading a dissertation on phthisis. In September 1809 he was appointed a hospital mate to the British armed forces. At a hospital at Ipswich, he attended troops invalided home from the Walcheren expedition. He was admitted a licentiate of the Royal College of Physicians, London, in 1810. He then settled in practice in London. He died on 28 September 1824, leaving a widow and three children.

== Dispensary work ==
In 1816 Davis had a share in founding on St Andrew's Hill (a street in EC4, City of London), the Universal Dispensary for Sick Indigent Children, the successor to a short-lived children's hospital set up in 1769. The founding group, including also Sir Matthew Wood the Lord Mayor, the Duke of Kent and the Duke of Sussex, met at the London Tavern that year. He attended this institution as physician, and published an account of it in 1821.

Davis played a large part in establishing the funding of the dispensary—Universal in that it took as patients children under 12 from anywhere, in cases of suffering not requiring a recommendation—by assiduous letter-writing. In the first year 2000 children were treated. In 1819 Thomas Addison was appointed as a second physician. Successors included Thomas Copeland, Robert Bentley Todd, and Charles West who went on to found Great Ormond Street Hospital. In 1820 the surgeons were Walter Cooper Dendy and John A. Gilham.

Success brought initially the need for subsidiary sites around London, and then from 1822 a move to premises south of the river, at the junction of Waterloo Road and Stamford Road. The new name was Royal Universal Infirmary for Children, with a foundation stone laid in 1823. Davis's death in 1824 came shortly before the new building was completed. The character of the institution changed in 1856, with annual donations from the Hayles Estate charity (see Walcot Foundation): it admitted inpatients for the first time, and its title increased its scope to "Children and Women". Two further name changes were to Royal Hospital for Women and Children in 1875, and in 1903 when the rebuilt building became he Royal Waterloo Hospital for Children and Women.

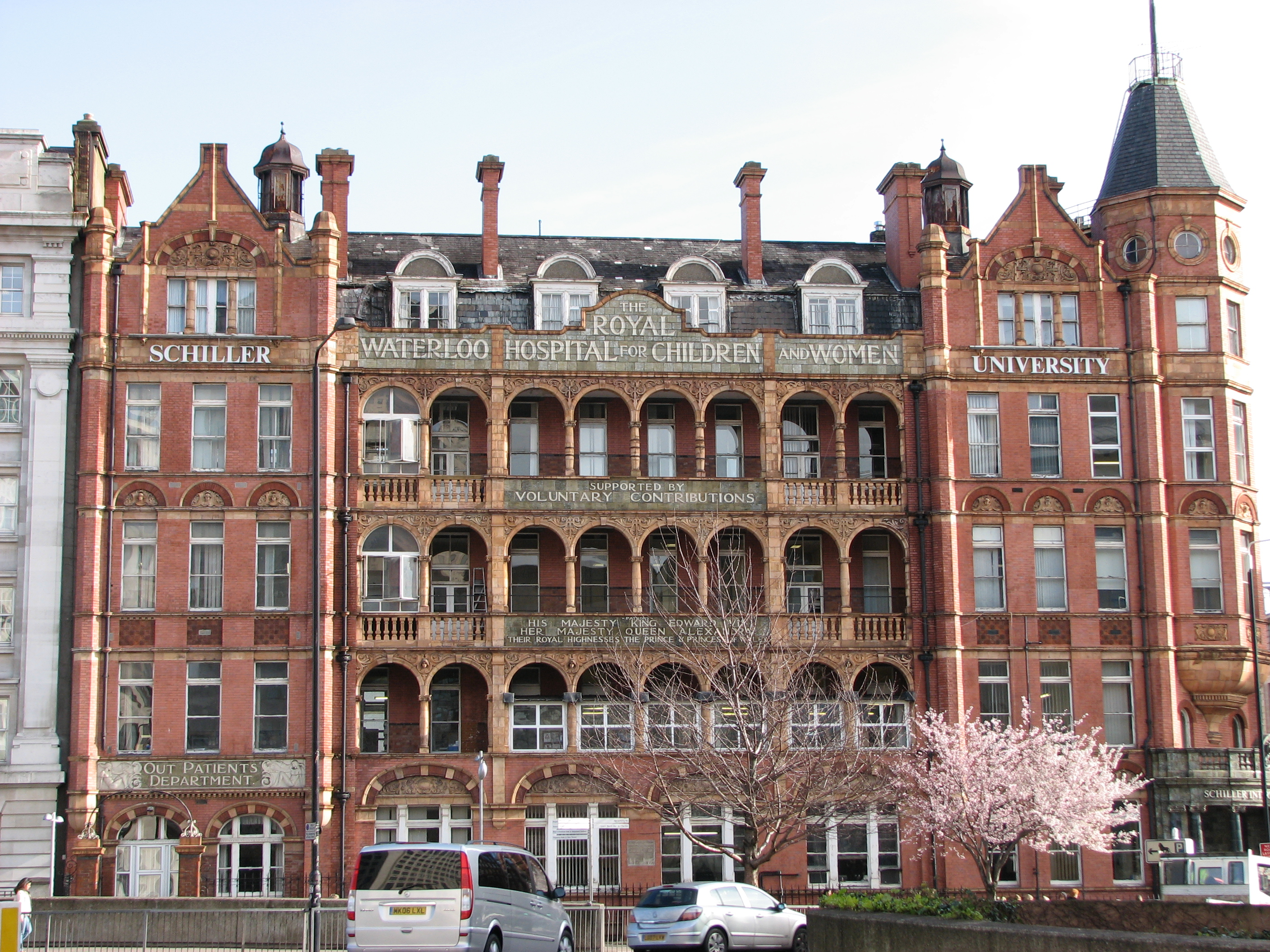
Disused Waterloo Royal Hospital, 2008 photograph

== Works ==
Davis published:

- The Ancient and Modern History of Nice, London, 1807. Nice was a destination for invalids, and the book considers the suitability of its climate.
- More subjects than one concerning France and the French People, London, 1807.
- The Origin and Description of Bognor, London, 1807.
- A Scientific and Popular View of the Fever at Walcheren and its consequences as they appeared in the British troops returned from the late expedition, with an account of the Morbid Anatomy of the Body and the Efficacy of Drastic Purges and Mercury in the treatment of this Disease, London, 1810. Davis's collection of post-mortem records show that what was called Walcheren fever included cases of several kinds: dysentery, enteric fever, and enteric fever complicated with malarial fever.
- Cursory Inquiry into the Principal Causes of Mortality among Children, London, 1817.
- Annals historical and medical during the first four years of the Universal Dispensary for Children, St. Andrew's Hill, Doctors' Commons, founded in 1816, London, 1821.
