= Coleshill Manor =

Manor building in Warwickshire, England

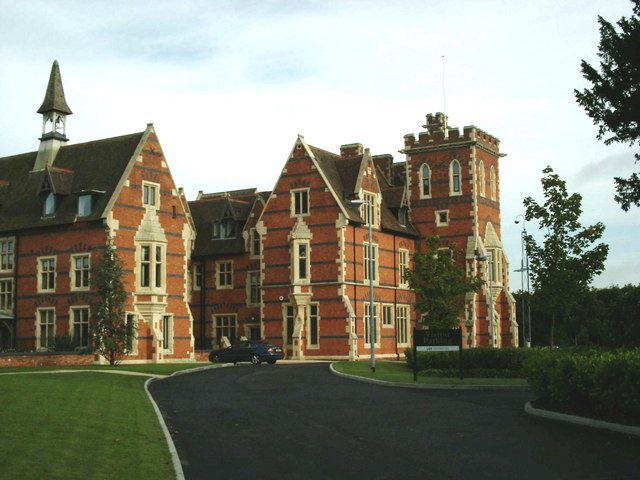
The third Coleshill Manor in 2006

Coleshill Manor, or Coleshill Hall, is a Grade II Listed office complex within a former moated building that formed the seat of the Lord of the Manor of Coleshill, Warwickshire, England. A house has existed on the site since at least 1285.

== History ==
=== First building ===
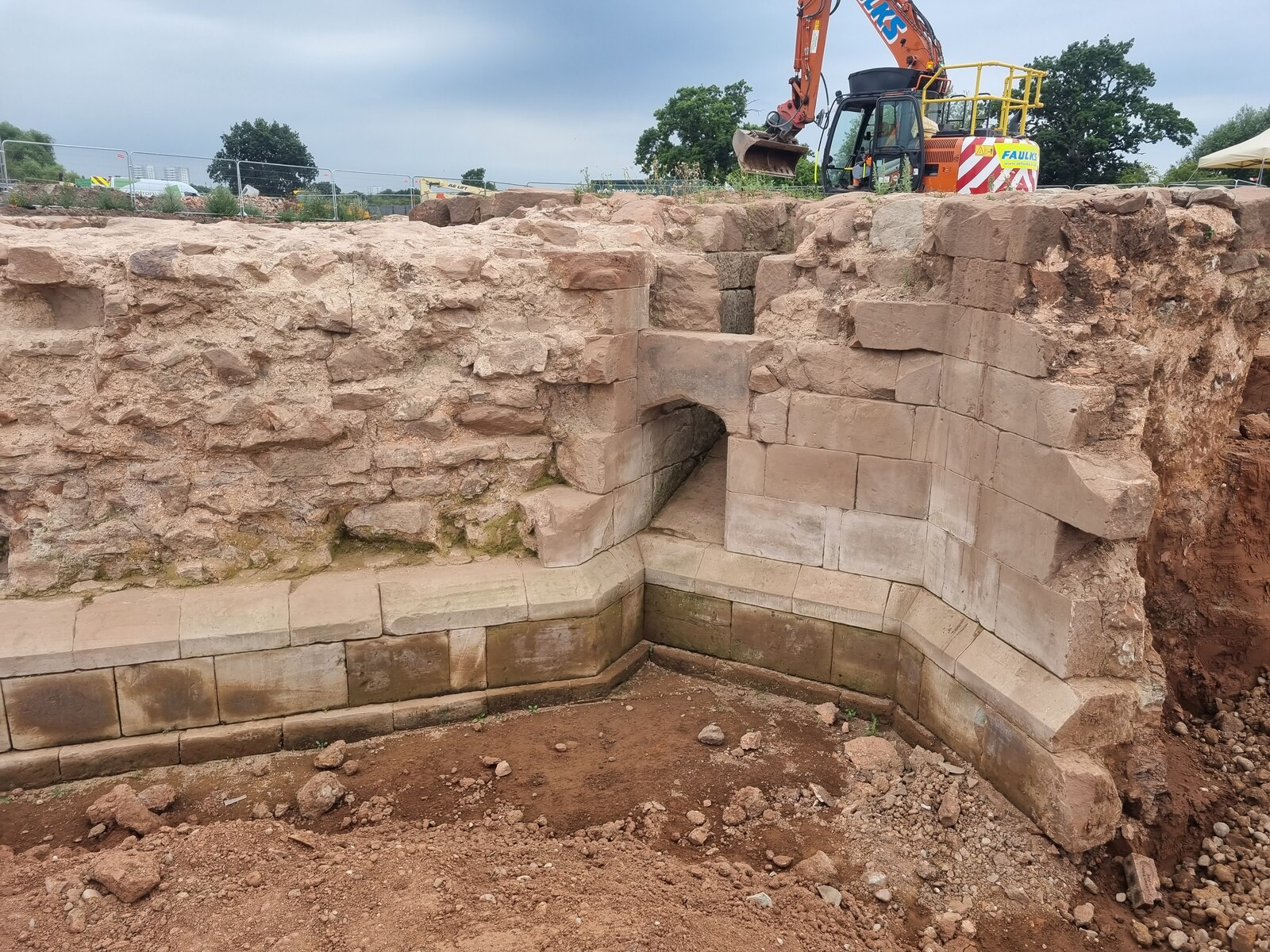
Excavated remains of the first Coleshill Manor in 2022

King Edward I granted the first Coleshill Manor to John de Clinton, elder, in 1284 or 1285 and claimed by prescription within the lordship of Coleshill, Assize of bread and ale, gallows, pillory, tumbrell and court leet, infangthef and utfangthef, a market, fair, and free warren.

Coleshill Manor then passed to this branch of Sir Simon Mountford who moated the manor houses at Coleshill and Kingshurst. King Henry VII granted Coleshill Manor and its lands to Simon Digby in 1496 following the execution and forfeiture of Sir Simon de Montford for supporting the rebellion of Perkin Warbeck. The surviving building was completed during the 15th century.

A survey of the building and its inventory was conducted in 1628, and a skirmish took place at Coleshill Manor during the Battle of Curdworth Bridge (English Civil War) in August 1642. It was then abandoned during the 1650s and was replaced with another house.

=== Second and third buildings ===
The second house was built during the late 17th century and was demolished after it was damaged by a fire between 1798 and 1801, with all traces of the building above ground removed by c. 1810.

The third house was constructed in 1873 and was initially the seat of the Wingfield-Digby family. It was then in use as a hospital between 1929 and 2010. Today it is an office complex.

== Excavation ==
During the construction of the High Speed 2 railway, the site of the first Coleshill Manor was identified and excavated between 2020 and 2023. Among the discoveries included the ruins of the gatehouse and around forty musket balls fired at the building during the Battle of Curdworth Bridge.

== Description ==
The first house was a large moated building with a drawbridge and it had a garden comparable in size to the surviving example at Kenilworth Castle. It had two angular towers towards the front of the building and the moat was octagonal.

The stone gatehouse was roughly 10 metres (33 ft) by 10 metres (33 ft) in size and was built using ashlar masonry.
