= Eternal Wall of Answered Prayer =

Planned monument to be built in Coleshill, England

Eternal Wall of Answered Prayer is a planned Christian monument to be built in Coleshill, near Birmingham, England. It will be 169 feet (51 m) tall, more than twice the size of the Angel of the North, and visible from both the M6 and M42 motorways. The structure is designed as an infinity loop, symbolizing the eternal nature of God, and will feature one million bricks, each digitally linked to a story of answered prayer.

== History and development ==
The project was conceived by Richard Gamble, a former Leicester City Football Club chaplain, who said the idea first came to him in 2004 while carrying a wooden cross for Easter. Initially met with scepticism, the idea gained traction in 2016 when Gamble launched a crowdfunding campaign, raising £47,000 for a design competition run by the Royal Institute of British Architects. The winning design, an infinity loop, was created by Snug Architects.

North Warwickshire Borough Council granted planning permission in 2020, and final government approval was secured later that year. Originally, construction was due to begin in 2021, with the monument opening in 2022, but the project was delayed due to rising costs, inflation, and design complexities. Construction was expected to begin in 2025, with completion scheduled for 2028. The total cost is estimated at £40 million, largely funded by public donations.

== Design and features ==
The monument will be built using one million bricks, each digitally linked to a specific answered prayer. Visitors will be able to use an app to scan bricks and read individual stories.

In addition to the monument itself, the site will feature a visitor centre, café, bookstore, and a 24-hour on-site chaplaincy service, creating approximately 20 full-time jobs.

== Location and visibility ==
The Eternal Wall of Answered Prayer will be in Coleshill, Warwickshire, near Birmingham Airport. It will be visible from up to six miles away and will be seen by thousands of motorists daily on the M6 and M42 motorways.

== Cultural and religious significance ==
The monument aims to be a "place of hope," commemorating answered prayers from Christians across the UK. Former West Midlands Mayor Andy Street has described it as a landmark that will "help us remember the Christian heritage of our nation."

Labour MP Stephen Timms has called the project an "inspiring idea," stating that it will make a "big impact on the national consciousness" and serve as a reflection of the role of faith and prayer in British history.
