= Coleshill, Warwickshire =

Market town in Warwickshire, England

Coordinates: 52.499°N 1.708°W

Coleshill
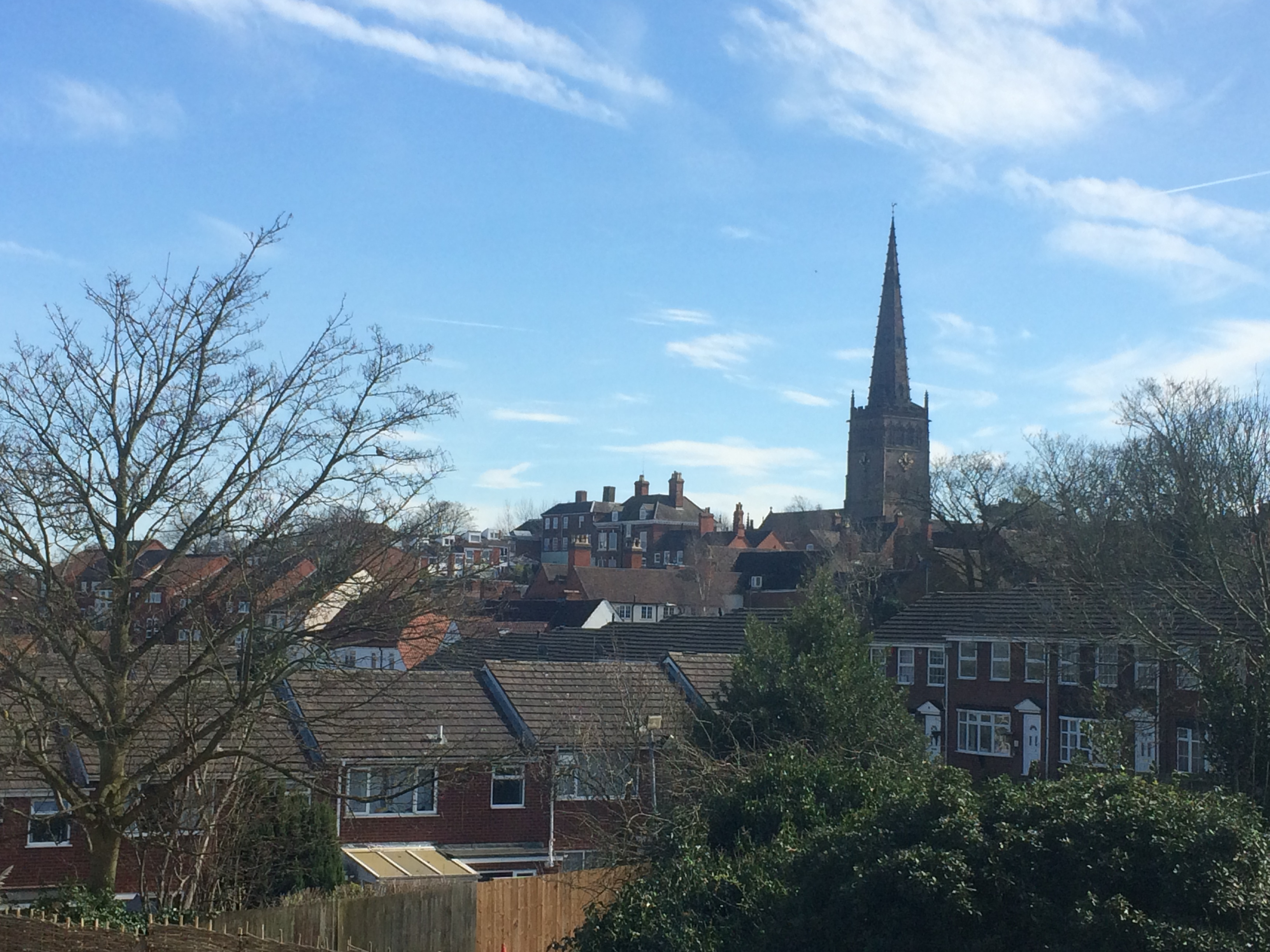
- Seen from the northwest with the Church of St. Peter and St. Paul in view, 2017

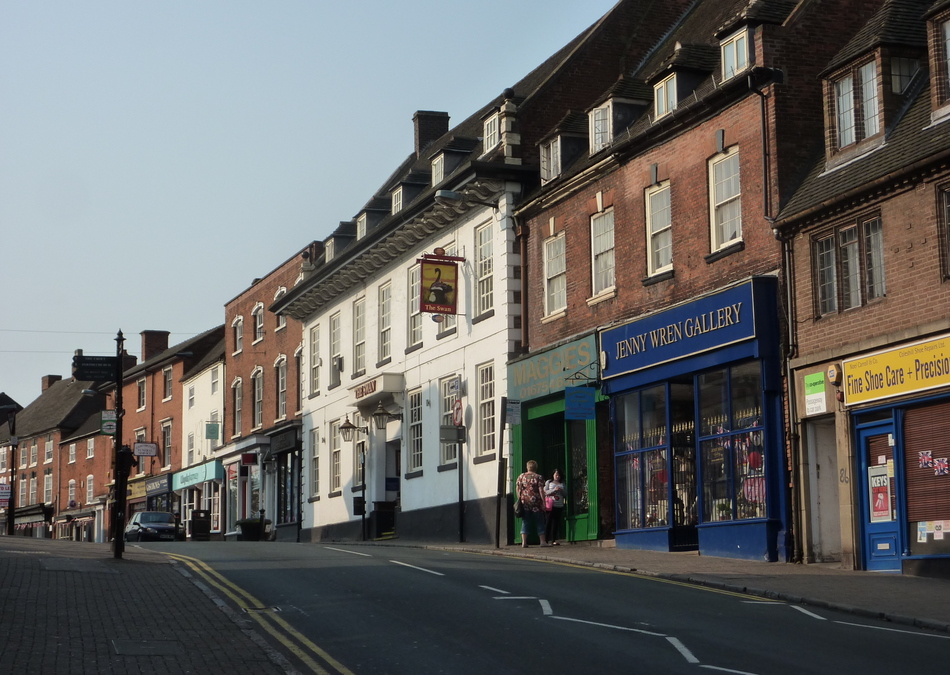
- High Street in 2011

- Location within Warwickshire
- Population: 6,896 (2021 census)
- OS grid reference: SP2089
- Civil parish: Coleshill
- District: North Warwickshire
- Shire county: Warwickshire
- Region: West Midlands
- Country: England
- Sovereign state: United Kingdom
- Post town: Birmingham
- Postcode district: B46
- Dialling code: 01675
- Police: Warwickshire
- Fire: Warwickshire
- Ambulance: West Midlands
- UK Parliament: North Warwickshire and Bedworth

Coleshill (/ˈkoʊzɪl/ KOH-zil) is a market town and civil parish in the North Warwickshire district of Warwickshire, England, taking its name from the River Cole, on which it stands. It had a population of 6,896 in the 2021 census, and is situated 11 miles (18 km) east of Birmingham, 8.5 miles (13.7 km) southeast of Sutton Coldfield, 11 miles (18 km) south of Tamworth, 13 miles (21 km) northwest of Coventry by road and 12.5 miles (20 km) west of Nuneaton. It borders the suburban parish village of Kingshurst in the Metropolitan Borough of Solihull to the west. It is also home to the 505-year-old Coleshill School seated next to the dual carriageway.

== History ==
Coleshill began life in the Iron Age, before the Roman conquest of 43 AD at the Grimstock Hill Romano-British settlement, north of the River Cole. Evidence of hut circles were found by archaeologists at the end of the 1970s. These excavations showed that throughout the Roman period there was a Romano-Celtic temple on Grimstock Hill. It had developed over the earlier Iron Age huts and had gone through at least three phases of development. The area was at the junction of two powerful Celtic tribes – the Coritanii to the east from Leicester, and to the west the Cornovii from Viroconium Cornoviorum. In the post Roman or Arthurian period (the Dark Ages), the nucleus of Coleshill moved about a kilometre to the south, to the top of the hill. Here the present church is set and the medieval town developed around it.

By 1066 the town was a royal manor held by King Edward the Confessor and is recorded in the Domesday Book of 1086 as land held by William the Conqueror and the site of the court for the ancient hundred of Coleshill. In 1284/5 John de Clinton, elder, was granted Coleshill Manor by King Henry II, and claimed by prescription within the lordship of Coleshill, Assize of bread and ale, gallows, pillory, tumbrell and court leet, infangthef and utfangthef, a market, fair, and free warren. He died in 1316. His heir was his 12-year-old grandson, John, who subsequently married a daughter of Sir Roger Hilary, and died in 1353 or 1354 leaving one daughter Joan. She had as her first husband Sir John of Montfort, illegitimate son of Sir Peter de Montfort of Beaudesert.

Coleshill Manor then passed to this branch of Sir Simon de Montford who moated the manor houses at Coleshill and Kingshurst. King Henry VII granted Coleshill Manor and its lands to Simon Digby in 1496 following the execution and forfeiture of Sir Simon de Montford for supporting the rebellion of Perkin Warbeck. The (Wingfield-Digby) family descendants still hold the titles. Coleshill village was granted a market charter by King John in 1207, alongside Liverpool, Leek and Great Yarmouth. During the era of stagecoach and the turnpike trusts, Coleshill became important as a major staging post on the coaching roads from London to Chester, Liverpool and Holyhead. At one point there were over twenty inns in the town. The Coleshill to Lichfield Turnpike dates from 1743.

== Geography ==
Coleshill is located on a ridge between the rivers Cole and Blythe which converge to the north with the River Tame. It is adjacent to the border with West Midlands county, and is just outside Birmingham.

=== Climate ===
Climate data for Coleshill (1991–2020)
Month	Jan	Feb	Mar	Apr	May	Jun	Jul	Aug	Sep	Oct	Nov	Dec	Year
Record high °C (°F)	14.9 (58.8)	19.1 (66.4)	22.6 (72.7)	25.9 (78.6)	27.2 (81.0)	31.8 (89.2)	38.8 (101.8)	37.1 (98.8)	30.4 (86.7)	29.1 (84.4)	18.0 (64.4)	15.3 (59.5)	38.8 (101.8)
Mean daily maximum °C (°F)	7.3 (45.1)	8.0 (46.4)	10.5 (50.9)	13.5 (56.3)	16.6 (61.9)	19.6 (67.3)	22.0 (71.6)	21.5 (70.7)	18.6 (65.5)	14.2 (57.6)	10.2 (50.4)	7.6 (45.7)	14.2 (57.6)
Daily mean °C (°F)	4.5 (40.1)	4.8 (40.6)	6.7 (44.1)	9.0 (48.2)	11.9 (53.4)	14.8 (58.6)	17.0 (62.6)	16.8 (62.2)	14.3 (57.7)	10.8 (51.4)	7.2 (45.0)	4.8 (40.6)	10.2 (50.4)
Mean daily minimum °C (°F)	1.7 (35.1)	1.7 (35.1)	2.9 (37.2)	4.4 (39.9)	7.1 (44.8)	10.0 (50.0)	12.0 (53.6)	12.0 (53.6)	10.0 (50.0)	7.3 (45.1)	4.2 (39.6)	2.0 (35.6)	6.3 (43.3)
Record low °C (°F)	−10.9 (12.4)	−3.2 (26.2)	−7.5 (18.5)	−4.3 (24.3)	−1.8 (28.8)	2.0 (35.6)	4.6 (40.3)	3.9 (39.0)	0.9 (33.6)	−4.4 (24.1)	−10.0 (14.0)	−12.6 (9.3)	−12.6 (9.3)
Average precipitation mm (inches)	63.6 (2.50)	47.0 (1.85)	46.6 (1.83)	48.1 (1.89)	53.8 (2.12)	64.9 (2.56)	52.9 (2.08)	66.2 (2.61)	58.1 (2.29)	72.8 (2.87)	69.6 (2.74)	64.7 (2.55)	708.2 (27.88)
Average precipitation days (≥ 1.0 mm)	12.4	9.8	9.9	10.1	9.8	9.6	9.0	10.5	9.6	11.6	13.0	11.7	127.1
Mean monthly sunshine hours	55.1	72.0	116.7	147.1	193.3	192.6	194.0	170.7	130.7	100.2	66.2	62.6	1,501.3
Source 1: Met Office
Source 2: Starlings Roost Weather

== Demographics ==
At the 2021 census, the civil parish had a population of 6,896 people in 3,053 households.

Census population of Coleshill parish
Census	Population	Female	Male	Households	Source
2001	6,343	3,226	3,117	2,734	
2011	6,481	3,355	3,126	2,834	
2021	6,896	3,550	3,346	3,053	

== Landmarks ==
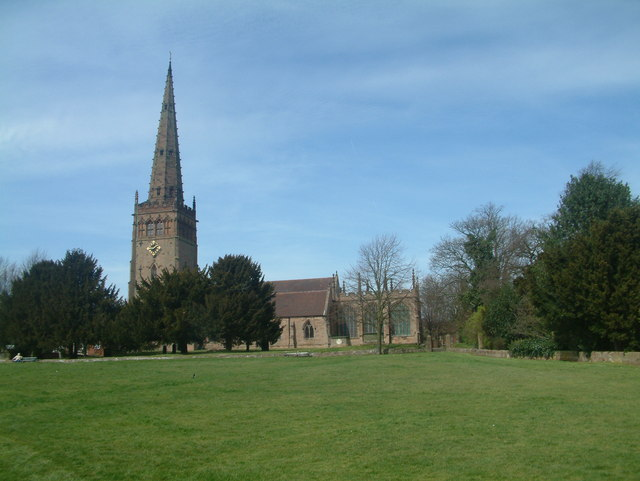
Church of St Peter and St Paul

Many former coaching inns remain in Coleshill, mostly along the High Street and Coventry Road. One of the most notable buildings in the town is the parish's Church of St Peter and St Paul at the top of the Market Square. It has a 52-metre (170 ft) high steeple, one of the finest in Warwickshire, dating from the 13th century. Inside there is a 12th-century font of Norman origin, which is one of the finest examples in the country. There are also medieval table tombs with effigies of knights, including John de Clinton. Just outside the south door are the preserved remains of a medieval cross.

The town's pillory and whipping post on Church Hill were last used in 1863. A bronze sculpture by Peter Walker in the High Street shows three themes of the town's origins: a stagecoach wheel, a visiting circus elephant and the creation of the Typhoo Tea brand by John Sumner.

== Transport ==
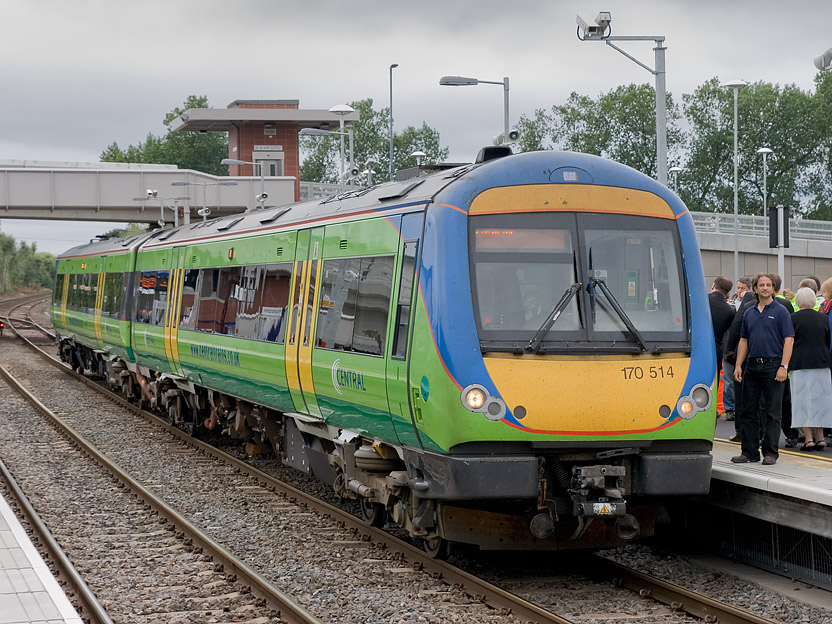
170514 stands at Coleshill Parkway

The town is close to the M6, M6 Toll and M42 motorways. It is on Junction 4 of the M6, with Birmingham City Centre at Junction 6, Sutton Coldfield J5, Nuneaton, Bedworth and Coventry North at J3 and Coventry East at Junction 2. The town is connected to East Birmingham by the B4114 Road which subsequently creates a road connection into Birmingham City Centre.

There is also a route to Coventry via the A446, which becomes the A452 just before the A45 road junction at Stonebridge. Upon reaching the western edge of Coventry, it is necessary to follow the A4114 road which now takes you to the city centre ring road A4053 after the A45 was diverted to run south of Coventry acting as a bypass.

Two regular bus routes serve the town. The X13 passes through Coleshill between Birmingham and Chelmsley Wood operated by National Express West Midlands. The 76 passes through between Tamworth and Sutton Coldfield operated by Diamond Bus.

Coleshill Parkway railway station opened in 2007 on the site of the previous Coleshill station, which had closed in 1968. It is on the Birmingham to Peterborough Line and is served half hourly by CrossCountry as part of their service between Birmingham New Street, Nuneaton, Leicester, Peterborough, Cambridge and Stansted Airport. Historically the town was also served by Maxstoke railway station on the Stonebridge Railway which closed in 1917 and Coleshill railway station, originally named Forge Mills, which closed in 1968. As a result, until 2007, the town's nearest railway station was Water Orton, some 2.5 miles (4 km) to the north-west.

== Media ==
Local news and television programmes are provided by BBC West Midlands and ITV Central. Television signals are received from the nearby Sutton Coldfield TV transmitter. The town is served by both BBC Radio WM on 95.6 FM and BBC CWR on 94.8 FM. Other radio stations received in the town are Heart West Midlands on 100.7 FM, Smooth West Midlands on 105.7 FM, Capital Mid-Counties on 96.2 FM, Greatest Hits Radio Birmingham & The West Midlands on 105.2 FM, and Hits Radio Coventry & Warwickshire on 97.0 FM. The town is served by local newspapers, Leamington Courier and Warwick Courier.

== Twin towns ==
Coleshill has been twinned with Chassieu near Lyon in France since 1983.

== Education ==
- The Coleshill School
- Coleshill Church of England Primary School
- St Edwards Roman Catholic Primary School
- High Meadow Community School Primary School
- Woodland Special School

== Notable people ==
- George Lloyd (1820–1885), a curate and archaeologist
- Henry Plumb, Baron Plumb, farmer and politician (1925 –2022)
- John Wynne (1819–1893), cricketer
- John Sumner (1856–1934), tea merchant
