= James Johnson (surgeon) =

British writer on diseases of tropical climates

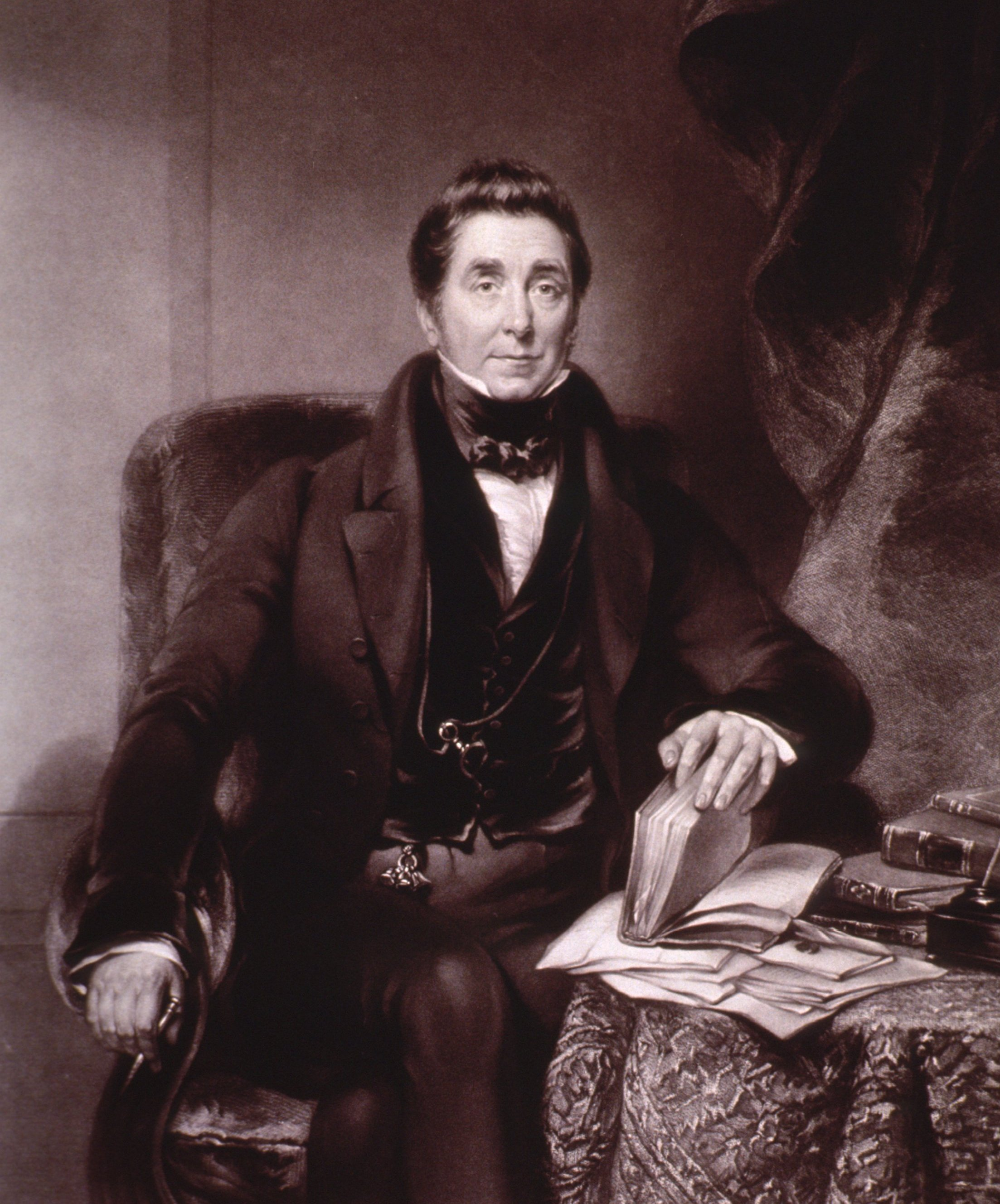
James Johnson

James Johnson (also Johnston; February 1777 – 10 October 1845) was an influential British writer on diseases of tropical climates in the first half of the nineteenth century. Born in Ireland, at the early age of 15 he became an apprentice to a surgeon-apothecary in County Antrim for two years. After spending two further years in Belfast, he moved to London for the surgeon's examination, which he passed in 1798. Immediately afterwards, he was appointed surgeon's mate on a naval vessel, on which he sailed to Newfoundland and Nova Scotia. In 1800 he took part in an expedition to Egypt and, in 1803, sailed for India.

In 1814, Johnson attended the Duke of Clarence (afterward William IV of the United Kingdom), and when Clarence became king was appointed as his physician extraordinary. He developed from that point careers as a physician and medical writer.

== Early life ==
Johnson was born at Ballinderry, County Londonderry in February 1777, in a Scots-Irish family, at a small farm on which his father lived. He lost his parents early, received a scanty education at the parish school, and at the age of 15 was apprenticed to a surgeon-apothecary at Portglenone, County Antrim. Here he stayed two years; he passed two more at Belfast, and then moved to London, where he arrived without money or friends, to finish his medical education. While supporting himself as an apothecary's assistant Johnson passed an examination at Surgeons' Hall in 1798.

== Naval surgeon ==
Johnson was appointed surgeon's mate in the navy, and sailed to Newfoundland and Nova Scotia, visiting the naval hospitals whenever his ship was in harbour. In January 1800 he passed his second examination, and in February he was made full surgeon and was appointed to the sloop-of-war HMS Cynthia. He accompanied the expedition against the French forces in Egypt, but was forced to return to London invalided. He spent the winter in studying anatomy at the theatre in Great Windmill Street School of Anatomy, and in June 1801 obtained an appointment on the sloop-of-war HMS Driver, and served in the North Sea.

At the Peace of Amiens of 1802, Johnson was again out of work for a time; but in the following year (May) sailed for the East, and did not return to England till January 1806. In 1808 he was appointed to HMS Valiant of 74 guns, in which he remained nearly five years, and saw active service. He attended the disastrous expedition to Walcheren in 1809, and was there attacked with ague.

At the peace of 1814, Johnson served in HMS Impregnable, when the Duke of Clarence conveyed the Emperor of Russia and the King of Prussia to the United Kingdom. He attended the Duke for a slight attack of fever, was appointed his surgeon in ordinary, was on good terms with him, and, after the Duke's accession to the throne in 1830, became physician extraordinary.

== Peacetime physician ==
In 1814 Johnson was placed on half-pay, and settled in general practice at Portsmouth. He is said to have graduated M.D. at the University of Aberdeen in 1813; but on 3 June 1821 he proceeded M.D. at St. Andrews; and on 25 June of the same year he was admitted a licentiate of the London College of Physicians.

== The Medico-Chirurgical Review ==
In Portsmouth Johnson founded in 1816 the Medico-Chirurgical Review, originally run with Drs. Shirley Palmer and William Shearman (and at first called the Medico-Chirurgical Journal), in monthly numbers. In 1818 Johnson moved to London, and ran the Review as a quarterly, his own publication. The content was almost all written by Johnson himself. The work sold well, and was for several years reprinted in America.

In January 1836 Sir John Forbes began the publication of his British and Foreign Medical Review, which diminished to some extent the circulation of Johnson's periodical. Johnson in later volumes co-edited with his son, Henry James Johnson. He retired from the editorship in October 1844. The last "new series" (6 vols., 1845–7) was mainly edited by Gavin Milroy, though his name did not appear on the title-page. An index to vols. i–xx. was published in 1834. In 1848 Johnson's and Forbes's rival reviews were amalgamated as British and Foreign Medico-Chirurgical Review, which was published from 1848 to 1877.

== Later life ==
Johnson's practice in London gradually grew, but his health showed early signs of failure. He died while on a visit to Brighton on 10 October 1845, and was buried at Kensal Green.

== Works ==
Johnson published an account of his Asian voyage with the title The Oriental Voyager, or Descriptive Sketches and Cursory Remarks on a Voyage to India and China in His Majesty's ship Caroline, performed in the years 1803–4–5–6, 1807. In 1812 he published The Influence of Tropical Climates on European Constitutions, as the result of his own observations in the East. It reached a sixth edition in 1841, under the supervision of James Ranald Martin, who made additions.

Johnson also wrote:

- The Influence of the Atmosphere on the Health of the Human Frame, with researches on Gout and Rheumatism, London, 1818.
- Practical Researches on the Nature, Cure, and Prevention of Gout, with a critical Examination of some celebrated Remedies and Modes of Treatment, London, 1819.
- Treatise on Derangements of the Liver, Internal Organs, and Nervous System, 3rd edit., London, 1820.
- Essay on Morbid Sensibility of the Stomach and Bowels as the proximate Cause or characteristic Condition of Indigestion, Nervous Irritability, 4th edit., London, 1827.
- Change of air, or, The philosophy of travelling, 1831.
- The Economy of Health, or the Stream of Human Life from ti Cradle to the Grave; with Reflections on the Septennial Phases of Human Existence, London, S. Highley, 32 Fleet Street 1836.
- Pilgrimages to the Spas in pursuit of Health and Recreation, with Inquiry into the merits of different Mineral Waters, London, 1841.
- Excursions to the principal Mineral Waters of England, London, 1843.
- Tour in Ireland, with Meditations and Reflections, London, 1844.

== Family ==
In the autumn of 1806 Johnson married Miss Charlotte Wolfenden of Lambeg, County Antrim, who survived him. They had six children.
