= Church of St Peter and St Paul, Coleshill =

- Coleshill Parish Church
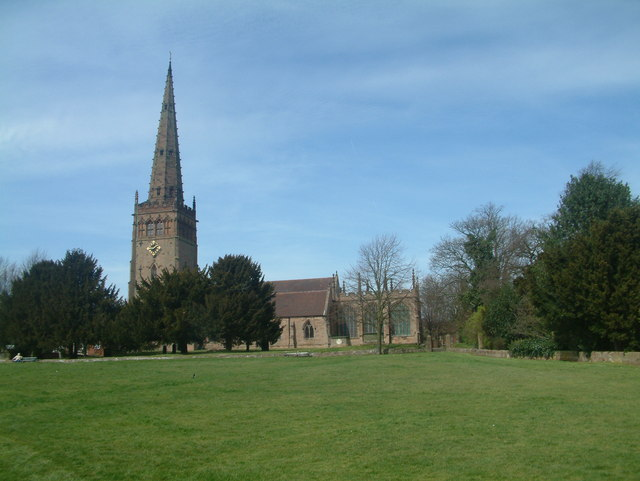
- Church of St Peter and St Paul, Coleshill
- 52°29′57.4″N 1°42′18.6″W
- OS grid reference: SP 20120 89059
- Location: Coleshill, Warwickshire
- Country: England
- Denomination: Church of England
- Previous denomination: Roman Catholic
- Churchmanship: Low Church
- Website: coleshillparishchurch.org.uk

History
- Dedication: Saint Peter and Saint Paul

Architecture
- Architectural type: Decorated Gothic
- Completed: 14th - 15th century

Specifications
- Height: 52 m (171 ft)

Administration
- Province: Canterbury
- Diocese: Birmingham
- Archdeaconry: Aston
- Deanery: Coleshill
- Parish: Coleshill Parish

Listed Building – Grade I
- Official name: Church of St Peter and St Paul
- Designated: 8 September 1961
- Reference no.: 1034697

The Church of St. Peter and St. Paul, often referred to as Coleshill Parish Church, is the Anglican parish church of Coleshill, Warwickshire, England. It has been a Grade I listed building since 1961, and was built between the 14th and 15th centuries, with the current spire built in the 1860s.

== History ==
The oldest part of the church dates back to the 14th century, but most of the church was built in the 15th century. There is evidence of a church at the site before this with a Norman font in the church. There is record of a priest here as far back as 1086. Norman foundations were found here during excavations but it is not known when the first church was built at this site. Due to the wooded area that used to surround Coleshill, it is thought that before the current church began construction there must have been a church made from timber, almost certainly on the site of the current church.

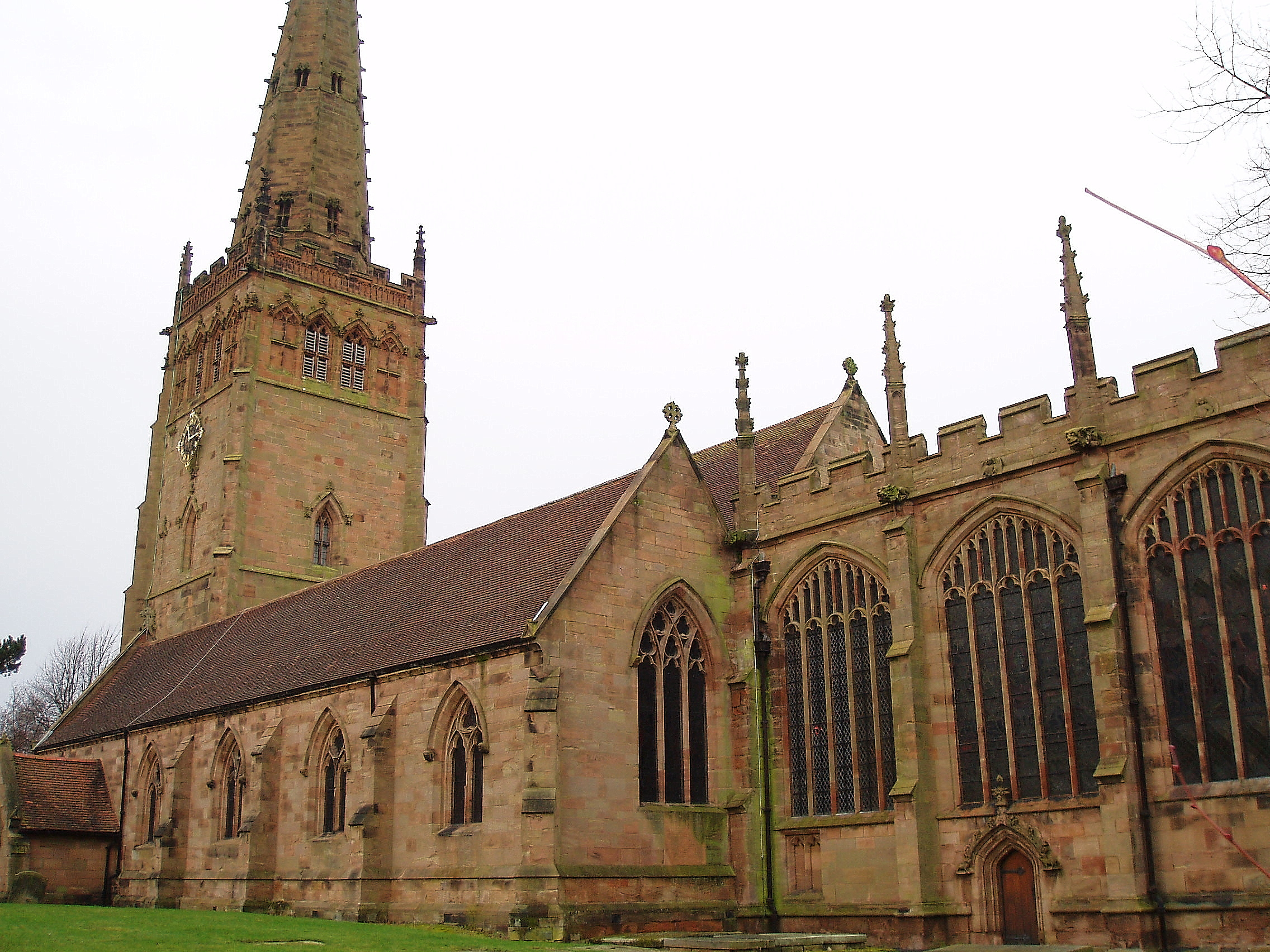

The spire was rebuilt in the 15th century. During extensive renovations of the church in the 1860s, including replastering of most of the building and replacing the roof with tiles, the spire was rebuilt again.

In 1961, a large number of buildings in the United Kingdom were listed. The church was included in this and on 8 September 1961 the Church of St. Peter and St. Paul gained the Grade I Listed status, the highest level possible.

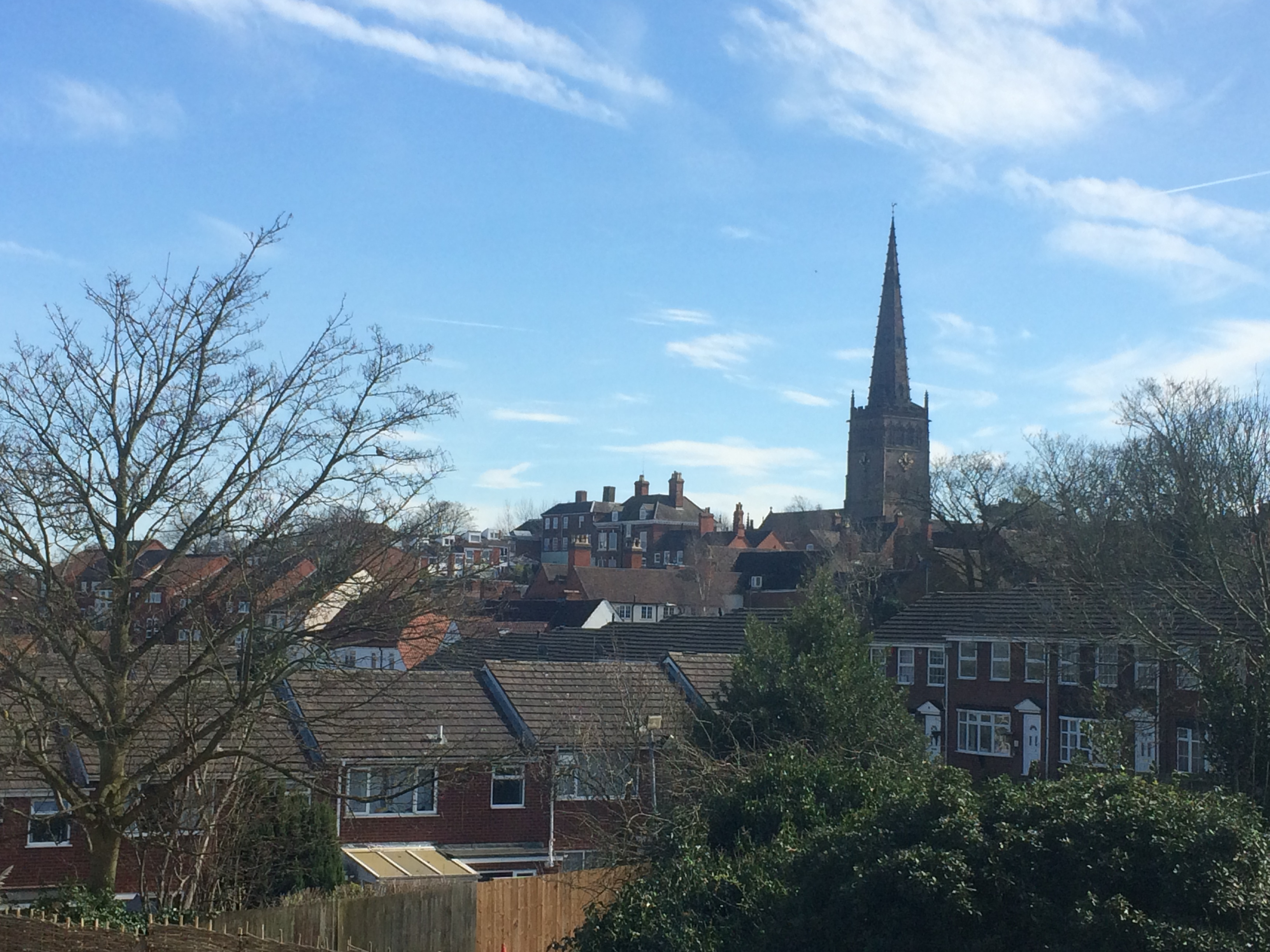
The church towers over Coleshill and can be seen from as far away as Chelmsley Wood
