= Glengettie =

Welsh brand of tea

Glengettie is a blend of tea aimed at Welsh consumers. It was first marketed in 1952.

== History ==
Glengettie is supplied in bags and also loose, in brown cartons, with English and Welsh text on opposite sides. The brand's website describes the tea as "an everyday black tea blend made up of Kenyan and Assam teas. The Kenyan teas give distinct flavour and rich colour, and the Assam teas give the blend a good, brisk strength" and claims that it "has been specially designed to complement the region’s soft water".

In November 2016 the brand launched a series of radio adverts featuring actor Di Botcher who plays Aunty Brenda in the television comedy drama Stella, which is set in South Wales. The Glengettie brand is owned by Typhoo Tea Limited, which until 2021 was part of by the Apeejay Surrendra Group, an Indian conglomerate.

In 2021 Glengettie's parent company Typhoo was acquired by British private-equity firm Zetland Capital. In March 2023 Typhoo announced it was closing its Moreton factory on the Wirral and outsourcing production of all its tea brands including Glengettie.
