= Royal Waterloo Hospital for Children and Women =

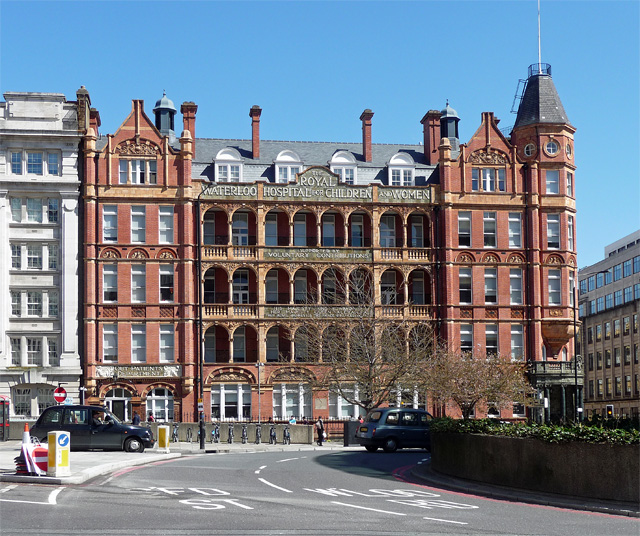
- Royal Waterloo Hospital for Children and Women

- Location within Lambeth

Geography
- Location: Waterloo Road, London, England
- Coordinates: 51.5052°N 0.1132°W

Organisation
- Care system: Joined NHS in 1948
- Affiliated university: Guy's and St Thomas' NHS Foundation Trust

Services
- Emergency department: No
- Beds: c.200 in 1903

History
- Founded: 1816 as Universal Dispensary for Children
- Closed: 27 July 1976

Links
- Lists: Hospitals in England

The Royal Waterloo Hospital for Children and Women was a hospital located on the corner of Waterloo Bridge Road and Stamford Street near Waterloo station in London, England. The current building was designed by noted ecclesiastical architect Sir Charles Nicholson at a cost of £45,000 and included an outpatients' department and inpatient accommodation of 90 beds. The hospital closed in 1981 and is now a dormitory building for the London branch of the University of Notre Dame.

== History ==
The hospital was founded by Dr John Bunnell Davis in 1816 as the Universal Dispensary for Children. In this first incarnation the hospital was located at St Andrew's Hill, in the now demolished Doctors' Commons in the City of London. The name of the hospital was changed to the Royal Universal Dispensary for Children in 1821. A new building, designed by David Laing, was built near Waterloo Bridge in 1823, and, after a foundation stone was laid by the Duke of York, the hospital moved into the new premises in 1824.

It became the Royal Universal Infirmary for Children in 1824, the Royal Infirmary for Children in 1843 and the Royal Infirmary for Children and Women in 1852. In an 1856 review of the hospital system in London, the British Journal of Homoeopathy noted the serious shortage of hospital beds for children in London:

Again, London possesses but one hospital (Hospital for Sick Children, Great Ormond Street), where sick children are received, containing the insignificant number of 30 beds. Paris has a large hospital (Enfants Malades), containing 600 beds for sick children. The Royal Infirmary for Children, Waterloo Bridge Road, is said to be capable, with a few alterations, of containing 80 beds; but we have no reason to suppose that it does yet contain any; and as its funds are stated to be very limited, there seems small hopes of its taking in sick children for the present.

The hospital underwent a further name change to the Royal Hospital for Children and Women in 1875. The new hospital was opened by Princess Louise in 1877, with one ward renamed the Louise Ward in her honour.

By 1903 concerns over bed space remained: an article in the British Medical Journal raised the concern that the Waterloo site left little room for extension. In 1903 a foundation stone for a new hospital was laid by Helen Duchess of Albany who had promoted fundraising efforts. Between 1903 and 1905, to the designs of Sir Charles Nicholson, the current premises was built at a cost of £45,000 to house an outpatients' department and inpatient accommodation of 90 beds at the corner of Waterloo Bridge Road and Stamford Street near Waterloo station. It became the Royal Waterloo Hospital for Children and Women at that time. In 1908 the Princess of Wales opened the Duchess of Albany Ward in honour of the Duchess's support. The ward was decorated with Doulton picture tiles depicting nursery rhymes and fairy tales; Greene (1987) wrote that after the hospital closed the tiles were re-sited in the St Thomas's Hospital collection.

The hospital joined the National Health Service in 1948 as part of the nearby St Thomas' Hospital group of hospitals (now Guy's and St Thomas' NHS Foundation Trust). The Royal Waterloo Hospital closed on 27 July 1976. The building was awarded Grade II listed status by English Heritage on 15 May 1980. It was sold the following year, and for the next three decades was the central London campus of Schiller International University. In 2011, Schiller International University moved out of the building and sold it to University of Notre Dame of Notre Dame, Indiana, USA where it was renovated and converted into dormitories.

== Notable staff ==
- Walter Cooper Dendy, surgeon and writer
- Charles Hilton Fagge, physician and author of medical papers
- John Cooper Forster, surgeon and author of medical papers
- Dr Braxton Hicks, who described Braxton Hicks contractions
- William Sargant, controversial psychiatrist
- William Shearman, physician and medical writer
- Charles West, physician, founder of Great Ormond Street Hospital
- Sir Samuel Wilks, physician, medical writer, biographer

== See also ==
- Healthcare in London
- Guy's and St Thomas' NHS Foundation Trust
- St Thomas' Hospital
