= Ernest Gold (meteorologist) =

British meteorologist

- Born: 24 July 1881; Berkswell (United Kingdom)
- Died: 30 January 1976; Hendon (United Kingdom)
- Occupation: Meteorologist
- Awards: Officer of the Order of the British Empire (1919); Companion of the Order of the Bath (1942); Distinguished Service Order (1916); International Meteorological Organization Prize (1958); Symons Gold Medal (1926)

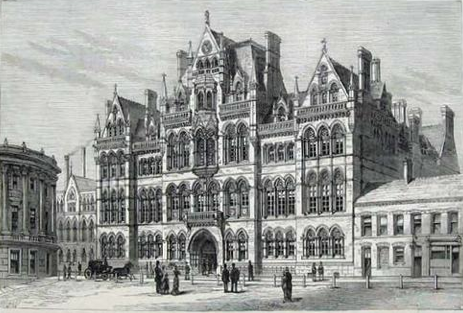
Mason University College, now the University of Birmingham

Ernest Gold (24 July 1881 – 30 January 1976) was a British meteorologist and Lieutenant-Colonel.

== Family and education ==
Ernest Gold was born at Berkswell, near Coventry, Warwickshire, in 1881. His parents were John Gold, a tenant farmer, and Ellen Gold née Peckett.

He was educated at The Coleshill School and Mason University College (which became the University of Birmingham). Gold then attended St John's College, Cambridge. He was awarded First Class Honours in the Cambridge Natural Sciences Tripos in 1903, graduating as Third Wrangler.

== Early career ==
In June 1906, Gold was employed for a year at the Meteorological Office as Superintendent of Instruments. From 1907 to 1910 he was appointed the Schuster Reader in Dynamical Meteorology at the University of Cambridge. During this time he focused his research on radioactive equilibrium in the stratosphere and produced the first scientific explanation for isothermal conditions. In 1910 he returned to work at the Meteorological Office as Superintendent of Statistics (climatology).

== World War I ==
Gold set up the first operational military meteorological service in France, known as The Meteorological Field Service or Meteor Royal Engineers, for the British Armed Forces in the summer of 1915 during World War I. Gold provided critical weather forecasting information and research for the war effort, such as monitoring changes in rainfall and the impact on ground conditions to support strategic decisions. He also proved that for accurate artillery fire against the enemy wind conditions needed to be taken into consideration. This demonstrated the vital role of meteorologists to the military hierarchy and by the end of the war Gold's staff team had expanded from three to 120 personnel.

Gold was mentioned in dispatches from the Commander in Chief of the British Expeditionary Force (BEF), was awarded the Distinguished Service Order and Order of the British Empire, and rose from his temporary commission to the rank of Lieutenant Colonel. He also oversaw the initial development of international aviation services.

== Post war career ==
After World War I, Gold was elected Fellow of the Royal Society in 1918. Gold became Assistant Director of the Meteorological Office. In 1920 he was elected president of the International Meteorological Organization (IMO, now the World Meteorological Organization)'s Commission for Synoptic Weather Information, dealing with questions of synoptic meteorology. He worked in this position for 28 years.

He was elected President of the Royal Meteorological Society for 1934–35.

Gold retired in 1947.

== Personal life and death ==
Gold married Catherine Lockerbie Harlow on 4 July 1907. They had met through the Cambridge Nonconformist Union and had one daughter. He enjoyed playing golf, playing bridge and gardening.

He died at Hendon, London, in 1976 at the age of 94.

== Honours and awards ==
- 1912 Awarded first prize for his dissertation on international balloon and kite ascents in an essay competition organized by the German Meteorological Institution
- 1918 Elected Fellow of the Royal Society
- 1918 OBE
- 1926 Symons Gold Medal
- 1942 CB
- 1958 International Meteorological Organization Prize of the World Meteorological Organization.

Gold is also credited as the original proposal for the term "thermal wind."
