= Grimstock Hill Romano-British settlement =

Romano-British settlement site in Warwickshire

Coordinates: 52.512°N 1.714°W

Grimstock Hill, located north of the River Cole in Coleshill, Warwickshire, was the site of a Romano-British settlement discovered in 1978. The site included a temple complex with evidence of a circular wooden Iron Age temple, later replaced by a stone-built temples of the Roman period, developed in two phases. A settlement extending at least 450 metres (1,480 ft) was excavated to the south, with evidence including a bathhouse, ovens, ditches and walls.
