= John Cooper Forster =

British surgeon (1823–1886)

John Cooper Forster (13 November 1823 – 2 March 1886) was a British surgeon.

== Biography ==
Forster was born in 1823 in Lambeth, London, where his father and grandfather before him had been local medical practitioners. He entered Guy's Hospital in 1841, was appointed demonstrator of anatomy in 1850, assistant-surgeon in 1855, and surgeon in 1870. He became a member of the College of Surgeons in 1844, fellow in 1849 and president in 1884.

He was a prompt and sometimes bold operator. In 1858, he performed practically the first gastrostomy in England for a case of cancer of the oesophagus. Among his best-known papers were discussions of acupressure, syphilis, hydrophobia, intestinal obstruction, modified obturator hernia, torsion, and colloid cancer of the large intestine; and he published a book on Surgical Diseases of Children in 1860, founded on his experience as surgeon to the hospital for children and women in Waterloo Road. He died suddenly in London on 2 March 1886.
