= John Sumner (tea merchant) =

British tea merchant (1856–1934)

Sir John Sumner
- Born: 25 February 1856; Birmingham, England
- Died: 11 May 1934 (aged 78); Birmingham, England
- Known for: Tea merchant who founded Typhoo Tipps

Sir John Sumner (25 February 1856 – 11 May 1934) was an English tea merchant who founded the "Typhoo Tipps" tea brand.

Born the elder son of John Sumner, a Birmingham grocer, druggist and chemist, Sumner shared with his brother the business, taking over the grocery side in the 1890s. In 1903, Sumner began to sell the previously discarded fannings (tips) of tea leaves in packets, marketed as cures for indigestion and nervous disorders. This grew significantly, with the brand available from over 40,000 retail outlets in the 1930s, making Typhoo one of the most widely-sold packet teas in Britain.

Once his business was successful, Sumner focussed on philanthropy in Birmingham and the wider West Midlands, founding the John Sumner Trust in 1927 and the Colehaven Trust in 1930. Sumner was knighted in June 1932 as a reward for his charitable and political services, and died in 1934.
