= The Coleshill School =

Location
- Coventry Road; Coleshill, Warwickshire, B46 3EX; England; 52.4854°N 1.7043°W

Information
- Type: Academy
- Motto: 'Deo Non Fortuna' 'Through God, Not Chance'
- Religious affiliation: Church of England
- Established: 1520; 506 years ago
- Local authority: Warwickshire
- Department for Education URN: 136986 Tables
- Ofsted: Reports
- Chairman: Dewi Jones
- Head teacher: Rebecca Brindley
- Executive head: Neil Warner
- Gender: Mixed
- Age: 11 to 18
- Enrolment: 994
- Former name: Coleshill Grammar School
- Website: http://www.thecoleshillschool.org.uk

The Coleshill School is a school with academy status in Coleshill, Warwickshire, England, founded in 1520.

== Admissions ==
The school is a mixed secondary school of about 1,000 pupils. In September 2004, it obtained "Maths and Computing College" status, which has been incorporated in some variations of its name. This new status has enabled increased funding for the school in order to develop its mathematics and ICT facilities.

== History ==
The academy was formerly Coleshill Grammar School and has been located at its present site since 1956 when it relocated from Church Hill Coleshill. The school had been at the Church Hill site since the sixteenth century, and in that building since the eighteenth century.

== Sixth form ==
The Coleshill School operates a sixth form centre, where it recruits mainly from its Year 11 school leavers; but also from other local schools in the area. A-level, BTEC and T-level qualifications are offered.

In a 2006 Ofsted report, it was noted that "The effectiveness and efficiency of the sixth form are good with some outstanding features, such as the contribution the students make to the life of the school".

The education league tables of UK colleges indicates that sixth formers from The Coleshill School achieve, on average, fewer academic points than other schools both locally and nationally. In the Warwickshire area, The Coleshill School ranks 18th out of 26 schools with regard to A-level performance.

== Staffing and teaching ==
The 2006 Ofsted report indicates both positive and negative results with regards to teaching. Teaching is described as "satisfactory", with elaboration given as "There is a significant amount of good teaching, but a few lessons are unsatisfactory".

On 14 April 2009, it was announced that headteacher Kate Kearney would step down at the end of the 2009 spring term. The announcement came days after regulator Ofsted announced the decision to place the school in special measures.

In 2016 the Coleshill School was rated 'Good' by Ofsted and this rating was upheld in the most recent inspection on 3 and 4 March 2020. Strengths were listed as being high expectations of students, behaviour, management and extra-curricular opportunities.

== 2009 implementation of special measures ==
An Ofsted inspection in March 2009, reported that the school required special measures because it was failing to deliver an acceptable standard of education. There are four stated areas of improvement that Ofsted noted:

- Ensure all teachers maximise the achievement, learning and progress of all pupils in lessons and consistently provide high quality written feedback when assessing pupils' work.
- Ensure there is consistency and coherence in the way that assessment information is used throughout the school to set realistic but challenging targets.
- Monitor pupils' progress rigorously and systematically and make sure that individual pupils know exactly how well they are doing and what they need to do to improve their work in all subjects.
- Increase the rigour and accuracy of self-evaluation and improvement planning at all levels of leadership.

The full report is available from the Ofsted website.

On Friday 16 July 2010, it was announced through the school website that the school was out of special measures. The report is available from the school website.

In 2016, the school was rated 'good' by Ofsted. This rating was recently upheld in the most recent Ofsted inspection on the 3 and 4 March 2020.

== Extra-curricular activities ==
From 2004–2006, school visits were made to France, Spain, Poland, Italy and Namibia.

As well as these visits abroad, the school also offers numerous trips and activities within the country. These include sports, choir, drama, dance, skiing trips, and residential visits.

== Academic performance ==
As of 2012, academic achievement at GCSE level was above the national average.

== Notable alumni ==
=== Coleshill Grammar School ===
- Charles George Bonner VC, DSC, Royal Navy
- Ernest Gold CB DSO OBE FRS, meteorologist
- Sally Jones (journalist), tennis player and television presenter
- Alan Merrick, footballer
- Cold War Steve, artist
- David Willey, American physicist
