= Charles West (physician) =

British physician

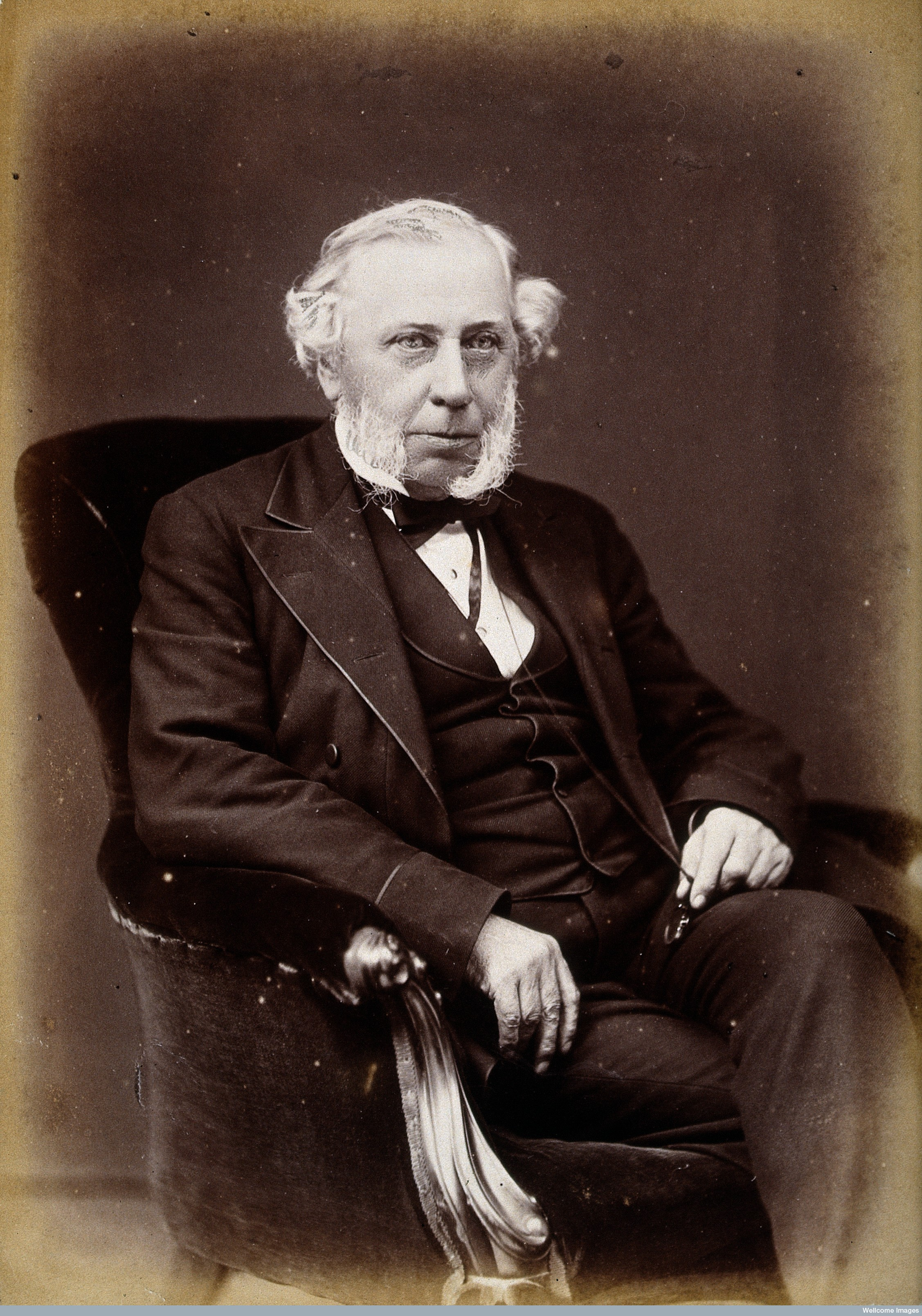
- Charles West
- Born: 8 August 1816; London, England
- Died: 19 March 1898 (aged 81); Paris, France
- Known for: Founder of Great Ormond Street Hospital
- Scientific career
- Fields: Medicine, pediatrics, obstetrics

Charles West (1816–1898) was a British physician, specialized in pediatrics and obstetrics, especially known as the founder of the first children's hospital in Great Britain, the Hospital for Sick Children in Great Ormond Street, London.

== Life ==
=== Early life and education ===
Charles West was born in London on 8 August 1816. His father was a Baptist lay preacher who in 1821 became a minister of a Baptist congregation in Buckinghamshire where he also ran a school for young boys. Charles received his first education in his father's school. When he was fifteen, Charles West became an apprentice to a Mr. Gray, a general practitioner of Amersham who had also been an apothecary in a hospital. West

“has left it on record that the two things, which he learnt while with Mr. Gray were to compound medicines - a knowledge which he afterwards found of great service when prescribing for children - and a familiar acquaintance with Shakespeare, which doubtless fostered, if it did not create, the literary taste afterwards so conspicuous in his writings".

In 1833, he entered as a medical student at St. Bartholomew's Hospital where he remained two years with good results and some awards. When, in 1835, the theological opinions of his father prevented him to transfer to Oxford University he decided to complete his medical education in Continental Europe. So, he went to study in Bonn, then in Paris and finally in Berlin where he earned his Medical Degree in September 1837. Then, between 1838 and 1839, he spent almost a year in Dublin working at the Rotunda Hospital and at the Meath Hospital, highly renowned at the time for the clinical glamour of Robert Graves and William Stokes.

=== Professional career ===
Back in London, West, after some years as a Clinical Clerk at St. Bartholomew's, in 1842 was appointed physician to the Universal Dispensary for Children in Waterloo Road, then lecturer in midwifery at the Middlesex Hospital in 1845 and later (1848–61) again lecturer in midwifery also at St. Bartholomew's Hospital. He became more and more involved in the medical problems of children and the first edition of his Lectures on the diseases of infancy and childhood (Longman 1848) was a great success and gave him sudden fame.

=== The Hospital for Sick Children ===
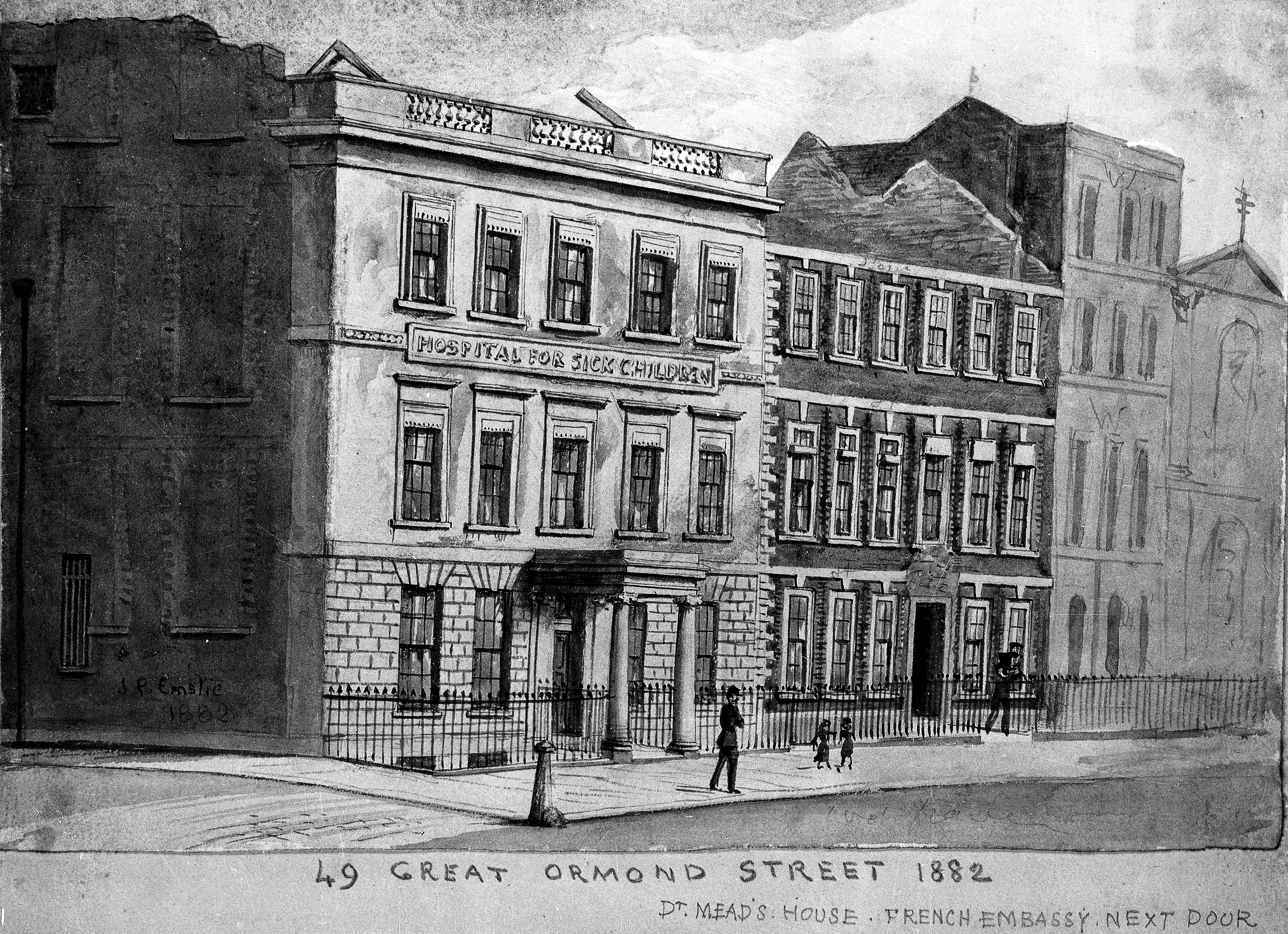
The Hospital for Sick Children in 1882

After some unfortunate attempts to transform the Waterloo Dispensary for children into a hospital, he decided to start a fundraising campaign in order to establish in London a hospital specifically for children. Also due to his remarkable oratorical gifts, West's campaign had success and, in the spring of 1851, a little hospital with ten beds was opened at 49 Great Ormond Street, in a house that had belonged to Richard Mead. In 1854, after three years of activity, Charles West - who was the first physician of the hospital - could describe the initial success of the structure. He also took advantage from this success to boost research funds in view of further enlargement:

"The Hospital for Sick Children was opened in 1851 in Great Ormond Street, Queen Square (…) was the first hospital for children ever established in this country. The poor now flock to it, sick children from all parts of London are brought to it. The out-patients in the first year were 1252, in the second 4251; during nine months only of the third year they already amount to between 5 and 6000; but still the want of funds limits the numbers who are received into it, and only thirty beds can be kept open for in-patients. Thirty beds! when more than 21,000 children die every year in this metropolis under ten years of age; and when this mortality falls thrice as heavily on the poor as on the rich! But alas, the tables of mortality do not tell the whole of the sad tale. It is not only because so many children die, that this Hospital was founded; but because so many are sick; because they languish in their homes; a burden to their parents who have no leisure to tend them, no means to minister to their wants. The one sick child weighs down the whole family; it keeps the father poor, the home wretched. (…) Do not then let this Hospital fail for want of funds. Visit it for yourselves: see what its daily working is, read the simple tale of good done which its Reports unfold; and then, if you feel for the poor, if you love little children, if you have children of your own, or have had, and lost them, or have had them given back to you when you feared that they would be taken from you for ever — let every motive which policy can suggest, which philanthropy can furnish, affection enforce, or religion sanctify, induce you to join with the Committee, and give them what best you can contribute, your time, your influence, or your money, to forward them in their work.

— Charles West

.

His tireless efforts established the hospital as one of the world's leading pediatric institutions.

=== Conversion to Catholicism and later life ===
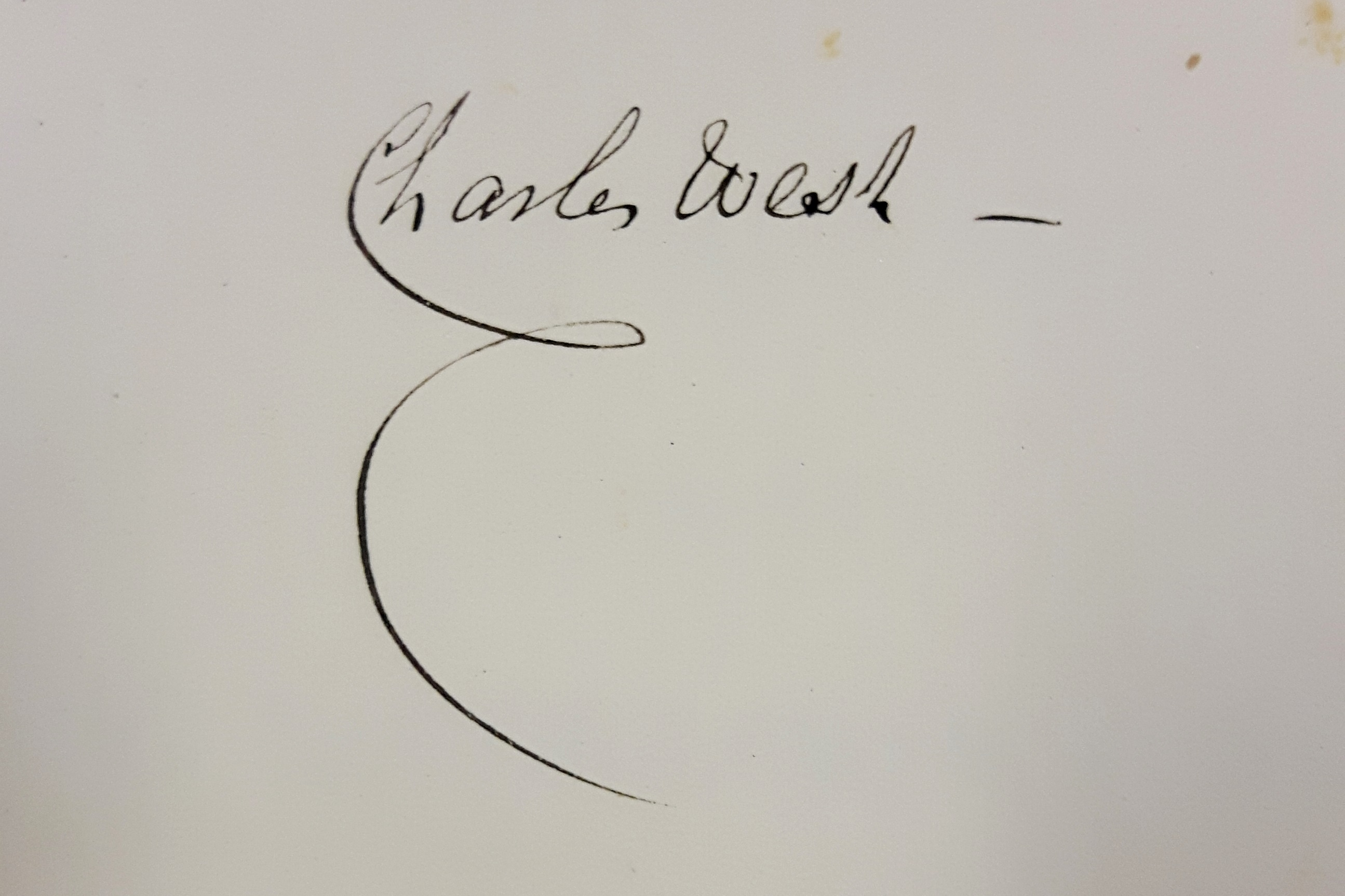
Charles West's signature

In 1877, following a disagreement with the hospital's management committee, West's collaboration with Great Ormond Street Hospital came to an end. West believed that the heart of the disagreement was his conversion to Catholicism which led the committee to think that he ‘could not be trusted for the future’. It must be added, however, that West, along with many qualities, had always had a difficult character, as he had already expressed, for example, in his years of collaboration with the St Bartholomew's Hospital. His self-defense, along with his Christian vision of a pediatrician's mission, was fully mentioned in the obituary published after his death in the British Medical Journal:

I trust that I need not say to you that neither in deed, word, nor thought has my conduct been swayed by my religious opinions. But I will further add that I have always thought and often said that I do not know the meaning of our Saviour's mission if every child under 12 years old, Christian, Jew, Mohammedan, or Pagan is not at once received on dying into the presence of Him who said 'Suffer little children to come unto me’.

— (Charles West)

.

From 1880, he became more and more uncomfortable with London's climate and decided to practice in Nice during the winters. In 1891 a bad attack of neuralgia began to affect his health, even if he continued to devote himself to the profession and to sick children until shortly before his death, occurred in Paris on 19 March 1898. His last days were remembered by a friend of him, Dr. R. L. Bowles:

During the last few years Dr. West complained much of a sense of muscular weakness and exhaustion, for the relief of which he sought constant change of air and scene, but with only partial success. During the whole of this time his intellectual and mental powers, he assured me, were as quick and active as they ever were, and he, was never so happy as when busily engaged writing or reading, or in dealing with matters of business. He could sit up the greater part of the night working in these ways without any sense of fatigue whatever. This winter he went to Nice as usual and enjoyed the early part of his stay, but later, not feeling well, he made his way homewards. In Paris he lost power in his lower extremities, and finally fell down when attempting to stand. After this he kept to his bed, but in a few days became gradually unconscious, and he died with continuous mucous stertor. He was buried at Chislehurst by his own request. The last few years of his life he suffered much from depression and from anxiety for the welfare of the Children's Hospital, a subject with which his mind was entirely occupied.

— (R.L.Bowles)

.

Charles West married twice. From his first marriage he had a son and a daughter. He was buried in the cemetery of Chislehurst in the London Borough of Bromley.

== Appointments and honours ==
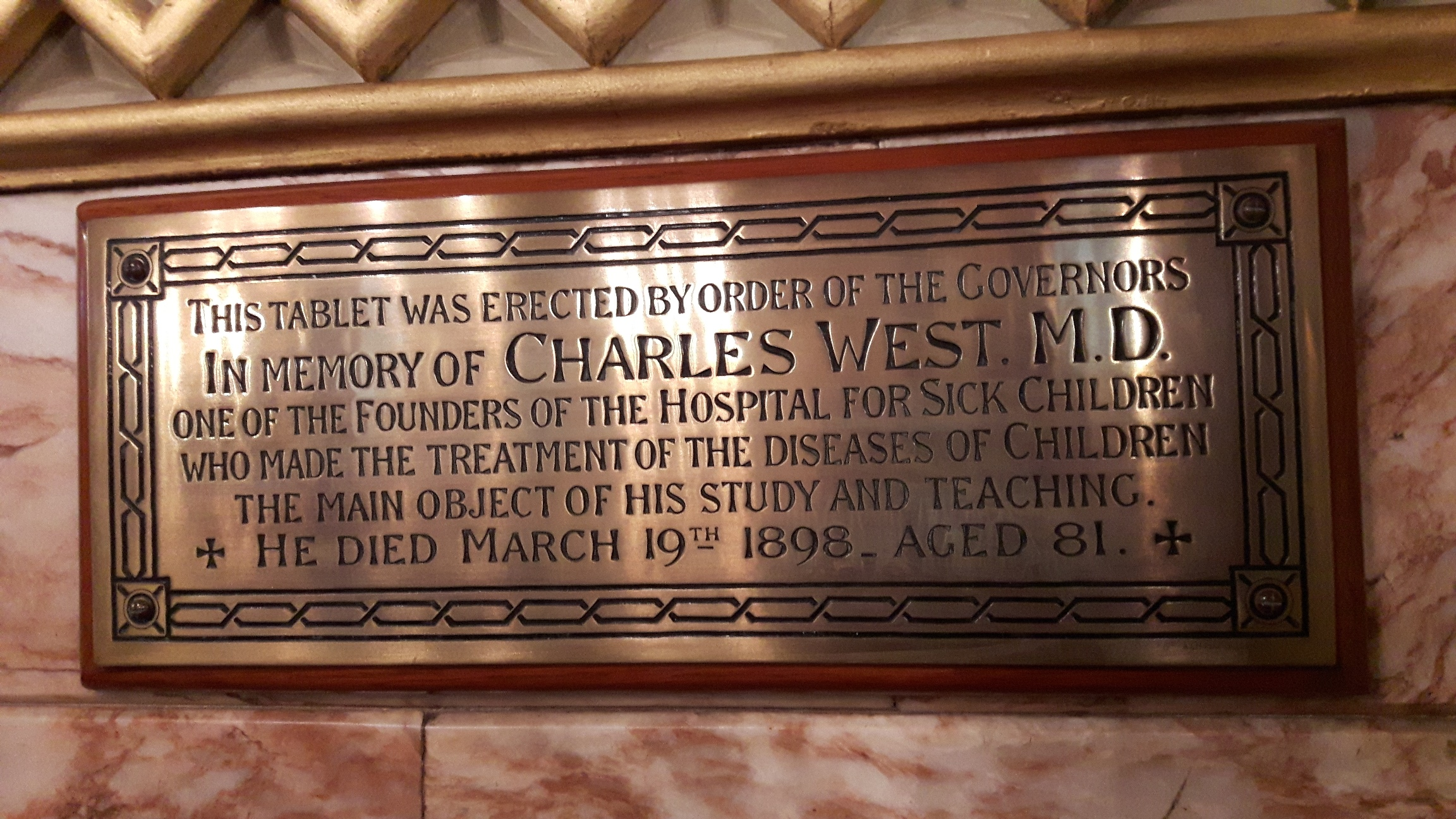
Charles West's memorial tablet, Chapel of St Christopher, Great Ormond Street Hospital, London

Charles West became a Member of the Royal College of Physicians in 1842, and a Fellow in 1848. In 1863 he became Censor, and in 1870 Senior Censor of the college. About the same time he was elected a Corresponding Member of the Paris Académie de Médecine. He was President of the Royal Medical and Chirurgical Society in the years 1877–78, and Examiner to the Universities of London and Cambridge, and to the College of Physicians.

== Some writings ==
- Lectures on the diseases of infancy and childhood, Longman, Brown, Green, & Longmans, London 1848, pp. XXIII-488 [subsequent Longmans' enlarged and revised editions in 1852, 1854, 1859, 1865, 1874 and 1884]
- The profession of medicine: its study, and practice its duties, and rewards: An address delivered at Saint Bartholomew's Hospital on the opening of the medical session of 1850-51, Longman, Brown, Green, and Longmans, London 1850, pp. 32 [new edition: Kegan Paul, Trench, Trübner, London 1896]
- How to nurse sick children; Intended especially as a help to the nurses at the Hospital for Sick Children, Longman & C., London 1854, pp. 79 [II ed., London 1860, pp. 95: Author's name was indicated only on this second edition]
- Lectures on the diseases of women, John Churchill, London 1856–1858, 2 volumes [subsequent Churchill's enlarged and revised editions in 1858, 1864 and 1879]
- On some disorders of the nervous system in childhood: being the Lumleian Lectures delivered at the Royal College of Physicians of London in March 1871, Longmans, Green, London 1871, pp. 136
- Harvey and his times. The Harveian Oration for 1874, Longmans, Green, London 1874, pp. 64
- On hospital organisation: with special reference to the organisation of hospitals for children, Macmillan, London 1877, pp. IX-97
- Address of Charles West, M.D., F.R.C.P., President of the Royal Medical and Chirurgical Society of London, at the Annual Meeting, March 1, 1879, Adlard, London 1879, pp. 24
- A letter to Lord Aberdare, chairman of the Managing Committee of the Hospital for Sick Children, Sotheran & Co., London 1887, pp. 32

== Bibliography ==
- Anonymous, Obituary: Charles West, M.D., F.R.C.P., Founder of and some time Physician to the Hospital for Sick Children, Great Ormond Street, London, British Medical Journal, 2 April 1898, vol. 1(1944), pp. 921-923
- F.S. Besser, "Notes on Dr. Charles West and his grave in Chislehurst (Kent)", Hist Med, 1975, vol. 6(3-4), pp. 47–50
- Luca Borghi, When human touch makes the difference. The legacy of Charles West (1816-1898), pediatrics pioneer, Medicina Historica, 2017, 1(1):13-8
- Luca Borghi, Anna Marchetti, Introducing the trained and educated gentlewoman into the wards of a children’s hospital. The role of Charles West, M.D. (1816-1898) in the rise of pediatric nursing, Medicina Historica, 2018, 2(2):63-74
- Peter M Dunn, Dr Charles West (1816-98) of London and the cold syndrome, Archives of Disease in Childhood, 1991; 66: 455-456
- Kevin Telfer, The remarkable story of Great Ormond Street Hospital, Simon & Schuster, London 2007, pp. 208
- John Walker-Smith, "Charles West", in W.F. Bynum and H. Bynum (eds.), Dictionary of Medical Biography, Greenwood Press, Westport-London 2007, vol. 5, pp. 1297–8
- Kutzsche, S; Nalliah, S (2024). "Charles West (1816–1898): Pioneering paediatrician and midwifery advocate in 19th century medicine". Acta Paediatrica. doi:10.1111/apa.17476. PMID 39450779. S2CID 273588116.
