= Typhoo =

Tea brand

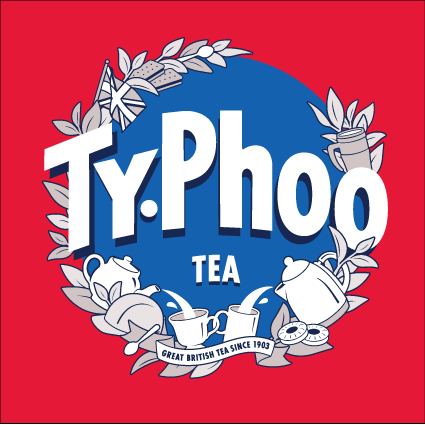

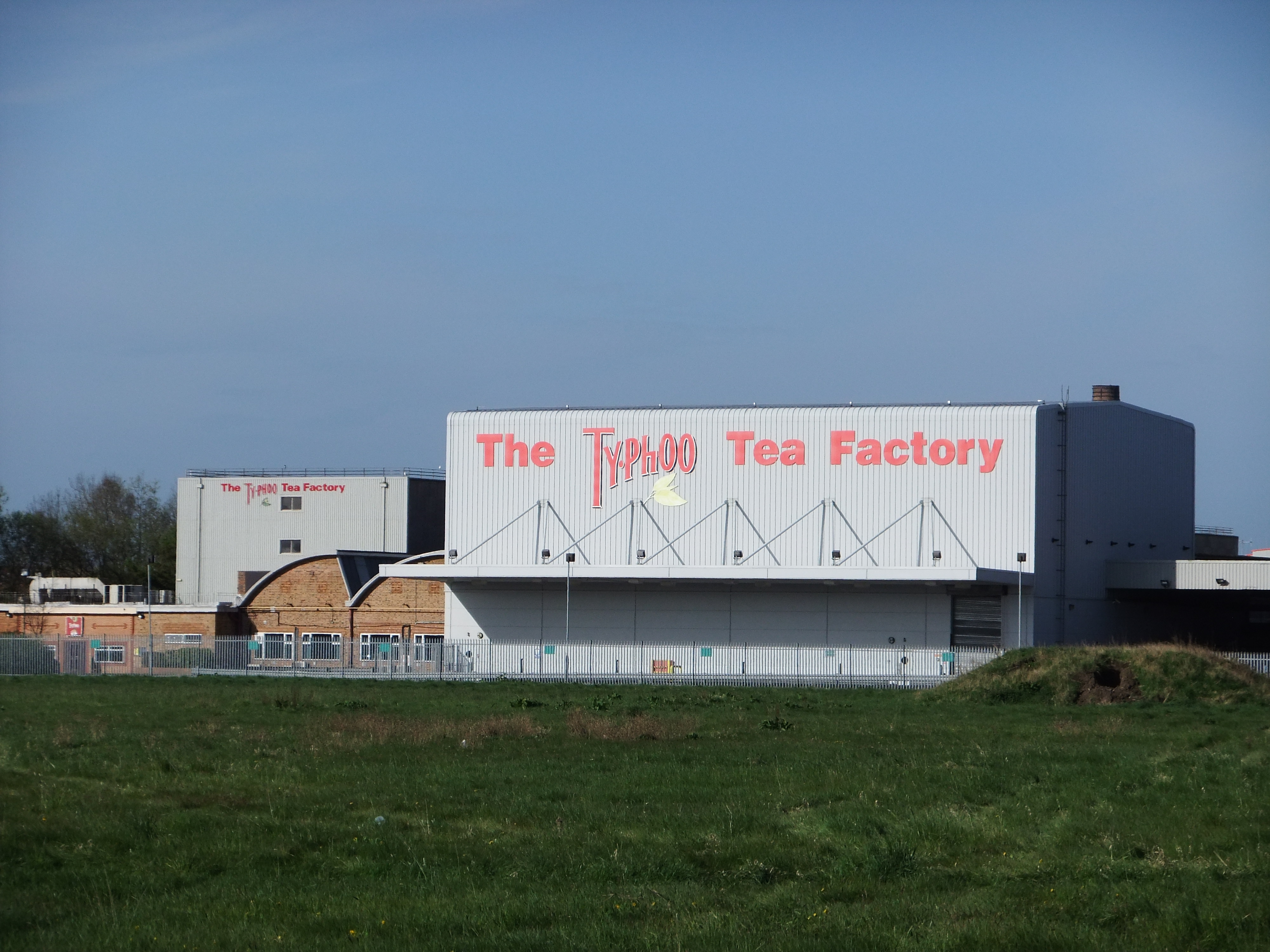
- Former Typhoo tea factory in Moreton, Merseyside
- Product type: Tea
- Current owner: Supreme Imports
- Produced by: Typhoo Tea Limited
- Country: United Kingdom
- Introduced: 1903
- Previous owners: Schweppes (1968); Cadbury Schweppes (1969–1986); Premier Brands (1986–1990); Premier Foods (1990–2005); Apeejay Surrendra Group (2005–2021); Zetland Capital (2021–2024); Supreme Imports (2024-)
- Website: typhoo.co.uk

Typhoo (sometimes stylized as Ty•Phoo) is a brand of tea in the United Kingdom. It was launched in 1903 by John Sumner Jr. of Birmingham, England. In 2022, the Typhoo brand was ranked 5 in sales volume in the UK in spite of being deemed to have the largest production output; this mismatch is due to major supermarkets' own-labelled tea brands being largely supplied by Typhoo.

== History ==
=== 19th century ===
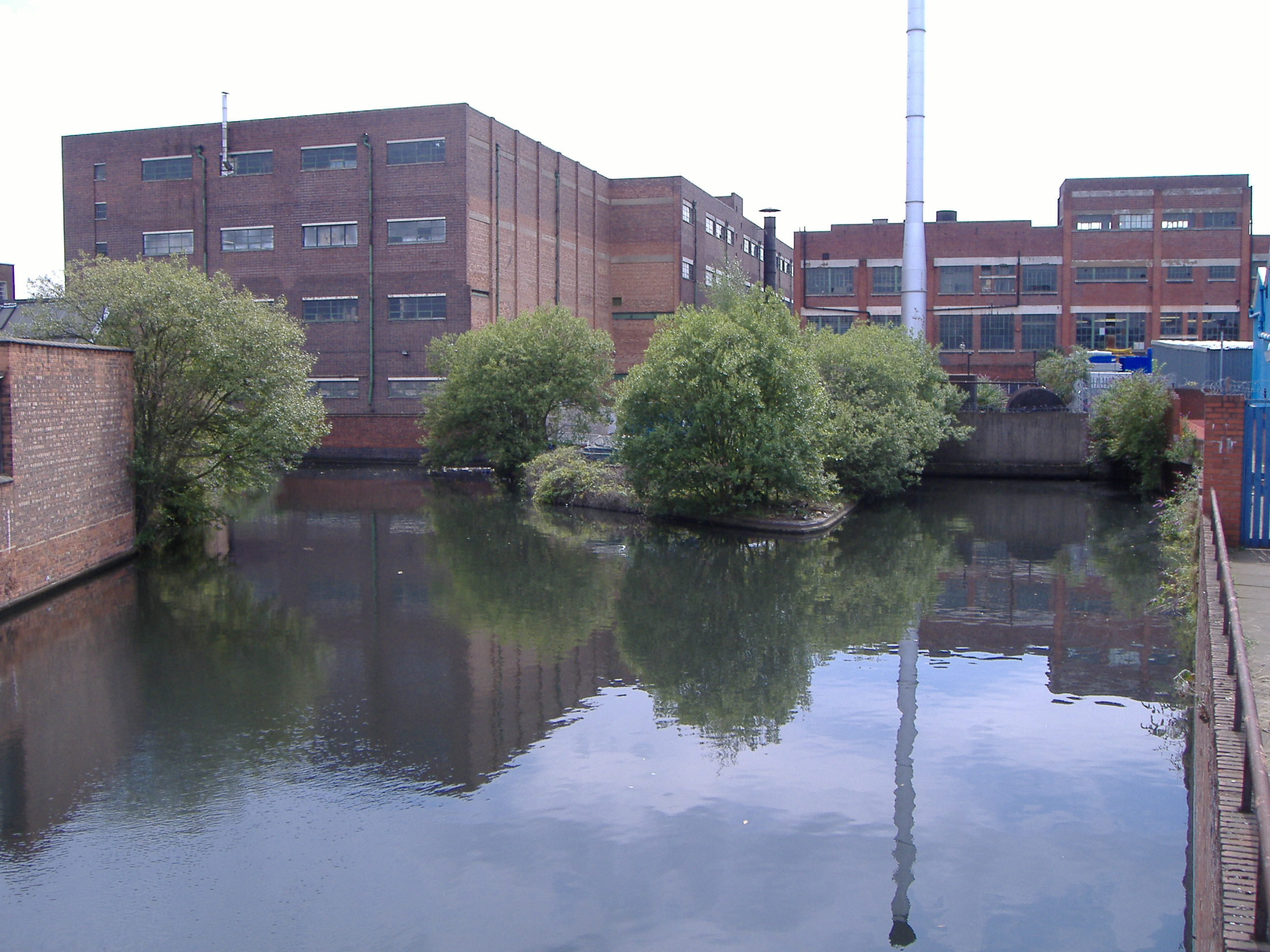
Former Typhoo tea factory and canal wharf in Digbeth, Birmingham

In 1863, William Sumner published A Popular Treatise on Tea as a by-product of the first trade missions to China from London. In 1870, William and his son John Sumner founded a pharmacy/grocery business in Birmingham.

=== 20th century ===
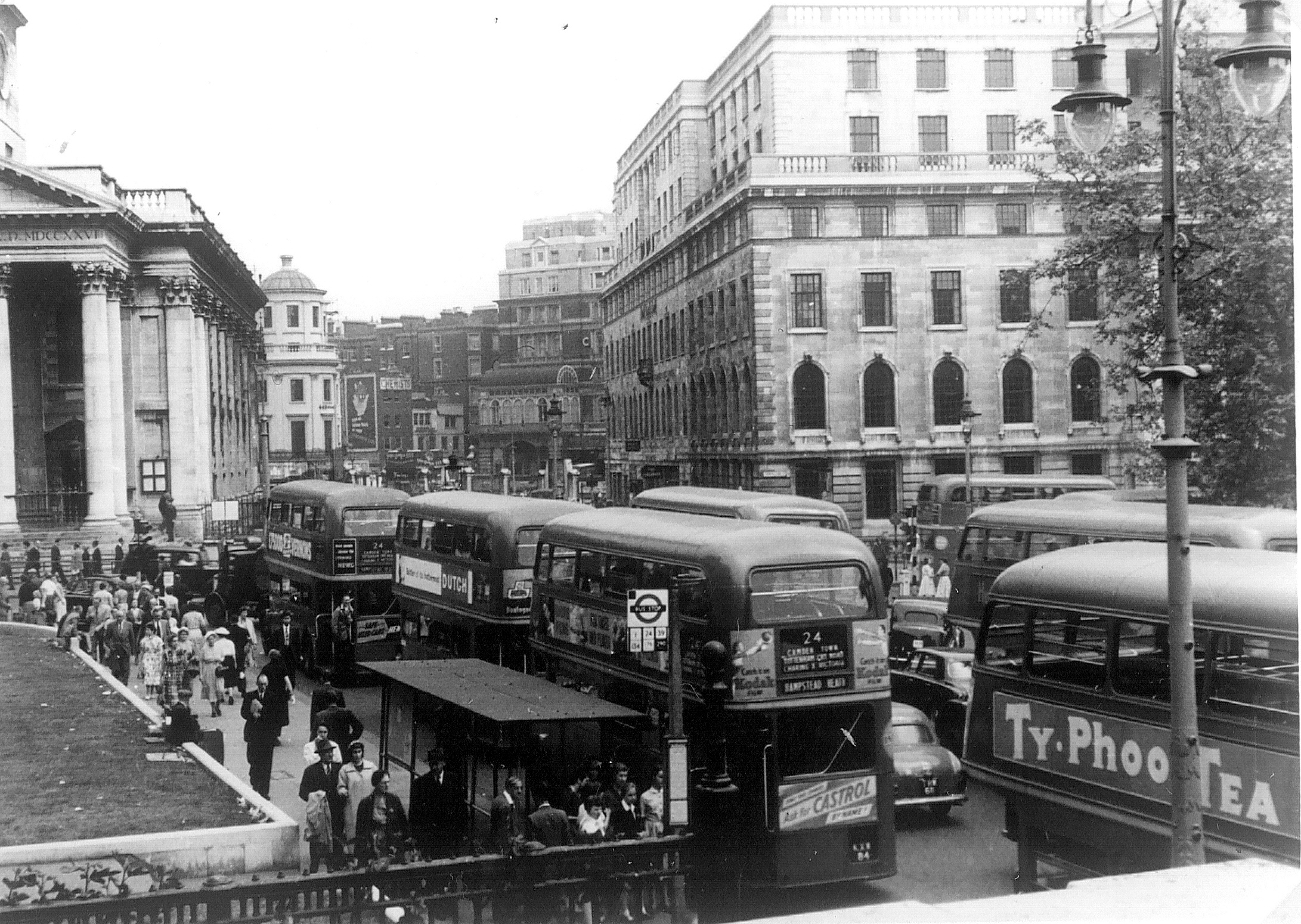
Ty•Phoo tea advertising on a bus at Trafalgar Square, 1957

William's grandson, John Sumner Jr. (born in 1856), took over the running of the business in the 1900s. Following comments from his sister on the calming effects of tea fannings, in 1903, John Jr. decided to create a new tea that he could sell in his shop. Sumner set his own criteria for the new brand:

- The name had to be distinctive and unlike others.
- It had to be a name that would trip off the tongue.
- It had to be one that would be protected by registration.

The selected name, Typhoo, comes from the Mandarin Chinese word for "doctor" (Chinese: 大夫; pinyin: dàifū).

Typhoo began making tea bags in 1967. In 1968, Typhoo merged with Schweppes. The following year this company in turn merged with Cadbury to form Cadbury Schweppes.

In 1978, production was moved from Birmingham to Moreton on the Wirral Peninsula, in Merseyside. The Moreton site was also the location of Burton's Foods and Manor Bakeries factories.

In 1986, in an effort to focus on their core brands, Cadbury Schweppes sold Typhoo, along with Kenco coffee and Jeyes Fluid. Typhoo was subject to management buy out forming a new company, Premier Brands, which acquired, in rapid succession, Melrose's, the Glengettie Tea Company, Ridgways (founded by Thomas Ridgway), and the Jersey Trading Corporation. In 1990, the company was itself acquired by Premier Foods, then trading as Hillsdown Holdings.

=== 21st century ===
In 2003, Typhoo was the third-best selling tea brand to consumers in Britain, measured by value. The largest was PG Tips Pyramid followed by Tetley.

In October 2005, the Indian company Apeejay Surrendra Group purchased the brands for £80 million from Premier Foods and created The Typhoo Tea Company. The brand continued to be manufactured at Moreton on the Wirral.

Record high material costs and adverse currency movements saw Typhoo Tea's profits plummet to a £20 million loss in the year ending 31 March 2018. The tea maker recognised the year as one of the most challenging trading periods for the business in recent history.

Early in 2020, Typhoo Tea proposed cutting about a quarter of posts at its headquarters to safeguard the future of the company. The restructuring, which is subject to the outcome of a consultation, would see 55 full-time and 21 temporary jobs closed at the firm's factory in Moreton, Wirral, a spokesman said. He said the plan came against "the backdrop of an increasingly challenging trading environment".

In 2020 Typhoo Tea reported mounting losses in a "watershed" year for the business, raising doubts about the brand’s ability to continue trading. They reported pre-tax losses of £29.9 million for the 12 months to March 2019, up from £20M the prior year. The accounts warned that an inability to refinance or extend its financing agreements "represents a material uncertainty which may cast significant doubt over the company’s ability to continue as a going concern". Furthermore, the accounts stated there remained a "high level of uncertainty" as to the impact of the coronavirus outbreak, despite reporting an upward trend in supermarket sales under lockdown. Typhoo blamed its poor performance on the decision to continue to pursue an "aggressive" sales growth strategy focused on boosting its own-label business.

In 2021, Typhoo was acquired by British private-equity firm Zetland Capital.

In March 2023, Typhoo announced it was closing its Moreton factory and outsourcing production. In August 2023, trespassers broke into the factory, causing "extensive damage" and making the site "inaccessible". This hampered the firm's ability to fulfil tea orders and accelerated the final migration from the site and sale, which took place in June 2024 for the reduced price of £4.3 million as a result of damage from the trespass.

In November 2024, Typhoo fell into administration, citing a sales slump, deepening losses and rising debts. In December 2024, Typhoo Tea was acquired for £10.2 million by Manchester-based consumer goods wholesaler Supreme. In April 2025, Supreme opened a new Typhoo Tea factory in Gloucester called The Plant.

== Sponsorships ==
In 2012, Typhoo became the main jersey sponsor for St. Helens Rugby league club which competes in the Super League.

== Slogans ==
The Typhoo brand is well known in Britain for its long-running television commercial campaign jingles, such as:

- Putting 'T' back into Britain
- There's only one 'T' in Typhoo
- You only get an 'OO' with Typhoo
- For the tea that picks you up, pick up Typhoo
- Making good tea since 1903
- Typhoo Tea - two thumbs fresh
- Great British tea since 1903
