= Simon Digby (died 1519) =

English nobleman

Simon Digby (died 1519) was lord of Coleshill, in Warwickshire, England.

He was the second son of Sir Everard Digby, Lord of Tilton and Drystoke in the County of Rutland. Sir Everard and four of his sons were killed at the 1461 Battle of Towton, a part of the Wars of the Roses.

In 1477, Simon Digby was knighted by the Yorkist King Edward IV, but he fought eight years later on the victorious Lancastrian side at the Battle of Bosworth Field. For his services, he was rewarded with extensive lands in Rutland. He also fought at the Battle of Stoke Field in 1487, for which he received the manor at Revesby, Lincolnshire. The following year, "he was appointed Comptroller to the petty customs in the port of London."

Simon de Montford was executed in 1495 for contributing to the fund of Perkin Warbeck, who was plotting to oust King Henry VII from the throne. During de Montford's imprisonment in the Tower of London, the King granted his lands at Coleshill to Simon Digby, who was the Deputy Constable of the Tower. Descendants of Simon Digby (Wingfield-Digby) still hold the titles.

Simon Digby married Alice, heir of John Walleys of East Haddon, Devon. They had two sons and three daughters.

He died in 1519, and was succeeded by his eldest son, Reginald. He was survived by his wife. They are buried in the parish church of St Peter and St Paul, Coleshill.
