= Walter Cooper Dendy =

English surgeon and writer

Walter Cooper Dendy (1 October 1794 – 10 December 1871) was an English surgeon and writer.

== Career ==
Dendy was born in 1794 to Stephen Cooper Dendy and Marianne Dubbins at or near Horsham in Sussex. After an apprenticeship in that locality he came to London about 1811, and entered himself as a student at Guy's and St. Thomas's hospitals.

He became a member of the College of Surgeons in 1814, and commenced practice in Stamford Street, Blackfriars, changing his residence soon after to 6 Great Eastcheap. He was chosen a fellow of the Medical Society of London, and became president. He was an admirable speaker.

Dendy was not a mere surgeon; he was conspicuous for cultivated taste and polished manners. He published a poem of much merit entitled ‘Zone,’ and the ‘Philosophy of Mystery,’ 1841, a treatise on dreams, spectral illusions, and other imperfect manifestations of the mind. He held some peculiar religious views, but his mind was too much imbued with enthusiasm for him to be a materialist. He was the author of many books, and contributed largely to medical journals, and was the writer of some remarkable papers in the ‘Psychological Journal.’ He was an admirable draughtsman, and illustrated his own works. His last efforts with his pencil were some sketches of the scenes described by the poet Cowper in the neighbourhood of Olney and Weston Underwood. For a long period he acted as senior surgeon to the Royal Infirmary for Children in the Waterloo Road. He was nominated a fellow of the Anthropological Society of London on 2 April 1867, and on 3 Nov. 1868 read a paper on ‘Anthropogenesis’ before the society, which contained a trenchant attack on the Darwinian doctrines. He was retired in his habits, and, with the exception of attending the annual dinner of the Medical Society and the biennial festival of the students of Guy's Hospital, he seldom appeared at any convivial meetings of the profession.

Having retired from practice, he occupied his time in the reading-room of the British Museum, where his eccentric costume made him a well-known character. After a short illness he died at 25 Suffolk Street, Haymarket, London, on 10 December 1871, aged 77.

His book On the Phenomena of Dreams, and Other Transient Illusions (1832), was an early work that attempted to find medical explanations for dreams and psychical experiences.

== Publications ==
- A Treatise on the Cutaneous Diseases incidental to Childhood (1827)
- On the Phenomena of Dreams and other Transient Illusions (1832)
- The Book of the Nursery (1833)
- Practical Remarks on the Diseases of the Skin (1837, 2nd ed. 1854)
- Philosophy of Mystery (1841, 2nd ed. 1845)
- Hints on Health and Diseases of the Skin (1843, 2nd ed. 1846)
- Monograph I. On the Cerebral Diseases of Children (1848)
- Wonders displayed by the Human Body in the Endurance of Injury. From the Portfolio of Delta (1848.
- Portraits of the Diseases of the Scalp (1849)
- The varieties of Pock delineated and described (1853)
- Psyche, a Discourse on the Birth and Pilgrimage of Thought (1853)
- The Beautiful Islets of Britaine (1857, 2nd ed. 1860)
- The Islets of the Channel (1858)
- The Wild Hebrides (1859)
- A Gleam of the Spirit Mystery (1861)
- Legends of the Lintel and the Ley (1863)
