= William Shearman =

British physician and medical writer

William Shearman (January, 1767 – 21 November 1861), or Sherman, was a British physician and medical writer.

== Life ==
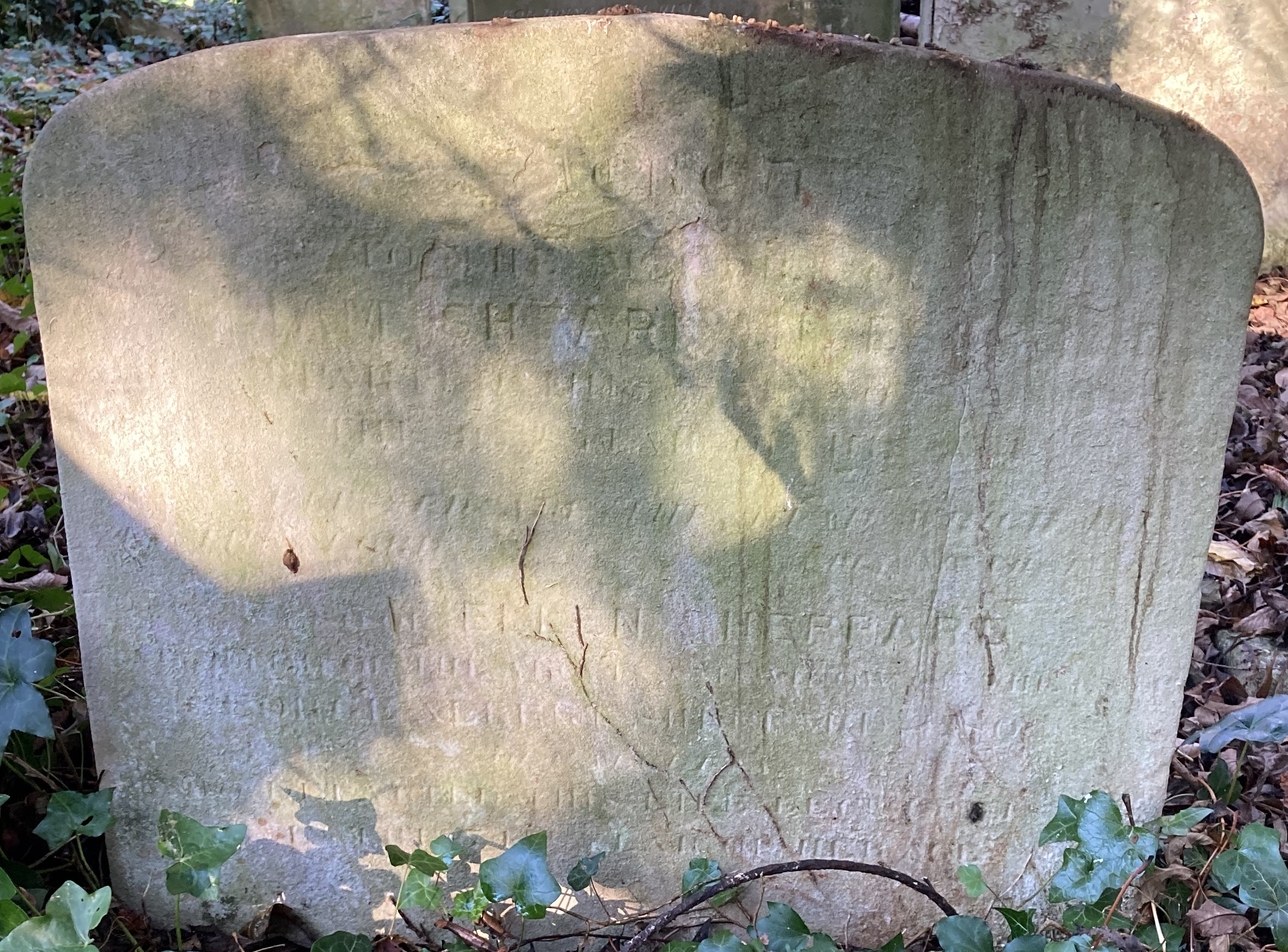
Grave of William Shearman in Highgate Cemetery

Shearman was born in Harwich and graduated an M.D. from Edinburgh on 12 September 1807 (with a dissertation on pneumonia), and was admitted as a licentiate of the Royal College of Physicians, London, on 11 April 1808. He commenced practice as a physician in London, but soon removed to Maidstone, whence he returned to the metropolis in 1813. He practised for many years in Northampton Square, Clerkenwell, and subsequently, until his death, at 17 Canonbury Villas, Islington. He was physician to the London Dispensary from 1813 to 1824, to the Infirmary for Children in Waterloo Road from 1816, and to the West London Infirmary and Lying-in Institution in Villiers Street from 1821. He was the senior member of the medical staff when the last-named institution became the Charing Cross Hospital, a position which he retained in the new hospital until 1852. To the Charing Cross Hospital school of medicine he rendered important services by his annual lectures on the theory and practice of medicine. His Introductory Lecture was published in 1834. In 1852 he became consulting physician, and retired from practice. For several years he filled the office of treasurer to the Medical Society of London, in 1824 was president of the society, and in 1834 published an oration delivered before it.

He died on 21 November 1861 at the age of ninety-four, and was buried on the western side of Highgate Cemetery.

== Publications ==
In 1799 he was one of the staff of a periodical called "The New Medical and Physical Journal, or Annals of Medicine, Natural History and Chemistry", and from 1810 to 1812 he was its editor. He continued his connection with the publication until 1815.

- Articles on "Epilepsy", "Vaccination", and "Circulation", in Medical Reports (1824).
- Observations Illustrative of the History and Treatment of Chronic Debility, the Prolific Source of Indigestion, Spasmodic Diseases and Various Nervous Affections (1824).
- An Essay on the Nature, Causes, and Treatment of Water on the Brain (London, 1825).
