= Simon Mountford (died 1495) =

15th-century English nobleman

Sir Simon Montford (died c. 30 January 1495) was an English Lord of several manors who was executed for treason.

Simon Montford was the son and heir of Sir Baldwin Montfort, Knt, of Coleshill Manor, Warwickshire (1410 – c. 1458) by his spouse Joan, daughter of Sir Richard Vernon, Speaker of the House of Commons. Baldwin was the first to drop the "de" from their surname.

== Lord of Manors ==
He inherited Coleshill (in Arden) Manor, entering into possession of the manor before 4 March 1461. He also held the manor of Kingshurst (in Coleshill), and Avon Dasset, and others. Sir Edward Grey, Viscount Lisle, at his death in 1492, owned pasture and woodland in Alcotenhall (a manor in Coleshill) which was held of this "Sir Simon Montfort, the Lord of Coleshill".

== Career ==
In 1465, Montfort was found guilty of insurrection and various misdeeds, for which he was pardoned the next year. He was retained by King Edward IV to serve in the French wars with five spearmen and sixty archers. In 1469–1470 he was Lieutenant of Carisbrooke Castle on the Isle of Wight. In April 1471 he was appointed sheriff of the counties of Warwick and Leicester. He was subsequently charged with supporting the rebellion of Perkin Warbeck, one of the pretenders during the reign of King Henry VII. He was tried at the London Guildhall on 30 January 1495, found guilty, attainted, and executed, his estates forfeited. Coleshill Manor was awarded to Simon Digby. (The attainder on Kingshurst Manor and lands was reversed in 1534 for his grandson Thomas Montfort, but without restoration of Coleshill).

== Family ==
Montford married Anne (born c. 1440), daughter of Sir Richard Verney, Knt., of Compton Verney, Warwickshire. They had three sons and two daughters.

His grandson, Simon Mountford, was a Member of Parliament.
