= Robert Bruce (trader) =

Robert Bruce (1789–1824) was a Scottish arms trader and mercenary soldier on the north-east frontier of India. He took steps towards the introduction of tea plantations in Assam in the 1820s.

== Life ==
In early life, Bruce was a naval officer. In 1823 a despatch described Bruce as Indian-born. This was doubted, however, by Edward Albert Gait, who mentioned his brother, Charles Alexander Bruce, and his 1809 voyage to India. According to the Dictionary of Indian Biography, Charles Alexander Bruce was born in Assam, at Jorhat. Robert Bruce was resident at Jogighopa.

In 1821, during the Burmese invasions of Assam, Bruce involved himself in the affairs of the Ahom Kingdom. Having helped the deposed Purandar Singha muster and equip an army in the Dooars, with the help of the East India Company, he led it into Ahom in May of that year, against Chandrakanta Singha. Suffering a defeat, he was taken prisoner. He then agreed to support Chandrakanta Singha, against the Burmese forces of the Konbaung dynasty, who was regrouping in the Goalpara district. With guns and ammunition supplied through Bruce, Chandrakanta Singha took back Guwahati at the beginning of 1822.

Robert Bruce is buried in the cemetery in Tezpur town.

== Tea in Assam ==
Bruce learned from Maniram Dewan that the Singpho people grew tea, which was then not generally known. In 1823, while trading at Garhgaon, he encountered a Singpho chief, who was willing to supply him with botanical tea samples. The chief was Bisa Gam. Bruce died soon after, in 1824.

The samples found their way to Charles Alexander Bruce, and then to David Scom.

== See also ==
- Assam Tea
