= Charles Alexander Bruce =

British naval officer, explorer and writer

Charles Alexander Bruce (11 January 1793 – 23 April 1871) was a British naval officer, explorer and writer. He is known as the father of the tea industry in Assam (which was part of the Bengal Presidency from British annexation in 1826 until 1873).

== Life ==
Bruce was born at Jorhat in the Ahom Kingdom. In 1809 he was a midshipman on the Indiaman Windham, sailing from England to India. The vessel was captured by French forces, twice, in the Indian Ocean, and he was taken to Mauritius. There he was imprisoned on a ship, until the British invasion of 1810. He served as an officer on a British troopship in the invasion of Java. In India, he worked initially as an officer of the Bombay Marine. Bruce's brother Robert brought to notice the indigenous Assamese tea plant in 1823 and told Charles of its existence.

In 1824, Bruce served in the First Anglo-Burmese War, during which he was posted to Sadiya and made commander of a division of gunboats. When the war ended, he continued work patrolling the rivers in Assam in gunboats, under Captain Andrew Charlton, a political officer.

In 1835, Bruce was charged by the British East India Company to start tea plantations, and in 1836 resigned his commission with the gunboat flotilla when he was appointed as the superintendent of the Assam tea plantations. At first, the East India Company tried to plant Chinese tea in Assam, but the Chinese plants cross-pollinated with the indigenous tea plants and the experiment was considered a disaster. In Sadiya, Bruce, acting on his own initiative, planted a nursery that consisted just of indigenous plants. In 1836, he sent a sample of the manufactured tea to the tea committee in Delhi. Lord Auckland approved this and tea experts stated that the tea was "of good quality". By 1837, Bruce had a consignment delivered to the tea committee – the consignment consisted of 46 chests filled with tea from the indigenous plants.

In 1838, Bruce wrote An Account of the Manufacture of the Black Tea, As Now Practised at Suddeya in Upper Assam, By The Chinamen Sent Thither For That Purpose. In 1839 the first consignment of Indian tea was put up for auction in Mincing Lane, London. It consisted of eight chests weighing 350 pounds, auctioned on 10 January. In 1871, Bruce received the gold medal from the Royal Society of Arts for cultivation of the indigenous tea plants in Assam. He died aged 78 in Assam, where he was buried in the Christian graveyard at Tezpur.
