= Assam tea =

Black tea

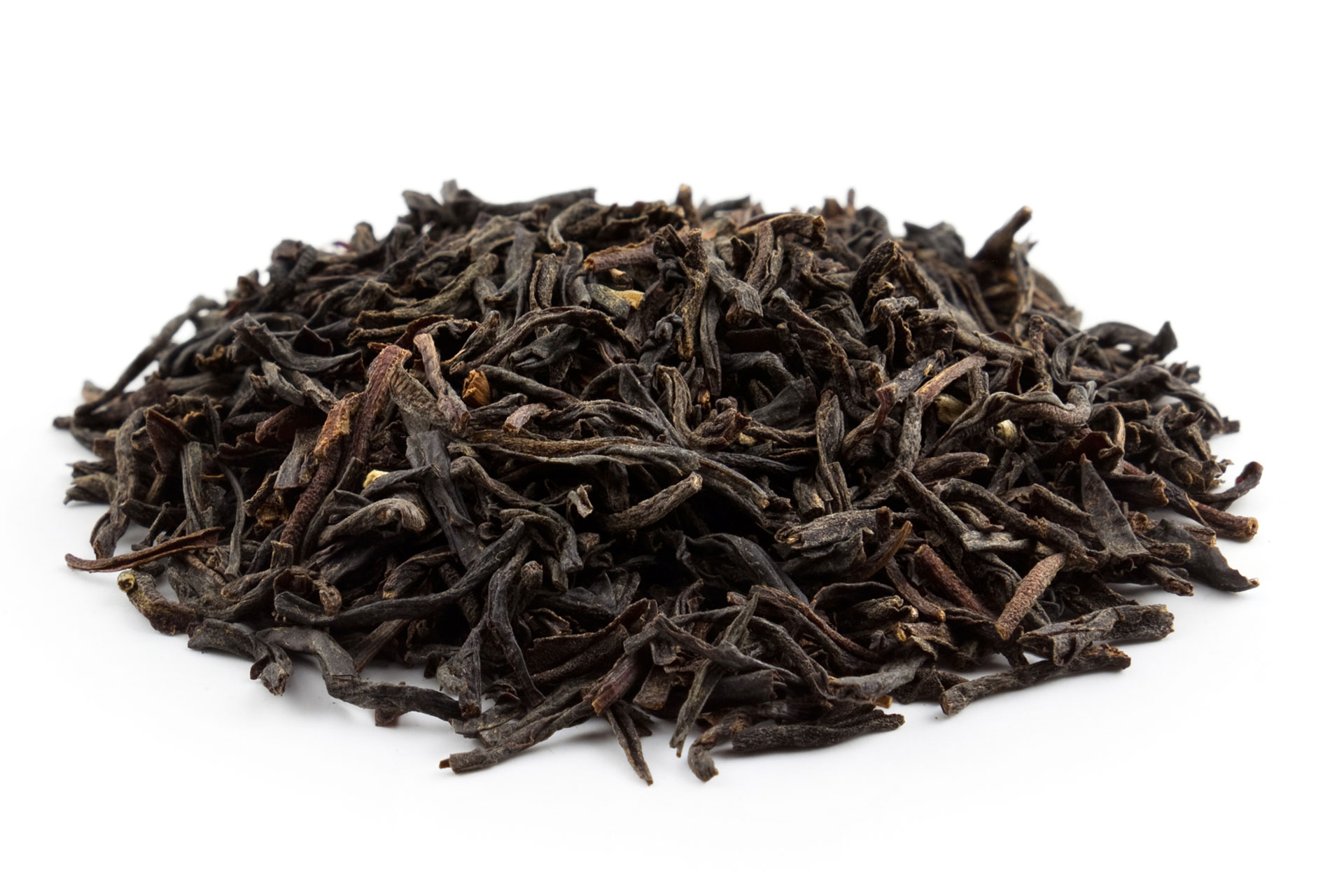
- Type: Black
- Origin: Assam, India
- Quick description: Brisk and malty with a bright colour.

Assam tea is a black tea named after Assam, India, the region of its production. It is manufactured specifically from the plant Camellia sinensis var. assamica (Masters). Assam's people tried to plant the Chinese varieties in Assam soil but did not succeed. Assam tea is now mostly grown at or near sea level and is known for its body, briskness, malty flavour, and strong, bright colour. Assam teas, or blends containing Assam tea, are often sold as "breakfast" teas. For instance, Irish breakfast tea, a maltier and stronger breakfast tea, consists of small-sized Assam tea leaves.

The state of Assam is the world's largest tea-growing region by production, lying on either side of the Brahmaputra River, and bordering Bhutan, Bangladesh, Myanmar and very close to China. This part of India experiences high rainfall; during the monsoon period, as much as 250 to 300 mm (10 to 12 in) of rain falls per day. The daytime temperature rises to about 36 °C (96.8 °F), creating greenhouse-like conditions of extreme humidity and heat. This tropical climate contributes to Assam tea's unique malty taste, a feature for which this tea is well known.

Though Assam generally denotes the distinctive black teas from Assam, the region produces smaller quantities of green and white teas as well, with their own distinctive characteristics. Historically, Assam has been the second commercial tea production region after southern China, the only two regions in the world with native tea plants.

The introduction of the Assam tea bush to Europe is related to Robert Bruce, a Scottish adventurer, who apparently encountered it in the year 1823. Bruce reportedly found the plant growing "wild" in Assam while trading in the region. Maniram Dewan directed him to the local Singpho chief Bessa Gam. Bruce noticed local people (the Singhpos) brewing tea from the leaves of the bush and arranged with the local chiefs to provide him with samples of the leaves and seeds, which he planned to have scientifically examined. Robert Bruce died shortly thereafter, without having seen the plant properly classified. It was not until the early 1830s that Robert's brother, Charles, arranged for a few leaves from the Assam tea bush to be sent to the botanical gardens in Calcutta for proper examination. There, the plant was finally identified as a variety of tea, or Camellia sinensis var assamica, but different from the Chinese version (Camellia sinensis var. sinensis). The indigenous Assam tea plant was first mentioned by a historian called Samuel Baidon who published Tea in Assam in 1877.

== History ==
While on a trade expedition through the Assam area with Singpho in 1823, Robert Bruce was introduced to a plant with which the Singpho and Khamti people made beverages and food. Through his brother, Charles Alexander Bruce who was in Sadiya, samples were sent to botanist Nathaniel Wallich who mistook it for camellia kissi. It was not until over a decade later that the Singpho's plant would be recognized as being the same plant as the Camellia sinensis growing in China, after Francis Jenkins and Andrew Charlton responded to the request of the British East India Company's Tea Committee for its agents to review prospects for establishing a source of tea outside of China.

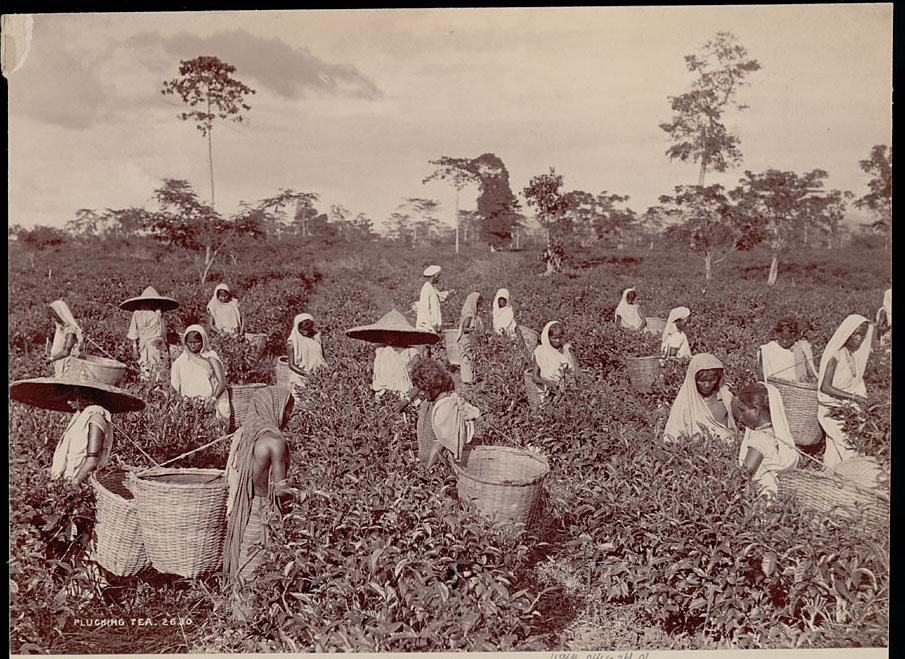
Assam tea workers, c.1903

Charles Bruce guided a team, including Nathaniel Wallich, William Griffith and John McClelland, dispatched from the Tea Committee in 1836, to review the plant in its natural growing conditions around Sadiya. It was cultivated in the company's experimental garden with the first batch shipped to London in 1838 and auctioned in January 1839. Though it sold well the batch was noted as lacking fragrance compared to the tea from China which had been selectively cultivated for hundreds of years and having a dullness thought to be a consequence of inexperienced processing.

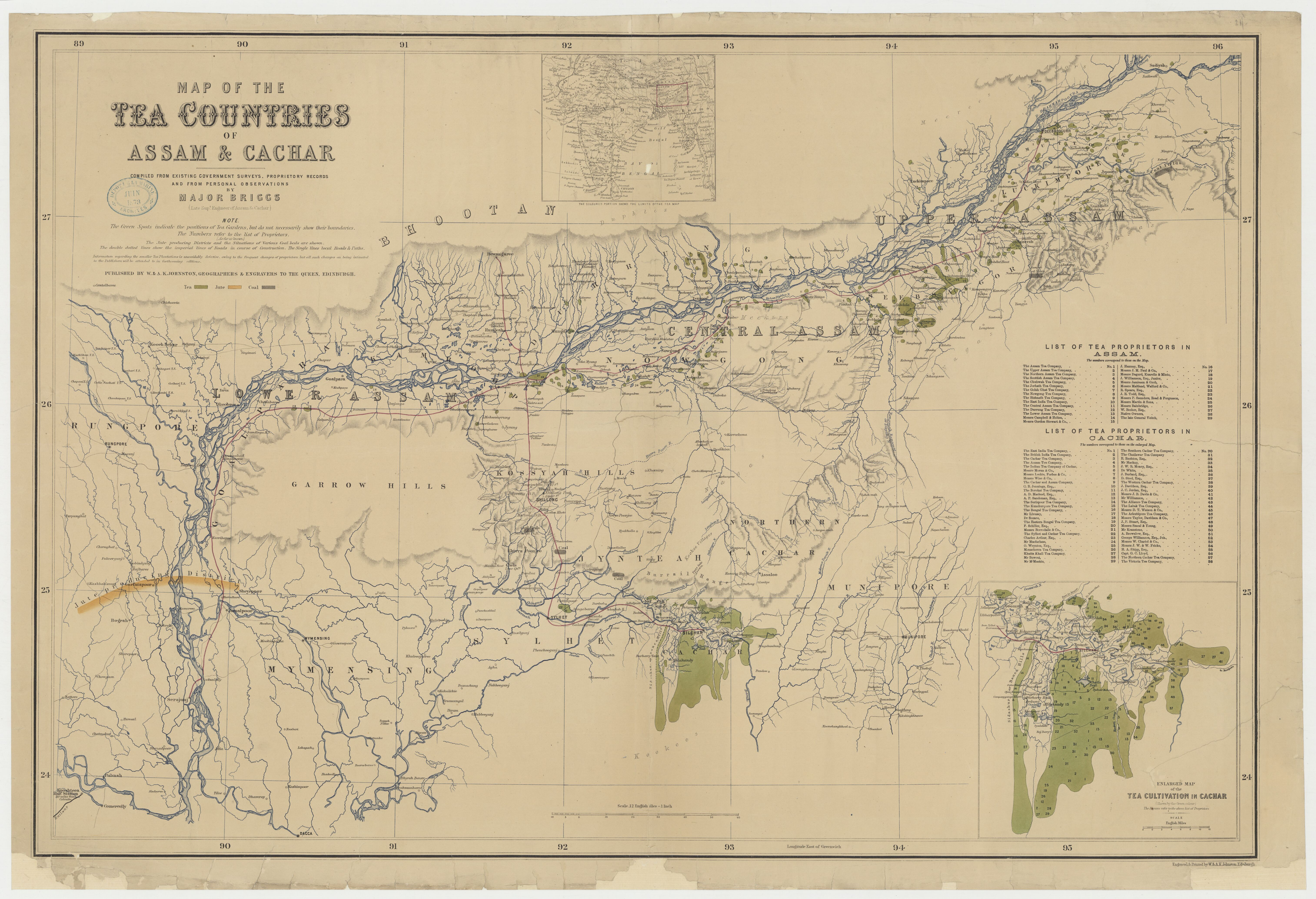
Map of colonial tea plantations set up in Assam and Cachar, dated 1873

That same year, two companies were incorporated to pursue the tea's development in Assam: the Assam Tea Association in London and the Bengal Tea Association in Kolkata, though they quickly amalgamated to form the Assam Company. Despite early proponents such as Maniram Dewan, British-led land reforms such as the Waste Lands Act to clear and privatize plots of land for agricultural purposes, the Assam Company struggled and was forced to reorganize in 1847. Similarly, despite having access to a large source of inexpensive labour, including tea-makers smuggled out of China, indentured Indians, and refugees from famine-stricken areas, Assam at the time was a sparsely populated, hot and humid undeveloped area and many died of disease. Despite the poor results, investment came from Britain to establish additional tea gardens, such as the Jorehaut Tea Company around Jorhat, in 1860s though by 1870 56 of the 60 companies operating tea gardens in Assam went bankrupt. Industrial mechanization in the 1870s finally resulted in profitable companies as more plucked leaves were able to be dried without rotting in the humid environment. Heated withering tables and steam-powered rolling machines precipitated a need for grading so the British adapted the existing systems of tea leaf grading to sort their products. The Indian Tea Districts Association was established in London in 1879 and in Kolkata in 1881 (as the Indian Tea Association) to organize and advance these tea interests. By 1888 tea imported from India finally exceeded that from China.

== Production ==
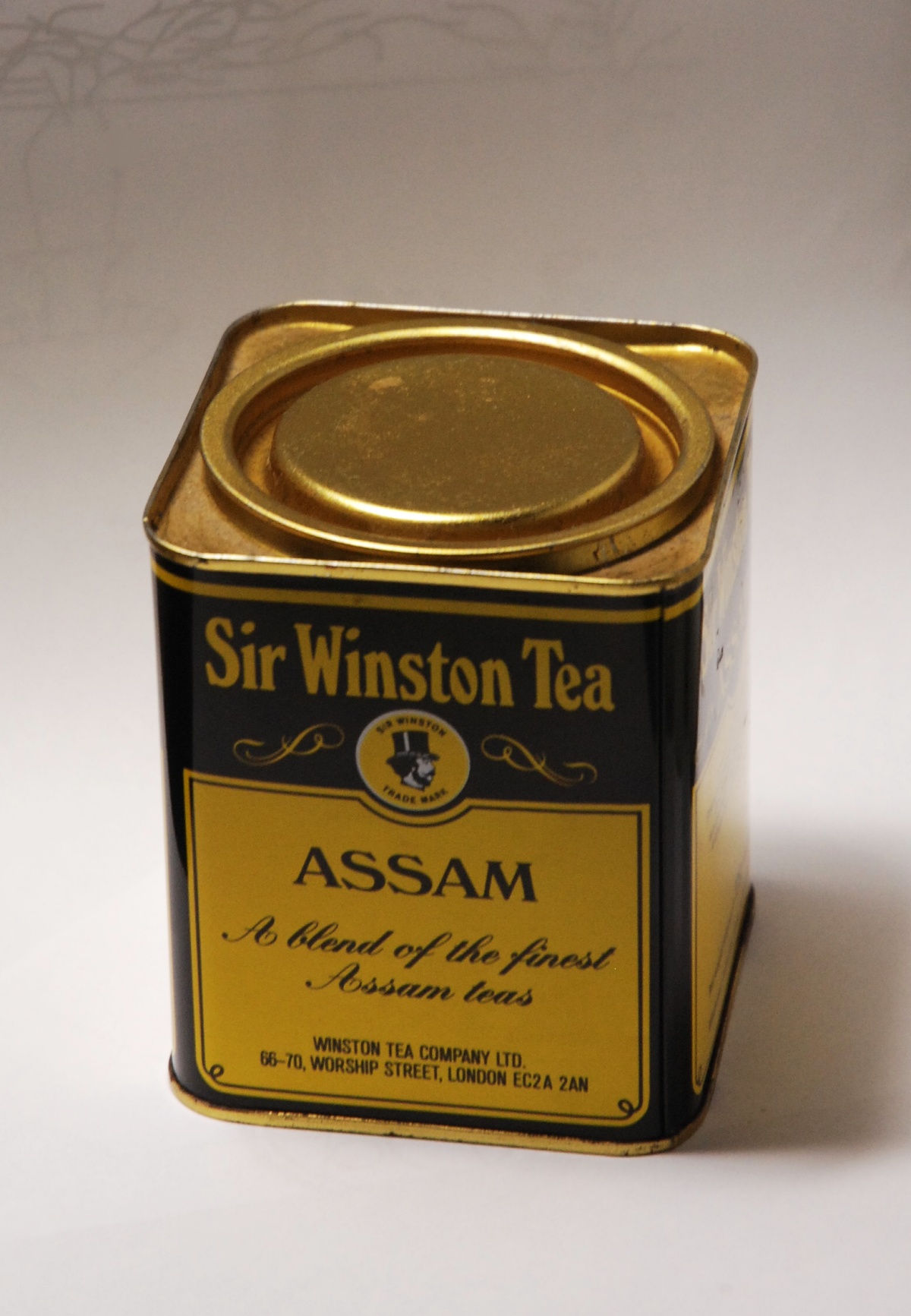
A tin of Assam tea

Most of the currently operating tea estates in Assam are members of the Assam Branch of the Indian Tea Association (ABITA), which is the oldest and most prominent body of tea producers of India.

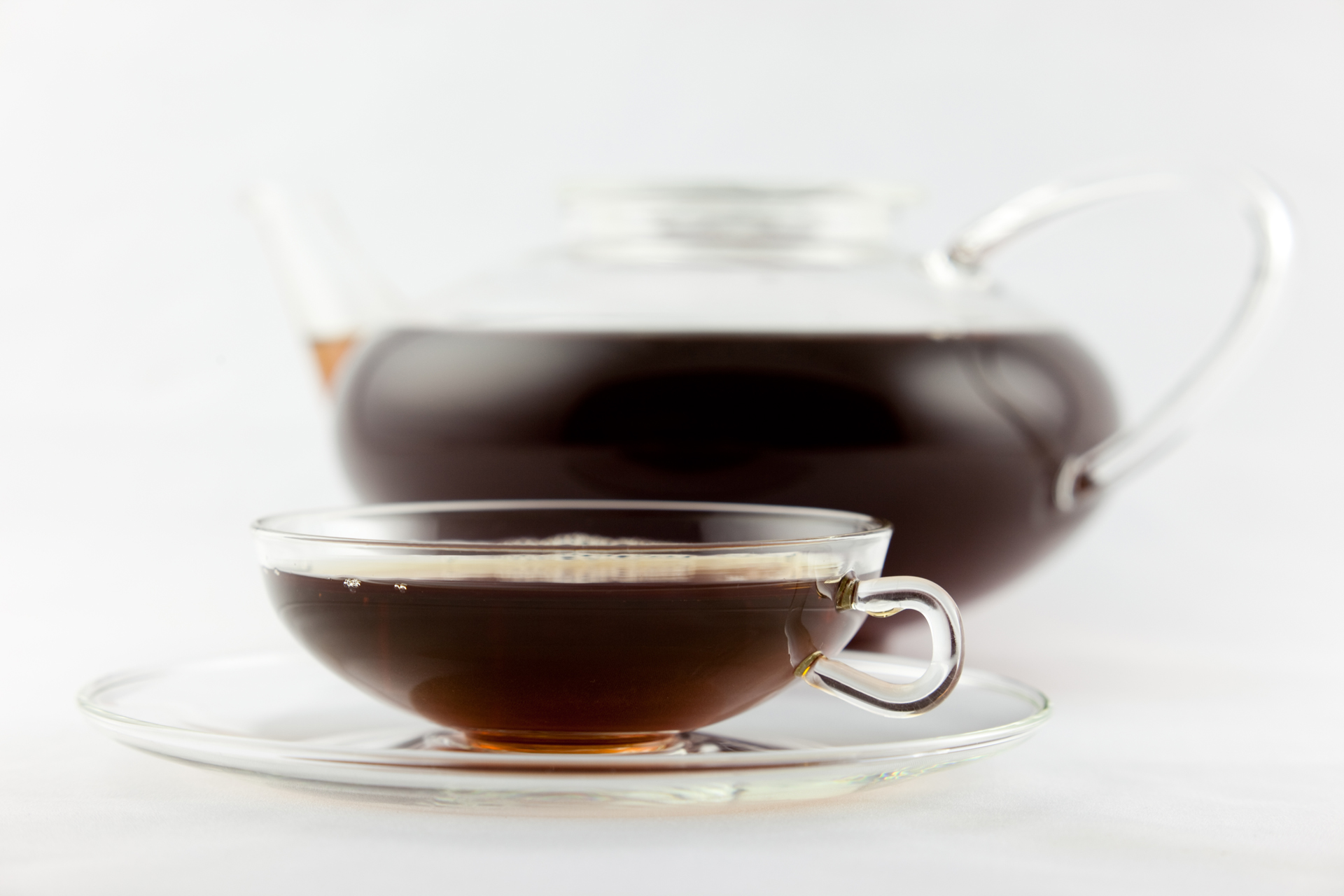
Assam tea in a cup

=== Steps ===
There are between two and seven steps involved in the processing of fresh tea leaves, the addition or exclusion of any of these stages resulting in a different type of tea. Each of these procedures is carried out in a climate-controlled facility to avoid spoilage due to excess moisture and fluctuating temperatures.

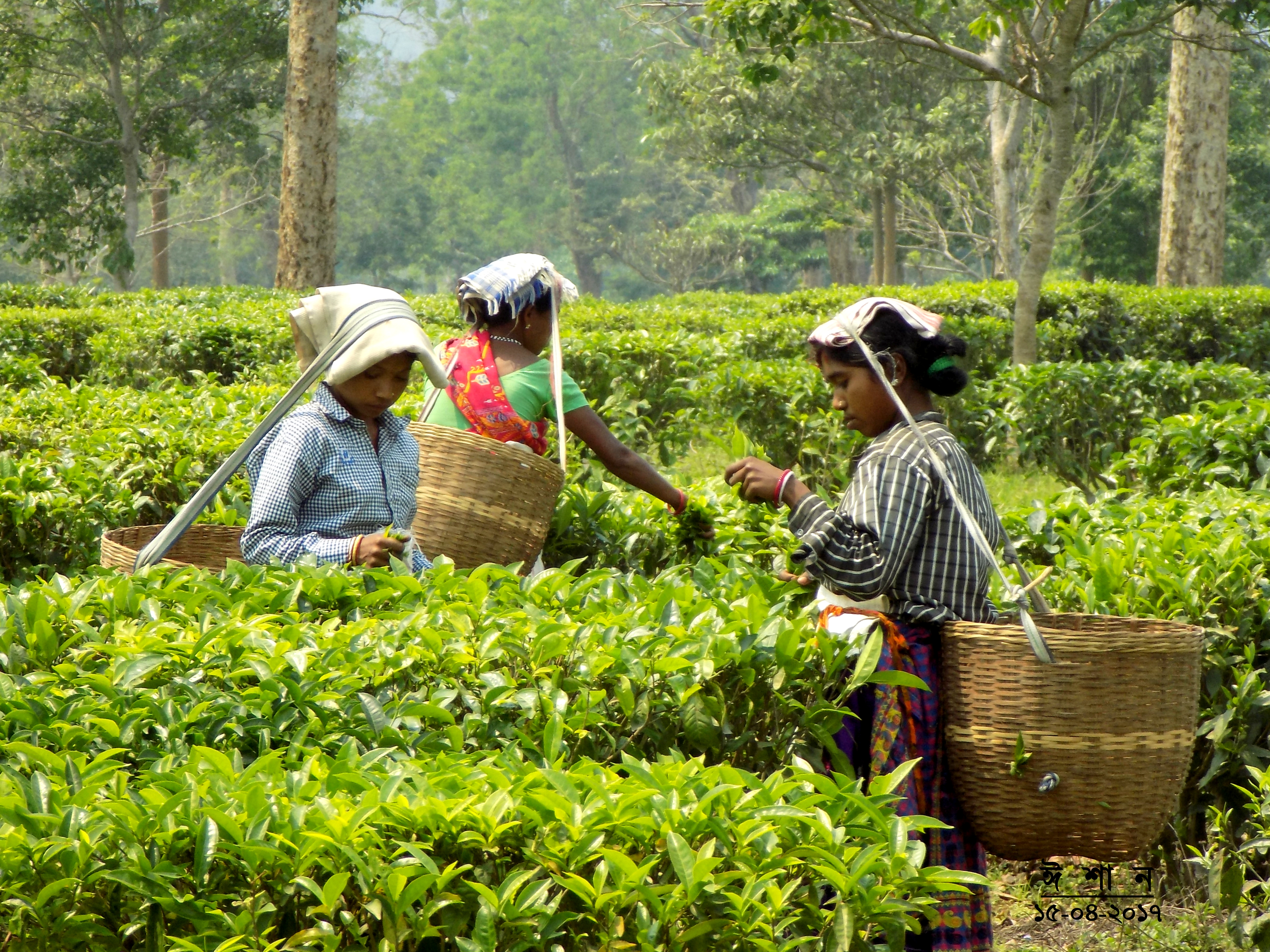
Women plucking tea in a tea estate of Assam

Withering refers to the wilting of fresh green tea leaves. The purpose of withering is to reduce the moisture content in the leaves and to allow the flavor compounds to develop. While it can be done outdoors, controlled withering usually takes place indoors. Freshly plucked leaves are laid out in a series of troughs and subjected to hot air forced from underneath the troughs. During the course of withering, the moisture content in the leaf is reduced by about 30%, making the leaf look limp and soft enough for rolling. Additionally, the volatile compounds in the leaf, including the level of caffeine and the flavors, begin to intensify. A short wither allows the leaves to retain a greenish appearance and grassy flavors while a longer wither darkens the leaf and intensifies the aromatic compounds.

Fixing or kill-green refers to the process by which enzymatic browning of the wilted leaves is controlled through the application of heat. It is held that the longer it takes to fix the leaves, the more aromatic the tea will be. Fixing is carried out via steaming, pan firing, baking or with the use of heated tumblers. Application of steam heats the leaves more quickly than pan firing, as a result of which steamed teas taste ‘green’ and vegetal while the pan-fired ones taste toasty. This procedure is carried out for green teas, yellow teas and raw pu'er teas.

Oxidation results in the browning of the leaves and intensification of their flavor compounds. From the moment they are plucked, the cells within the tea leaves are exposed to oxygen and the volatile compounds within them begin to undergo chemical reactions. It is at this stage that polyphenolic oxidase, including theaflavin and thearubigin, begin to develop within the leaves. Theaflavins lend briskness and brightness to the tea while thearubigins offer depth and fullness to the liquor that's produced. In order to bring out specific intensities in flavors, tea makers control the amount of oxidation the leaves undergo. Controlled-oxidation is typically carried out in a large room where the temperature is maintained at 25–30 °C and humidity stands steady at 60–70%. Here, withered and rolled leaves are spread out on long shelves and left to ferment for a fixed period of time, depending on the type of tea being made. To halt or slow down oxidation, fermented leaves are moved to a panning trough where they are heated and then dried. Due to oxidation, the leaves undergo a complete transformation and exhibit an aroma and taste profile that's completely different from the profile of the leaves that do not undergo this process. Less oxidized teas tend to retain most of their green color and vegetal characteristics due to lower production of polyphenols. A semi-oxidized leaf has a brown appearance and produces yellow-amber liquor. In a fully oxidized tea, amino acids and lipids break down completely, turning the leaves blackish-brown. The flavors in such a tea are more brisk and imposing.

Rolling involves shaping the processed leaves into a tight form. As a part of this procedure, wilted / fixed leaves are gently rolled, and depending on the style, they are shaped to look wiry, kneaded, or as tightly rolled pellets. During the rolling action, essential oils and sap tend to ooze out of the leaves, intensifying the taste further. The more tightly rolled the leaves, the longer they will retain their freshness.

Drying In order to keep the tea moisture-free, the leaves are dried at various stages of production. Drying enhances a tea's flavors and ensures its long shelf-life. Also, drying brings down the tea's moisture content to less than 1%. To dry the leaves they are fired or roasted at a low temperature for a controlled period of time, typically inside an industrial scale oven. If the leaves are dried too quickly, the tea can turn abrasive and taste harsh.

Aging some teas are subjected to aging and fermentation to make them more palatable. Some types of Chinese Pu-erh, for example, are fermented and aged for years, much like wine.

=== Separate time zone ===
Tea gardens in Assam do not follow the Indian Standard Time (IST), which is the time observed throughout India and Sri Lanka. The local time in Assam's tea gardens, known as "Tea Garden Time" or Sah Bagan Time (also used by Myanmar as MMT), is an hour ahead of the IST. The system was introduced during British rule keeping in mind the early sunrise in this part of the country.

By and large, the system has subsequently been successful in increasing the productivity of tea garden workers as they save on daylight by finishing the work during daytime, and vice versa. Working time for tea laborers in the gardens is generally between 9 a.m. (IST 8 a.m.) to 5 p.m. (IST 4 p.m.) It may vary slightly from garden to garden.

== Geography ==
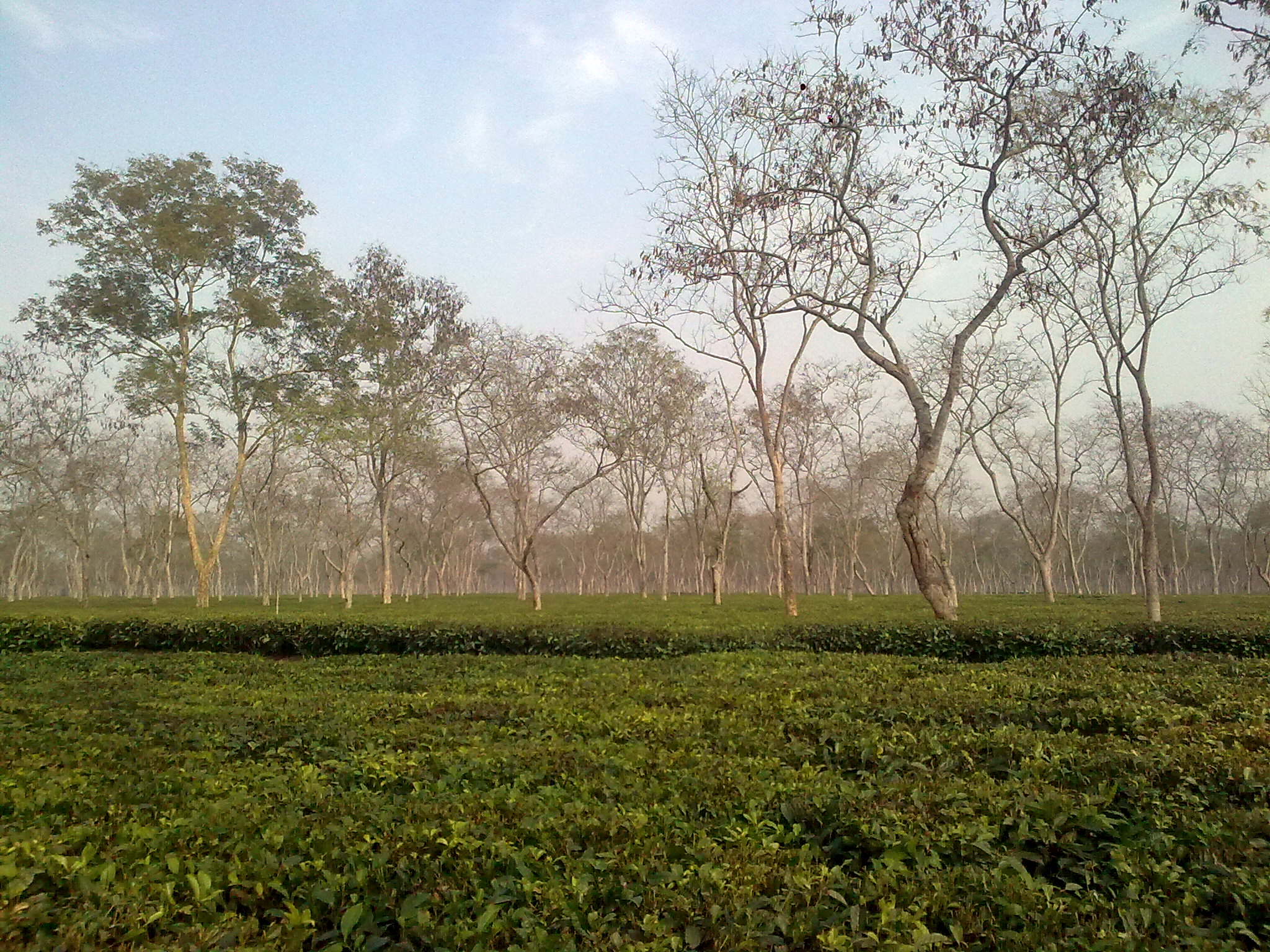
An Assam tea garden

The tea plant is grown in the lowlands of Assam, unlike Darjeelings and Nilgiris, which are grown in the highlands. It is cultivated in the valley of the Brahmaputra River, an area of clay soil rich in the nutrients of the floodplain. The climate varies between a cool, arid winter and a hot, humid rainy season—conditions ideal for growing tea. Because of its long growing season and generous rainfall, Assam is one of the most prolific tea-producing regions in the world. Each year, the tea estates of Assam collectively yield approximately 680.5 million kg (1,500 million pounds weight) of tea.

Assam tea is generally harvested twice, in a "first flush" and a "second flush". The first flush is picked during late March. The second flush, harvested later, is the more prized "tippy tea", named thus for the gold tips that appear on the leaves. This second flush, tippy tea, is sweeter and more full-bodied and is generally considered superior to the first flush tea. The leaves of the Assam tea bush are dark green and glossy and fairly wide compared to those of the Chinese tea plant. The bush produces delicate white blossoms.

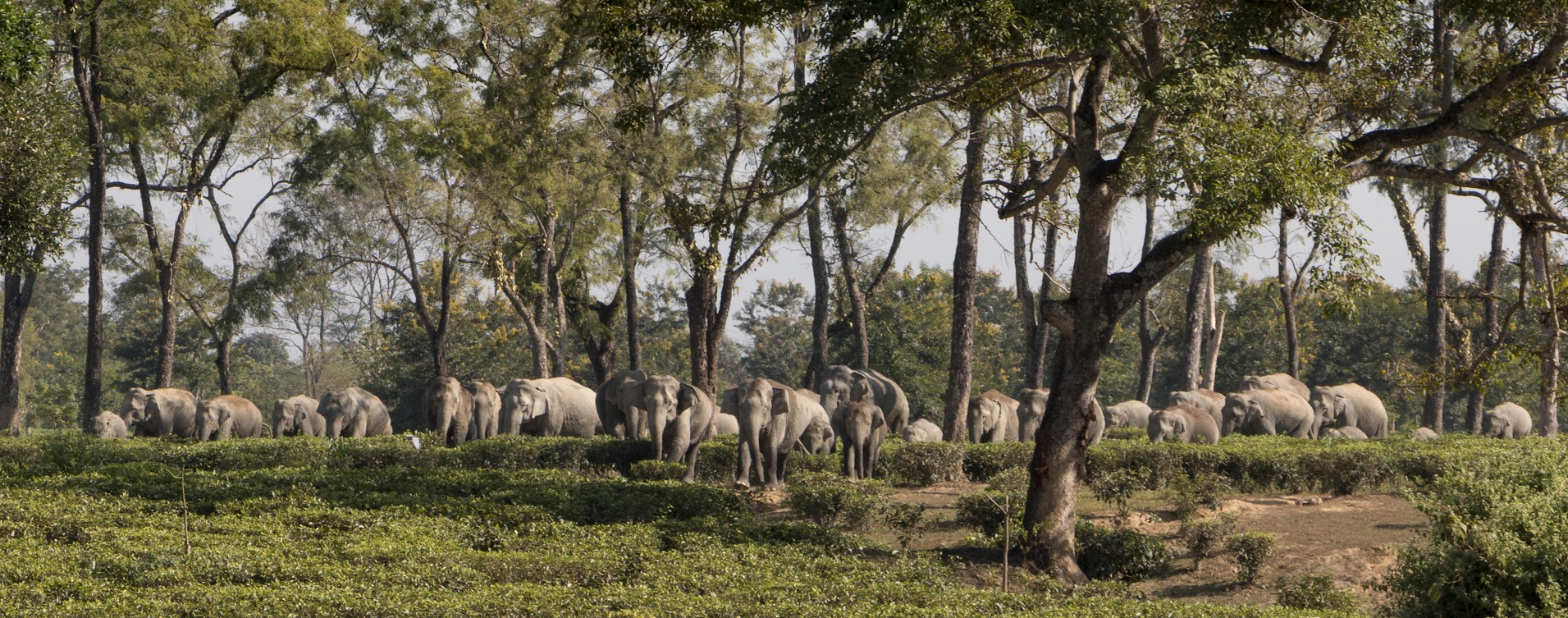
A herd of wild elephants in an elephant-friendly tea garden in India.

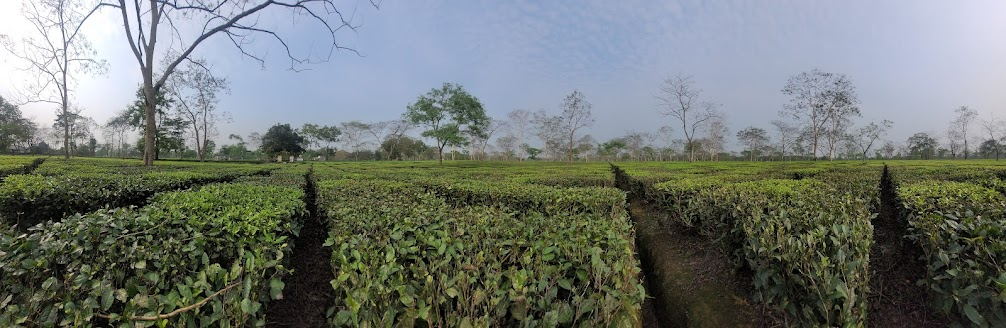
Tea garden in Keyhung Tea Estates, Assam

== See also ==
- Tea leaf grading
- Tea-tribes of Assam
- Indian Tea Association
- Tocklai Tea Research Institute
