= Maniram Dewan =

Indian independence activists and an assamese nobleman

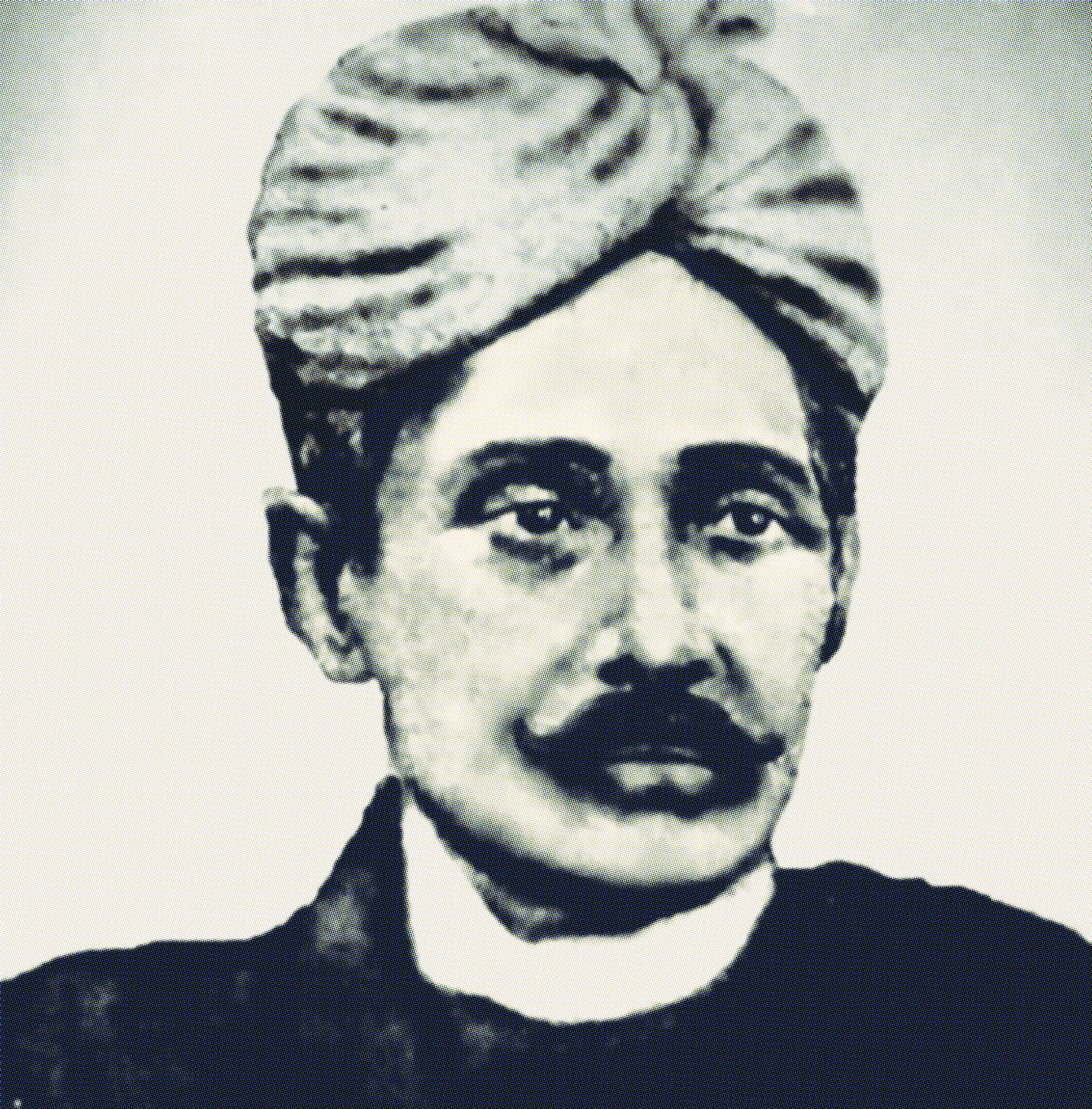
- Born: Maniram Dutta Barua; 17 April 1806; Charing, Sibsagar
- Died: 26 February 1858 (aged 51); Central Jail Jorhat
- Cause of death: Hanging
- Other names: Maniram Borbhandar Barua, Moniram Dewan
- Occupations: Dewan, Tea cultivator
- Organization: Assam Tea Company
- Known for: Participation in the 1857 uprising
- Notable work: Buranji Bibekratna (1838)
- Criminal charge: Waging war against the British East India Company government in Assam
- Criminal penalty: Death by hanging

Maniram Dutta Baruah, popularly known as Maniram Dewan (17 April 1806 – 26 February 1858), was an Assamese nobleman in British India. He was one of the first people to establish tea gardens in Assam. While he was a loyal ally of the British East India Company in his early years, later he was hanged by the British for conspiring against them during the 1857 uprising. He was popular among the people of Upper Assam as "Kalita Raja" (king from the Kalita caste).

== Early life ==
During the Burmese invasions of Assam (1817–1826), Maniram's family sought asylum in Bengal, which was under the control of the British East India Company. The family returned to Assam under the British protection, during the early days of the First Anglo-Burmese War (1824–1826). The East India Company defeated the Burmese and gained the control of Assam through the Treaty of Yandabo (1826).

== British associate ==
Early in his career, Maniram became a loyal associate of the British East India Company administration under David Scott, the Agent of the Governor General in North East India. In 1828, the 22-year-old Maniram was appointed as a tehsildar and a sheristadar of Rangpur under Scott's deputy Captain John Bryan Neufville.

Later, Maniram was made a borbhandar (Prime Minister) by Purandar Singha, the titular ruler of Assam during 1833–1838. He continued to be an associate of Purandar's son Kameswar Singha and grandson Kandarpeswar Singha. Maniram became a loyal confidante of Purandar Singha, and resigned from the posts of sheristadar and tehsildar, when the King was deposed by the British.

== Tea cultivation ==
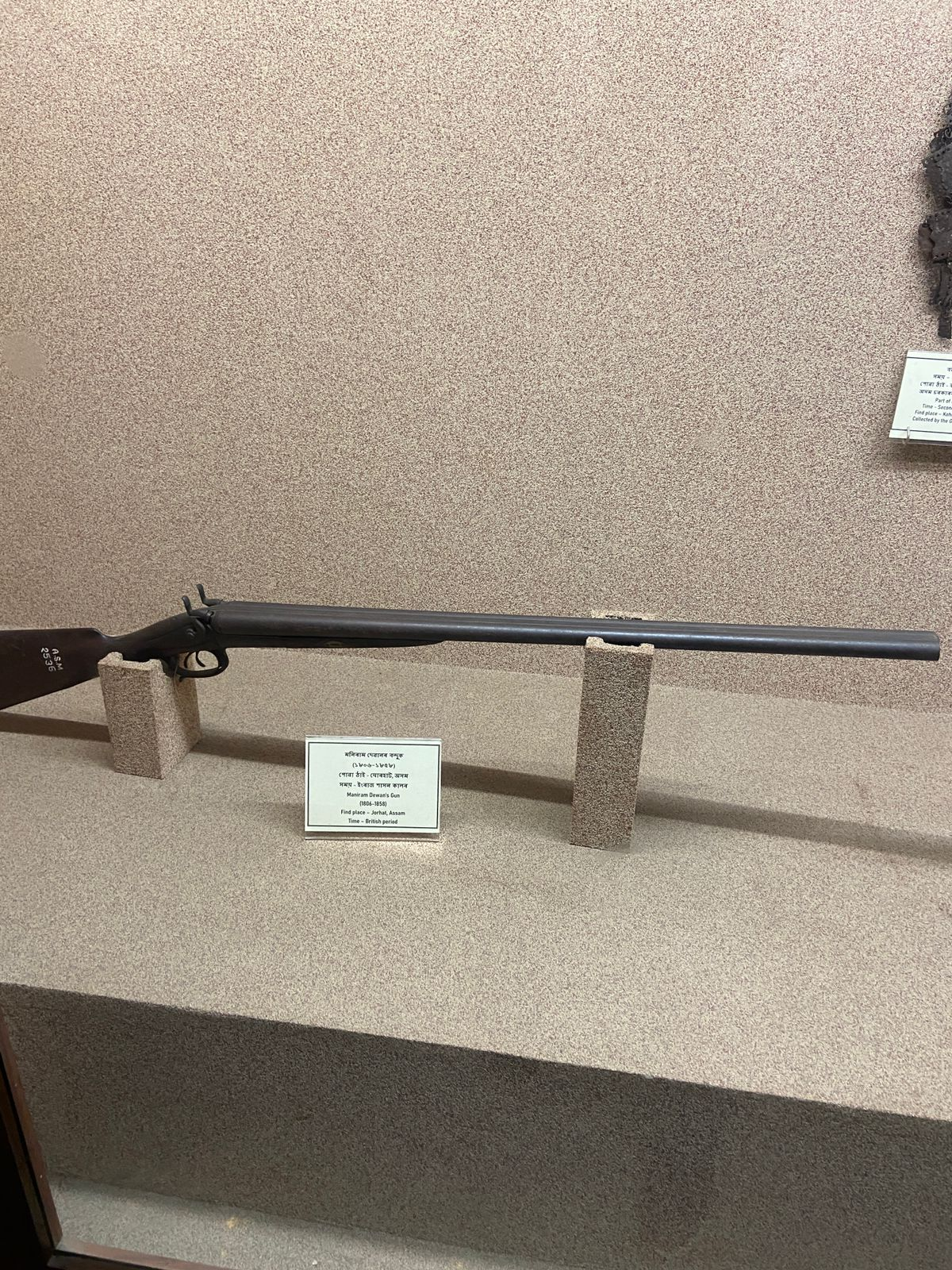
Gun of Maniram Dewan

It was Maniram who informed the British about the Assam tea grown by the Singpho people, which was hitherto unknown to the rest of the world. In the early 1820s, he directed the cultivators Major Robert Bruce and his brother Charles Alexander Bruce to the local Singpho chief Bessa Gaum. Charles Bruce collected the tea plants from the Singphos and took them to the Company administration. However, Dr. Nathaniel Wallich, the superintendent of the Calcutta Botanical Garden declared that these samples were not of the same species as the tea plants of China.

In 1833, after its monopoly on the Chinese tea trade ended, the East India Company decided to establish major tea plantations in India. Lord William Bentinck established the Tea Committee on 1 February 1834 towards achieving this goal. The committee sent out circulars asking about the suitable places for tea cultivation, to which Captain F. Jenkins responded, suggesting Assam. The tea plant samples collected by his assistant Lieutenant Charlton were acknowledged by Dr. Wallich as genuine tea. When the Tea Committee visited Assam to study the feasibility of tea cultivation, Maniram met Dr. Wallich as a representative of Purandar Singha, and highlighted the region's prospects for tea cultivation.

In 1839, Maniram became the Dewan of the Assam Tea Company at Nazira, drawing a salary of 200 rupees per month. In the mid-1840s, he quit his job due to differences of opinion with the company officers. By this time, Maniram had acquired tea cultivation expertise. He established his own Cinnamara tea garden at Cinnamara in Jorhat, thus becoming the first Indian Tea Planter to grow tea commercially in Assam. Jorhat later became home to the tea research laboratory Tocklai Experimental Station. He established another plantation at Selung (or Singlo) in Sibsagar.

Apart from the tea industry, Maniram also ventured into iron smelting, gold procuring and salt production. He was also involved in the manufacturing of goods like matchlocks, hoes and cutlery. His other business activities included handloom, boat making, brick making, bellmetal, dyeing, ivory work, ceramic, coal supply, elephant trade, construction of buildings for military headquarters and agricultural products. Some of the markets established by him include the Garohat in Kamrup, Nagahat near Sivasagar, Borhat in Dibrugarh, Sissihat in Dhemaji and Darangia Haat in Darrang.

== Anti-British plot ==
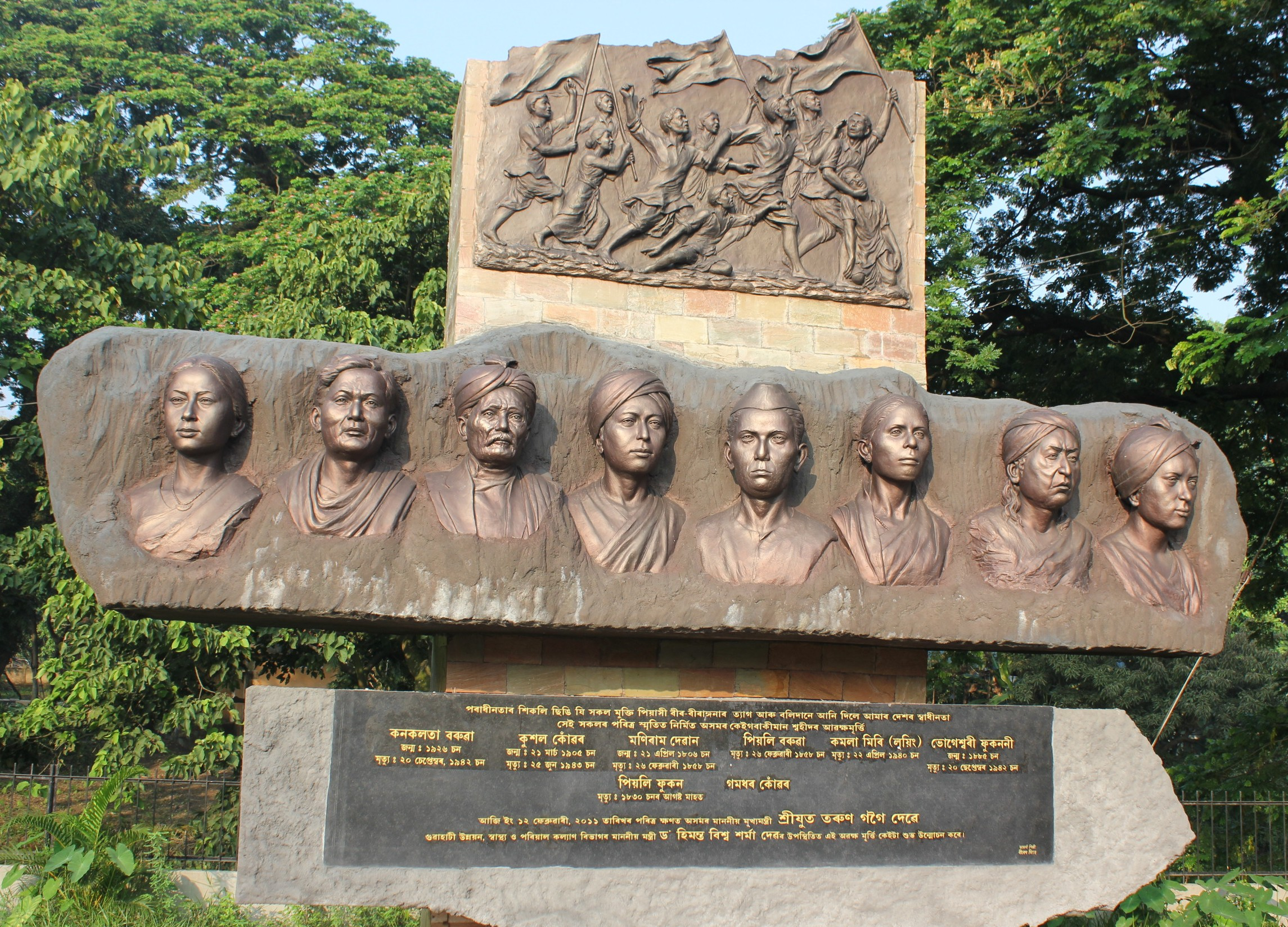
A sculpture of some martyrs from Assam

By the 1850s, Maniram had become hostile to the British. He had faced numerous administrative obstacles in establishing private tea plantations, due to opposition from the competing European tea planters. In 1851, captain Charles Holroyd, the chief officer of Sibsagar seized all the facilities provided to him due to a tea garden dispute. Maniram, whose family consisted of 185 people, had to face economic hardship.

In 1852, Maniram presented a petition to A.G. Moffat Mills, the judge of the Sadar Court, Calcutta. He wrote that the people of Assam had been "reduced to the most abject and hopeless state of misery from the loss of their fame, honour, rank, caste, employment etc." He pointed out that the British policies were aimed at recovering the expenses incurred in conquering the Assam province from the Burmese, resulting in exploitation of the local economy. He protested against the waste of money on frivolous court cases, the unjust taxation system, the unfair pension system and the introduction of opium cultivation. He also criticized the discontinuation of the puja (Hindu worship) at the Kamakhya Temple, which according to him resulted in calamities. Maniram further wrote that the "objectionable treatment" of the Hill Tribes (such as the Nagas) was resulting in constant warfare leading to mutual loss of life and money. He complained against the desecration of the Ahom royal tombs and looting of wealth from these relics. He also disapproved of the appointment of the Marwaris and the Bengalis as Mouzadars (a civil service post), when a number of Assamese people remained unemployed.

As a solution to all these issues, Maniram proposed that the former native administration of the Ahom kings be reintroduced. The judge Mills dismissed the petition as a "curious document" from "a discontended [sic] subject". He also remarked that Maniram was "a clever but an untrustworthy and intriguing person". To gather support for the reintroduction of the Ahom rule, Maniram arrived in Calcutta, the then capital of British India, in April 1857, and networked with several influential people. On behalf of the Ahom royal Kandarpeswar Singha, he petitioned the British administrators for restoration of the Ahom rule on 6 May 1857.

When the Indian sepoys started an uprising against the British on 10 May, Maniram saw it as an opportunity to restore the Ahom rule. With help from messengers disguised as fakirs, he sent coded letters to Piyali Baruah, who had been acting as the chief advisor of Kandarpeswar in his absence. In these letters, he urged Kandarpeswar Singha to launch a rebellion against the British, with help from the sepoys at Dibrugarh and Golaghat. Kandarpeswar and his loyal men hatched an anti-British plot and gathered arms. The plot was supported by several influential local leaders including Urbidhar Barua, Mayaram Barbora, Chitrasen Barbora, Kamala Charingia Barua, Mahidhar Sarma Muktear, Luki Senchowa Barua, Ugrasen Marangikhowa Gohain, Deoram Dihingia Barua, Dutiram Barua, Bahadur Gaon Burha, Sheikh Formud Ali and Madhuram Koch.

The conspirators were joined by the Subedars Sheikh Bhikun and Nur Mahammad, after Kandarpeswar promised to double the salary of the sepoys if they succeeded in defeating the British. On 29 August 1857, the rebels met at Sheikh Bhikun's residence at Nogora. They planned a march to Jorhat, where Kandarpeswar would be installed as the King on the day of the Durga Puja; later Sivasagar and Dibrugarh would be captured. However, the plot was uncovered before it could be executed. Kandarpeswar, Maniram, and other leaders were arrested.

Maniram was arrested in Calcutta, detained in Alipur for a few weeks, and then brought to Jorhat. His letters to Kandarpeswar had been intercepted by the Special Commissioner Captain Charles Holroyd, who judged the trial. Based on the statement of Haranath Parbatia Baruah, the daroga (inspector) of Sivasagar, Maniram was identified as the kingpin of the plot. He and Piyali Barua were publicly hanged on 26 February 1858 at the Jorhat Central Jail. Maniram's death was widely mourned in Assam, and several tea garden workers struck work to express their support for the rebellion. The executions led to resentment among the public, resulting in an open rebellion which was suppressed forcefully.

== Legacy ==
After his death, Maniram's tea estates were sold to George Williamson in an auction. Several folk songs, known as the "Maniram Dewanar Geet", were composed in his memory. The Maniram Dewan Trade Centre of Guwahati and the Maniram Dewan Boys' Hostel of the Dibrugarh University is named after him. In 2012, the Planning Commission Deputy Chairman Montek Singh Ahluwalia announced that he planned to declare tea as the national drink of India to coincide with the 212th birth anniversary of Maniram Dewan.
