= Barhat =

Human settlement in India

Barhat is a village in Palasi, Araria district of Bihar in India. The location of the village is 1 kilometre (0.62 mi) south of Palasi and 30 kilometres (19 mi) south-east of Araria. The majority of its residents are of the Kulhaiya ethnicity and speak Kulhaiya boli. Though the villagers were to be illiterate, but these days they are pursuing higher studies.

Some of the population are ironsmiths who work daily for their livelihood, and are paid in grain. The majority of the population of the village is engaged in small scale cultivation, and a big group in daily basis works. The commercial crops cultivated mean that the village's economical status is poor. Eidgah in the block Palasi lies in the village Barhat and Maulana Salim Zafar Qasmi is the chief speaker of the Eid Gah. The village is popular because of a big Jama Masjid, Barhat at Barhat Chowk.
