= Kulhaiya =

Muslim community in India

Kulhaiya •Sheikh community کلاحیا
Total population
- Unknown

Regions with significant populations
- India • Nepal
- Bihar: 1,253,781 (2023)
- Terai: Unknown

Languages
- Kulhaiya boli (کلاحیا بولی) a dialect of Maithili

Religion
- Sunni Islam

The Kulhaiya (Urdu: کل حیا) is a Muslim tribal community Sheikh of Bihar, also known as Al-Akhdam, found in the northeastern part of the Indian state of Bihar, and the Terai region of south-east Nepal.

== History ==
=== Origin ===
Founding members of the Kulahiya Sheikh community were preferred for soldiers in the Bengal Sultanate due to their mercenary background. The Faujdars of Purnea at the time of the Mughal Nawab of Bengal, Saif Khan, appointed Kulahiyas to protect Indian border on the side of Nepal against the invading Gurung and Gurkha tribes. The original members of this community were Arab mercenaries and sellswords from Hadhrami tribe of Yemen.

== Education ==
According to the 2011 Census, male literacy rate of the community is 66% and 55.6% for female. The community is categorised as OBC under education quota system.

== Demographics ==
The Kulhaiyas are predominantly found in erstwhile sultanate-era Purnia division of Bihar which includes present-day districts of Purnia, Araria, Katihar and some parts of Kishanganj of Indian state of Bihar.
