= Wildlife of Kerala =

Overview of the wildlife in the Indian state of Kerala

Kerala forest divisions

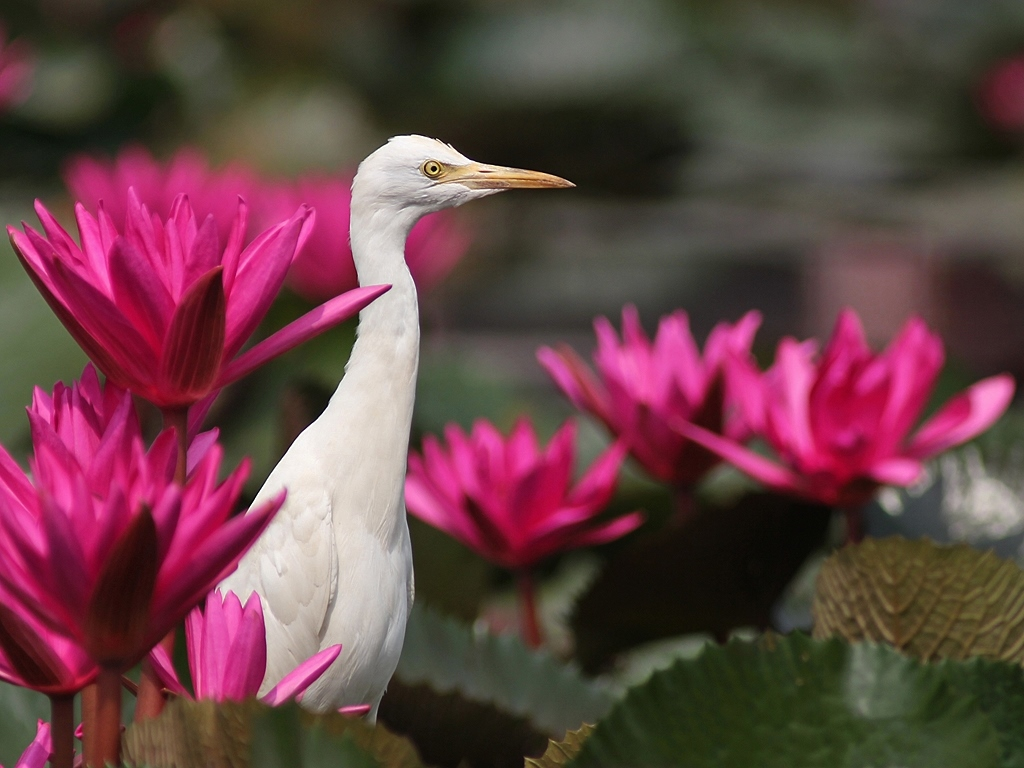
Cattle egret at the Chirakkal Chira, Chirakkal, Kannur

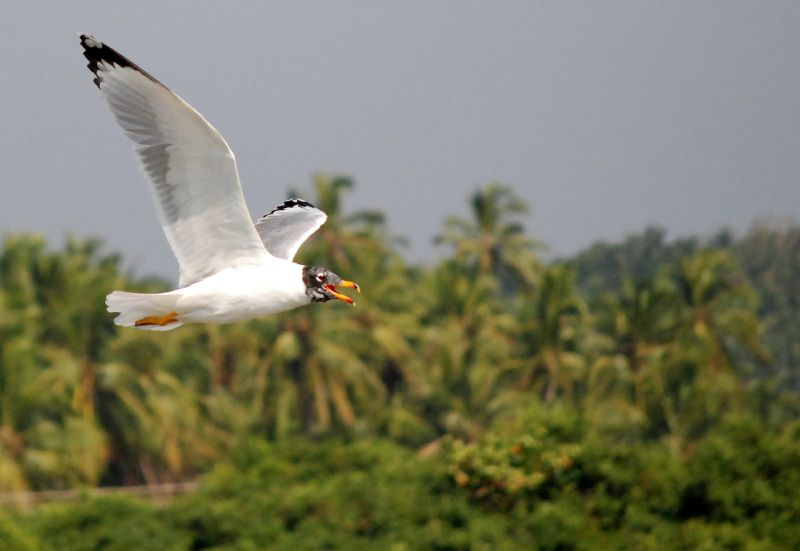
A migratory bird at Kadalundi Bird Sanctuary

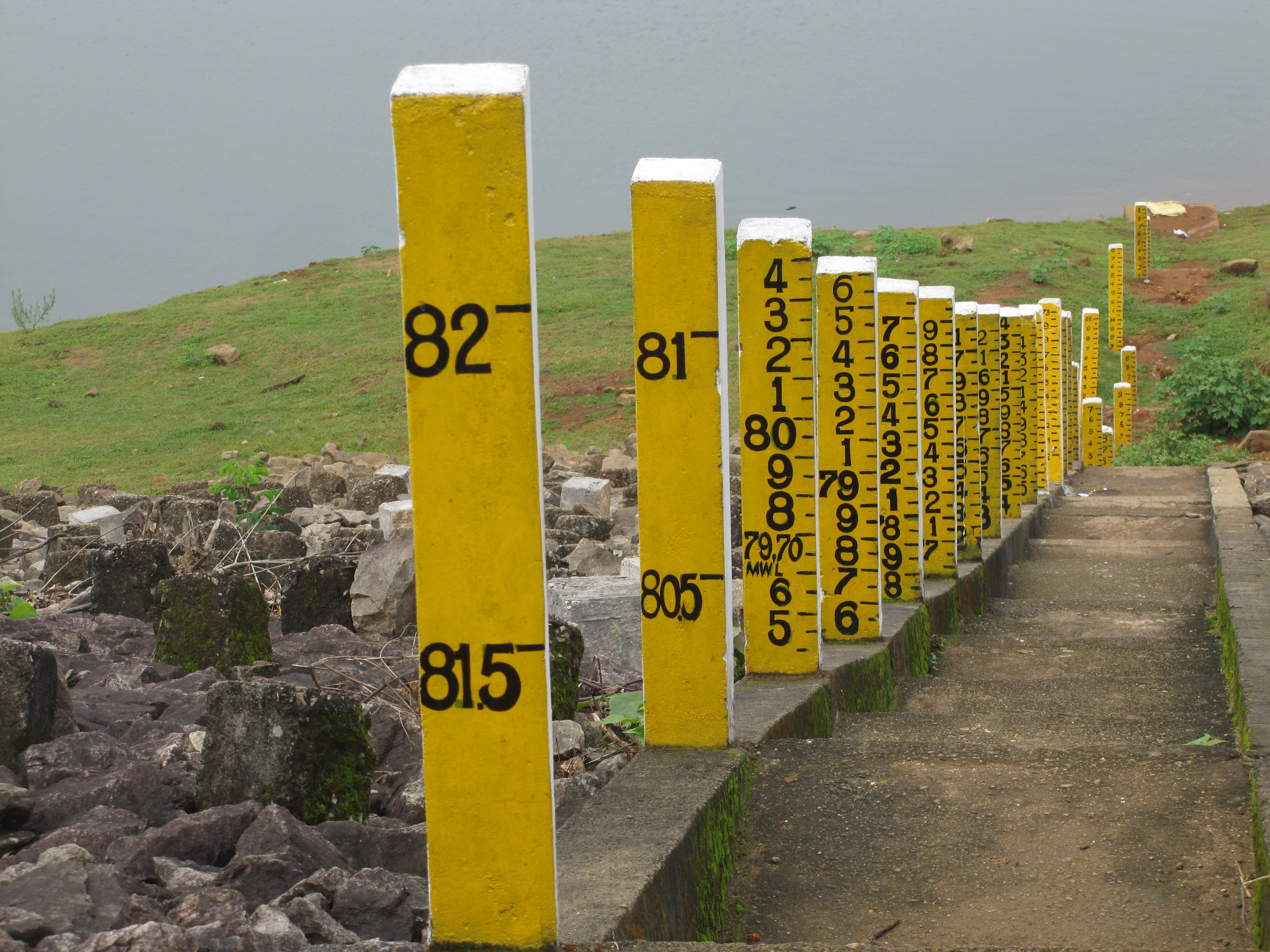
Chimmini Wildlife Sanctuary

Most of Kerala's native habitat, which consists of wet evergreen rainforests at lower elevations and highland deciduous and semi-evergreen forests in the east, has a humid tropical climate. However, significant variations in terrain and elevation lead to high biodiversity. But Alappuzha district has no forests.

== Evergreen forests ==
Most of Kerala's significantly biodiverse tracts of wilderness lie in the evergreen forests of its easternmost districts; coastal Kerala (along with portions of the east) mostly lies under cultivation and is home to comparatively little wildlife. Despite this, Kerala contains 9,400 km^{2} of natural forests. Out of the approximately 7,500 km^{2} of non-plantation forest cover, there are wild regions of tropical wet evergreen and semi-evergreen forests (lower and middle elevations — 3,470 km^{2}), tropical moist and dry deciduous forests (mid-elevations — 4,100 km^{2} and 100 km^{2}, respectively), and montane subtropical and temperate (shola) forests (highest elevations — 100 km^{2}). Such forests together cover 24% of Kerala's landmass. Kerala also hosts four of the world's Ramsar Convention-listed wetlands: Ashtamudi Lake, Lake Sasthamkotta, Thrissur-Ponnani Kole Wetlands, and the Vembanad-Kol wetlands are noted as being wetlands of international importance. There are also numerous protected conservation areas, including 1455.4 km^{2} of the vast Nilgiri Biosphere Reserve and 1828 km^{2} of the Agasthyamala Biosphere Reserve. Parambikulam forest in Palakkad district is one of the jungle regions in Kerala.

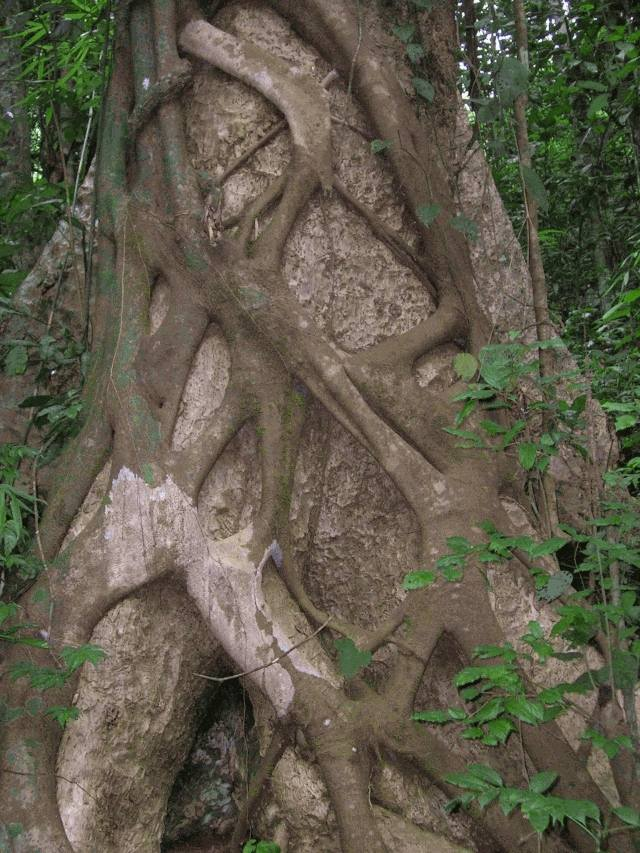
Figs (Ficus species) like this strangler fig are an important floral element and support many frugivores

== Flora ==
Vegetation types

Eastern Kerala's windward mountains shelter tropical moist forests and tropical dry forests which are generally characteristic of the wider Western Ghats: crowns of giant sonokeling (binomial nomenclature: Dalbergia latifolia — Indian rosewood), anjili (Artocarpus hirsuta), mullumurikku (Erythrina), Cassia, and other trees dominate the canopies of large tracts of virgin forest. Overall, Kerala's forests are home to more than 1,000 species of trees. Smaller flora include bamboo, wild black pepper (Piper nigrum), wild cardamom, the calamus rattan palm (Calamus rotang — a type of giant grass), and aromatic vetiver grass (Vetiveria zizanioides). The world's oldest teak plantation, Conolly's Plot, is in Nilambur.

== Fauna ==
In turn, the forests play host to such major fauna as the Asian elephant (Elephas maximus), Bengal tiger (Panthera tigris tigris), leopard (Panthera pardus), Nilgiri tahr (Nilgiritragus hylocrius), and grizzled giant squirrel (Ratufa macroura). More remote preserves, including Silent Valley National Park in the Kundali Hills, harbour endangered species such as the Lion-tailed macaque (Macaca silenus), Indian sloth bear (Melursus (Ursus) ursinus ursinus), and gaur (the so-called "Indian bison" — Bos gaurus). More common species include the Indian porcupine (Hystrix indica), chital (Axis axis), sambar (Cervus unicolor), gray langur, flying squirrel, swamp lynx (Felis chaus kutas), boar (Sus scrofa), a variety of catarrhine Old World monkey species, the dhole, and the Asian palm civet (Paradoxurus hermaphroditus).

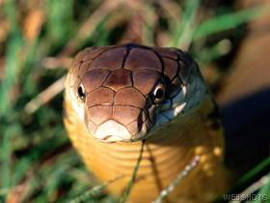
The king cobra (Ophiophagus hannah)

Many reptiles, such as the tree snake, green snake, king cobra, viper, python, and various turtles and crocodiles are to be found in Kerala — again, disproportionately in the east. Kerala has about 453 species of birds such as the Sri Lanka frogmouth (Batrachostomus moniliger), leaf picking bird, Oriental bay owl, large frugivores like the great hornbill (Buceros bicornis) and Indian grey hornbill, as well as the more widespread birds such as peafowl, Indian cormorant, jungle and hill mynas, the Oriental darter, black-hooded oriole, greater racket-tailed and black drongoes, bulbul (Pycnonotidae), species of kingfisher and woodpecker, jungle fowl, Alexandrine parakeets, and assorted ducks and migratory birds. Additionally, freshwater fish such as kadu (stinging catfish) and brackishwater species such as choottachi (orange chromide — Etroplus maculatus; valued as an aquarium specimen) are native to Kerala's lakes and waterways.

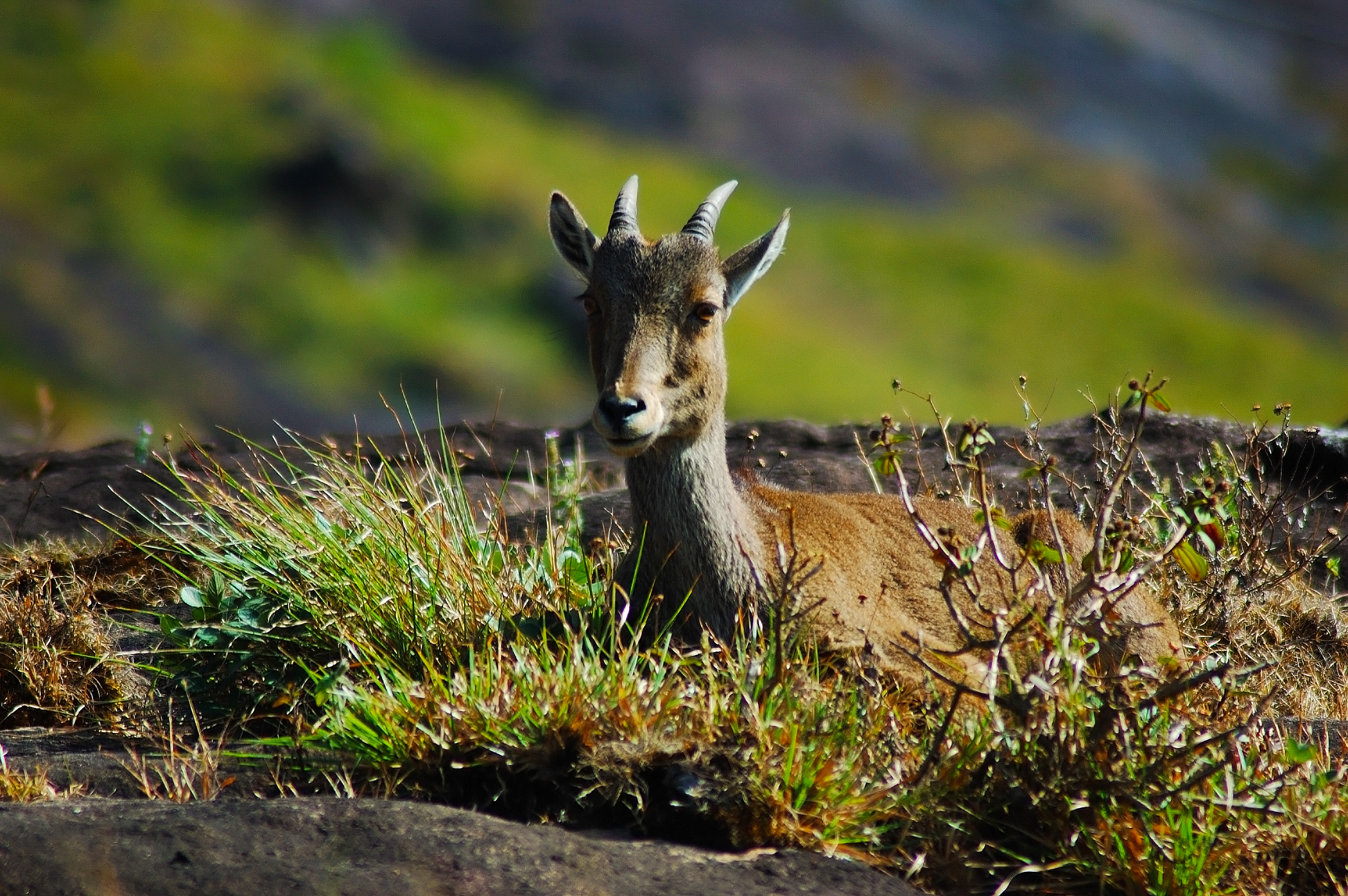
The Nilgiri tahr, spotted in the Eravikulam National Park in Idukki district

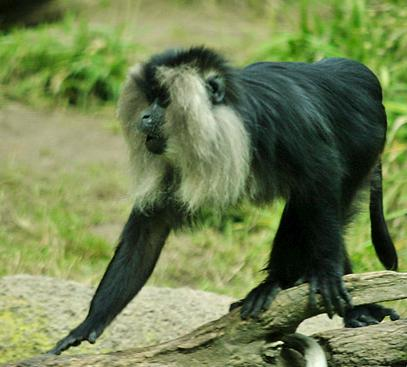
Lion-tailed macaque

== Parks, reserves and sanctuaries ==
National park	Area (km^{2})	Year started
Eravikulam National Park	97	1978
Silent Valley National Park	237. 52	1984
Anamudi Shola National Park	7.5	2003
Mathikettan Shola National Park	12.817	2003
Pambadum Shola National Park	1.318	2003

Biosphere reserve	Area (km^{2})	Year started
Nilgiri Biosphere Reserve	1455.4	1986
Agasthyamala Biosphere Reserve	1828	2001

Wildlife sanctuary	Area (km^{2})	Year started
Periyar Wildlife Sanctuary	925	1950
Neyyar Wildlife Sanctuary	128	1958
Peechi-Vazhani Wildlife Sanctuary	125	1958
Wayanad Wildlife Sanctuary	344.44	1973
Parambikulam Wildlife Sanctuary	286	1973
Idukki Wildlife Sanctuary	70	1976
Peppara Wildlife Sanctuary	53	1983
Chimmini Wildlife Sanctuary	85	1984
Chinnar Wildlife Sanctuary	90.44	1984
Shendurney Wildlife Sanctuary	171	1984
Aralam Wildlife Sanctuary	55	1984
Kurinjimala Sanctuary	32	2006
Malabar Wildlife Sanctuary	74.21	2009
Kottiyoor Wildlife Sanctuary	30.38	2011
Karimpuzha Wildlife Sanctuary	227.97	2020

Bird sanctuary	Area (km^{2})	Year started
Thattekad Bird Sanctuary	25	1983
Mangalavanam Bird Sanctuary	0.0274	2004
Chulanur Bird Sanctuary	3.42	2007
Kumarakom Bird Sanctuary	0.0566	

Tiger reserve	Area (km^{2})	Year started
Periyar Tiger Reserve	925	1978
Parambikulam Tiger Reserve	648.50	1973

Community reserve	Area (km^{2})	Year started
Kadalundi Bird Sanctuary	1.5	2007

== See also ==
- List of Odonata of Kerala
- List of butterflies of Kerala
- List of amphibians of Kerala
- List of reptiles of Kerala
- List of birds of Kerala
- List of mammals of Kerala

== Notes ==
- Idukki district has the most forest land in Kerala while Alappuzha has none.
