= Vattavada =

- Village
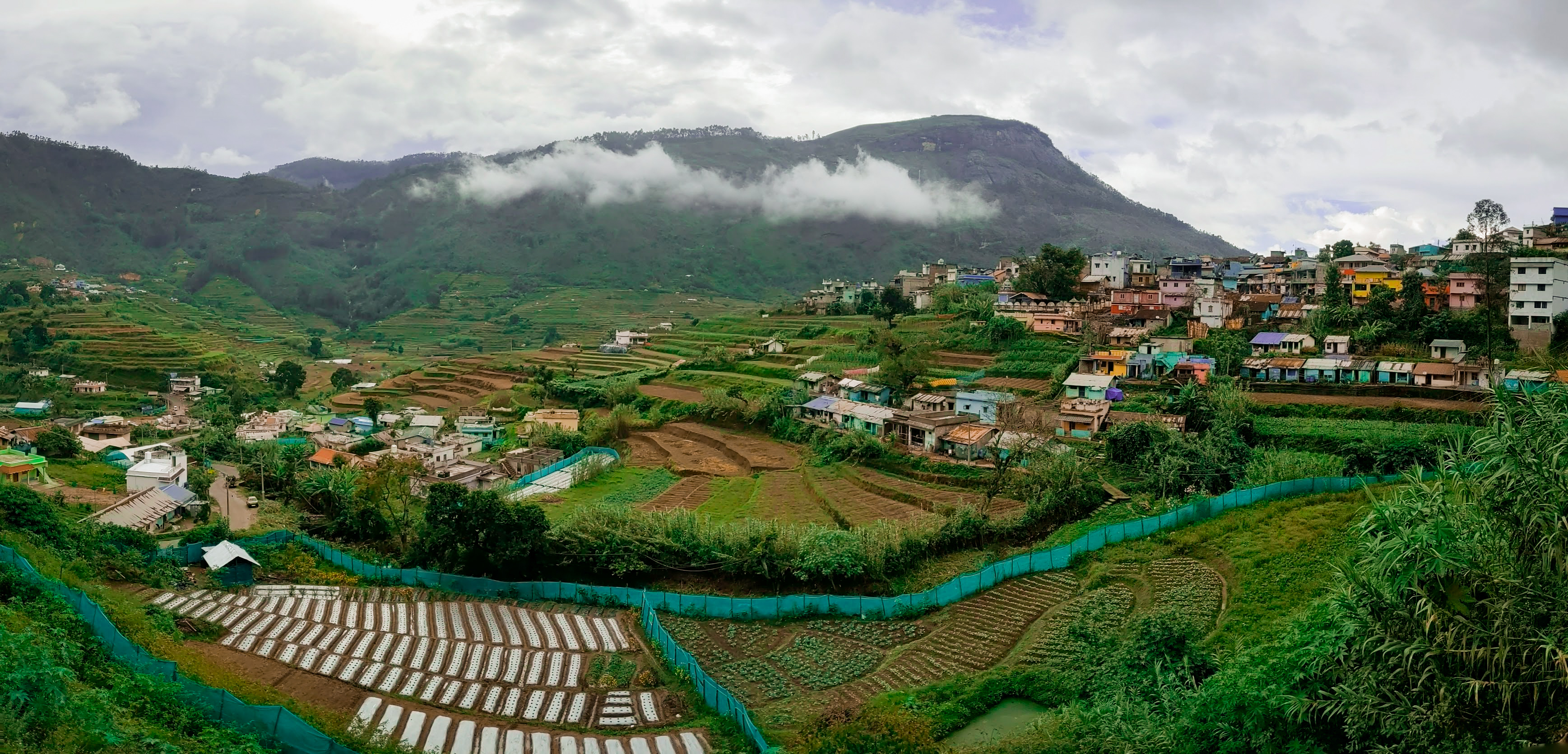
- Farmlands at Vattavada village

- Location in Kerala, India
- Coordinates: 10°11′0″N 77°15′24″E
- Country: India
- State: Kerala
- District: Idukki
- Taluk: Devikulam

Area
  - Total: 31.78 km^{2} (12.27 sq mi)
- Elevation: 1,659 m (5,443 ft)

Population (2011)
  - Total: 3,292
  - Density: 103.6/km^{2} (268.3/sq mi)

Languages
  - Official: Malayalam, English
  - Regional: Tamil,Malayalam
- Time zone: UTC+5:30 (IST)
- PIN: 685615
- Telephone code: 04865
- Vehicle registration: KL-68
- Sex ratio: 955:1000 ♂/♀
- Literacy: 78%
- Climate: heavy cool (Köppen)

Vattavada is a village in Idukki district in the state of Kerala, bordering Tamil Nadu, India. The village is located along Palani Hills in Western Ghats. It is an agricultural village known for growing a wide range of vegetables and fruits in the terrace farmlands.

== Demographics ==
As of 2011 Census, Vattavada had a population of 3,292 with 1,690 males and 1,602 females. Vattavada village has an area of 31.78 km^{2} (12.27 sq mi) with 901 families residing in it. In Vattavada, 12% of the population was under 6 years of age. Vattavada had an average literacy of 75.7% higher than the national average of 74% and lower than state average of 94%.

== Geography and climate ==
Vattavada is a virtually rain shadow village, lying in the eastern side of the Western Ghats near to Marayur and north side of Munnar. The region in and around Vattavada varies in height from 1,450 meters (4,760 ft) to 2,695 meters (8,842 ft) above mean sea level. Vattavada enjoys a salubrious climate. The temperature ranges between 5 °C (41 °F) and 20 °C (68 °F) in winter and 12 °C (54 °F) and 18 °C (64 °F) in summer. Temperatures as low as −4 °C (25 °F) have been recorded in the border region of Vattavada. The mean maximum daily temperature is at its lowest during the monsoon months with the highest temperature being 19 °C (66 °F).

== Crops ==
Vattavada is known as the market of Kerala, because they are in front of vegetable producing. Vattavada is famous for its wide variety of crops which is not seen on the other parts of Kerala, which includes varieties of apples, oranges, strawberries, guavas, pears, blackberries, plums, gooseberries, canistels, peaches and passion fruits, etc. Vattavada was also famous for cultivating wheat. But as the water content in the soil became less over the years due to large-scale cultivation of Eucalyptus, wheat cultivation has reduced significantly.

== Flora and fauna ==
Most of the native flora and fauna of Vattavada have disappeared due to severe habitat fragmentation resultant from the creation of the plantations. However, some species continue to survive and thrive in several protected areas nearby, including the new Kurinjimala Sanctuary to the east, the Chinnar Wildlife Sanctuary, Manjampatti Valley and the Amaravati reserve forest of Indira Gandhi Wildlife Sanctuary to the north east, the Eravikulam National Park and Anamudi Shola National Park to the north, the Pampadum Shola National Park to the south and the proposed Palani Hills National Park to the east. These protected areas are especially known for several threatened and endemic species including Nilgiri tahr, the grizzled giant squirrel, the Nilgiri wood-pigeon, elephant, the gaur, the Nilgiri langur, the sambar, and the neelakurinji (that blossoms only once in twelve years) and special thing is it center for Munnar, Kodaikanal and Marayur

== Major Social and Political Events ==
On July 2, 2018, Abhimanyu belonging to Vattavada who was pursuing graduation in Maharajas College, Ernakulam was murdered by Campus Front of India activists over political rivalry.

== Gallery ==
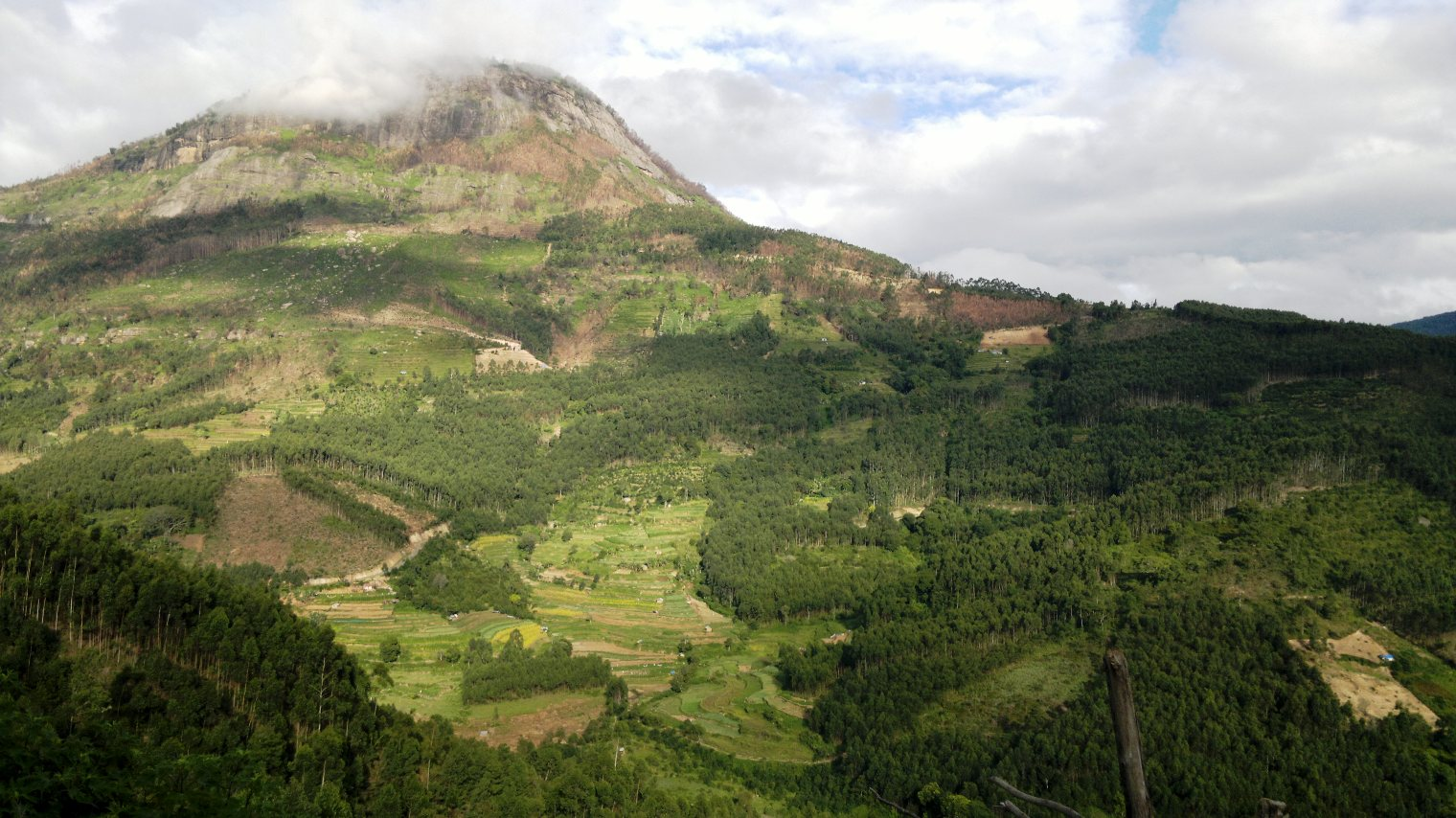
Prominent mountain
