= List of protected areas of Kerala =

The protected areas of Kerala include a wide range of biomes, extending east from the coral reefs, estuaries, salt marshes, mangroves beaches of the Arabian Sea through the tropical moist broadleaf forests of the Malabar Coast moist forests to the North Western Ghats moist deciduous forests and South Western Ghats moist deciduous forests to South Western Ghats montane rain forests on the western border of Tamil Nadu in the Western Ghats. Most protected areas throughout its 14 districts are under the stewardship of the Kerala Forest Department and like all other protected areas of India receive support from the Ministry of Environment and Forests (India).

National Parks of Kerala

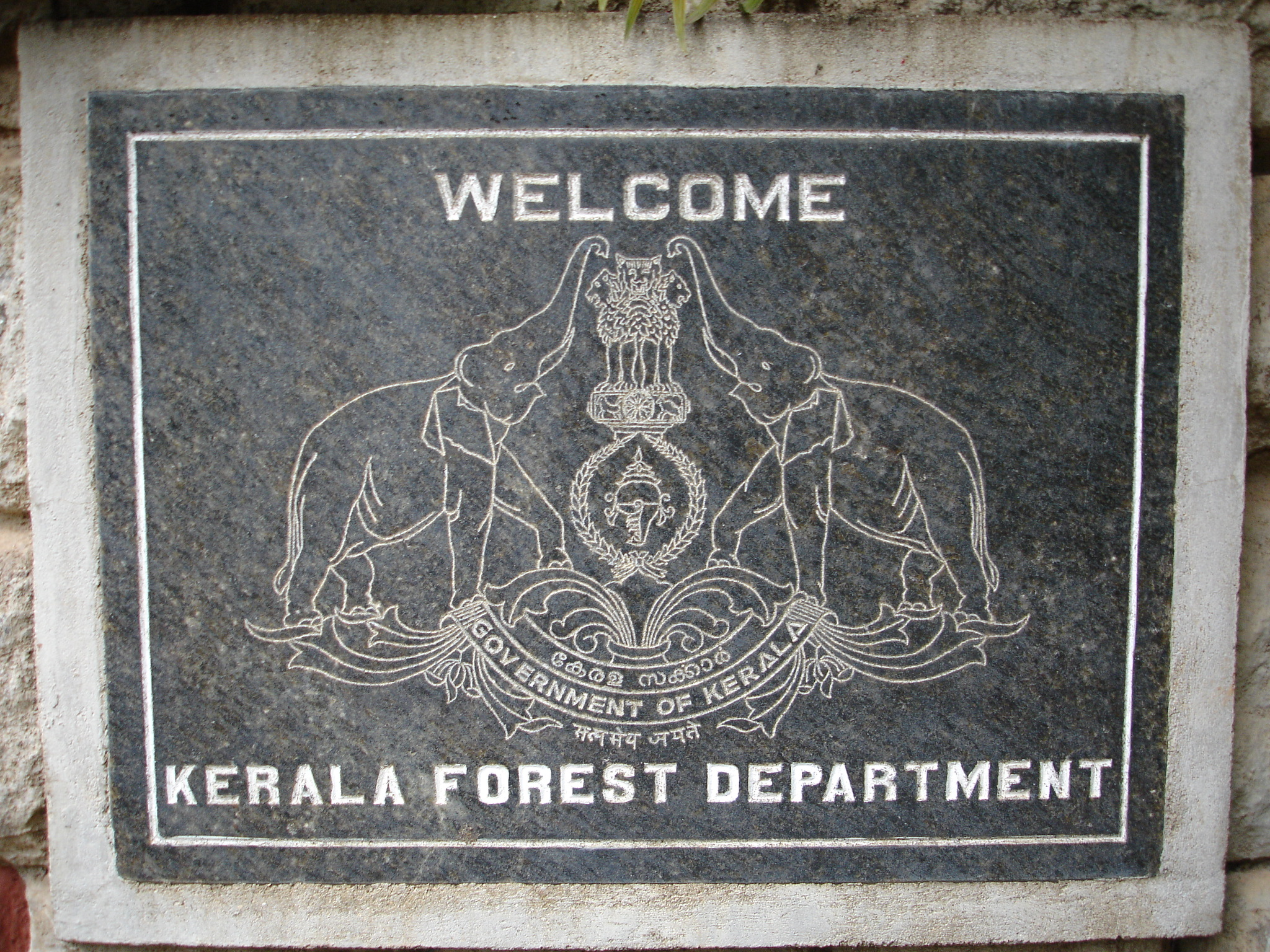

Welcome to the Protected Areas of Kerala

== Land coverage ==
The state of Kerala covers an area of 38,863 km^{2} (15,005 sq mi).

- The total forest area in the state is 10,336 km^{2} (3,991 sq mi) (1995), forming 27.83% of the total geographic area.
- There are six national parks with a total area of 558.16 km^{2} (215.51 sq mi).
- There are fourteen wildlife sanctuaries with a total area of 1,891.07 km^{2} (730.15 sq mi).
- Together the protected area totals 2,449.23 km^{2} (945.65 sq mi), which cover 23.7% of the total forest area and 6.3% of the geographical area of Kerala State.

== History ==
The first official action towards the conservation of wildlife and biodiversity in Kerala was taken in 1934 by the Maharaja of the Princely state of Travancore, Chithira Thirunal Balarama Varma, by declaring the forests around Periyar lake as a private game reserve to stop the encroachment of tea plantations. It was named Nellikkampatty Game Reserve and was consolidated as a wildlife sanctuary in 1950 after the political integration of India.

== Biosphere reserves ==
1. Nilgiri Biosphere Reserve (5,520 km^{2}) established in 1986, includes parts of Wayanad, Malappuram & Palakkad districts of Kerala and parts of Tamil Nadu & Karnataka.

2. Agasthyamalai Biosphere Reserve (3,500 km^{2}) established in 2001, covers parts of Thiruvananthapuram, Kollam and Pathanamthitta Districts in Kerala and Tirunelveli and Kanyakumari Districts in Tamil Nadu.

== National parks ==
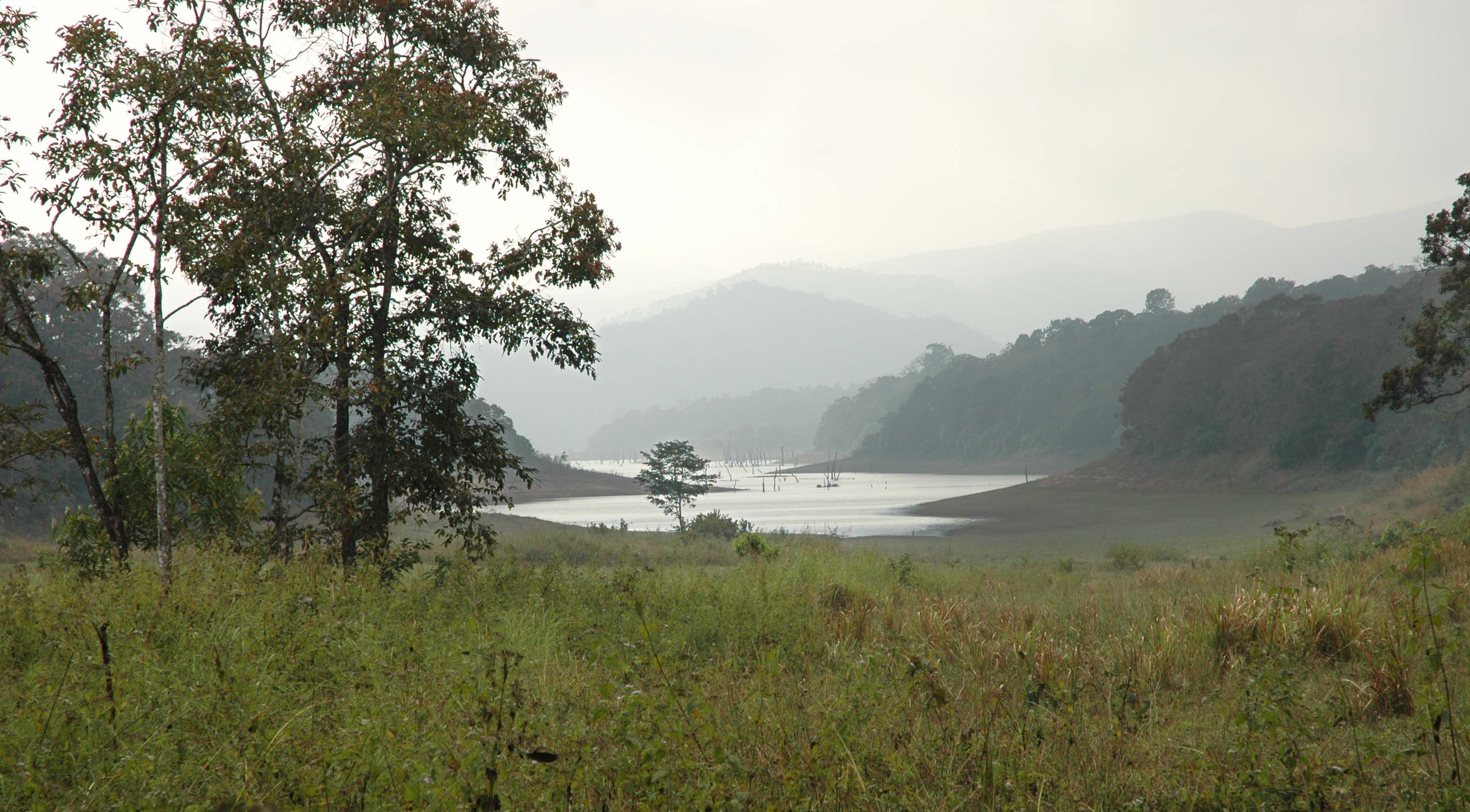
Periyar National Park

1978 Eravikulam NP, Idukki District, 97 km^{2}

1982 Periyar NP, Idukki District, 350 km^{2}

1984 Silent Valley NP, Palakkad District, 89.52 km^{2}

2003 Mathikettan Shola NP, Idukki District, 12.82 km^{2}

2003 Anamudi Shola NP in Idukki District, 7.5 km^{2}.

2003 Pambadum Shola NP, Idukki District, 1.318 km^{2.}

== Wildlife sanctuaries ==
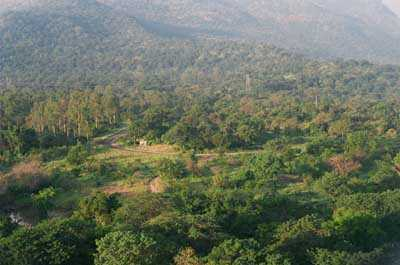
Chinnar Wildlife Sanctuary

Wildlife sanctuaries in Kerala include:

- Neyyar WLS in Thiruvananthapuram District, 128 km^{2} (49 sq mi)in 1958.
- Peechi-Vazhani WLS in Thrissur District, 125 km^{2} (48 sq mi), in 1958
- Wayanad WLS in Wayanad District, 344.44 km^{2} (132.99 sq mi) in 1973.
- Idukki WLS in Idukki District, 70 km^{2} (27 sq mi)n 1976.
- Peppara WLS in Thiruvananthapuram District, 53 km^{2} (20 sq mi), in 1983.
- Thattekad BS in Ernakulam District, 25.16 km^{2} (9.71 sq mi), in 1983.
- Chimmony WLS in Thrissur District, 85 km^{2} (33 sq mi), in 1984.
- Shenduruny WLS in Kollam District, 171 km^{2} (66 sq mi), in 1984.
- Chinnar WLS in Idukki District, 90.44 km^{2} (34.92 sq mi), in 1984.
- Aralam WLS in Kannur District, 55 km^{2} (21 sq mi), in 1984.
- Mangalavanam BS in Ernakulam District, 0.0274 km^{2} (0.0106 sq mi), in 2004
- Kurinjimala Sanctuary in Idukki District, 32 km^{2} (12 sq mi), in 2006.
- Karimpuzha WLS in Malappuram district, 227.97 km^{2}, in 2020.

== Tiger reserves ==
1. Periyar Tiger Reserve (PTR) in Idukki district is adjacent/within the Periyar National Park, in 1978.
2. Parambikulam Tiger Reserve (PKTR) in Palakkad district, in 2009.

== Zoos ==
- The Thiruvananthapuram Zoo is one among the best designed in Asia and is set amidst a woodland, lakes and lawns. It is one of the oldest in the country, established as an annexe to the museum in 1857.
- The Thrissur Zoo is home to the wide variety of animals, reptiles and birds. Spread over an area of 13.5 acres of land, a natural history museum and an art museum are also enclosed within the same premises showcasing the socio-cultural heritage of the region. There is a special building which houses snakes also.

== Reserve forests ==
- Attappadi - The 249 km^{2} Attappadi Reserve Forest is an informal buffer zone conjoining Silent Valley National Park to the West. 81 km^{2} of this forest was separated to become most of the new 94 km^{2} Bhavani Forest Range which is part of the 147.22 km^{2} Silent Valley Buffer Zone.
- Idamalayar Reserve Forest- surrounding the Edamalayar Dam to the north, east and a south-east, covering Thrissur and Ernakulam districts. Eravikulam National Park is to the south-east, and Mankulam Forest Division to the east.
- A useful source is detailed Topographic Maps of India.

== See also ==
- Protected areas of West Bengal
- Protected areas of Himachal Pradesh
- Protected areas of Tamil Nadu
