= Vandaravu =

Mountain in Tamil Nadu, India

Coordinates: 10.149°N 77.273°E

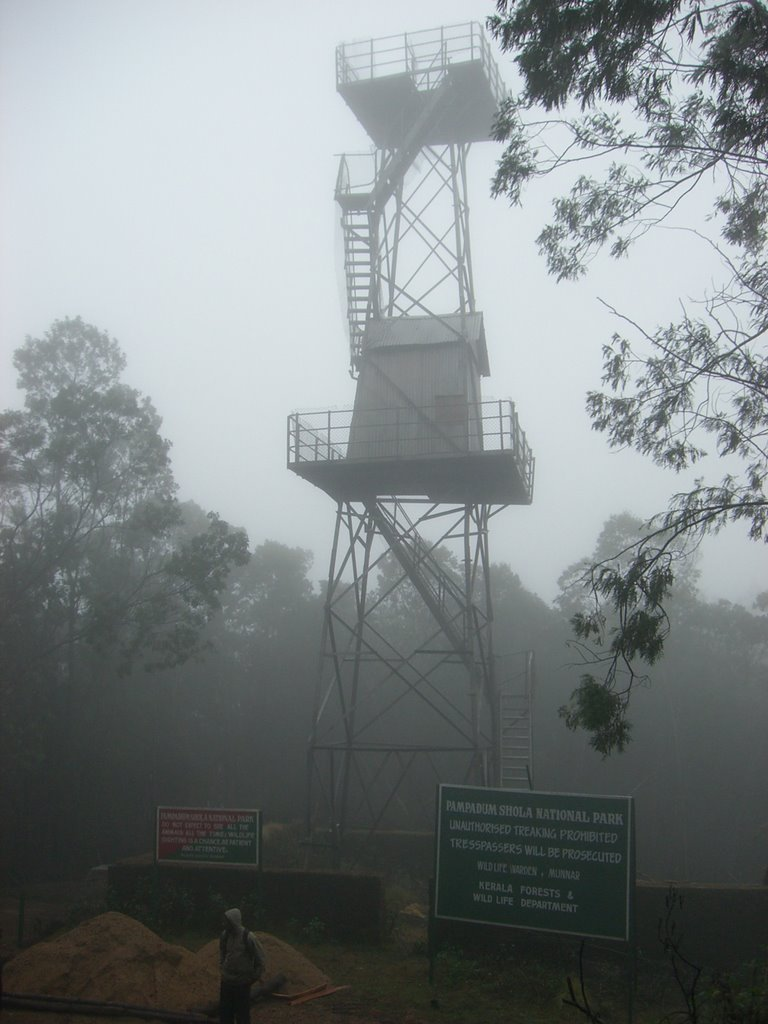
An observation tower in Vandavaru

Vandaravu (Tamil: வண்டறாவு) is the highest peak in the Palani hills (Western Ghats) in Tamil Nadu, India.

It shares border between Devikulam taluk in Idukki district and Kodaikanal taluk in Dindigul district.

It is situated in the western edge of upper Palani hills bordering Pambadum Shola National Park (Idukki) in Kerala.

It stands at a height of 2,533 m above sea level. It is the highest point in Dindigul district.

The trek to this peak is mesmerizing! The surrounding area of this peak is heavily forested in which wildlife can be seen frequently.

It has an older and higher motorable road in South India from Munnar Top Station to Kodaikanal. One can reach this station by a taking a taxi from nearby Town of Munnar.

Other prominent peaks are Vembadi shola (2,505m) and Karumkadu (2,150m).
