= Lakkom Falls =

Waterfall in Kerala, India

Coordinates: 10°11′20″N 77°6′40″E

Lakkom Water Falls

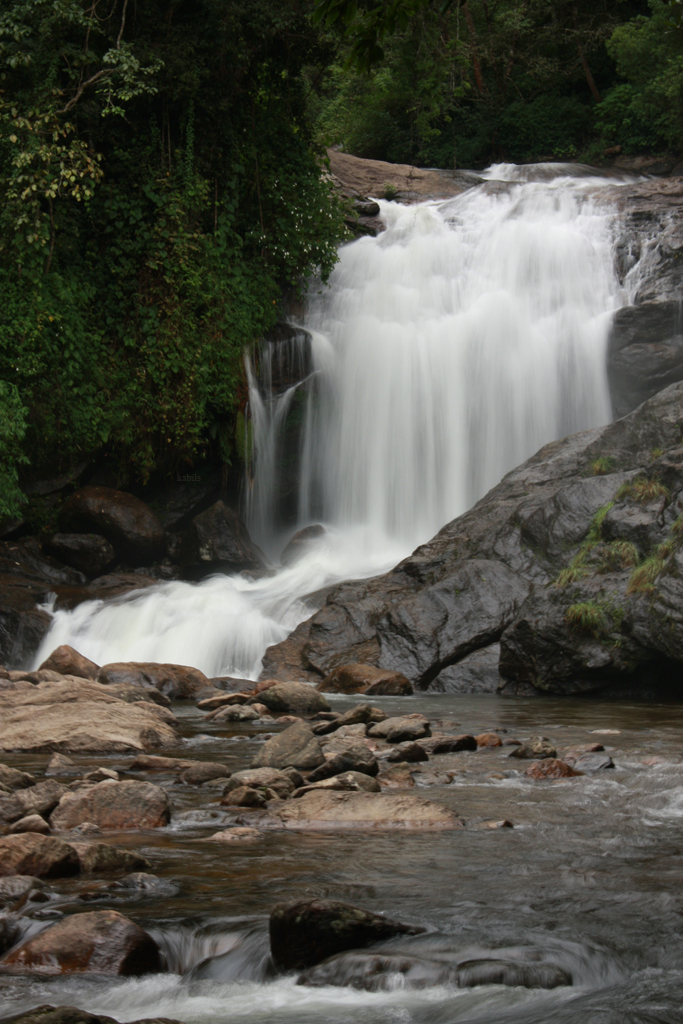
Lukkam waterfalls, Munnar, kerala. June 2008.

Lakkom Water Falls, also known as Lakkam Waterfalls, is a tourist attraction located near Marayoor in the Idukki district of Kerala. These falls are part of the Eravikulam stream, which is a part of Eravikulam National Park and is one of the major tributaries of the Pambar River.

== Reaching there ==
Situated at about 25 km from Munnar, Lakkom Waterfalls is on the way to Udumalaipettai from Munnar. One can either catch a bus to Udumalaipettai or hire a local taxi from Munnar to reach here. It is on State Highway 17.

== Other details ==
Visiting time at Lakkom Waterfalls is from 8:00 am to 5:00 pm and visitors have to pay an entrance fees of ₹20. There are no separate fees for DSLR cameras.

There is also a guided trekking programme available at Lakkom Waterfalls for an amount of ₹100, and with this you can trek alongside the waterfalls.

== See also ==
- List of waterfalls
- List of waterfalls in India
