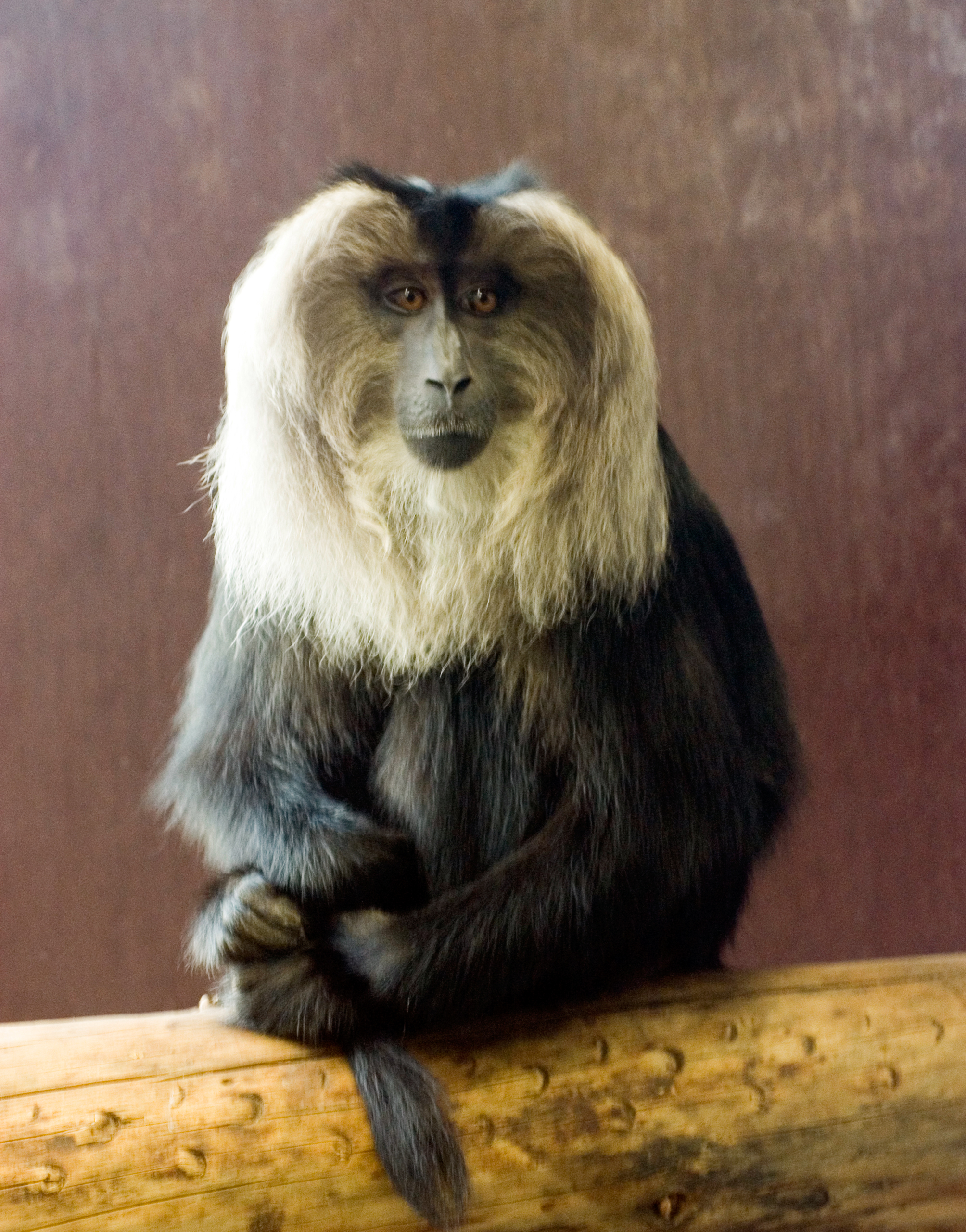
- Male at Bristol Zoo
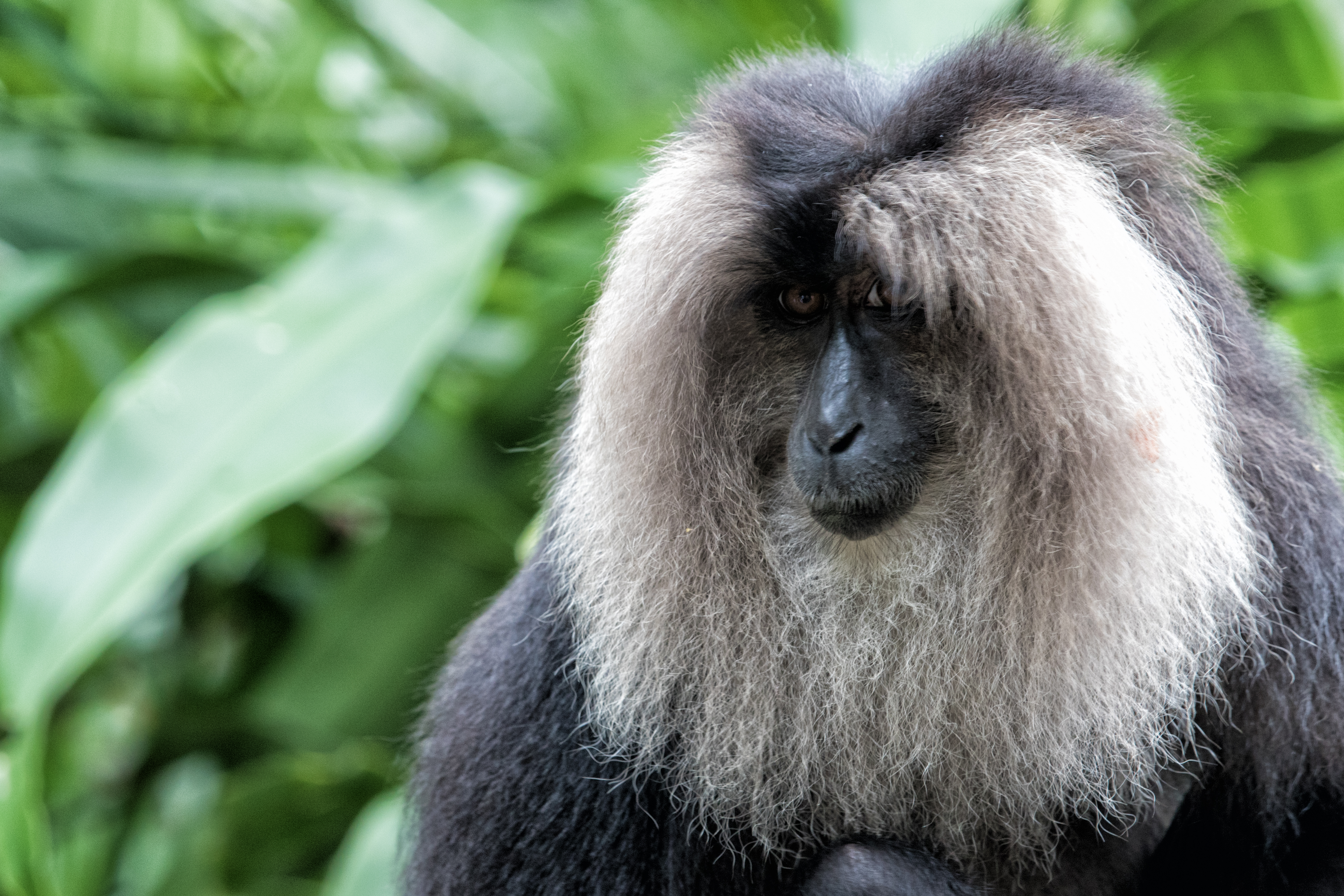
- Female at Singapore Zoo

Conservation status
- Endangered (IUCN 3.1)
- CITES Appendix I

Scientific classification
- Kingdom: Animalia
- Phylum: Chordata
- Class: Mammalia
- Order: Primates
- Family: Cercopithecidae
- Genus: Macaca
- Species: M. silenus

Binomial name
- Macaca silenus (Linnaeus, 1758)
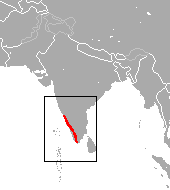
- native range

Synonyms
- Macaca albibarbatus (Kerr, 1792); Macaca ferox (Shaw, 1792); Macaca veter (Audebert, 1798); Macaca vetulus (Erxleben, 1777); Macaca silanus (F. Cuvier, 1822); Simia silenus Linnaeus, 1758

= Lion-tailed macaque =

Species of Old World monkey

The lion-tailed macaque (Macaca silenus), locally called wanderoo, is an Old World monkey endemic to the Western Ghats of South India.

== Characteristics ==
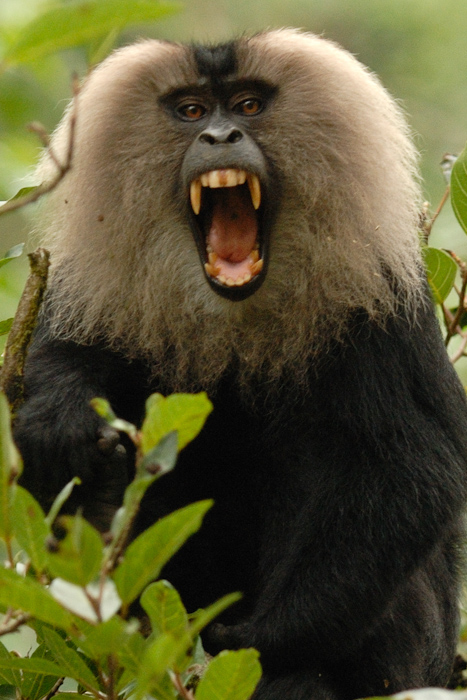
A male showing his canines

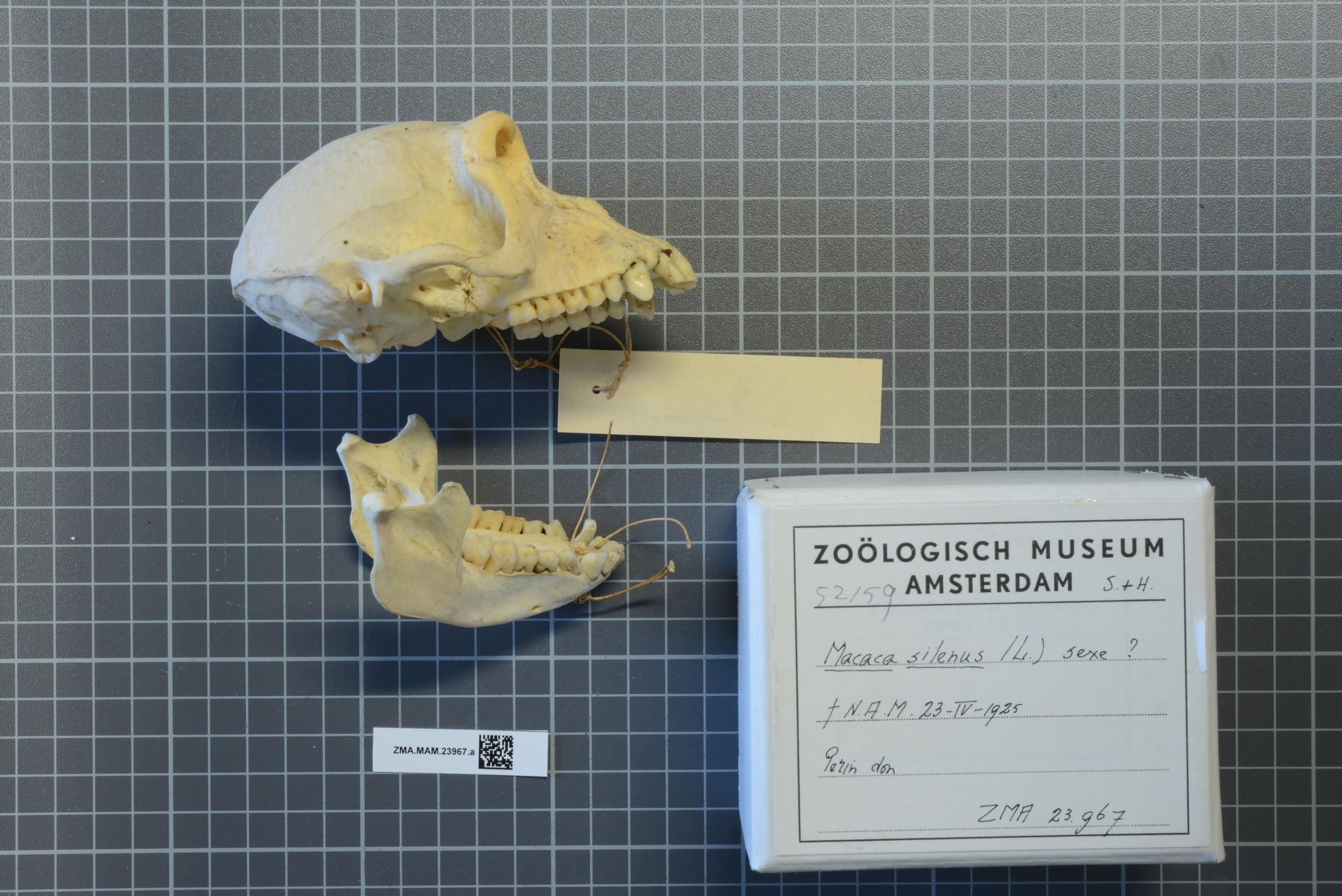
A skull preserved at the Naturalis Biodiversity Center in Leiden, Netherlands

Lion-tailed macaques are covered in black fur, and have a striking gray or silver mane that surrounds the face in both sexes. The face itself is hairless and black in adults, but pinkish in infants less than a year old. Infants are born with no mane, which begins to growth about two months after birth. They are named not for their mane, but for their tail, which is long, thin, and naked, with a lion-like, black tail tuft at the tip. The size of their tail is about 25 cm (9.8 in) in length. Their eyes are a shade of hazelnut with highlighting black eyelids.

Lion-tailed macaques, like other macaques, have deep cheek pouches used for storing food, and are quadrupedal with opposable digits. The mane that surrounds its face gives this monkey its German name Bartaffe – "beard ape". With a head-body length of 42–61 cm (17–24 in) and a weight of 2–10 kg (4.4–22.0 lb), it ranks among the smaller macaques species.

== Behavior and ecology ==
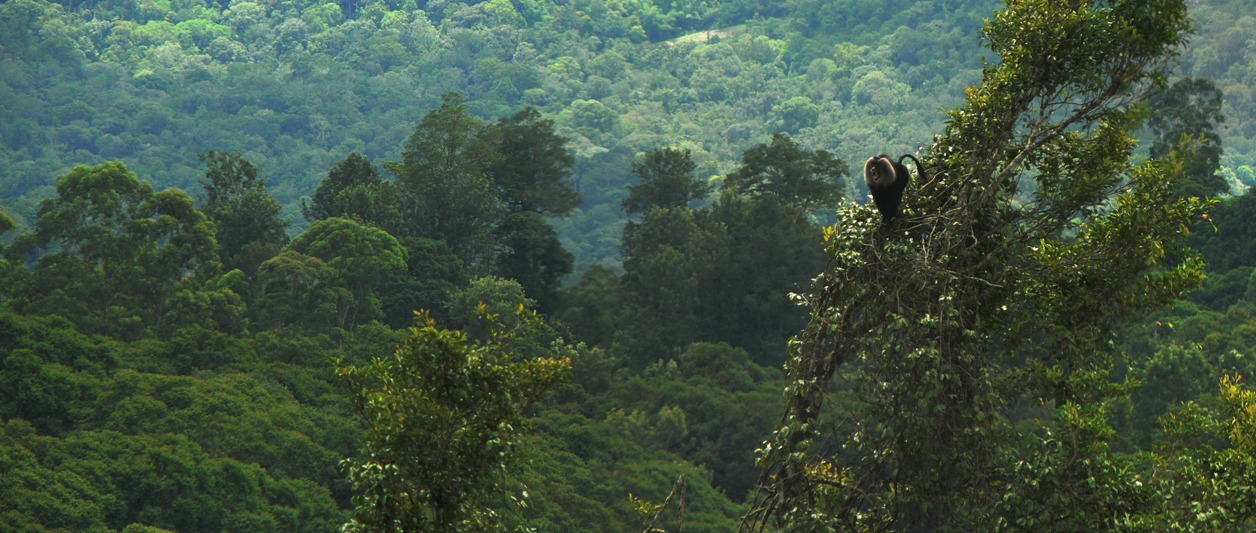
Lion-tailed macaque in the Anamalai Hills

The lion-tailed macaque is a rainforest dweller, often found in the upper canopy of tropical moist evergreen forests or monsoon forests. It is diurnal, meaning it is active exclusively in daylight hours. When active, they will spend half the day foraging, and the other half will be spent resting or finding new areas to forage. This species tends to avoid humans more than other macaques, however, habitat loss has led to increased habituation and conflict with humans.

In group behavior, the lion-tailed macaque is much like other macaques, living in hierarchical groups of usually 10 to 20 members, which usually consist of few males, typically 1–3 (including the dominant alpha), and many females. They have a polygynous mating system with no specific breeding season. While there is no specific breeding season, they tend to breed in the wet season, when resources are most abundant. Little time is spent grooming or playing with others in the group.

Lion-tailed macaques are a territorial animal, defending their area first with loud cries and bared teeth towards the invading troops. If this proves to be fruitless, it brawls aggressively, which can result in severe injuries due to lacerations from their large canines. Other forms of communication come in the form of mounting to show strength, branch shaking to scare off, lip-smacking as a friendly greeting, or yawning with a grimace to indicate dominance.

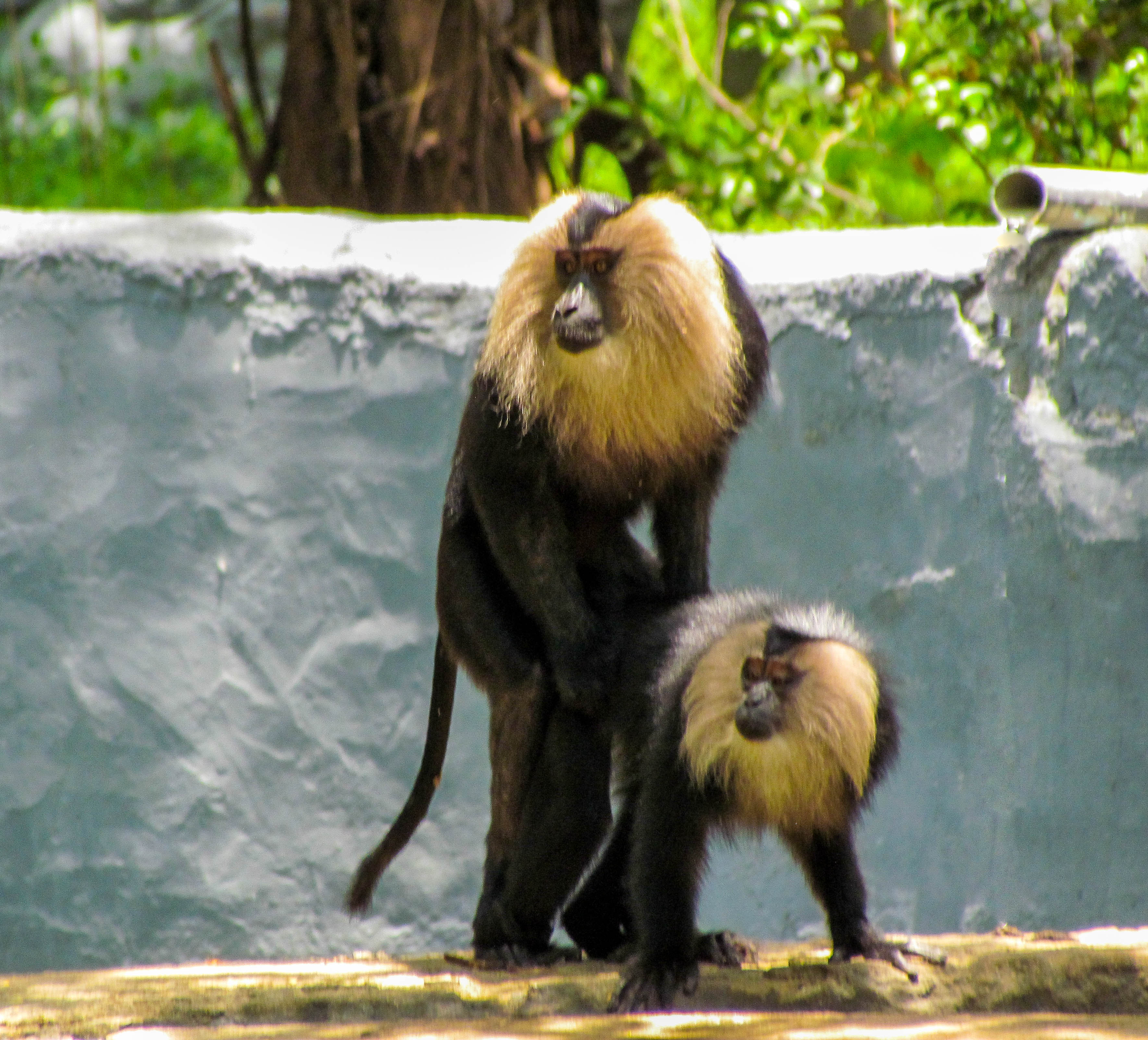
Mating

Lion-tailed macaque behavior is characterized by typical patterns of arboreal living. These patterns involve selectively feeding on a large variety of fruit trees, large interindividual spaces while foraging, and time budgets with high proportion of time devoted to exploration and feeding. Lion-tailed macaques are omnivores, primarily eating indigenous fruits, seeds, flowers, insects, snails, and small vertebrates in virgin forest. Lion-tailed macaques are very important for seed dispersal, and are able to transport seeds long distances by either dropping or defecating seeds. However, due to changes in their environment, adaption to rapid environmental change has occurred in areas of massive selective logging through behavioral modifications and broadening of food choices. These changes involve a large increase in ground foraging and feeding on far more non-native plants and insects. These feeding changes include fruits, seeds, shoots, pith, flowers, cones, mesocarp, and other parts of many non-indigenous and pioneer plants. In the forests of Kerala they were observed preying on nestlings and eggs of pigeons.

Gestation lasts approximately six months. The young are nursed for one year. Sexual maturity is reached at four years for females, and six years for males. The life expectancy in the wild is approximately 20 years, while in captivity is up to 30 years.

== Threats ==
While lion-tailed macaques are preyed on by snakes, raptors, and large carnivores, the impact of natural predators on population size does not compare to their largest threat. The largest threat to the lion-tailed macaque is habitat fragmentation due to large amounts of timber harvesting and exotic plantations, such as tea and coffee. This fragmentation leads to many problems. Lion-tailed macaques are struggling to find food, being hit by cars, and being electrocuted by power lines. Due to their low numbers and high levels of fragmentation, they are also highly susceptible to inbreeding, which can cause many genetic issues. Their second largest threat is from humans hunting and trapping them for meat, especially within areas that have primates as their preferred food. There are also many human-primate conflicts occurring now due to macaques venturing out of their forests to find food.

== Conservation and population ==
An assessment in 2003 for IUCN reports 3,000–3,500 of these animals scattered over several areas in Tamil Nadu, Kerala, Karnataka. The lion-tailed macaque ranks among the rarest and most threatened primates. Their range has become increasingly isolated and fragmented by the spread of agriculture and tea, coffee, teak and cinchona, construction of water reservoirs for irrigation and power generation, and human settlements to support such activities.

From 1977 to 1980, public concern about the endangered status of lion-tailed macaque became the focal point of Save Silent Valley, India's fiercest environmental debate of the decade. From 1993 to 1996, 14 troops were observed in Silent Valley National Park, Kerala, one of the most undisturbed viable habitats left for them. Silent Valley has the largest number of lion-tailed macaques in South India. Other protected areas in Kerala include Neyyar Wildlife Sanctuary, Peppara Wildlife Sanctuary, Shendurney Wildlife Sanctuary, Periyar Tiger Reserve and its premises (Gavi and Konni), Eravikulam National Park, Pambadum Shola National Park, Parambikulam Tiger Reserve, Annaimalai Tiger Reserve, New Amarambalam Reserved Forest, Aralam Wildlife Sanctuary and Chimmony Wildlife Sanctuary and Wayanad region.

A self-sustainable single population of 32 groups of lion-tailed macaques occurred in Sirsi-Honnavara, Karnataka, the northernmost population of the species. A local census concluded in 2007, conducted in the Theni District of Tamil Nadu, put their numbers at around 250, which was considered encouraging, because until then, no lion-tailed macaques had been reported in that specific area. The species is also prominently found in the Papanasam part of the Kalakkad Mundanthurai Tiger Reserve of Tirunelveli district, the Palani Hills Wildlife Sanctuary and National Park of Dindigul, the Anaimalai Tiger Reserve of Coimbatore in Tamil Nadu. Many zoos take part in breeding programs which help to secure the survival of this species. About 338 of these macaques are reported to live in zoos. (In July 2021 Australia's Rockhampton Zoo euthanased Australia's last lion-tailed macaque after its companion died of natural causes.) However, it is no longer on 'The World's 25 Most Endangered Primates' list, after the international body compiling it determined that the local governments in southern India had acted positively to protect it.
