= Pampadum Shola National Park =

National park in India

- IUCN category II (national park)
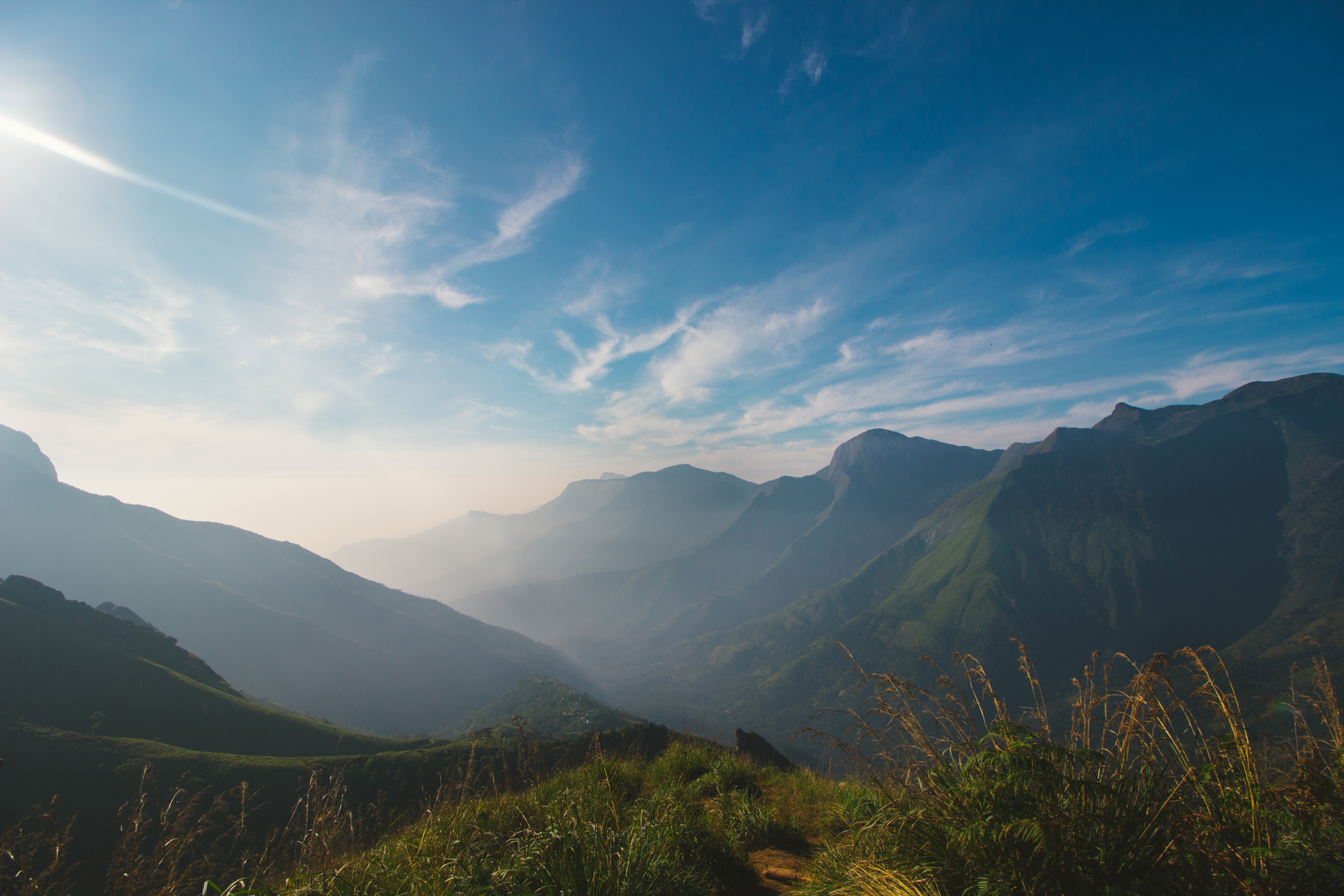

- Location within Kerala Location within India
- Interactive map of Pampadum Shola National Park
- Location: Near Vattavada, Devikulam taluk, Idukki district, Kerala, South India
- Nearest city: Marayoor
- Coordinates: 10°8′38″N 77°16′1″E
- Area: 1.32 km^{2} (0.51 sq mi); Elevation: 1,886 meters (6,188 ft) to 2,531 meters (8,304 ft)
- Established: 2003
- Governing body: Kerala State Forest and Wild Life Department

Pampadum Shola National Park is the smallest national park in Idukki district of Kerala in India. It is on the border with Kodaikanal, Dindigul district of Tamil Nadu. The park is administered by the Kerala Department of Forests and Wildlife, Munnar Wildlife Division, together with the nearby Mathikettan Shola National Park, Eravikulam National Park, Anamudi Shola National Park, Chinnar Wildlife Sanctuary and the Kurinjimala Sanctuary. The park adjoins the Allinagaram Reserved Forest within the proposed Palani Hills Wildlife Sanctuary and National Park.It is a part of Palani hills stretched up to Vandaravu peak. The Westerns Ghats, Anamalai Sub-Cluster, including these parks, is under consideration by the UNESCO World Heritage Committee for selection as a World Heritage Site.

== Etymology ==
The name´"Pampadum Shola" means, "the forest where the snake dances", derived from three Malayalam words, "paampu(പാംപ്)", which means "snake"; "aattam", means "dance"; and "chola(ചോല), means "grassy forests near the high range". "Shola" may be considered an anglicized version of "chola".

== Flora ==
The park protects a moderate amount of montane evergreen shola forest that is associated with the wildlife rich Eravikulam National Park.

There are various types of medicinal plants (herbs), of which studies have been made. After the forest range there are grandis (a variety of eucalyptus) that threaten the ecology of the area due to their dehydrating and quick-spreading character. These trees as well as the private legal and illegal plantations of the same trees remain as a living danger. The eucalyptus trees (grandis) that eat up the unique eco-system is yet to be a consideration of the forestry. The national park with its unique richness of uncontaminated "humus", has been an interest of studies recently.

== Fauna ==
The keystone species here is the highly elusive and endangered, endemic small carnivore – the Nilgiri marten. Leopards and Indian wild dogs are sometimes sighted at dusk or dawn, tigers are an important animal of the park. The Old Kodaikanal–Munnar Road nearby is closed due to the growing population of wildlife such as elephants, buffaloes, lion tailed macaque, gaur and Nilgiri langurs.

Some notable birds found here include the Nilgiri wood-pigeon, white-bellied shortwing, vernal hanging parrot, blue rock-thrush, blue-capped rock-thrush and Nilgiri flycatcher, and black-and-orange flycatchers.

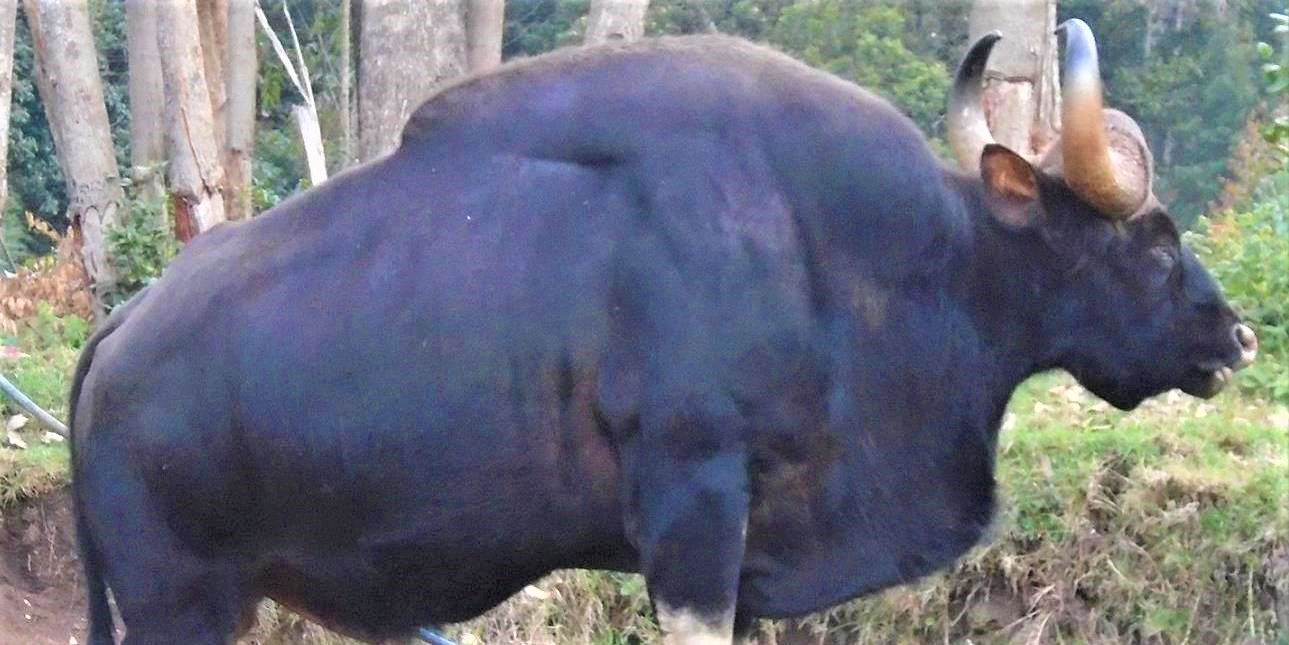
Gaur at the park

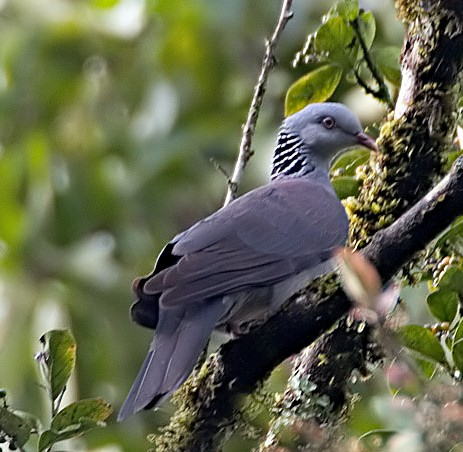
Nilgiri wood-pigeon (vulnerable)

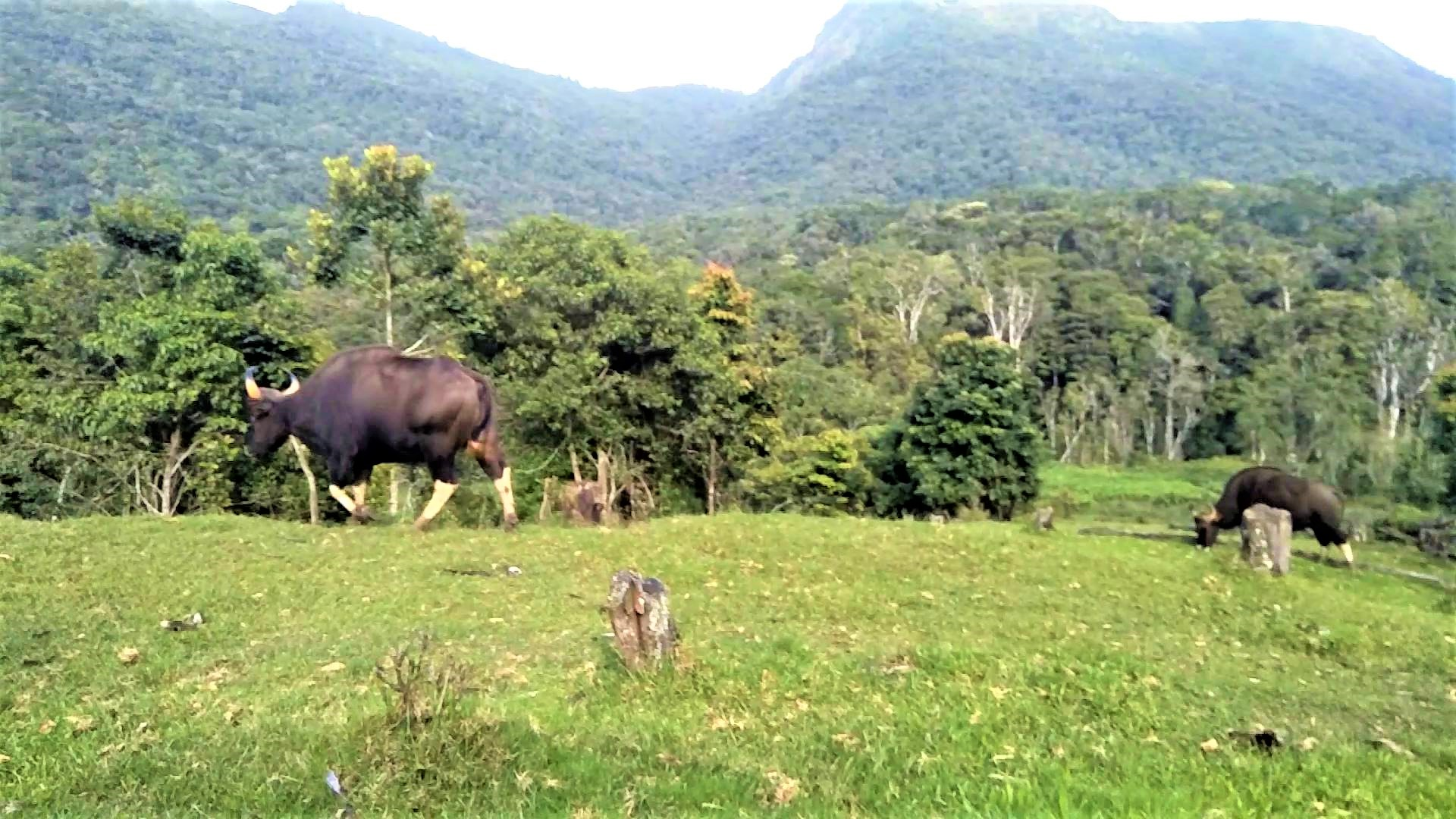
A view of the park

== Visiting ==
A welcome board is placed at the entrance of the national park, at the check-post, which is 7 km before reaching Vattavada. The national park is open to tourists for a fee, and visitors are accompanied by forest officers to ensure the safety of both the forest and the people. This evergreen forest containing bodies of water provides a habitat for various birds and animals and is situated about 35 km away from Munnar, along the road to Koviloor and Vattavada.

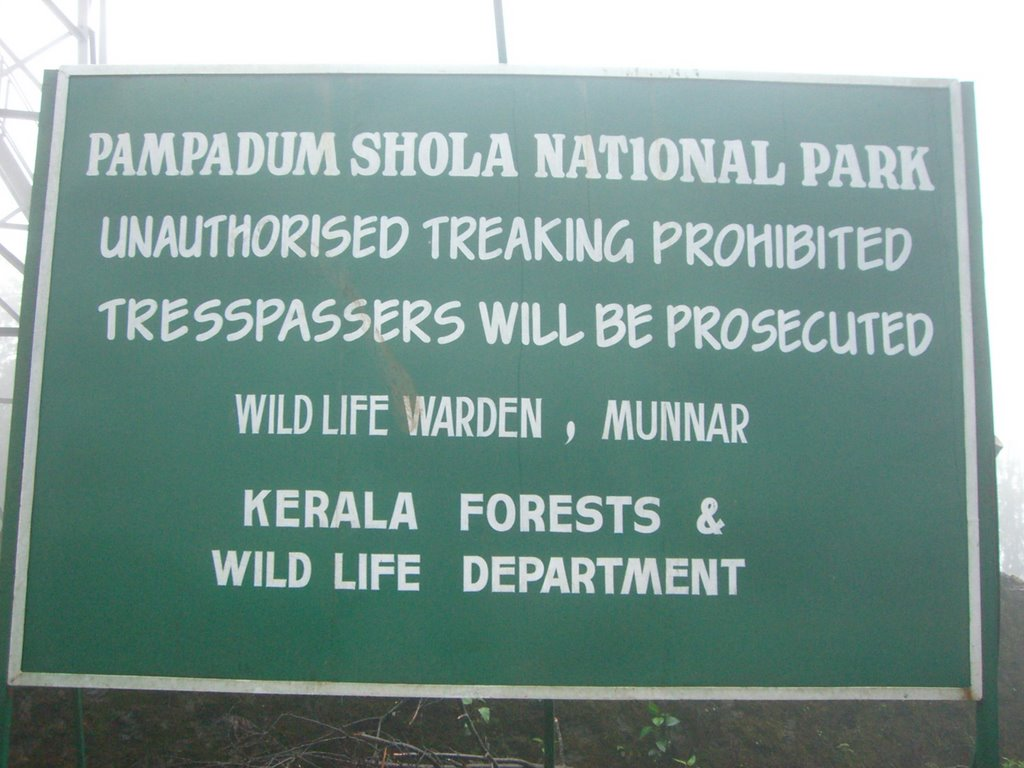
Unauthorized Trekking Prohibited

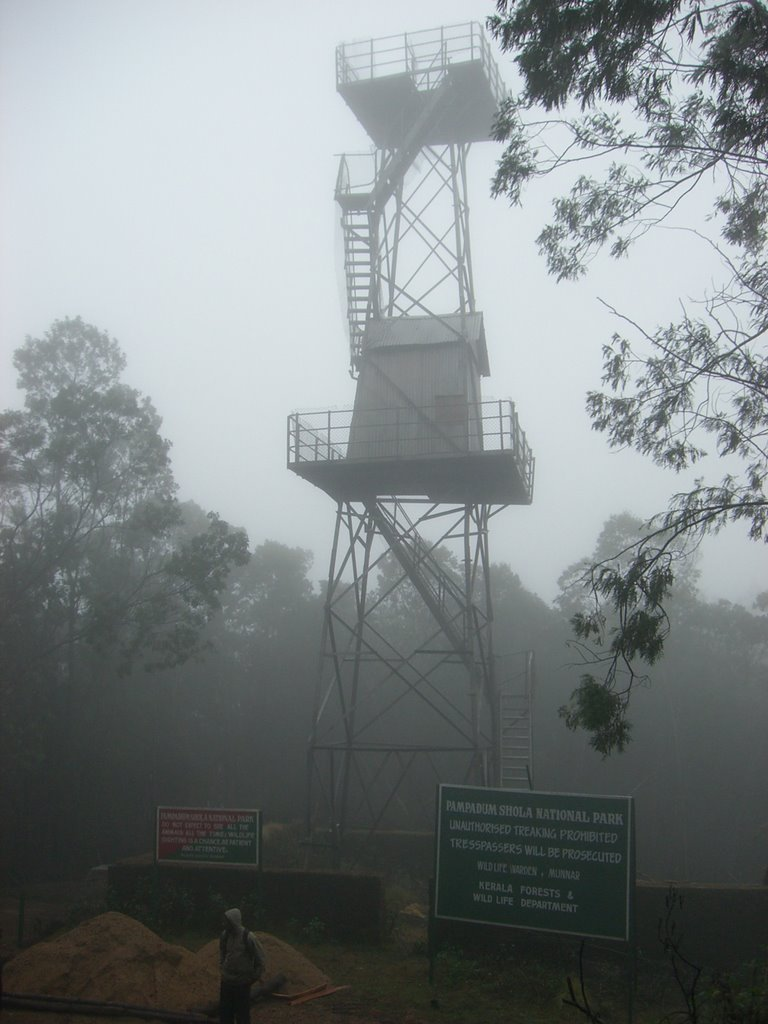
Vandaravu lookout tower

== Nearby villages ==
The adjacent villages beyond the National Park are Urkkad, Vattavada, Koviloor, and Kottakamboor, with its rich vegetable cultivations.
