= Kurinjimala Sanctuary =

Wildlife habitat

Coordinates: 10.23°N 77.27°E

- IUCN category IV (habitat/species management area)
- Location within Kerala Location within India
- Interactive map of Kurinjimala Sanctuary

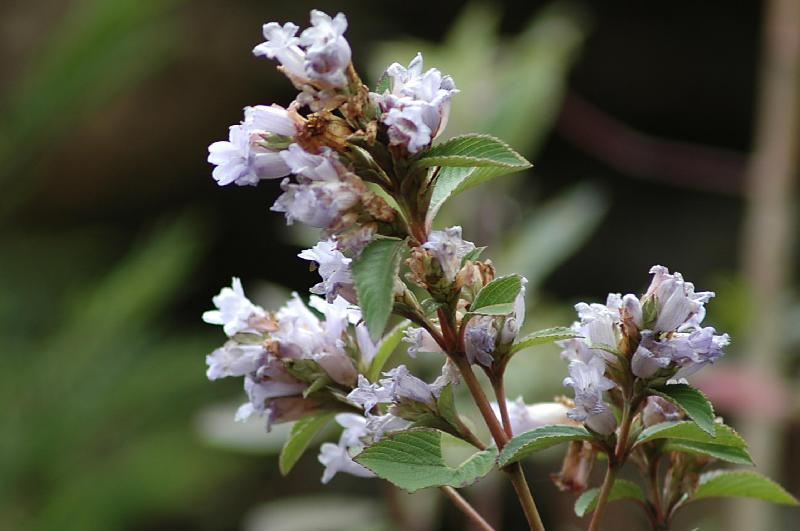
Neelakurinji

Kurinjimala Sanctuary protects the approximately 32 hectare core habitat of the endangered Neelakurinji plant in the Kottakamboor and Vattavada villages in Devikulam Taluk, in the Idukki district of Kerala, a state in southern India.

== History ==
According to some historians, the earliest known inhabitants of southern India were hunter-gatherers who inhabited Kurinjimala.

The sanctuary was declared by the Kerala Forest Minister Benoy Viswam at the Neelakurinji Fest at Munnar on 7 October 2006. During the 2006 bloom, massive flowering of Neelakurinji attracted nearly one million people to Munnar and other places.

The Government notification said that the sanctuary would ensure the long-term protection of the unique biodiversity of the area, especially Strobilanthes kunthiana and its habitat. Private land holdings having legal titles are excluded from the sanctuary area.

== Wildlife ==
The sanctuary is home to threatened species of elephant, gaur, nilgiri tahr and deer.

The new sanctuary is contiguous to the Chinnar Wildlife Sanctuary to the northwest, Manjampatti Valley in Amaravati Reserve Forest of Indira Gandhi Wildlife Sanctuary to the northeast, Eravikulam National Park and Anamudi Shola National Park to the west, Pampadum Shola National Park to the south and the proposed Palani Hills National Park to the east. The sanctuary provides continuity and connectivity to these five protected areas.

== Silambam ==
The Indian martial art of Silambam, known to be practiced by the Tamil people, originated in the Kurinji hills. It derives its name from the Tamil word silam, meaning hill, and the Kannada word bamboo from which the English word bamboo originates. The term silambambu referred to a particular type of bamboo from Kurinjimala. The silambam staff is known as neduvadi in Kerala, dhanta varisai in Karnataka, and karra saamu in Andhra Pradesh.
