= Anamudi Shola National Park =

Protected area in Idukki district, Kerala, India

- IUCN category II (national park)
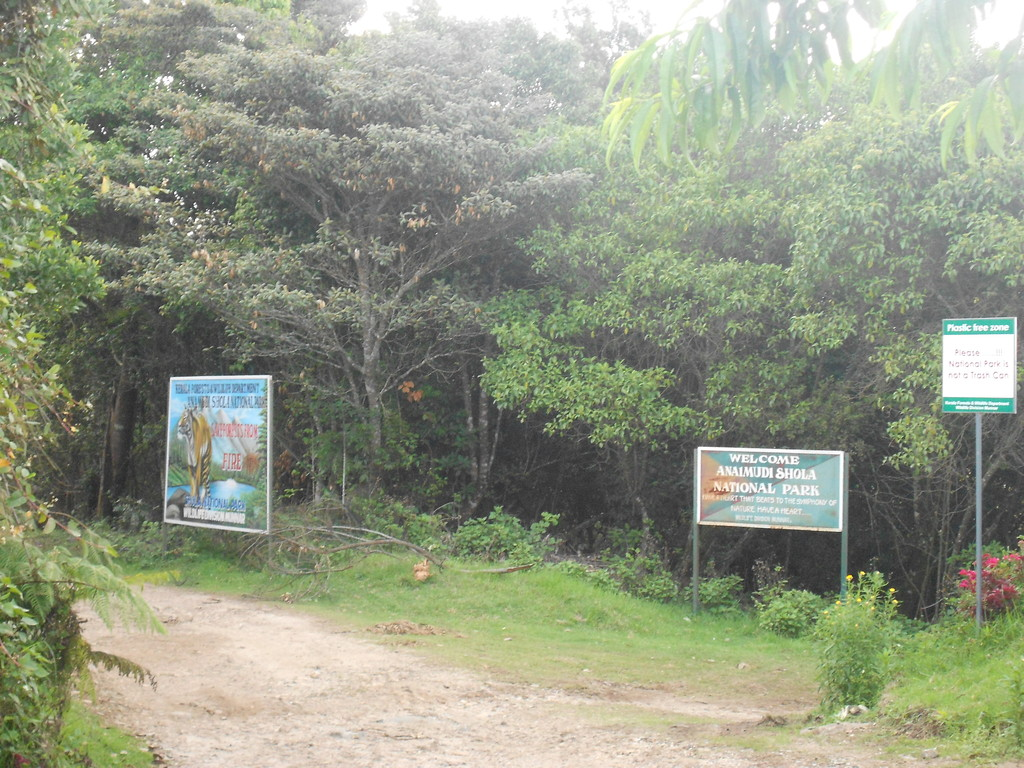
- Anamudi Shola National Park

- Location within Kerala Location within India
- Interactive map of Anamudi Shola National Park
- Location: Idukki district, Kerala, India
- Area: 7.5 km²
- Established: 2003

Anamudi Shola National Park is a protected area located along the Western Ghats of Idukki district in Kerala state, India. It is composed of Mannavan shola, Idivara shola and Pullardi shola, covering a total area of around 7.5 km². Draft notification of this new park was issued on 21 November 2003.

The park is administered by Munnar Wildlife Division, together with the nearby Mathikettan Shola National Park, Eravikulam National Park, Pampadum Shola National Park, Chinnar Wildlife Sanctuary and the Kurinjimala Sanctuary. The Western Ghats, Anamalai Sub-Cluster, including all of Eravikulam National Park, is under consideration by the UNESCO World Heritage Committee for selection as a World Heritage Site.

== Geography ==
Elevation ranges from 2,152 meters (7,060 ft) - 2,305 meters (7,562 ft). The average annual rainfall is about 2,500 millimeters (98 in). Anamudi Shola National Park provides wildlife habitat connectivity between Mathikettan Shola National Park, Eravikulam National Park, Pampadum Shola National Park, Chinnar Wildlife Sanctuary and the Kurinjimala Sanctuary, all of which surround this protected area. This national park forms part of the Anamalai sub-cluster, which was recently nominated for consideration for World Heritage Site status under UNESCO's World Heritage Programme.

== Fauna ==
The national park is a home for large number of faunal and floral species. The park consists of some of the rarest types of plants and species which are not found anywhere else.

The park provides safe and comfortable habitat to these wild species of flora and fauna. The rich wildlife includes Elephant, Tiger, Nilgiri tahr, Gaur, Spotted Deer, Sambar, Grizzled Giant Squirrel, Hanuman Langur, Sloth Bear, Flying Squirrels etc.
