= Eravikulam National Park =

National park in India

- IUCN category II (national park)
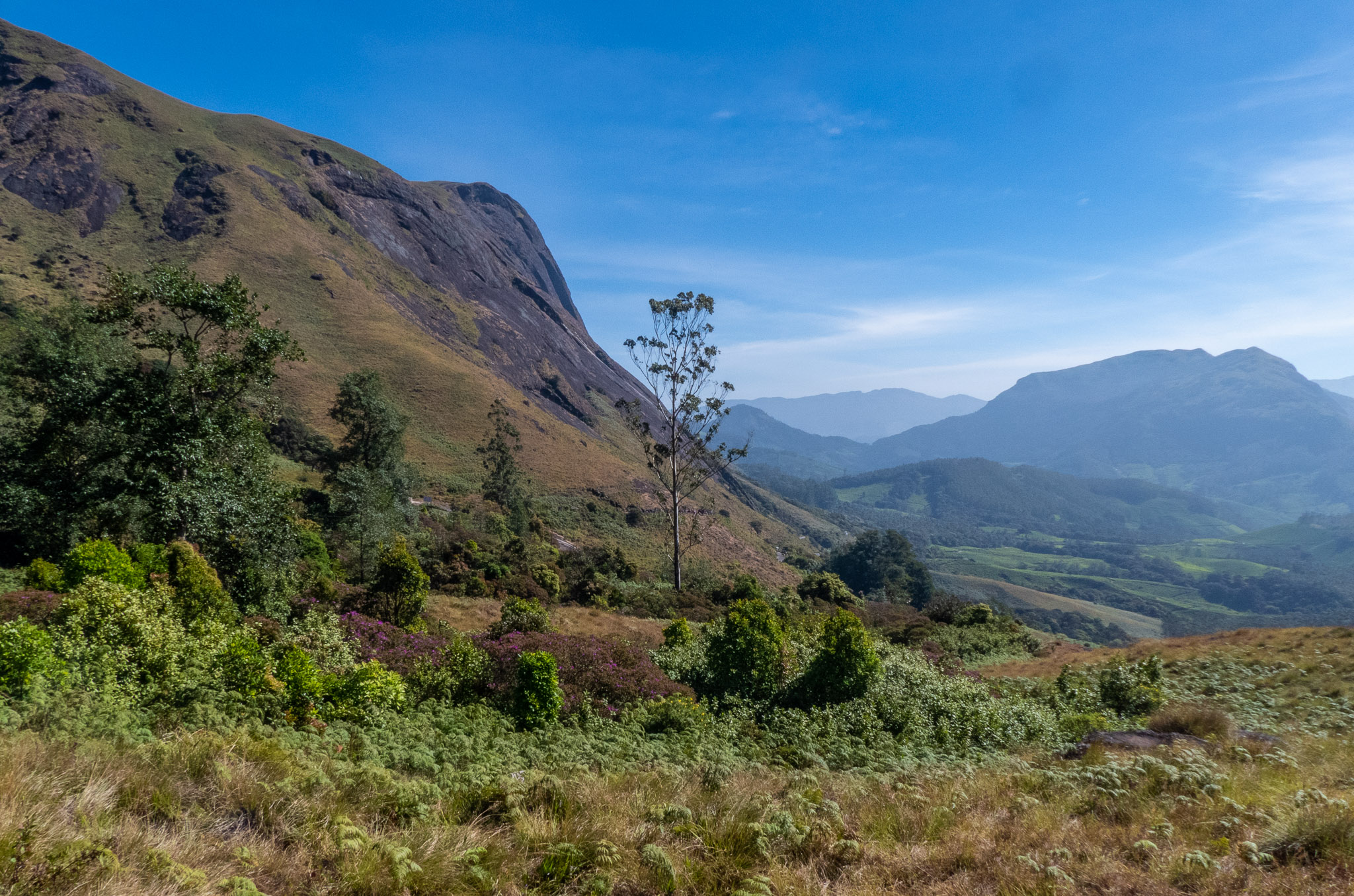
- Taken from famous view spot in Eravikulam National Park

- Location within Kerala Location within India
- Interactive map of Eravikulam National Park
- Location: Idukki, Kerala, India and Pooyamkutty forest, Ernakulam district, Kerala, India
- Nearest town: Munnar, Palani, Theni, Kothamangalam, Adimali
- Coordinates: 10.2°N 77.083°E
- Area: 97 km^{2} (37 sq mi)
- Visitors: 148,440 (in 2001)
- Governing body: Department of Forests and Wildlife, Government of Kerala
- Website: www.eravikulam.org

Eravikulam National Park is a 97 km^{2} national park located along the Western Ghats in the Idukki and Ernakulam districts of Kerala in India. The park is situated between 10º05'N and 10º20' north, and 77º0' and 77º10' east and is the first national park in Kerala. It was established in 1978.

Eravikulam National Park is administered by the Kerala Department of Forests and Wildlife, Munnar Wildlife Division, which also runs the nearby Mathikettan Shola National Park, Anamudi Shola National Park, Pambadum Shola National Park, Chinnar Wildlife Sanctuary and the Kurinjimala Sanctuary.

== Geography ==
The main body of the park consists of a high rolling hill plateau with a base elevation of about 2,000 m. The terrain consists of high altitude grasslands interspersed with sholas. Anamudi, at 2,695 meters the highest peak in South India, is inside the park. Many perennial streams criss-cross the park. They merge to form tributaries of the Periyar river in the west and of the Cauvery River in the east. The National Park is bordered by the dense Pooyamkutty and Idamalayar forests to the north-west. Lakkom Water falls is in this region.

== Fauna ==
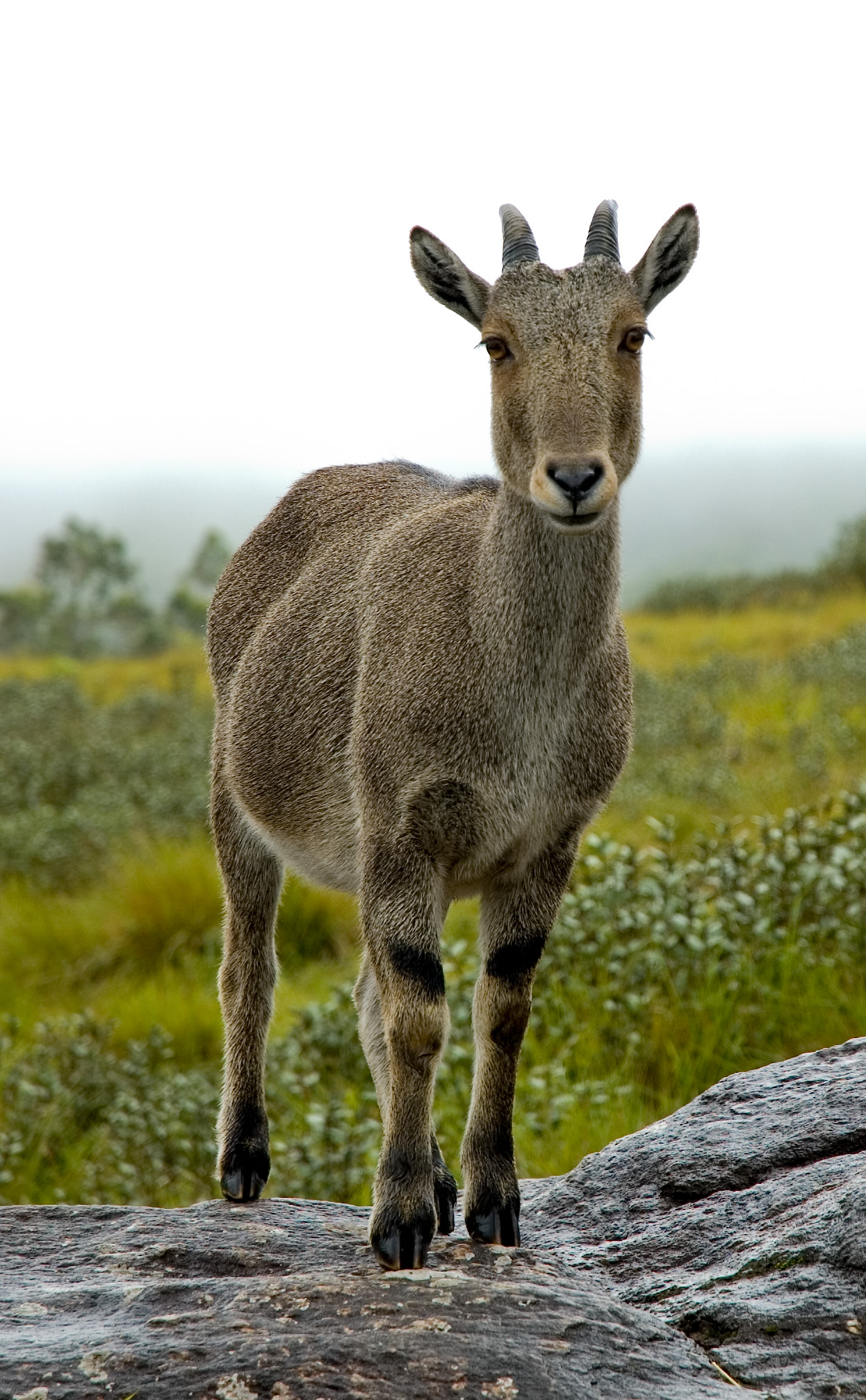
Nilgiri tahr in Eravikulam National Park

Twenty-six species of mammals have been recorded in the park, including the largest regional population of Nilgiri tahr (Nilgiritragus hylocrius), a rare highland ungulate related to sheep and goats, estimated at 750 individuals. Other local mammal species include chital, Nilgiri langur, lion-tailed macaques, gaur, red muntjac, wild boar and sambar. Golden jackals and dhole are the top canine predators, while jungle cats, Indian leopard and Bengal tiger are the top felines. Some of the smaller mammals include rodents, mustelids and viverrids, such as the dusky palm squirrel, Indian crested porcupine, ruddy, brown, grey and stripe-necked mongooses, Nilgiri marten and Asian small-clawed otter. Indian elephants make seasonal visits.

132 species of birds have been recorded, including endemics like the black-and-orange flycatcher, Nilgiri pipit, Nilgiri wood pigeon, Nilgiri blue robin, Nilgiri flycatcher and Palani laughingthrush.

Endemic butterflies (largely confined to the shola grassland ecosystem) include the red disk bushbrown and Palani fourring, among 101 total Lepidopteran species in the park. Other montane species include Colias nilagiriensis, and the endemic Heteropsis davisoni.

19 species of amphibians have been recorded in the park.

=== New species of frog found ===
In 2010, a new bright-reddish-orange frog, with multiple glands and extremely short limbs, was discovered in Eravikulam National Park. The newly discovered species was said to be, apparently, restricted to less than 3 km^{2} on the peak of Anamudi, thus being deserving of immediate conservation priority, as reported by scientists S.D. Biju of Delhi University and Franky Bossuyt of the Free University of Brussels in Current Science. The frog has been assigned the name Raorchestes resplendens. This frog, as compared to all other members of the genus, has multiple prominent glandular swellings: laterally behind the eyes, on the side of the dorsum, on the anterior side of the vent, on the dorsal side of the forearms and shanks, and on the posterior side of tarsus and metatarsus. Additional distinguishing characteristics include the colour of the iris (which is bright red) and its extremely short legs.

The genus Raorchestes (bush-frogs) is well represented in the park and surrounding area, with species including Beddome's bushfrog (R. bedomii), the Travancore bushfrog (R. travancoricus), green-eyed bushfrog (R. chlorosomma) and the Munnar bushfrog (R. munnarensis).

== Flora ==
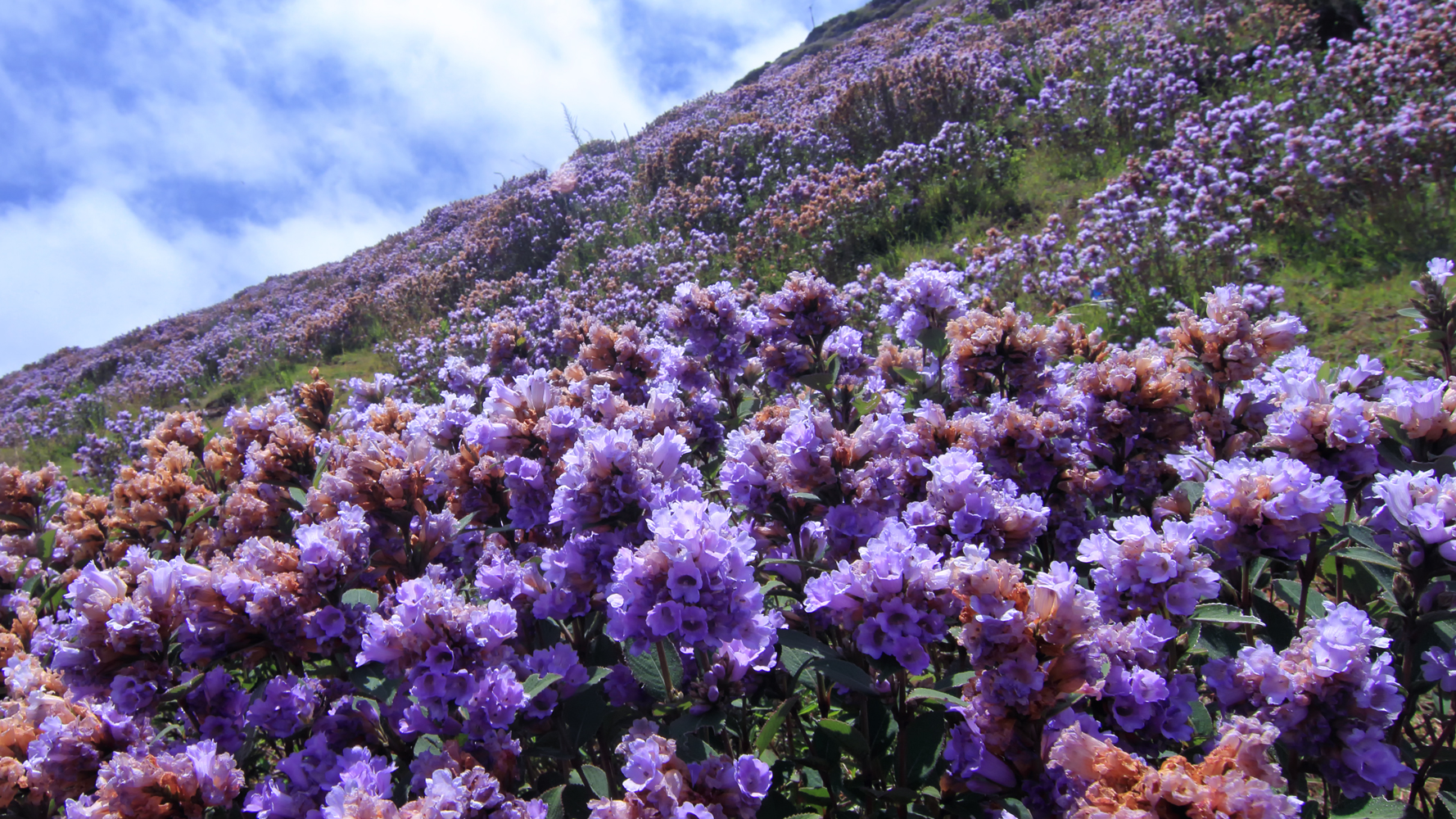
Neelakurinji blooms at Eravikulam National Park.

Three major types of plant communities are found in the park – grasslands, shrublands and forests. The terrain above 2000m is covered, primarily, by grasslands, but there are numerous smaller patches of forest in various hollows and gullies. The deeper valleys are extensively forested. Shrublands predominate along the bases of the cliffs, and are likewise interspersed in rocky areas. The antibacterial Eupatorium glandulosum is found here. As this is primarily montane forest vegetation, many small mosses and lichen are also found here.

== History ==
Prior to 1971, the area was managed as a game preserve by the Kanan Devan Hills Produce Company. The government of Kerala resumed control in 1971 (Kannan Devan Hill Produce (Resumption of lands) Act, 1971), and declared the Eravikulam-Rajamala Wildlife Sanctuary in 1975 to protect the habitat of the endangered Nilgiri tahr. It became a National Park in 1978.

== Gallery ==
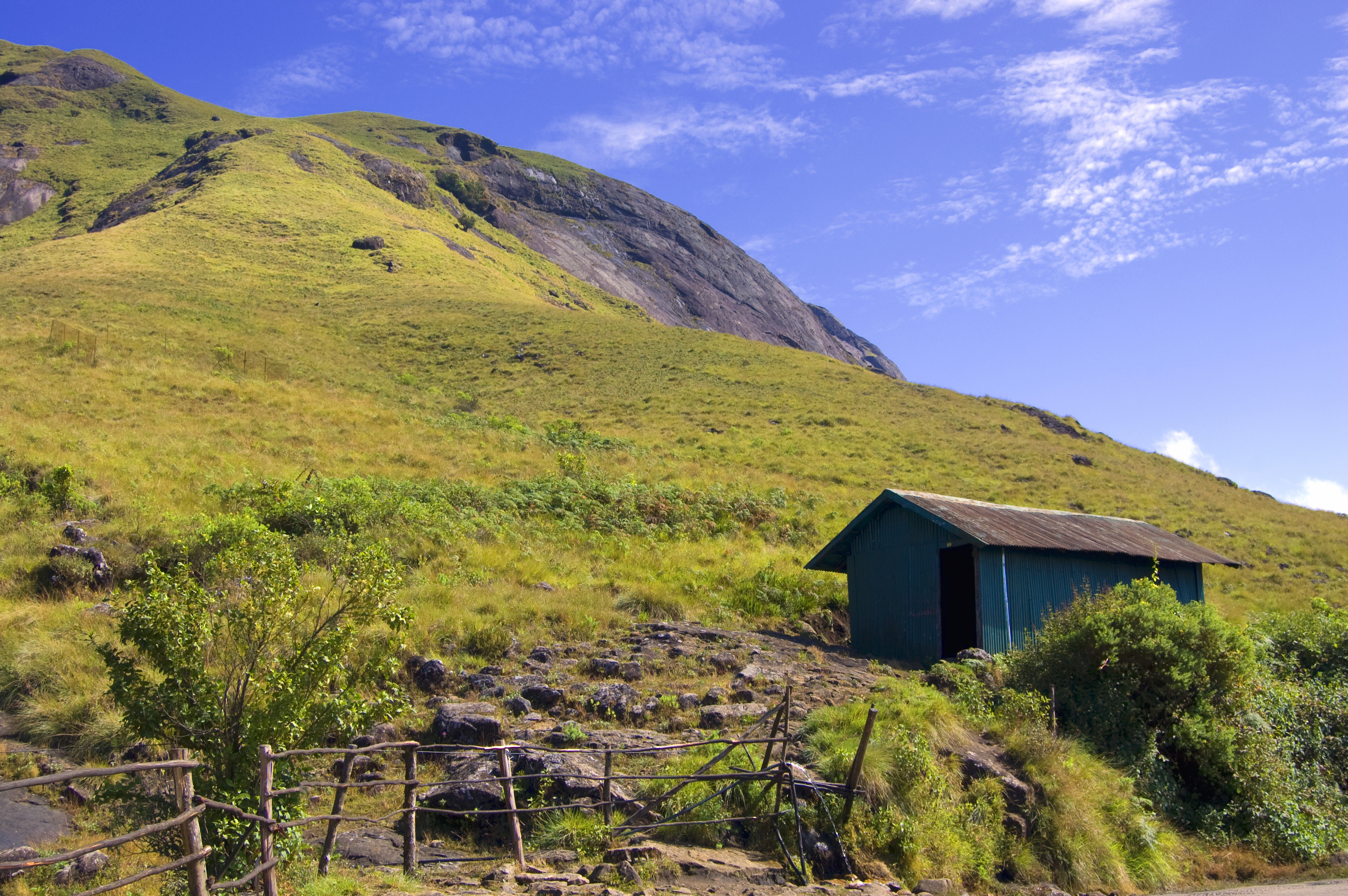
Trekking route in Eravikulam National Park

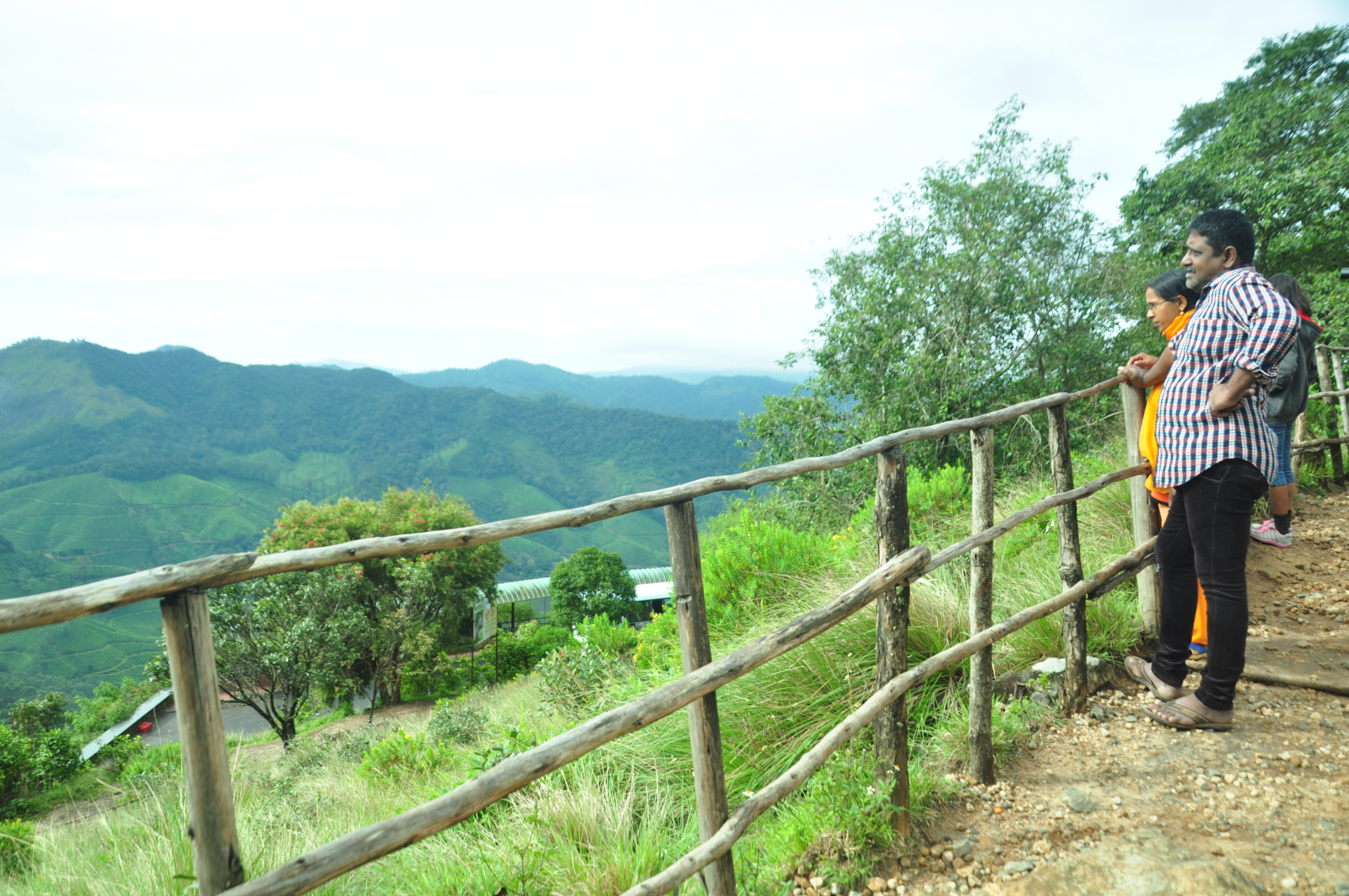
View of the Munnar Mountains from the top of Eravikulam National Park

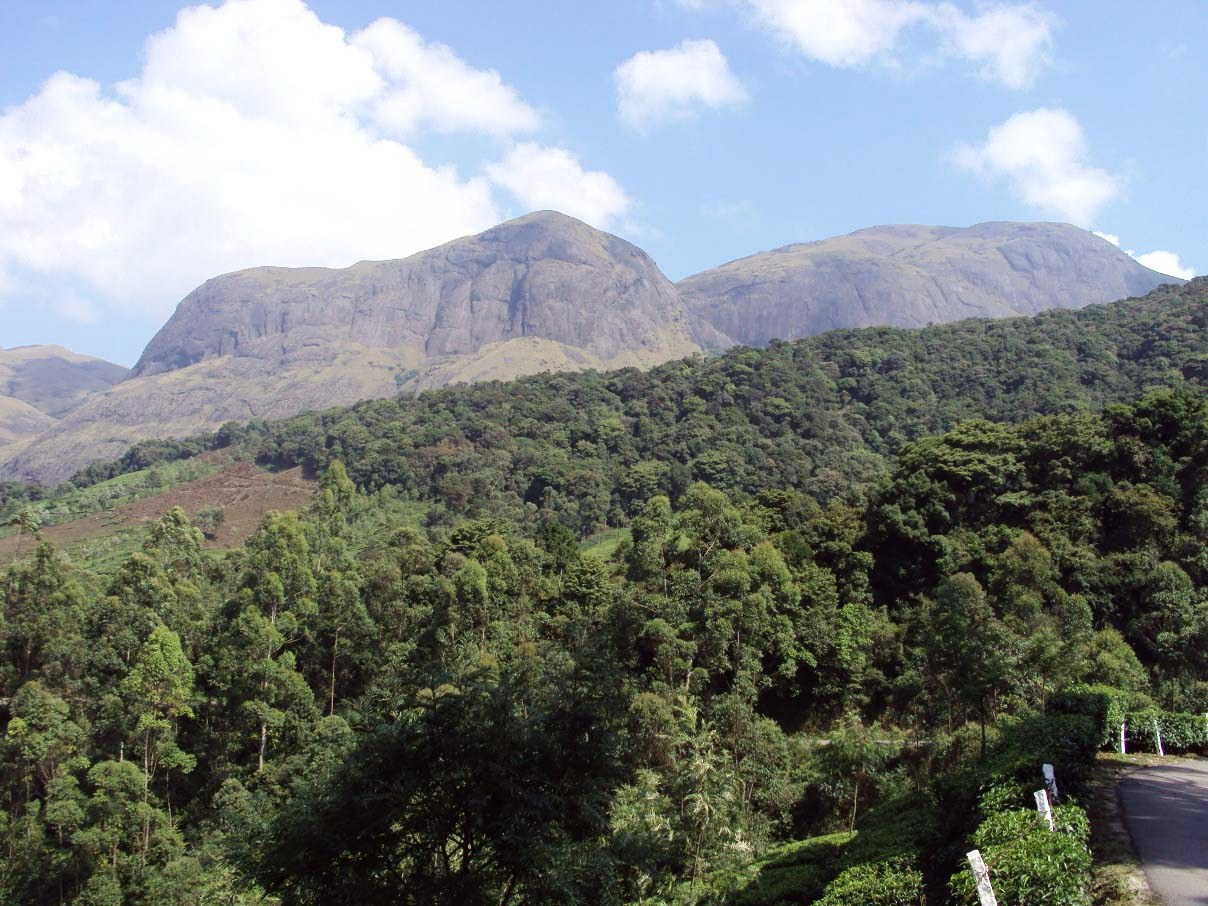
Anamudi, on the right, in the Eravikulam National Park

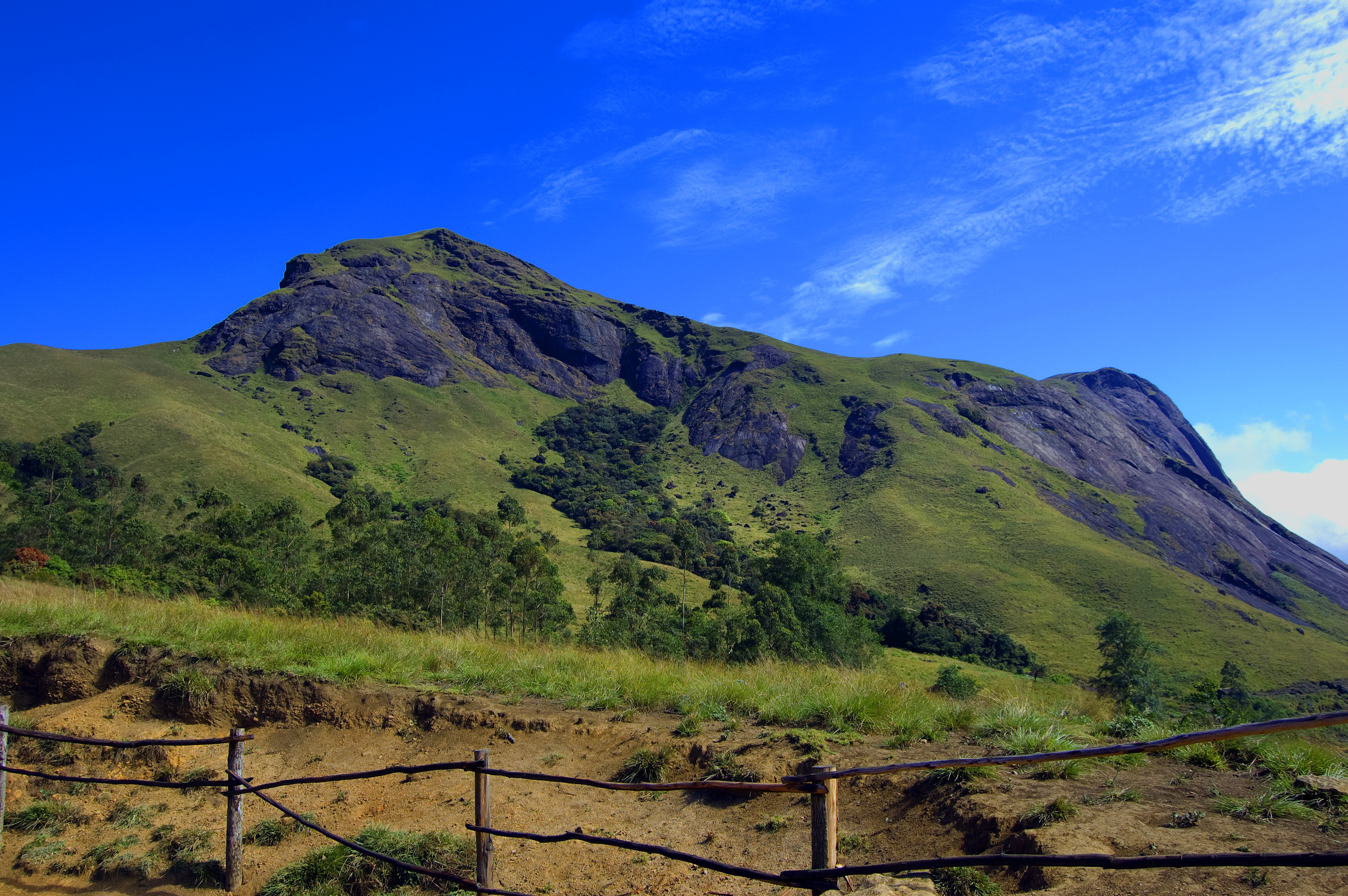
Naikolli Mala, near Anamudi from Eravikulam National Park

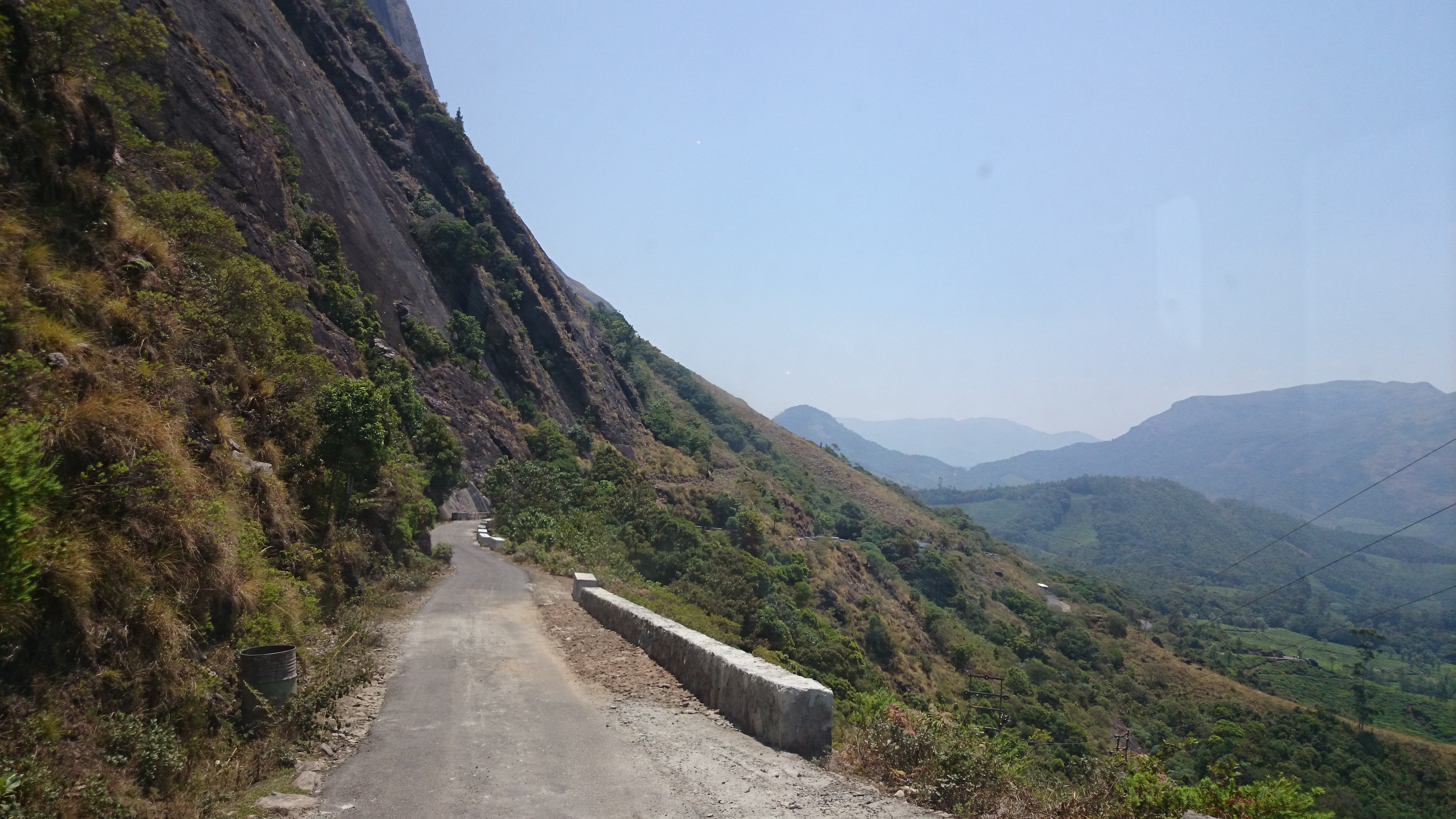
Eravikulam National Park Road

== See also ==
- List of birds of South India
- Anamudi
- Munnar
