= Chinnar Wildlife Sanctuary =

Wildlife sanctuary in South India

- IUCN category IV (habitat/species management area)
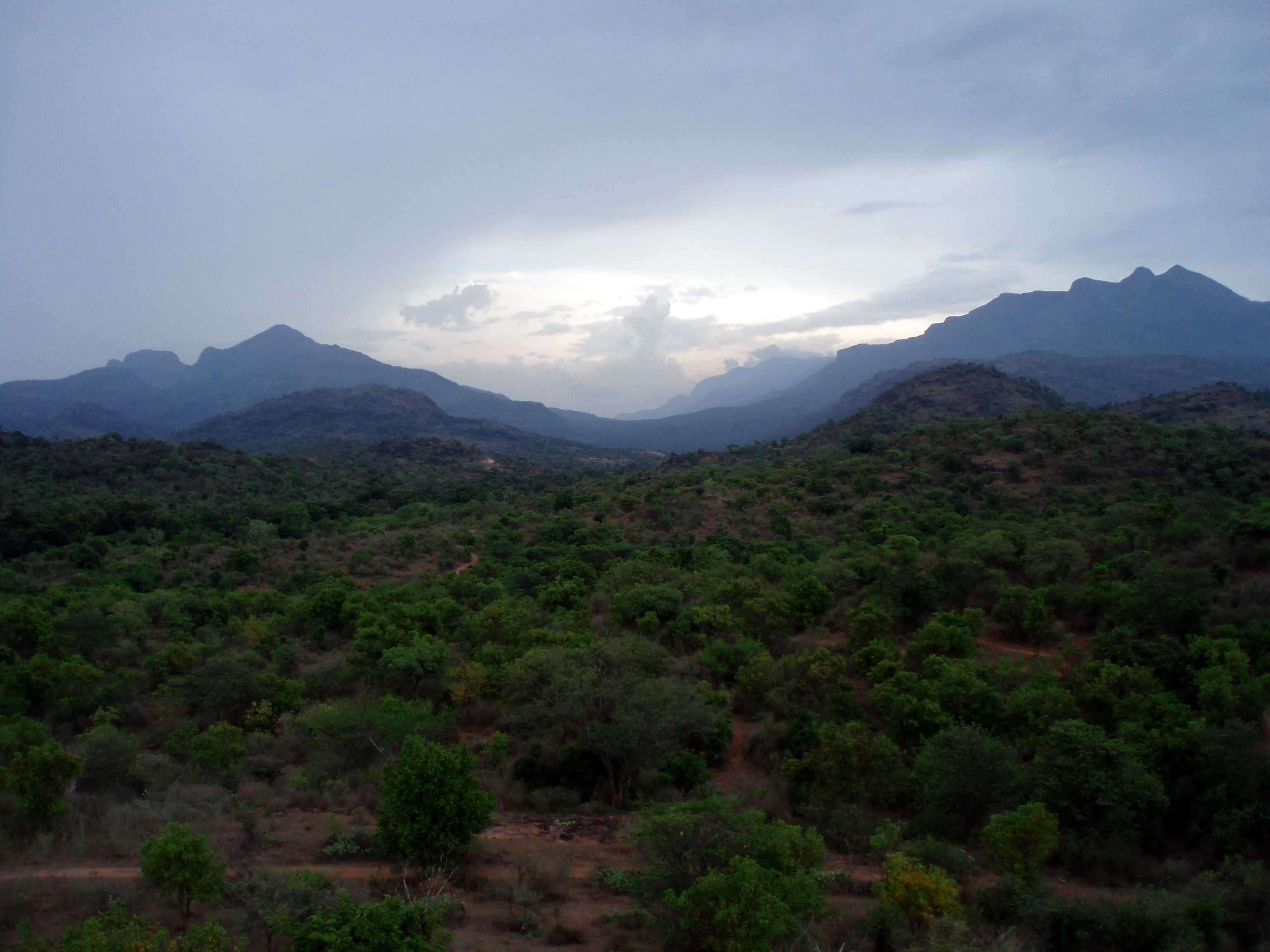

- Location within Kerala Location within India
- Interactive map of Chinnar Wildlife Sanctuary
- Location: Kerala, India
- Coordinates: 10.3°N 77.175°E
- Area: 90.44 km^{2} (34.92 sq mi)
- Elevation: 2372
- Established: August 1984

Chinnar Wildlife Sanctuary is a wildlife sanctuary in the Idukki district of India's Kerala state. It is one of 18 wildlife sanctuaries among the protected areas of Kerala. It hosts the only rehabilitation centre for the Indian star tortoise in India.

It is under the jurisdiction of and contiguous with Eravikulam National Park to the south. Indira Gandhi National Park is to the north and Palani Hills National Park is to the east. It forms an integral part of the 1,187 km^{2} (458 sq mi) block of protected forests straddling the Kerala-Tamil Nadu border in the Anaimalai Hills. The Western Ghats, Anamalai Sub-Cluster, including all of Chinnar Wildlife Sanctuary, is under consideration by the UNESCO World Heritage Committee for selection as a World Heritage Site.

== Geography ==
Chinnar Wildlife Sanctuary is located between latitude 10º15' - 10º21' N and longitude 77º5' - 77º16' E. The Munnar – Udumalpet road SH 17 passes through the sanctuary for 16 km and divides it into nearly equal portions. Average annual rainfall is only 500 mm, spread over about 48 days, because it is in the rain shadow region of the southern Western Ghats.

The elevation ranges from 400 m (1,300 ft) at east end of the Chinnar River to 2,522 m (8,274 ft) at Kumarikkal Mala peak. Other major peaks in the sanctuary are Nandala Malai 2,372 m (7,782 ft), Kottakombu malai (2,144 m (7,034 ft)), Vellaikal malai (1,863 m (6,112 ft)) and Viriyoottu malai 1,845 m (6,053 ft). In contrast, Anamudi peak 2,695 m (8,842 ft), located 23 km (14 mi) away in the adjacent Eravikulam National Park, is the highest peak in South India.

== Settlements and crops ==
There are 11 tribal settlements inside the Chinnar WLS, each is well demarcated by temporary stone walls. The main inhabitants are Muthuvas and Pulayars. Cultivation of maize, ragi and lemongrass is practiced in the settlements. The Mudhuvas carry out small scale ganja cultivation for their religious purposes.

== Fauna ==
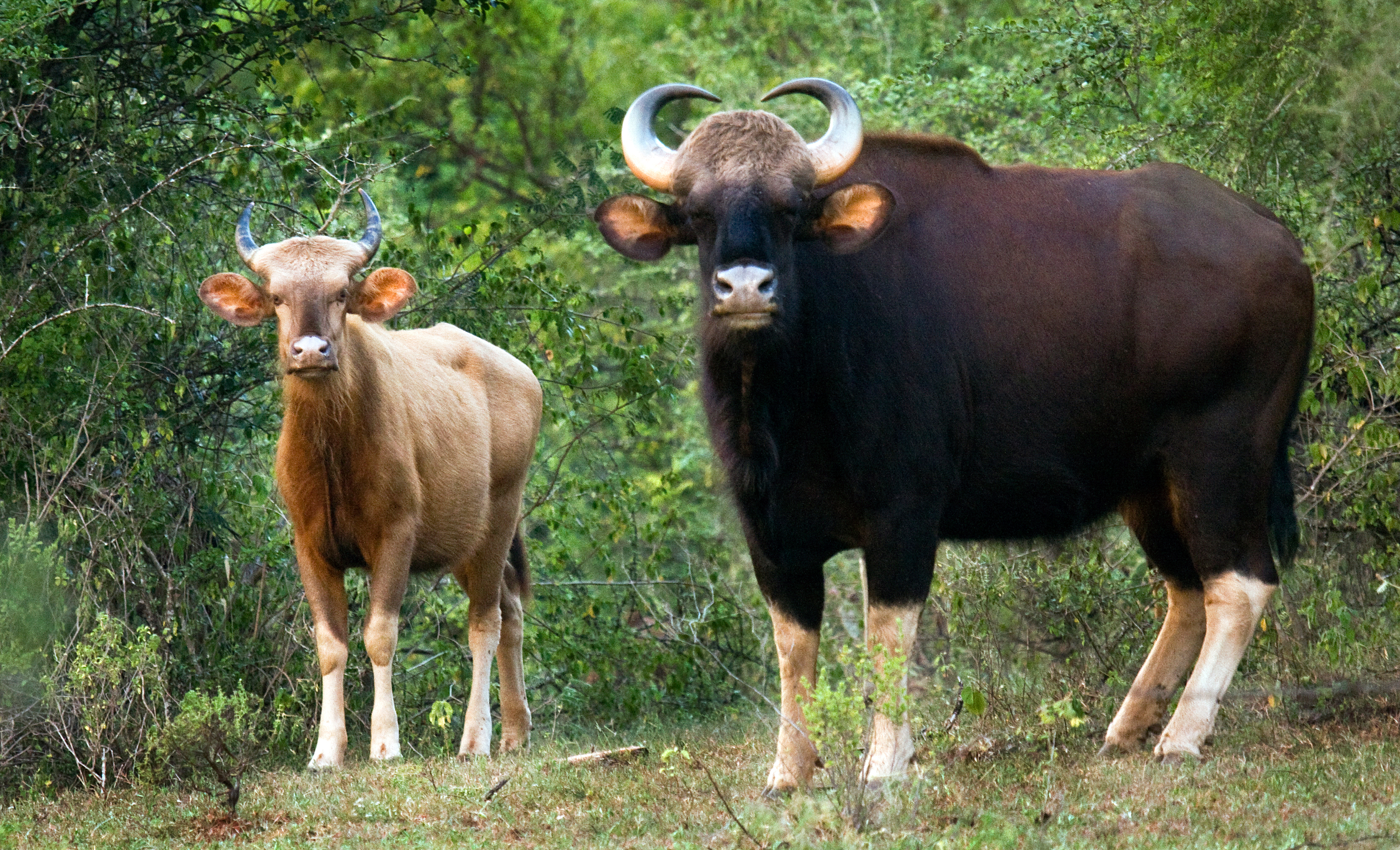
Albino gaur or Manjampatti white bison. Albino gaur are very rare; this photograph was taken in Chinnar Wildlife Sanctuary.

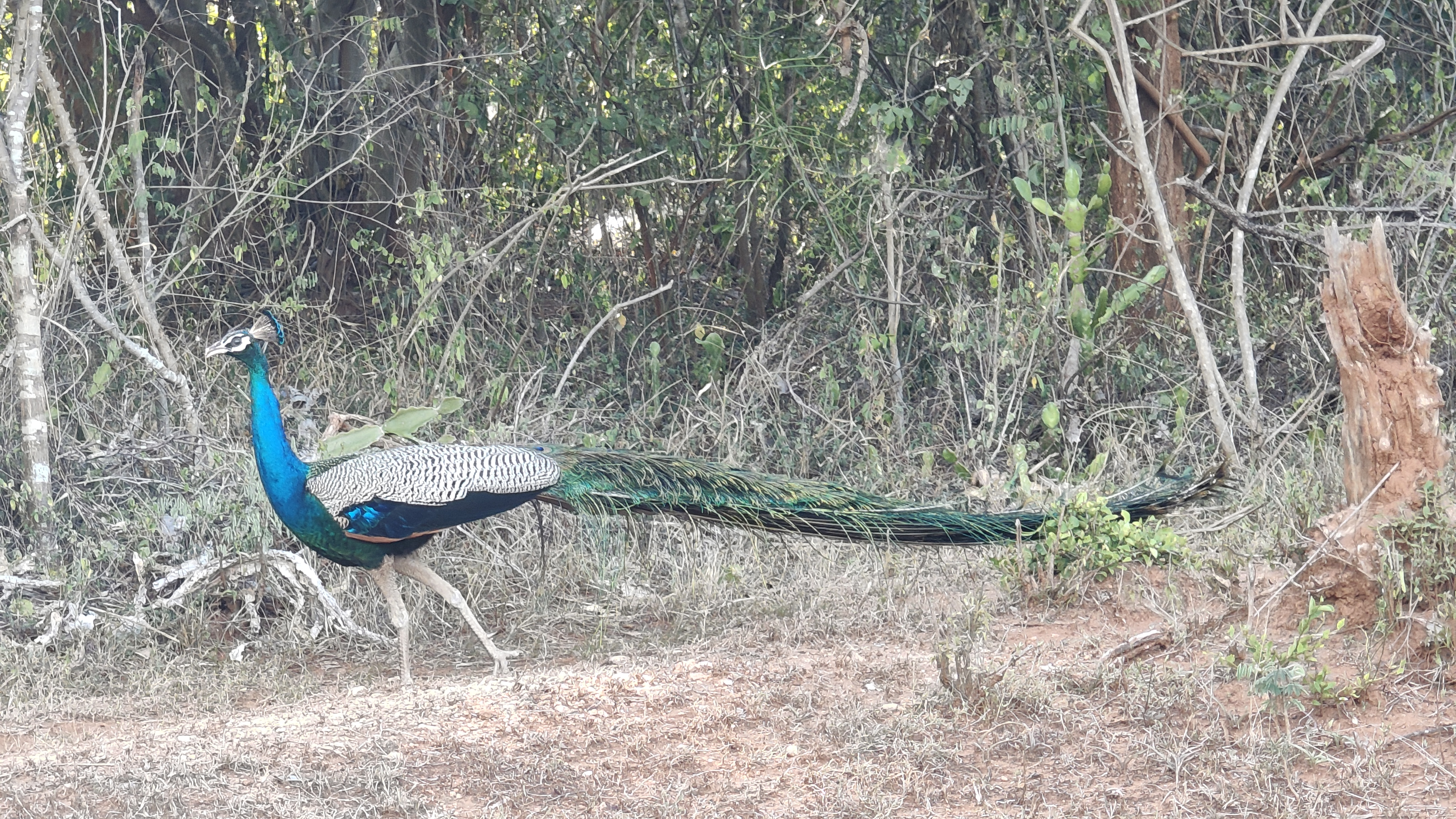
peacock in Chinnar Wildlife Sanctuary

The sanctuary's fauna comprises:

- 28 mammal species, including Indian leopard and spotted deer, Indian elephant, gaur, Bengal tiger, sambar deer, common langur, bonnet macaque, gray langur, Nilgiri tahr, rusty-spotted cat and grizzled giant squirrel;
- 225 bird species including yellow-throated bulbul;
- 52 reptile species including 29 species of snakes, Indian star tortoise and the largest population of mugger crocodiles in Kerala;
- 14 fish species observed in the Chinnar and Pambar rivers include Garra mullya, river-carp baril, giant danio and the endangered hill stream game fish Deccan mahseer;
- 15 amphibian species;
- 156 species of butterflies.

In 2016, 101 species of spiders were reported.

== Flora ==
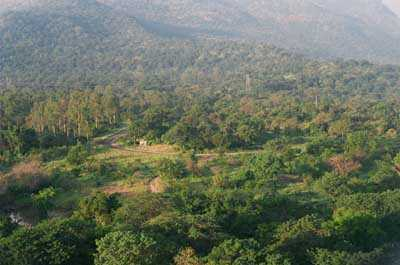
View of Chinnar montane rain forest

There are 963 species of flowering plants in the sanctuary. Ecoregions of the sanctuary comprise mostly grassland and wet grasslands vegetation and some South Western Ghats montane rain forests and high shola at the higher western elevations. South Western Ghats moist deciduous forests at mid elevations give way to dry deciduous forests and thorny scrub forests in the lower dryer eastern edges of the valley. The major xerophytic species in the thorny scrub forests are Acacia arabica, Acacia leucofolia, Acacia concinna, Prosporis juliflora, and Opuntia stricta.

The Marayoor sandalwood forest is located here.

== Regional cooperation ==
Senior officials of the Ministry of Environment and Forests (India), Principal Chief Conservators of Forests of Kerala, Tamil Nadu, Andhra Pradesh and Karnataka, together with other senior forest officials of these states and the Union Territory of Pondicherry, met at Thiruvananthapuram on 3 and 4 November 2006 and resolved several mutual issues concerning conservation and protection of forests and wildlife of the region.

A regular conference of the forest ministers and forest officials of the southern states is held once a year, in rotation in each state.
