= List of mountain peaks of the Western Ghats =

The following is a list of peaks in the Western Ghats:

Rank	Name	Elevation	Location	State	Coordinates	Image
1	Anamudi	2,695 m (8,842 ft)	Eravikulam National Park	Kerala	10°10′09″N 77°03′38″E	A view of the Anaimudi peak from the Naikolli Mala ridge
2	Meesapulimala	2,640 m (8,660 ft)	Idukki-Theni	Kerala- Tamil Nadu	10.097403°N 77.203417°E	Meeahapullimala
3	Doddabetta	2,637 m (8,652 ft)	Nilgiris	Tamil Nadu	11°22′17″N 76°31′03″E	Telescope House, Doddabetta Peak, Ooty
4	Kolaribetta	2,629 m (8,625 ft)	Mukurthi National Park	Tamil Nadu	11.291°N 76.550°E	
5	Mukurthi Peak	2,594 m (8,510 ft)	Nilgiris-Nilambur	Tamil Nadu-Kerala	11.3713°N 76.5175°E	Mukurthi Peak
6	Vandaravu	2,553 m (8,376 ft)	Palani Hills	Tamil Nadu	10.149°N 77.273°E	
7	Kattumala	2,552 m (8,373 ft)	Eravikulam National Park	Kerala	10°15′16.5702″N 77°05′52.2843″E	
8	Snowdon	2,530 m (8,300 ft)	Nilgiris	Tamil Nadu		Snowdon Peak
9	Devimala	2,523 m (8,278 ft)	Devikulam	Kerala		
10	Kumarikkal Mala	2,522 m (8,274 ft)	Chinnar Wildlife Sanctuary	Kerala		
11	Elk Hill	2,466 m (8,091 ft)	Nilgiris	Tamil Nadu		Elk Hill
12	Club Hill	2,448 m (8,031 ft)	Nilgiris	Tamil Nadu		Club Hill
13	Kulkudi	2,439 m (8,002 ft)	Nilgiris	Tamil Nadu		
14	Kattadadu	2,418 m (7,933 ft)	Nilgiris	Tamil Nadu		
15	Perumal Malai	2,234 m (7,329 ft)	Kodaikanal	Tamil Nadu	10°17′56.103″N 77°33′51.05″E	
16	Eravimala	2,401 m (7,877 ft)	Idukki	Kerala		
17	Anginda peak	2,383 m (7,818 ft)	Nilgiris	Tamil Nadu	11°12′26″N 76°27′51″E	
18	Hecuba	2,375 m (7,792 ft)	Nilgiris	Tamil Nadu		
19	Nandala Mala	2,372 m (7,782 ft)	Chinnar Wildlife Sanctuary	Kerala		
20	Vavul Mala	2,339 m (7,674 ft)	Malappuram Nilambur, Kozhikode	Kerala	11°25′41″N 76°07′52″E	
21	Sispara	2,206 m (7,238 ft)	Silent Valley National Park	Kerala	11°12′12″N 76°25′56″E	
22	Kottakombu Mala	2,144 m (7,034 ft)	Chinnar Wildlife Sanctuary	Kerala		
23	Chembra Peak	2,100 m (6,900 ft)	Wayanad	Kerala	11°30′44″N 76°05′22″E	Chembra Peak
24	Elivai Mala	2,088 m (6,850 ft)	Palakkad	Kerala	10°56′23.974″N 76°37′56.96″E	
25	Banasura Hill	2,073 m (6,801 ft)	Wayanad	Kerala	11°41′39″N 75°54′29″E	
26	Kottamala	2,019 m (6,624 ft)	Pathanamthitta	Kerala	9°31′16″N 77°24′07″E	
27	Devar Mala	1,937 m (6,354 ft)	Pathanamthitta	Kerala		
28	Mullayanagiri	1,930 m	Chikmangalur	Karnataka		
29	Baba Budangiri	1,895 m (6,217 ft)	Chikmagalur	Karnataka	13.421°N 75.763°E	
30	Kudremukha	1,894 m (6,214 ft)	Chikmagalur	Karnataka	13°07′46.24″N 75°16′06.79″E	
31	Agasthyamala	1,868 m (6,129 ft)	Thiruvananthapuram Tirunelveli border	Kerala Tamil Nadu border	8°37′N 77°15′E	
32	Kemmangundi peak	1,863 m (6,112 ft)	Chikmagalur	Karnataka	13.516°N 75.774°E	
33	Biligiriranga Hills	1,816 m (5,958 ft)	Chamarajanagar	Karnataka	11.866°N 77.188°E	
34	Rangaswamy Peak and Pillar	1,794 m (5,886 ft)	Nilgiris	Tamil Nadu		
35	Velliangiri Mountains	1,778 m (5,833 ft)	Coimbatore	Tamil Nadu	10°59′19.68″N 76°41′14.279″E	
36	Tadiandamol	1,748 m (5,735 ft)	Kodagu	Karnataka	12°13′3.2308″N 75°36′31.7340″E	
37	Kumara Parvata	1,712 m (5,617 ft)	Pushpagiri Wildlife Sanctuary	Karnataka	12°40′00″N 75°41′00″E	
38	Merthi Gudda	1,676 m (5,499 ft)	Chickmagalur	Karnataka		
39	Malleswaran	1,664 m (5,459 ft)	Agali Hills	Kerala		
40	Kalsubai	1,648 m (5,407 ft)	Ahmednagar	Maharashtra	19°36′04″N 73°42′33″E	
41	Mahendragiri	1,645 m (5,397 ft)	Tirunelveli	Tamil Nadu	8°23′18″N 77°31′17″E	
42	Kote betta	1,620 m (5,310 ft)	Kodagu	Karnataka		
43	Brahmagiri	1,608 m (5,276 ft)	Kodagu/Wayanad district	Karnataka/Kerala	11°57′N 75°57′E	
44	Padagiri	1,585 m (5,200 ft)	Nelliampathy	Kerala	10°28′46″N 76°42′5″E	
45	Salher	1,567 m (5,141 ft)	Nashik	Maharashtra	20°43′20.137″N 73°56′43.64″E	
46	Madikeri	1,525 m (5,003 ft)	Kodagu	Karnataka	12°25′15.24″N 75°44′22.919″E	
47	Pulamala	1,505 m (4,938 ft)	Thekkady	Kerala		
48	Dhodap	1,472 m (4,829 ft)	Nashik	Maharashtra		
49	Gangamoola	1,458 m (4,783 ft)	Kudremukh National Park	Karnataka		
50	Himavad Gopalaswamy Betta	1,450 m (4,760 ft)	Bandipur National Park	Karnataka		
51	Karimala Gopuram	1,438 m (4,718 ft)	Parambikulam Wildlife Sanctuary	Kerala		
52	Taramati	1,431 m (4,695 ft)	Ahmednagar	Maharashtra		
53	Torna	1,405 m (4,610 ft)	Pune	Maharashtra		
54	Purandar	1,387 m (4,551 ft)	Pune	Maharashtra		
55	Paithalmala	1,372 m (4,501 ft)	Kannur	Kerala		
56	Kodachadri	1,343 m (4,406 ft)	Shimoga	Karnataka		
57	Rajgad	1,318 m (4,324 ft)	Pune	Maharashtra		
58	Sinhagad	1,312 m (4,304 ft)	Pune	Maharashtra		
59	Ratangad	1,297 m (4,255 ft)	Ahmednagar	Maharashtra		
60	Brahmagiri Hill	1,295 m (4,249 ft)	Trimbakeshwar	Maharashtra		
61	Anjaneri	1,284 m (4,213 ft)	Nasik	Maharashtra		
62	Saptashrungi	1,264 m (4,147 ft)	Nasik	Maharashtra		
63	Meenuliyan Para	1,220 m (4,000 ft)	Idukki	Kerala		
64	Sonsogor	1,166 m (3,825 ft)	Sattari	Goa		
65	Vagamon	1,100 m (3,600 ft)	Vagamon	Kerala		
66	Varayadumotta	1,100 m (3,600 ft)	Ponmudi	Kerala		
67	Pratapgad	1,080 m (3,540 ft)	Satara	Maharashtra		
68	Ettina Bhuja	1,050 m (3,440 ft)	Chikkamagaluru	Karnataka		
69	Illikkal Kallu	1,036 m (3,399 ft)	Kottayam	Kerala		Illikkal Kallu
70	Ranipuram	1,016 m (3,333 ft)	Kasarkod	Kerala		
71	Don	1,000 m (3,300 ft)	Dang	Gujarat		
72	Saputara	990 m (3,250 ft)	Dang	Gujarat		
73	Nedumpara Peak	900 m (3,000 ft)	Kollam	Kerala		
74	Wilson Hills	890 m (2,920 ft)	Dharampur	Gujarat		
75	Mahuli	858 m (2,815 ft)	Thane	Maharashtra		
76	Marunthuvazh Malai	830 m (2,720 ft)	Kanyakumari	Tamil Nadu		
77	Raigad	820 m (2,690 ft)	Raigad	Maharashtra		
78	Mangattu Kumban	635 m (2,083 ft)	Thrissur	Kerala		
79	Vagheri Hills	560 m (1,840 ft)	Mhadei Wildlife Sanctuary	Goa		
80	Kodikuthi Mala	522 m (1,713 ft)	Malappuram	Kerala		

== Gallery ==
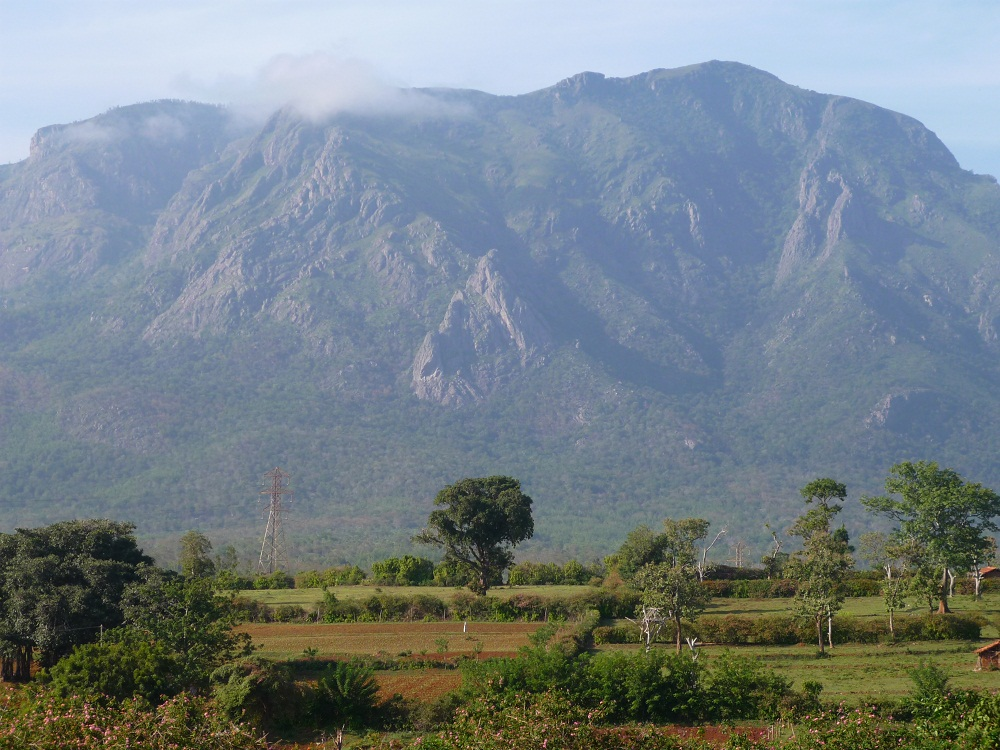
Nilgiris, a part of Western Ghats at Masinangudi, Tamil Nadu

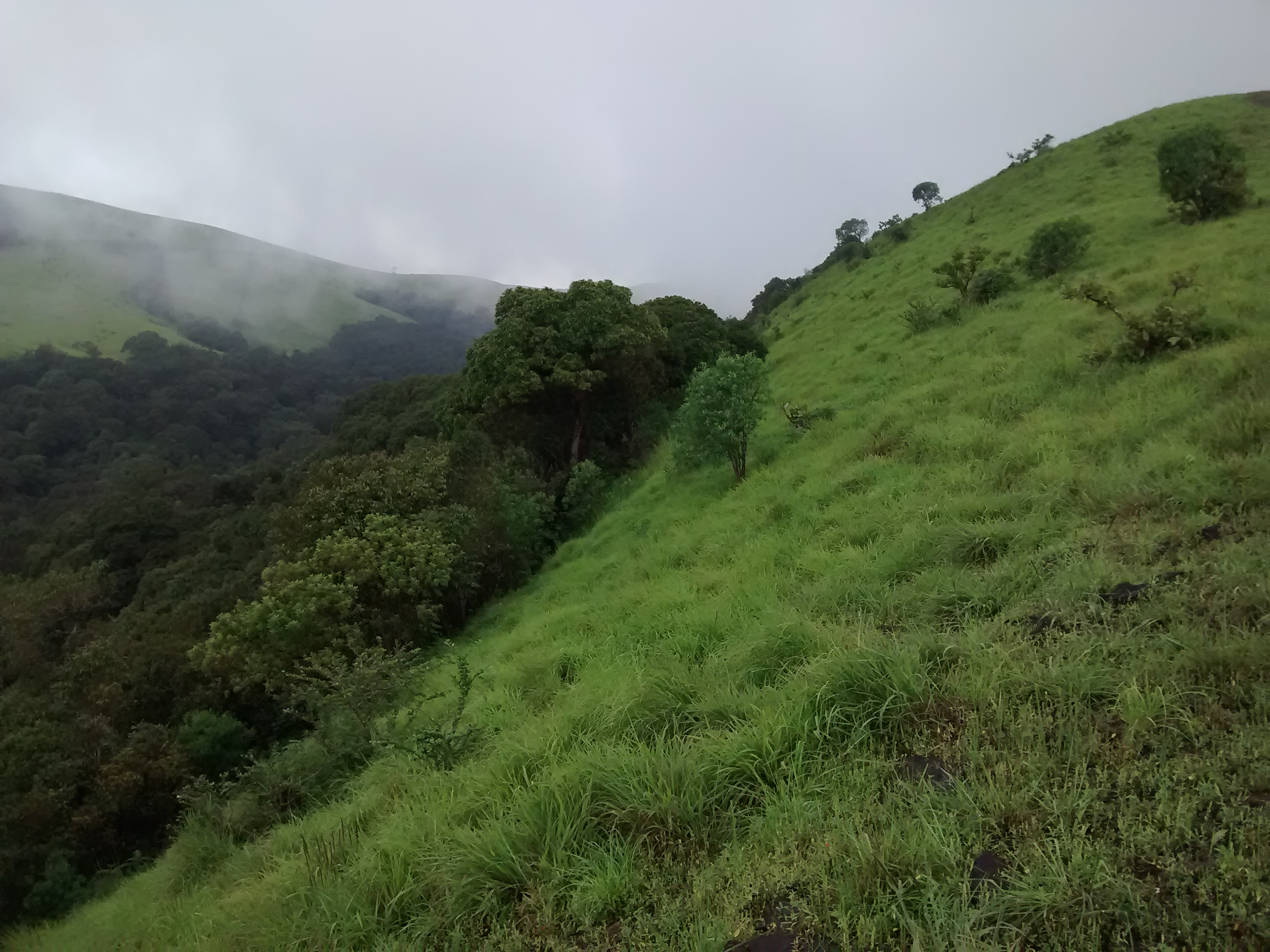
Kodachadri Hills

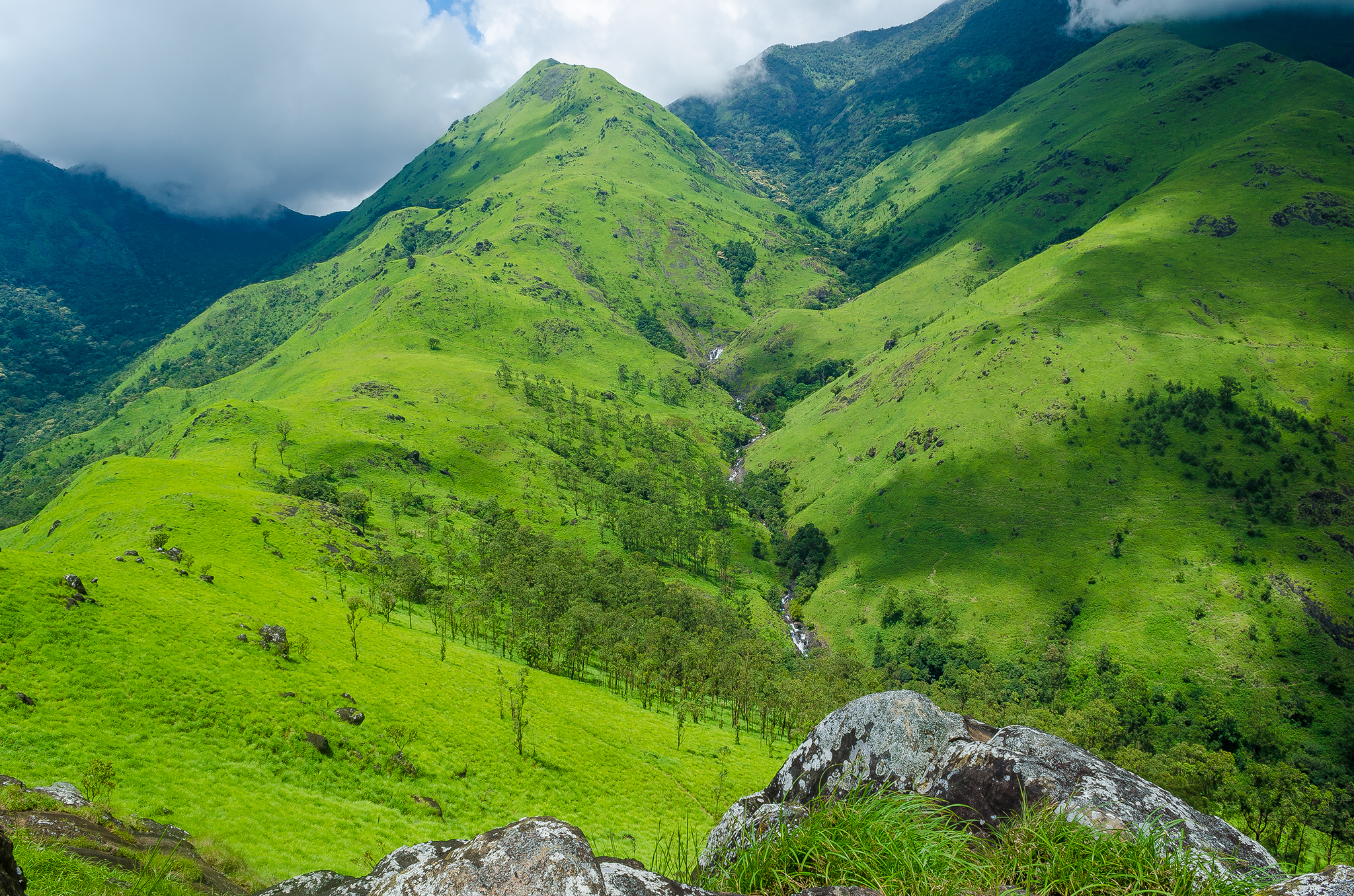
Banasura Hill with cloud covered

Malleswaran in a distant vision

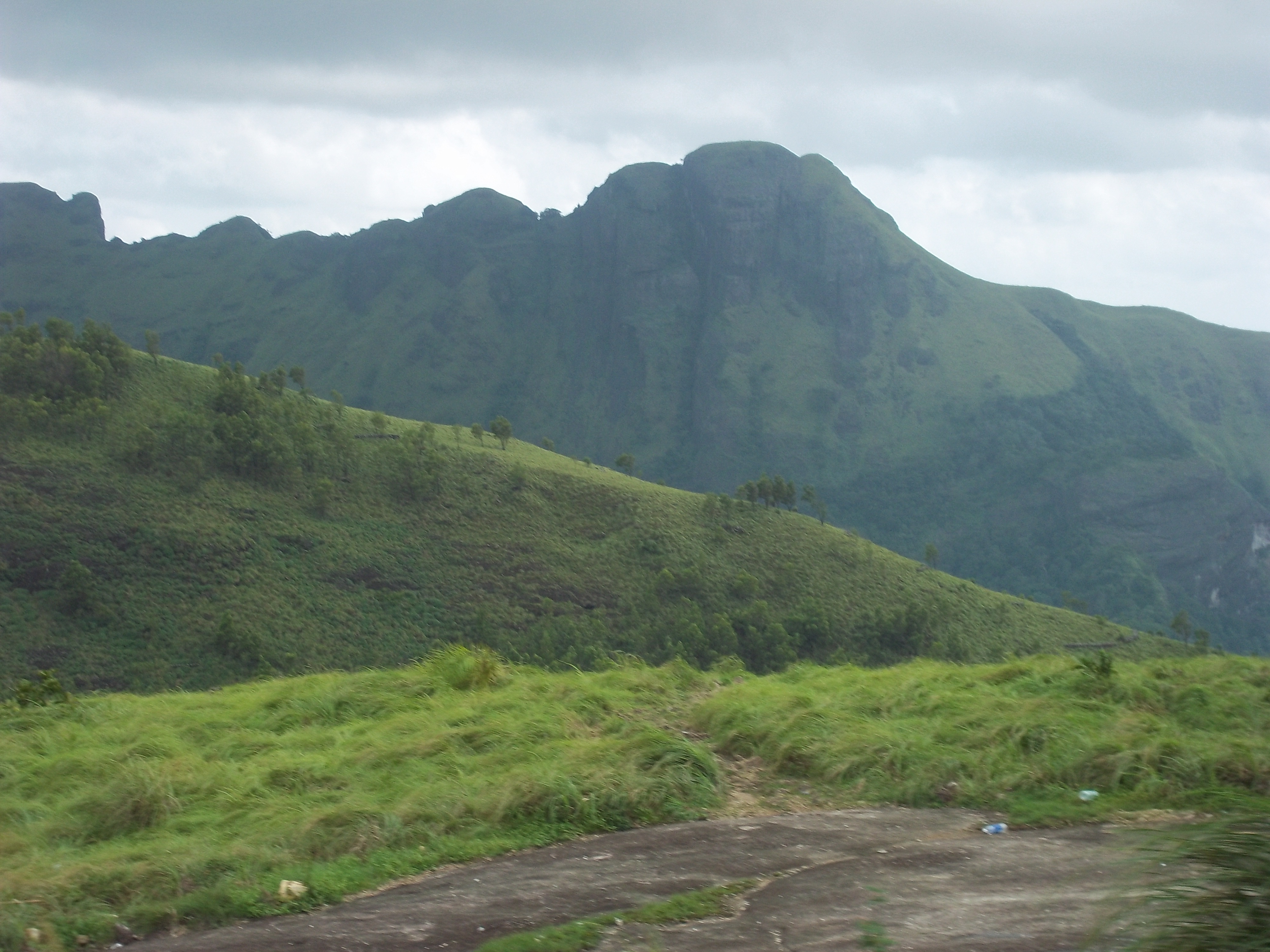
Varayadumotta with 13 peaks
