= List of mountain peaks of Kerala =

List of mountains and freestanding mountains in Kerala state, India. Height of the mountains is given in feet.

Summits of Kerala with at least 500 meters of topographic prominence
Mountain	Height (ft)
Anamudi	8841
Meesapulimala	8661
Malleeswaran Mudi	8455
Mukurthi Mala	8380
Devimala	8273
Kattumala	8100
Kumarikkal Mala	8050
Vagavara Mala	8000
Pambadum Chola	8000
Korumpara	7900
Eravimala	7880
Anginda Mudi	7818
Vayoottumala	7677
Vellarimala	7673
Peradu Mala	7400
Chekkan Mudi	7300
Sispara	7237
Chokramudi	7200
Chemmun Mudi	7100
Koorakakobu Mala	7000
Chembra Mudi	6900
Alliya Mala	6900
Banasura Hill	6762
Kottamala	6624
Karimala	6556
Perumbattikallu	6500
Agastya Mala	6132
Elembileri Mala	6032
Meenamala	5690
Koyil Mala	5272
Kurichipandi Mala	5271
Changumala	5105
Thanottumala	5095
Pulamala	4927
Aladi Mala	4777
Karimala Gopuram	4721
Ambarimedu	4566
Nandavaram Mudi	4557
Nattavaram Mala	4553
Mottumala	4509
Vaithalmala	4500
Vantholan Mala	4040
Kakkiyar Mala	4028
Varappilly Kunnu	4010
Kalladikkodu Mala	4000
Mudiyan Para	3996
Mookkottumudi	3954
Kanchili Kunnu	3952
Pamba Mala	3869
Vellakkalli Mala	3824
Sabarimala	3790
Kadama Mala	3723
Mahalivadan Mala	3691
Poomala	3665
Valvara Mala	3535
Mookkunni Mala	3525
Muthiramala	3417
Ambukuthi Mala	3280
Pandimudi	3174
Pulippachal Mala	3062
Kudikkal Kunnu	3058
Velimudi	3045
Ponmudi	3039
Valeru Mala	3028
Karungoli Mala	3003
Kudayathoor Mala	3000
Elappilly Mala	3000
Poothadan Mudi	2989
Nedumpara Peak	2921
Cherppumdi	2900
Chandimudi	2852
Padikkattumala	2788
Pandampara	2441
Karadimala	2199
Kurakampara	2104
Karimala	2084
Mangattu Kumban	2083
Anaykkal	2080
Mecheri Mala	2000
Nellikkamala	2000
Chekkumala	1970
Thenkanattu Mudi	1954
Kodamala	1953
Venkalppara	1851
Pranakkodu Mala	1792
Achan Kovil	1750
Ayiravalli Mala	1730
Munippara	1716
Eerodumala	1567
Kottappara Mala	1500

Free standing mountains in Kerala
Mountain	Height (ft)
Cheriyam mountain/pandallur hills	2011
Amminikkadan hills/kodikuthimala	1781
Purali mala	1633
Arimbra hills/Oorakam mala	1558
Anangan mala	1535

There are five free standing mountains in Kerala. That is, the mountains far from the Western Ghats. Although these 5 mountains are far from the Western Ghats, they are all a branch of the Western Ghats.

== See also ==
- List of mountains in India
- List of rivers in Kerala
- List of highest point in Kerala by districts
