= Cardamom Hills =

Mountain range in Kerala, India

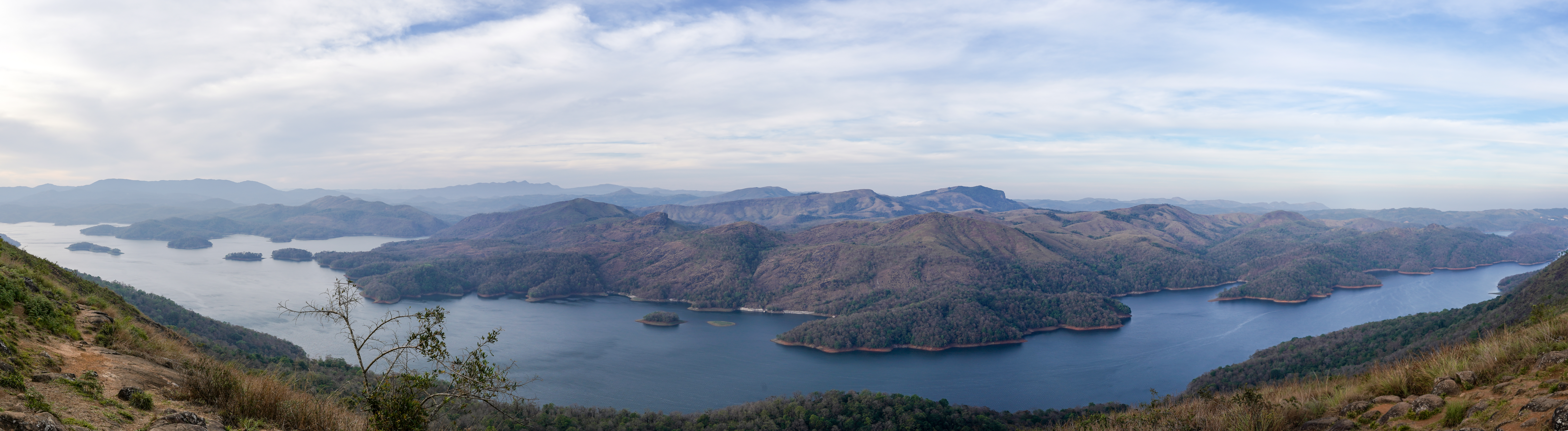
- Cardamom Hills with Idukki Reservoir. Looking SSW. Taken from Kalvary Mount.

Highest point
- Elevation: 2,695 m (8,842 ft)
- Coordinates: 9°52′0″N 77°09′0″E

Naming
- Language of name: Malayalam

Geography
- Location within Kerala
- Location: Kerala, India
- Parent range: Western Ghats

Geology
- Rock age(s): Cenozoic, 100 to 80 mya
- Mountain type(s): Fault (Archaean continental collision)

Climbing
- Easiest route: SH 19, SH 33 (Satellite view)

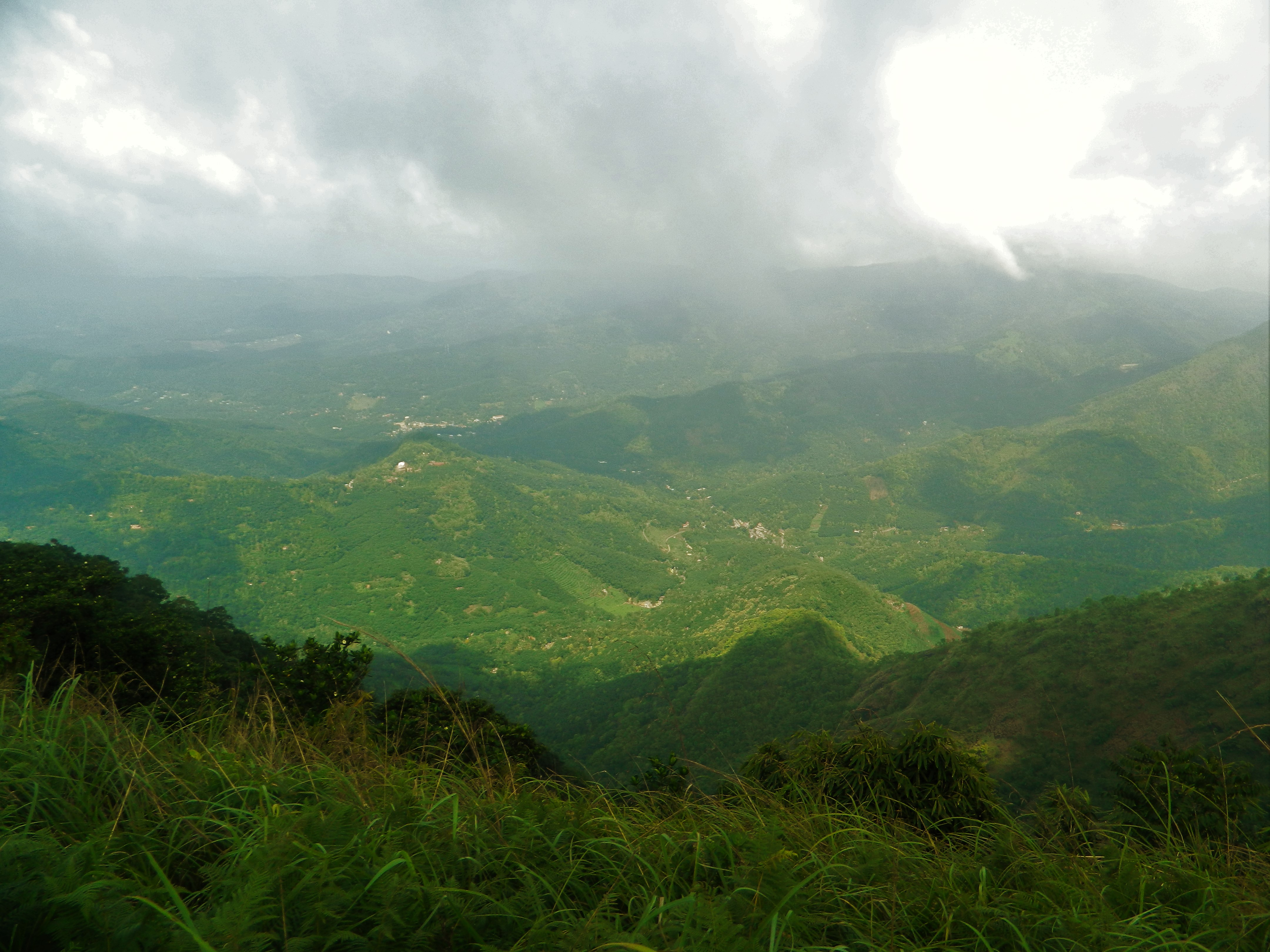
Cardamom Hills western slope as seen from Vagamon, Kerala

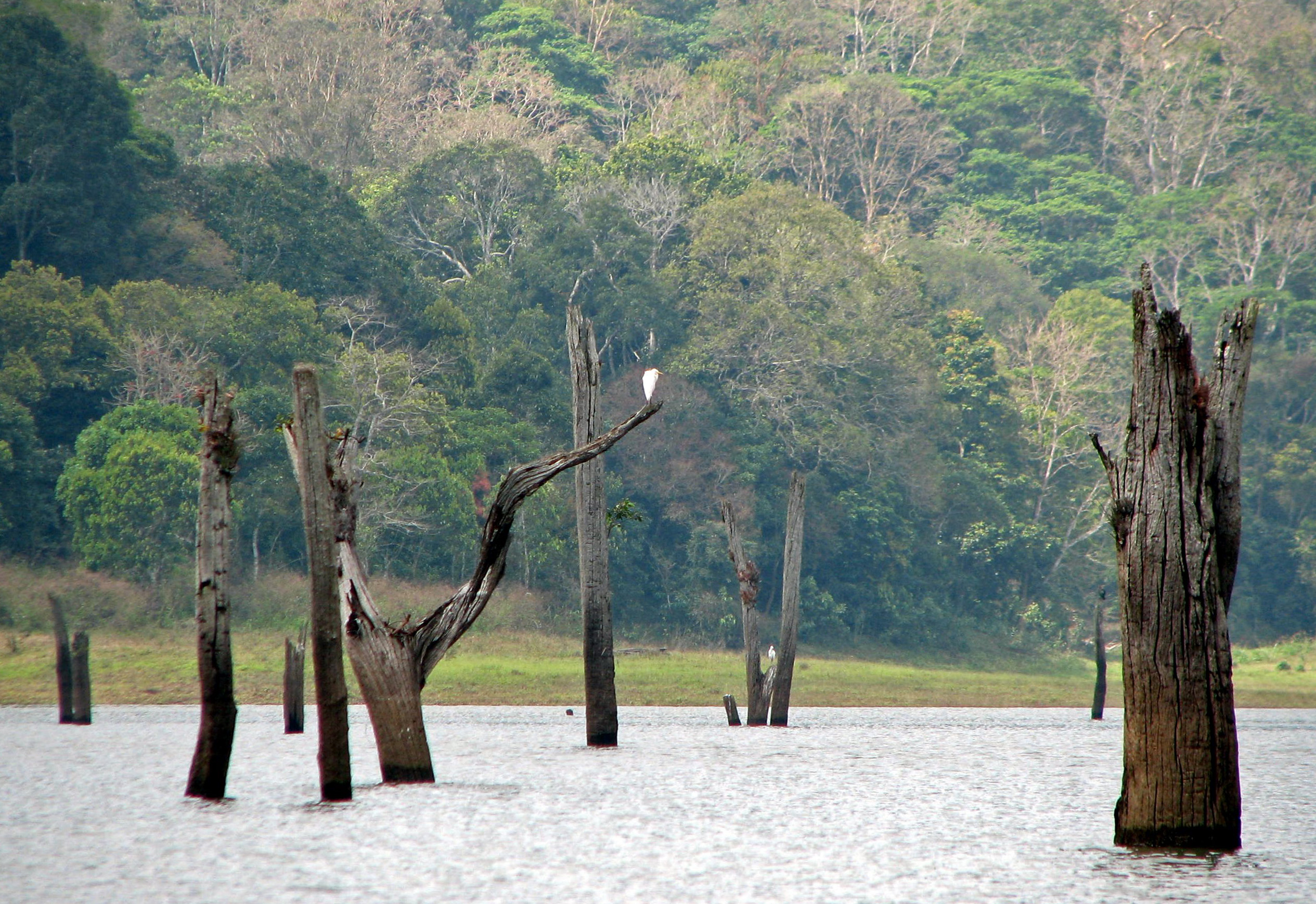
Periyar National Park

The Cardamom Hills or Yela Mala are mountain range of southern India and part of the southern Western Ghats located in Idukki district, Kerala, India. Their name comes from the cardamom spice grown in much of the hills' cool elevation, which also supports pepper and coffee. The Western Ghats and Periyar Sub-Cluster including the Cardamom Hills are UNESCO World Heritage Sites.

== Geography ==
The Cardamom Hills central point is about 9°52′N 77°09′E. They cover about 2,800 km^{2} of mountainous terrain with deep valleys, and includes the drainages of the west flowing Periyar, Mullayar and Pamba rivers. It includes Idukki Dam and Mullaperiyar Dam. They conjoin the Anaimalai Hills to the northwest, the Palani Hills to the northeast and the Pothigai to the south as far as the Aryankavu pass (at c. 9° N). The crest of the hills form the boundary between Kerala and Tamil Nadu. Anamudi (8,842 ft (2,695 m)) in Eravikulam National Park, is the highest peak in Western Ghats and also the highest point in India south of the Himalayas.

=== Climate ===
The hills experience average daily temperatures of 15 °C in winter to 31 °C in summer (April–May). The annual rainfall of 2,000 mm to 3,000 mm in Periyar decreases to less than 1,500 mm in the east in Srivilliputtur Wildlife Sanctuary. On the western side, two-thirds of the precipitation is received during the southwest monsoon from June to September. The areas also receive rainfall from the northeast monsoon (October–December) and from pre-monsoon showers (April–May).

=== Peaks in Cardamom Hills ===
Elevation ranges between 300–2,700 metres (980–8,860 ft) and 2,695 metres (8,842 ft) above MSL.

There are several named peaks over 2,000 metres (6,600 ft) in the mountain range including:

Name	Altitude	Location
Anamudi	2,695 metres (8,842 ft)	Eravikulam National Park
Meesapulimala	2,640 metres (8,660 ft)	Munnar
Kattumala	2,552 metres (8,373 ft)	Idukki
Devimala	2,523 metres (8,278 ft)	Devikulam
Kumarikkal Mala	2,522 metres (8,274 ft)	Chinnar Wildlife Sanctuary
Eravimala	2,400 metres (7,900 ft)	Munnar
Nandala Mala	2,372 metres (7,782 ft)	Marayur
Kottakombu Mala	2,144 metres (7,034 ft)	Chinnar Wildlife Sanctuary
Kottamala	2,019 metres (6,624 ft)	Thekkady
Karimkulam	2,585 metres (8,481 ft)	Munnar
Pambadum Chola	2,438 metres (7,999 ft)	Vattavada
Karimala	2,100 metres (6,900 ft)	Idukki
Devicolam	2,130 metres (6,990 ft)	Devikulam
Vagavara	2,400 metres (7,900 ft)	Idukki
Anchanad	2,164 metres (7,100 ft)	Idukki
Peradu Mala	2,225 metres (7,300 ft)	Idukki
Ghudoor	2,408 metres (7,900 ft)	Idukki
Kabula	2,195 metres (7,201 ft)	Idukki
Mukuthi Mala	2,560 metres (8,400 ft)	Munnar

== Biome protection ==
These hills are made up largely of several contiguous protected areas intended to restrict human access, protect specific endangered species and preserve some of the still undeveloped forest biomes. The central part of the hills comprise the Periyar Wildlife Sanctuary covering an area of 777 km^{2}. The 350 km^{2} core zone of the sanctuary is the Periyar National Park and Tiger Reserve. Periyar is a major ecotourism destination.

To the south of the Periyar Tiger Reserve are the reserve forests of the Ranni, Konni and Achankovil Forest Divisions. The Srivilliputtur Wildlife Sanctuary and reserved forests of the Tirunelveli Forest Division are contiguous with Periyar on the eastern side of the hills in Tamil Nadu in the rain-shadow area with mostly drier forests. The Meghamalai reserve forest, also contiguous with Periyar, is proposed to be the 600 km^{2} Meghamalai Wildlife Sanctuary to protect several threatened species including: Bengal tiger, Indian elephant, Nilgiri tahr, lion-tailed macaque, slender loris, grizzled giant squirrel, Salim Ali's fruit bat, great Indian hornbill, Hutton's pitviper and Vindhyan bob butterfly.

=== Cardamom Hill Reserve ===
The Cardamom Hill was an administrative area under two revenue officers (Tahasildar) created by the royal proclamation of Kingdom of Travancore in April 1822 to promote cardamom cultivation and to give facilities and protection to cardamom farmers. The Cardamom Hill Reserve (CHR) is within the Cardamom Hills Idukki District. It comprises about 15,721 acres (63.62 km^{2}) as per 1897 royal proclamation of the Kingdom of Travancore. But the extent of land in accordance with the boundaries of the notification is about 334 Sq miles (2,13,720 acres). It is bordered by the Tamil Nadu border to the east, Periyar Wildlife Sanctuary on the south, the Periyar River on the west, and Bodimettu, Chokkanad and Muthirapuzha to the north. The rain forests of CHR are a natural wildlife corridor to Periyar National Park from the Anaimalai Hills and Palani hills of Tamil Nadu and is the catchment area of six major hydro-electric projects in Idukki District. Now it is situated in the Idukki District of Kerala.

According to the Chief Secretary of the Government of Kerala, Cardamom Hill land is Government land under the control of the Revenue Department for more than a century. The total extent of the Cardamom Hill area was 1,071.9746 km^{2} (264,890.7 acres) of which 568.6 km^{2} (140,500 acres) was assigned under various Land Assignment Rules. The balance of 503.38 km^{2} (124,390 acres) is leased to farmers for cardamom cultivation The CHR accounts for about 70 percent of the cardamom production of India. CHR contains the Cardamom Research Station, situated in the Pampadumpara village of Udumbanchola taluk. It is located on the eastern side of Kumily-Munnar road. See:map.

CHR is the centre of a controversy between the Forest Department and the Revenue Department over control of the cardamom plantations in the reserve. Non-cardamom cultivation, illegal land conversion and large scale destruction of trees in the CHR have been blamed for flash-floods and landslips in Idukki and siltation problems in the Idukki dam.

According to the report dated 7 September 2005 of the Central Empowered Committee, appointed by the Supreme Court of India, the status of the Cardamom Hill Reserve is forest, and the extent is about 334 sq miles. The CEC concludes that in the Cardamom Hill Reserve, which still holds dense forest, illegal assignment of lands or grant of patta, illegal sales of land, large scale encroachments, transfer and sale of land and consequent deforestation, by the rich, the powerful and the influential, continue unabated in gross violation of the Forest (Conservation) Act, 1980 and this Honourable Court’s order dated 12 December 1996. This is causing irretrievable and immense loss to the dense evergreen forest holding rich bio-diversity on steep slopes and destroying the watersheds, water catchments and streams and rivers which flow through these forests.
