= List of districts of Kerala by highest point =

This is the list of the highest points of the Districts of Kerala

== District ==
Rank	District	Peak	Range/Region	Height (m)	Height (ft)	Coordinates	Location (political)	Source
1	Idukki	Anamudi	Anaimalai Hills	2,695	8,842	10°10′11.10″N 77°3′41.37″E	Munnar Panchayat, Devikulam Taluk, Idukki / Kuttampuzha Panchayat, Kothamangalam Taluk, Ernakulam	It is the highest point in South India that is located in the southern region of Eravikulam National Park at the junction of the Cardamom Hills, the Anaimalai Hills, and the Palani Hills.
2	Ernakulam	Anamudi	Anaimalai Hills	2,695	8,842	10°10′11.10″N 77°3′41.37″E	Kuttampuzha Panchayat, Kothamangalam Taluk, Ernakulam / Munnar Panchayat, Devikulam Taluk, Idukki	Anamudi lies on the border of Idukki and Ernakulam district after the transfer of Kuttampuzha panchayat from Idukki to Ernakulam district
3	Malappuram	Unnamed point	Nilgiri escarpment	2,594	8,511	11°18′3.44″N 76°32′43.75″E	Karulai Panchayat, Nilambur Taluk, Malappuram / Kundah Taluk, Nilgiris, Tamil Nadu	The highest point is along the border with Tamil Nadu on the edge of the Nilgiri escarpment. It is less than 2 km NW from Kolaribetta, the second highest summit of the Nilgiris.
4	Palakkad	Anginda	Nilgiri section of the Western Ghats	2,383	7,818	11°11′15.64″N 76°27′30.35″E	Pudur Panchayat, Mannarkkad Taluk, Palakkad / Kundah Taluk, Nilgiris, Tamil Nadu	Anginda peak situated on the Tamil Nadu border. It is located near the head of the Kunti river in Silent Valley.
5	Kozhikode	Vavul Mala	Vellarimala range, Western Ghats	2,339	7,674	11°25′37.26″N 76°07′51.87″E	Thiruvambady Panchayat, Thamarassery Taluk, Kozhikode / Chungathara Panchayat, Nilambur Taluk, Malappuram	The hill resembles a camel's humpback. Situated on the Kozhikode-Malappuram border. It is separated from the Nilgiri hills by the Chaliyar river valley.
6	Wayanad	Vellarimala	Vellarimala range, Western Ghats	2,240	7,349	11°27′05.87″N 76°08′34.22″E	Meppadi Panchayat, Vythiri Taluk, Wayanad / Thiruvambady Panchayat, Thamarassery Taluk, Kozhikode / Pothukal Panchayat, Nilambur Taluk, Malappuram	The highest peak in the Wayanad district is located at the tri-junction of Wayanad, Kozhikode and Malappuram districts, less than 3 km away from Vavul Mala.
7	Pathanamthitta	Devar Mala	Achenkovil Range, Cardamom Hills.	1,923	6,309	9°11′21.98″N 77°14′45.13″E	Seethathodu Panchayat / Aruvappulam Panchayat, Konni Taluk, Pathanamthitta	It is last major relief above 1600m before Shenkottah gap.
8	Thiruvananthapuram	Agastyarkoodam (shared with Tamil Nadu)	Pothigai hills, Southern Hills	1,868	6,128	8°36′58.64″N 77°14′44.62″E	Kallikkad Panchayat / Kuttichal Panchayat, Kattakada Taluk, Thiruvananthapuram / Ambasamudram Taluk, Tirunelveli, Tamil Nadu	It borders the Kalakkad Mundanthurai Tiger Reserve and Neyyar Wildlife Sanctuary. Famous for annual trek prior to Sivarathri. Highest peak south of 7 km wide Schenkottah gap.
9	Kollam	Karimalai Kadakal (Pandimotta)	Cardamom Hills near Aryankavu Pass	1,758	5,768	8°48′27.78″N 77°13′55.12″E	Kulathupuzha Panchayat, Punalur Taluk, Kollam / Ambasamudram Taluk, Tirunelveli, Tamil Nadu	Situated within Western Ghats on the border with Tamil Nadu. The peak is situated almost 21 km directly north of Agastyamala.
10	Kannur	Karimala	Western Ghats	1,598	5,243	11°56′04.25″N 75°56′09.67″E	Kottiyoor Panchayat, Iritty Taluk, Kannur / Thirunelly Panchayat, Mananthavady Taluk, Wayanad	Located on the border with Wayanad district. It is located about 6 km west of Brahmagiri peak and less than a km south of the Kerala-Karnataka border.
11	Thrissur	Karimala Gopuram	Anaimalai Hills	1,439	4,721	10°21′58.47″N 76°44′48.43″E	Athirappilly Panchayat, Chalakudy Taluk, Thrissur / Nelliyampathy Panchayat, Chittur Taluk, Palakkad	Lies in the southern boundary of Parambikulam Tiger Reserve.
12	Kottayam	Kurisumala	Idukki plateau escarpment	1,195	3,921	9°40′38.63″N 76°53′12.44″E	Teekoy Panchayat, Meenachil Taluk, Kottayam	Kurisumala lies just within the boundaries of Kottayam district, very close to Vagamon in Idukki.
13	Kasaragod	Madathu Mala Peak	Western Ghats	1,046	3,432	12°25′06.97″N 75°21′12.40″E	Panathady Panchayat / Balal Panchayat, Vellarikundu Taluk, Kasaragod	About 1 km from Ranipuram, this peak lies on a ridge extending west from Talacauvery, which is a little more than 15 km away.
14	Alappuzha	Unnamed point	Palamel, Mavelikkara taluk	102	335	9°10′17.40″N 76°40′36.79″E	Palamel Panchayat, Mavelikkara Taluk, Alappuzha	Point right across the Pathanamthitta border from Pazhakulam. This is the only district in Kerala with the highest point lower than 1000m above msl.

== See also ==
- List of Indian states and union territories by highest point
- List of mountains in Kerala
- List of peaks in the Western Ghats
