= Plantation Crops Symposium =

PLACROSYM is the abbreviation for Plantation Crops Symposium, which is a series of scientific conferences held in India at different locations.

== Background ==
A preliminary Symposium on Plantation Crops was as held in 1972 at Trivandrum, which should be accounted as the mother for all later Plantation Crops Symposia. Its proceedings were published 1973 as a supplement to Journal of Plantation Crops. Although this preliminary symposium is entitled First National Symposium on Plantation Crops, it is not counted to the series of the later PLACROSYM's.

Later, in 1978, the title for National Symposium on Plantation Crops was modified as Annual Symposium on Plantation Crops, indicating an annual appearance up to PLACROSYM V.

From PLACROSYM VI, these series of symposia were held biennially at different research institutions engaged in research and development of plantation crops. The objective of this symposium is to provide a common forum for interaction among the scientists and extension officers who are engaged in plantation crops research and development. The symposium also provides the platform for exchanging scientific ideas and technologies developed in various member institutions and to put in a collective thought for the overall development of the plantation sector. Further, it offers opportunity for the young scientists to acquire scientific knowledge and modern technologies through inspiring lectures by experts and participating in thought provoking discussions.

The following research institutes are involved with organizing of different PLACROSYM's:

- Central Plantation Crops Research Institute (CPCRI), Kasaragod - 671 124, Kerala
- Indian Society for Plantation Crops (ISPC), hosted at CPCRI, Kasaragod - 671 124, Kerala
- Central Coffee Research Institute, Balehonnur - 577 117, Karnataka
- Coconut Development Board, Kera Bhavan, Cochin - 682 011, Kerala
- Indian Cardamom Research Institute, Myladumpara - 685 553, Kerala
- Indian Institute of Spices Research (IISR), Kozhikode - 673 012, Kerala
- Indian Society for Spices, hosted at IISR, Kozhikode - 673 012, Kerala
- National Research Centre for Cashew, Puttur - 574 202, Karnataka
- National Research Centre for Oil Palm, Pedavegi - 534 450, Andhra Pradesh
- Rubber Research Institute of India, Kottayam - 686 009, Kerala
- Society for Promotion of Oil Palm Research and Development, NRC for Oil Palm, Pedavegi - 534 450, Andhra Pradesh
- Tocklai Tea Research Institute, Jorhat - 785 008, Assam
- UPASI Tea Research Foundation, Valparai - 642 127, Tamil Nadu

== Symposia ==
Up to now, twenty PLACROSYM meetings have been held:

- PLACROSYM I (20–23 March 1978, Kottayam)
- PLACROSYM II (26–29 June 1979, Ootacamund)
- PLACROSYM III (12–15 December 1980, Cochin)
- PLACROSYM IV (3–5 December 1981, Mysore)
- PLACROSYM V (15–18 December 1982, Kasaragod)
- PLACROSYM VI (16–20 December 1984, Kottayam)
- PLACROSYM VII (16–19 October 1986, Coonoor)
- PLACROSYM VIII (28–30 December 1988, Cochin)
- PLACROSYM IX (5–7 December 1990, Bangalore)
- PLACROSYM X (2–4 December 1992, Kasaragod)
- PLACROSYM XI (30 November–3 December 1994, Calicut)
- PLACROSYM XII (27–29 November 1996, Kottayam)
- PLACROSYM XIII (16–18 December 1998, Coimbatore)
- PLACROSYM XIV (12–15 December 2000, Hyderabad)
- PLACROSYM XV (10–13 December 2002, Mysore)
- PLACROSYM XVI (14–17 December 2004, Kasaragod)
- PLACROSYM XVII (5–8 December 2006, Cochin)
- PLACROSYM XVIII (10–13 December 2008, Puttur)
- PLACROSYM XIX (7–10 December 2010, Kottayam)
- PLACROSYM XX (12–15 December 2012, Coimbatore)
- PLACROSYM XXI (12–15 December 2014, Kozhikode)

Now PLACROSYM has turned into a leading series of international symposia with direct emphasis on plantation crops research.

The next upcoming PLACROSYM XXI will be held in December 2014 at Kozhikode.

Some of the proceedings of PLACROSYM's were published as supplemental issues to Journal of Plantation Crops.
