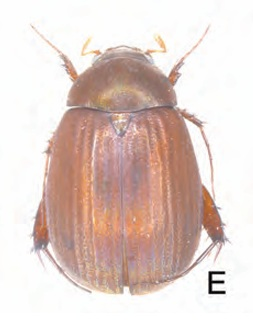

Scientific classification
- Kingdom: Animalia
- Phylum: Arthropoda
- Class: Insecta
- Order: Coleoptera
- Suborder: Polyphaga
- Infraorder: Scarabaeiformia
- Family: Scarabaeidae
- Genus: Maladera
- Species: M. cardamomensis

Binomial name
- Maladera cardamomensis Ahrens & Fabrizi, 2016

= Maladera cardamomensis =

Species of beetle

Maladera cardamomensis is a species of beetle of the family Scarabaeidae. It is found in the Indian states of Kerala and Tamil Nadu.

== Description ==
Adults reach a length of about 9.1–9.9 mm. They have an oval body. The dorsal and ventral surface are reddish brown, while the antennae are yellowish. They are dull, partly with an iridescent shine. Furthermore, the dorsal surface is nearly glabrous, except for some setae on the head.

== Etymology ==
The species is named after its occurrence in the Cardamom Hills.
