= Devar Mala =

Mountain in southern India

Devar Mala ദേവര്‍മല
- Location within Kerala

Highest point
- Elevation: 1,923 m (6,309 ft)
- Listing: List of highest point in Kerala by districts
- Coordinates: 9°11′21.98″N 77°14′45.13″E

Geography
- Location: Konni taluk, Pathanamthitta district, Kerala, India
- Parent range: Western Ghats

Devarmala (Malayalam: ദേവര്‍മല) is a huge peak in the Western Ghats of Kerala. It stands at an altitude of 1,923 m. It is located in Pathanamthitta District of Kerala, right next to the border with Tenkasi district of Tamil Nadu. It is the last of the peaks located just north of the biogeographically important seven kilometers wide "Schencottah Pass" or "Schencottah Gap" or 'Aryankavu Pass'.

Devarmala is situated in the watershed region of Pamba-Achenkovil rivers and is the highest peak in both the Pamba river basin and the Achankovil river basin. It is also the highest point in Pathanamthitta district and the Achenkovil range.

It is the highest peak in the Western Ghats south of Periyar plateau. To the east, lie the Karuppanadhi Dam and the smaller "Adavinainar Dam" situated west off Puliyankudi and Kadayanallur towns of Tamil Nadu. To the south lies Achankovil village of Kollam district.

It is situated in the Konni taluk of Pathnamthitta district, Kerala. Aruvappulam is a nearby town. Sabarimala, Konni and Gavi are the tourist destination on Kerala side and Sengottai, Tenkasi and Courtallam are the tourism places on the Tamil Nadu slopes. Achenkovil range is situated in between Pathanamthitta and Kollam districts. Its total area is 90.285 km^{2}. In the east, this hill range continues as the Chockampatti Hills, that are the southern extension of the Sivagiri hills.

The hill is situated in deep forest and is generally not open for trekking.

== See also ==
- List of peaks in the Western Ghats
- List of highest point in Kerala by districts
