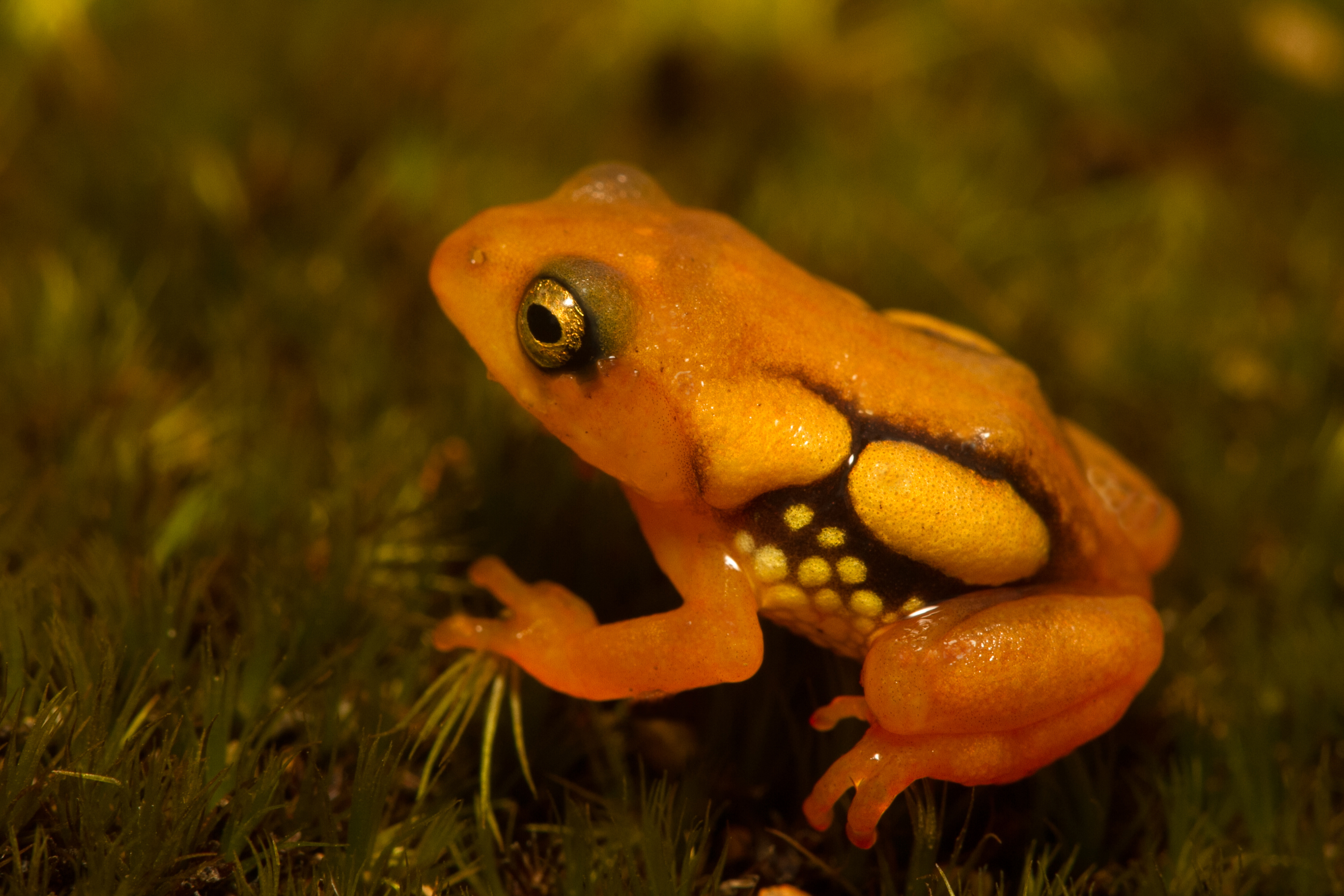

Conservation status
- Critically Endangered (IUCN 3.1)

Scientific classification
- Kingdom: Animalia
- Phylum: Chordata
- Class: Amphibia
- Order: Anura
- Family: Rhacophoridae
- Genus: Raorchestes
- Species: R. resplendens

Binomial name
- Raorchestes resplendens Biju, Shouche, Dubois, Dutta, and Bossuyt, 2010

= Raorchestes resplendens =

Species of amphibian

Raorchestes resplendens, the resplendent shrubfrog, is a critically endangered species of frog belonging to the family Rhacophoridae endemic to the high altitude region around the south Indian peak of Anaimudi. It has extremely short limbs and numerous macroglands and was discovered from the Anamudi summit (2695 m asl) in the Western Ghats of Kerala, India and is known only from the Eravikulam National Park.

== Description ==
Within the generally small Raorchestes, Raorchestes resplendens qualify as medium-sized frogs: males grow to a snout-vent length of 23–25 mm (0.91–0.98 in) and females to 25–28 mm (0.98–1.10 in). Individuals of the species are distinguishable from all members of the genus by their bright reddish orange colour and multiple prominent glandular swellings present laterally behind the eyes, on the side of the dorsum, on the anterior side of the vent, on the dorsal side of forearm and shanks and on the posterior side of the tarsus and metatarsus. The limbs are much shorter than in other Raorchestes. The iris is red.

== Distribution ==
The species was initially thought to live within three km^{2} on the Anamudi summit within the Eravikulam National Park, India but researchers found another site about 20 km away within the same national park. This frog has been observed between 1896 and 2695 meters above sea level, largely in grassland habitats.

== Etymology and systematics ==
The genus Raorchestes is named in honour of C. R. Narayan Rao in recognition of his contribution to Indian batrachology. The scientific nomen Orchestes is based on the first generic nomen coined for frogs of the Philautus group, Orchestes Tschudi 1838. The specific epithet resplendens is a Latin term meaning 'bright coloured, glittering, resplendent' referring to the bright red or orange pigmentation.

While Raorchestes resplendens are morphologically striking and different from other Raorchestes, molecular phylogenetics place them clearly within that genus. This suggests rapid morphological evolution in Raorchestes resplendens.

== Behaviour ==
Raorchestes resplendens have very short limbs, and the species is characterized by pronounced crawling behaviour. It is a ground-dwelling species, while most Raorchestes are typically found on vegetation above the ground, some of them being arboreal.

Raorchestes resplendens females burrow their eggs under the moss-covered forest floor, deep inside the base of bamboo clumps. As mature eggs were found in the oviduct of a female after oviposition, females of this species may mate with more than one male and breed more than once in a single season. Parents do not tend their eggs after oviposition. As is typical for the genus, development is direct, without a free-swimming larval stage. Hatching takes place after about 3–4 weeks. Upon hatching, froglets are fully mobile and measure about 4.5 mm (0.18 in) in snout-vent length.
