= Eravimala =

Mountain in Kerala, India

Eravimala (ഇരവിമല) is the highest peak located in the Anamalai Hills in the Western Ghats, India. It is situated at the Idukki District of Kerala, and stands at 7,880 feet (2,400 m). It is one of the 14 highest peaks in the district which exceed a height of 2,000 metres (6,600 ft) above sea level. The highest one is Anamala (Anamudi) at 8,841 feet (2,695 m). It is the tenth highest peak in South India.

Other prominent peaks (more than 2,000m) in the Idukki district are:

- Anamala
- Devimala
- Karimkulam
- Devicolam
- Kumarikkal
- Kattumala
- Perumal
- Ghudoor
- Sabarimala
- Kabula
- Karimala
- Anchanad
- Chentavara
