= Poomala =

Village in Kerala, India

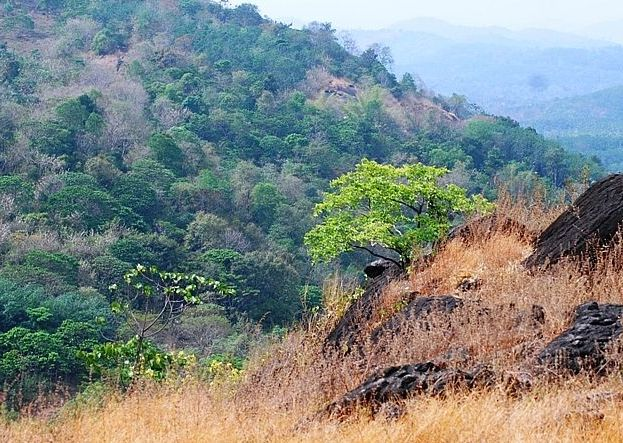
A view from Poomala hill

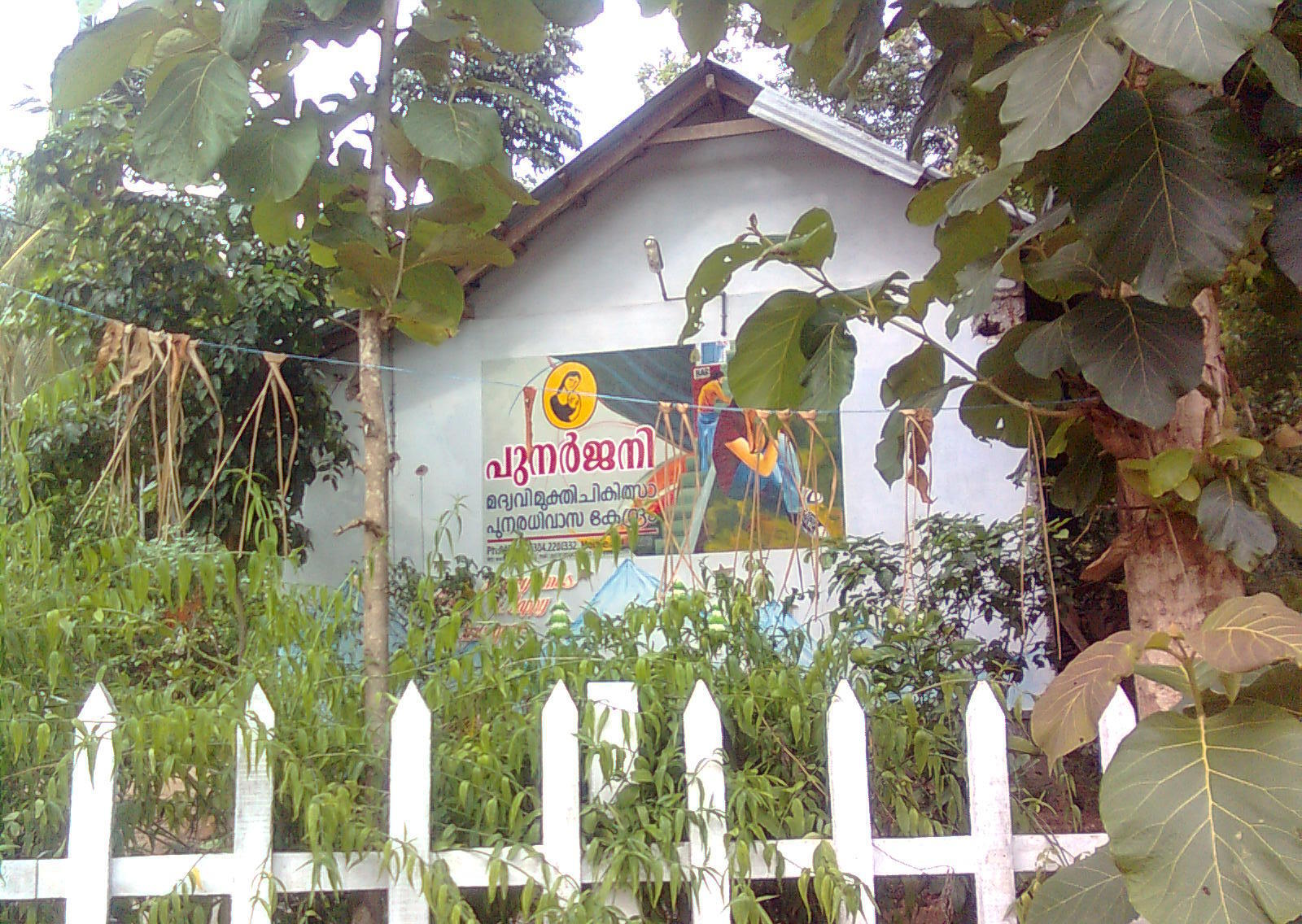
Deaddiction centre in Poomala

Poomala is a village in Thrissur district of Kerala, South India. It is 11 km from the town of Thrissur.

== Etymology ==
Poomala's name comes from the Poovam tree (also called Ceylon oak or Gum-lac tree), which was plentiful here in the past. Residents here also claim that this name comes from 'poovan pazham' (A type of banana) which was grown in large amounts.

== Description ==
Poomala was largely a forest, until the area was occupied by the Christian settlers from central Travancore. It is one of the popular tourist hill stations in India. Attractions include Muniarra (a cave where a saint once meditated). The small dam in the southern part of Poomala was initially built only for irrigation purposes, then managed by the Minor Irrigation Department. Today, it is a growing tourist area as well, as the District Tourism Promotion Councils (DTPC) of Thrissur undertook a 50 lakh project that was launched in 2008 to beautify the environs of the dam. Poomala Dam was officially designated as a tourist centre by the Home Minister of State, Kodiyeri Balakrishnan, on 21 March 2010. The dam is situated 94.50 meters above mean sea level. To its north lies another dam, Pathazhakundu, which presently is oriented only for irrigation. There are some more villages named Parambayi, Poomala, Chottupara. Nowadays these villages are known together as Poomala. The main tourist attractions in and around Poomala are Cheppara caves, Pathazhazhakund dam, Pamboorampara rock etc. Poomala has two schools and an engineering college.

Poomala Fest, a program conducted annually attracts tourists from in and around the district. The program lasts for about a week with food, entertainment and lot more.

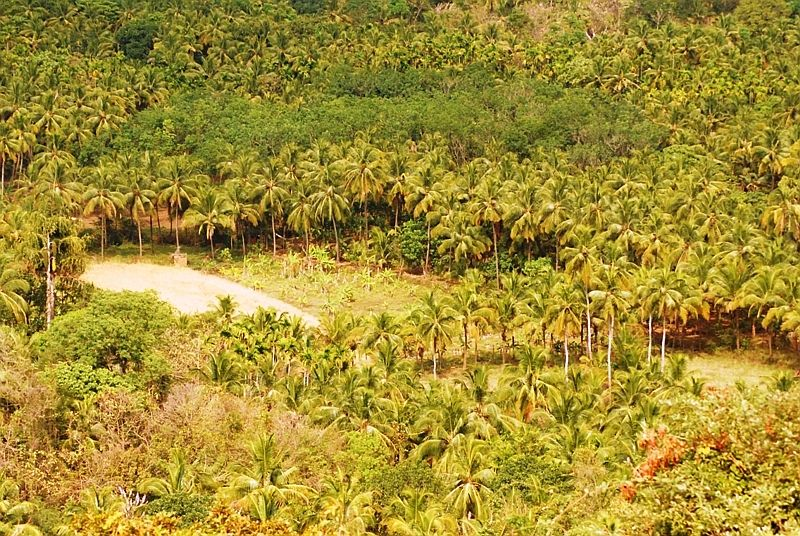
A view from Poomala

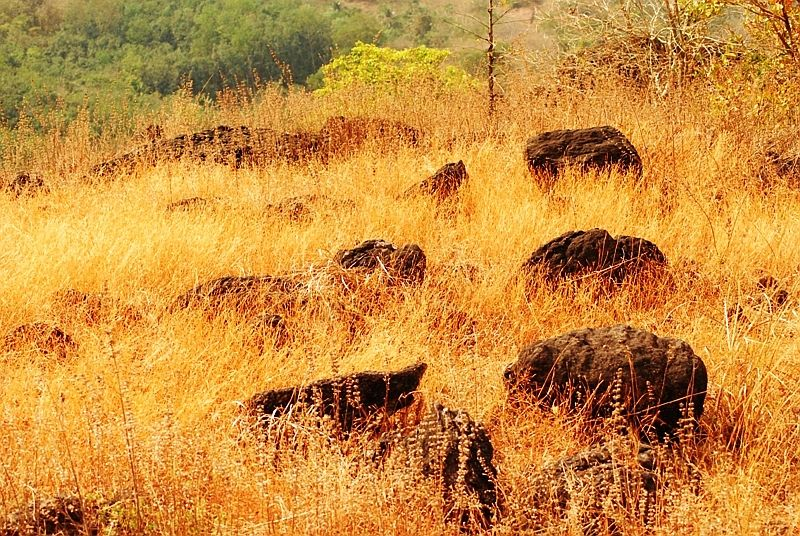
Poomala hill

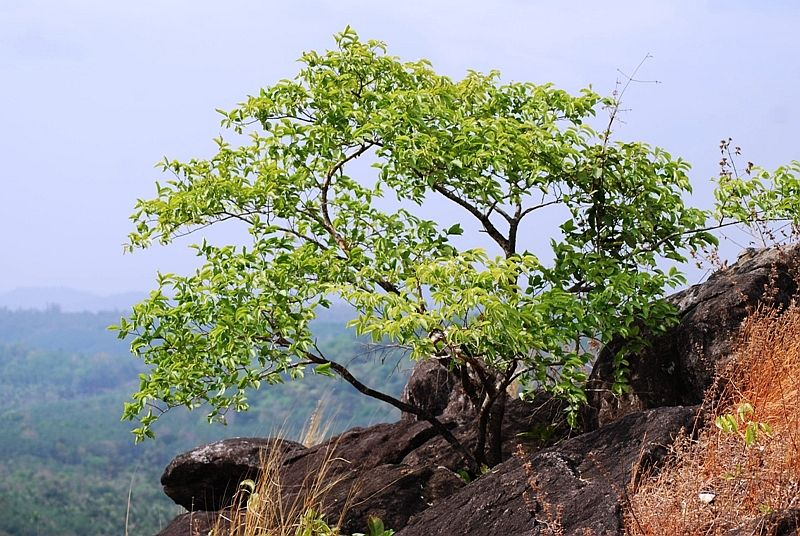
Poomala hill

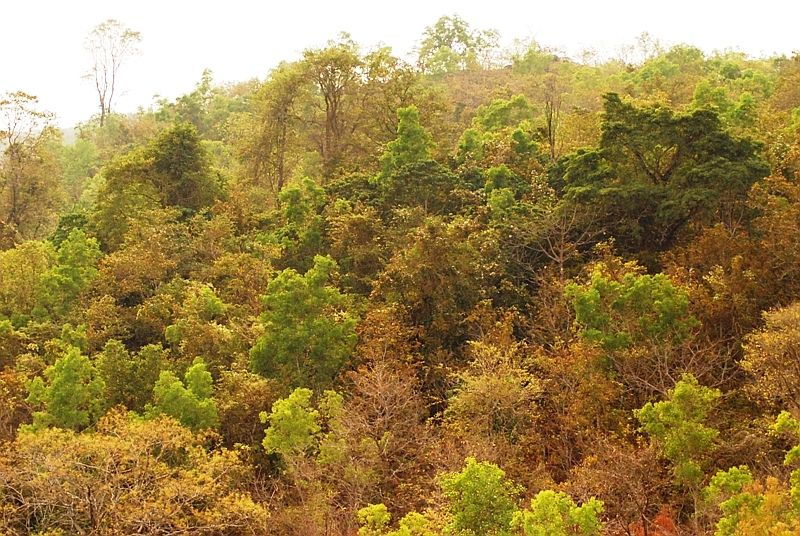
Poomala hill

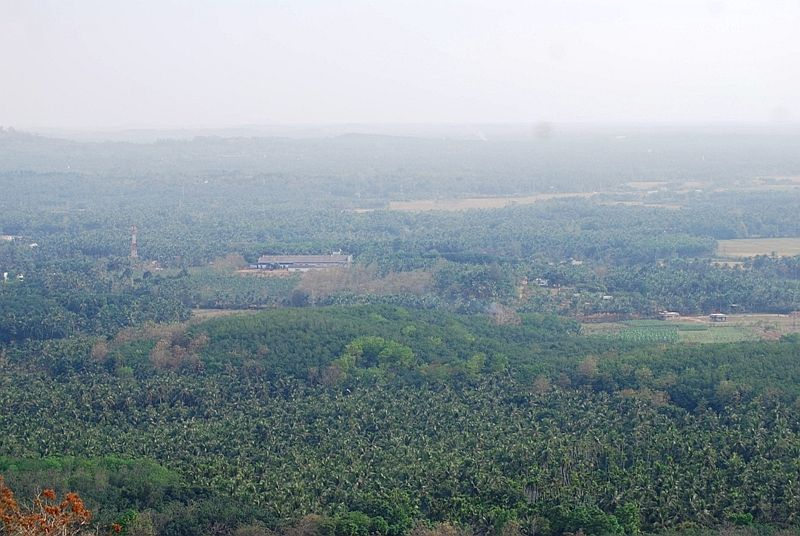
A view from Poomala hill

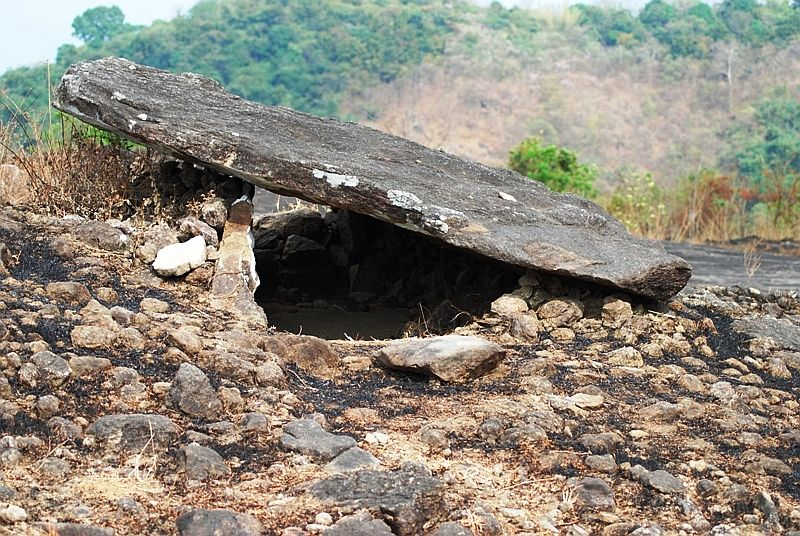
Muniarra (cave where a saint once meditated)

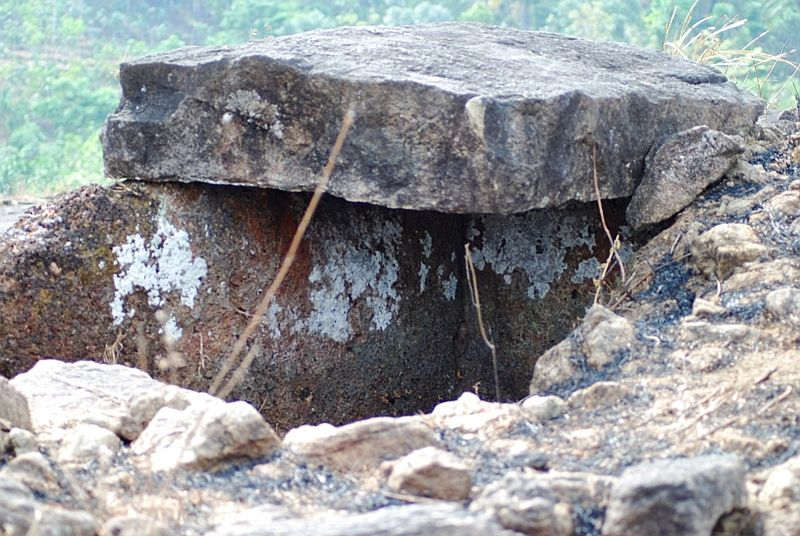
Muniarra (cave where a saint once meditated)
