= Perumal Peak =

High peak at Kodaikanal, Tamil Nadu

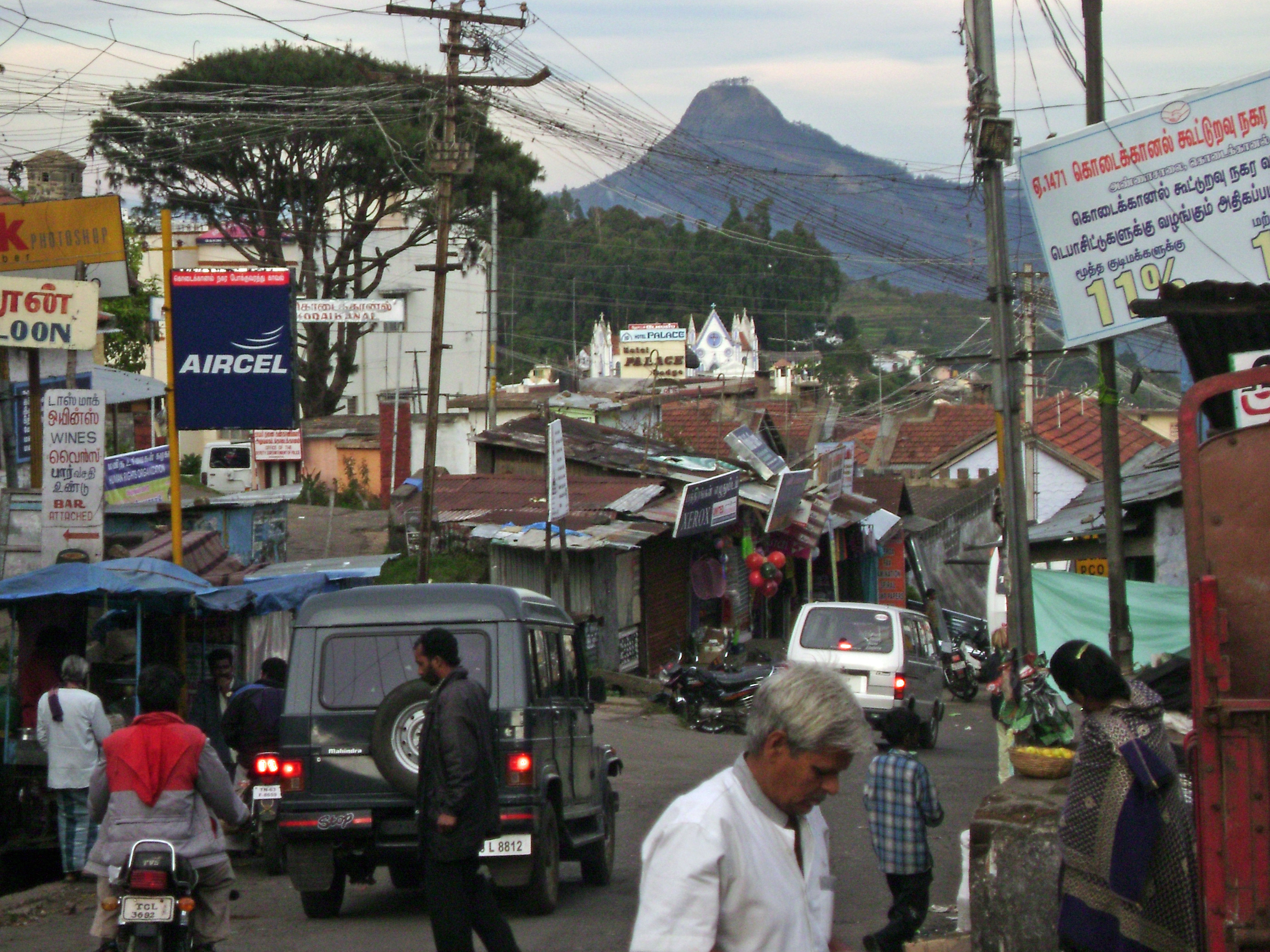
- Perumal Malai in background, as seen from Kodaikanal, 12.5 kilometres (7.8 mi) away

Highest point
- Elevation: 2,234 m (7,329 ft)
- Coordinates: 10°18′01″N 77°33′57″E

Geography
- Location within Tamil Nadu
- Location: Kodaikanal, Tamil Nadu, India
- Parent range: Western Ghats

Climbing
- Easiest route: Hike/scramble

Perumal Peak or Perumal Malai Peak is a high peak at Kodaikanal in the Palani hills, that are a part of the greater Western Ghat mountain range in Tamil Nadu, India, having an elevation of 2,234 metres (7,329 ft). It is a favourite spot for trekkers. This peak divides the upper Palani hills to the west and the lower Palani hills to the east. The Kodaikanal forest department have their communications repeater atop the peak.
