= Aruvappulam =

- Village
- Location in Kerala, India Aruvappulam (India)
- Coordinates: 9°11′0″N 76°51′0″E
- Country: India
- State: Kerala
- District: Pathanamthitta

Population (2011)
  - Total: 13,801

Languages
  - Official: Malayalam, English
- Time zone: UTC+5:30 (IST)
- PIN: 6XXXXX
- Vehicle registration: KL-83
- Nearest city: Konni
- Lok Sabha constituency: Pathanamthitta
- Vidhan Sabha constituency: Konni

Aruvappulam is a remote village in the south eastern corner of Pathanamthitta district in the state of Kerala, India. Aruvappulam is a grama panchayat (village council) within Konni Thaluk. The highest point in the district Devar Mala is situated in the village. A sizeable portion of the village is within Konni Reserve Forest. The village shares a border with Tamil Nadu, but there is no interstate road connecting the village with the neighbouring state.

The major streams that flow into the Achankovil river originate in the village. The river forms the border between village and the neighbouring district of Kollam.

The major settlements within the village are Kokkathode and Kalleli.

== Demographics ==
At the 2011 India census, Aruvappulam had a population of 13,801 (6,463 males and 7,338 females).

There is a significant Scheduled caste population in the village (15%) and a significant Christian population in the village.

There is a strong trend of migration to Gulf Cooperation Council countries and the United States from the village. An expatriate named KP George ran for the United States Congress in Texas in 2011.
