= Varayadumotta =

Mountain peak in southern India

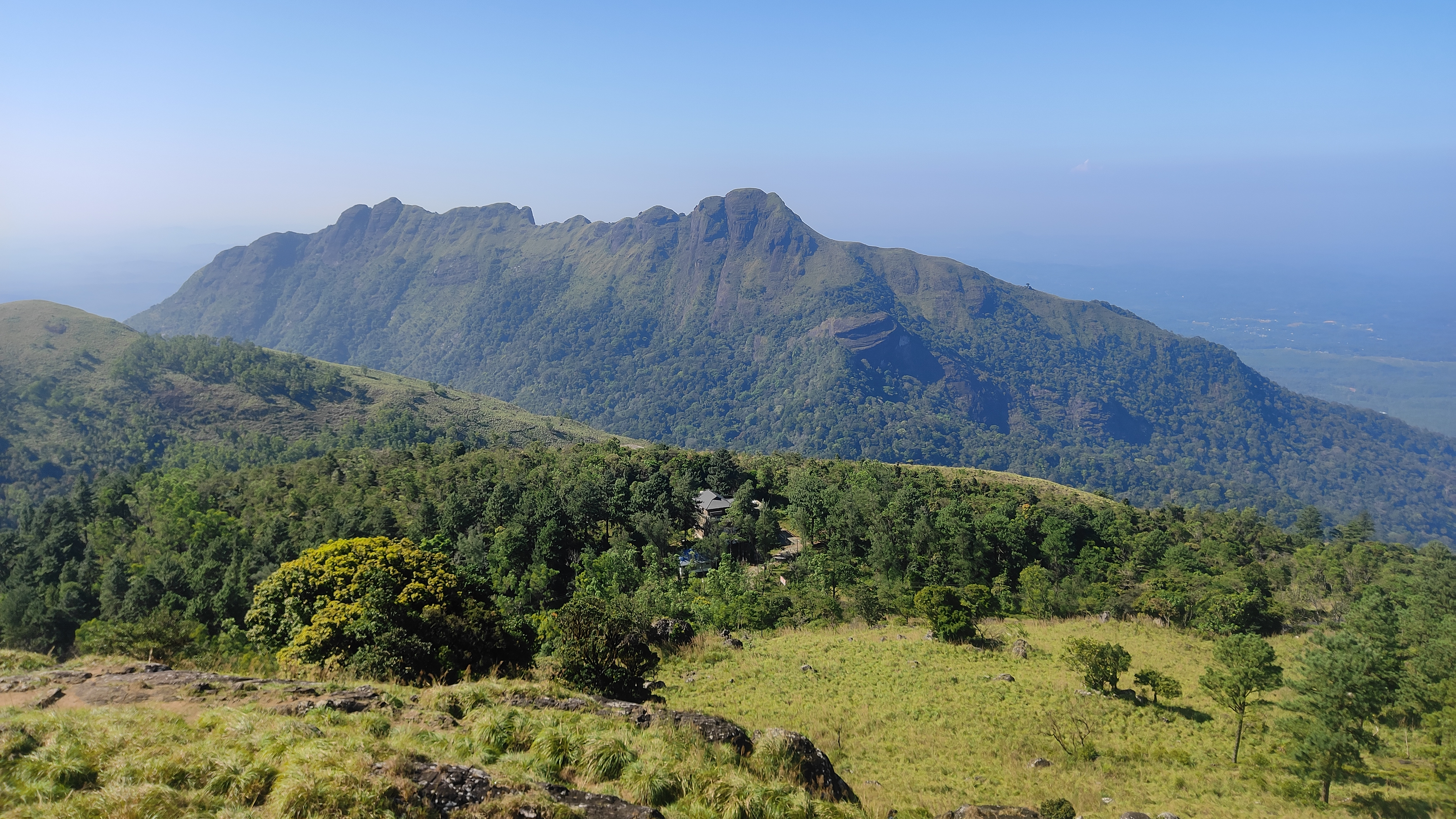
Varayadumotta view from Ponmudi

Varayadumotta (Malayalam: വരയാടുമൊട്ട) is the tallest peak in the Ponmudi mountain range (Western ghats), Nedumangad taluk, Thiruvananthapuram, Kerala, India. As its name come from Nilgiri tahr / Varayadu. It is one of the isolated place which is favourable home for mountain goats (Nilgiri Tahr) in acute population. These mountain range is also known as Varayadumudi and Varayattumutti.

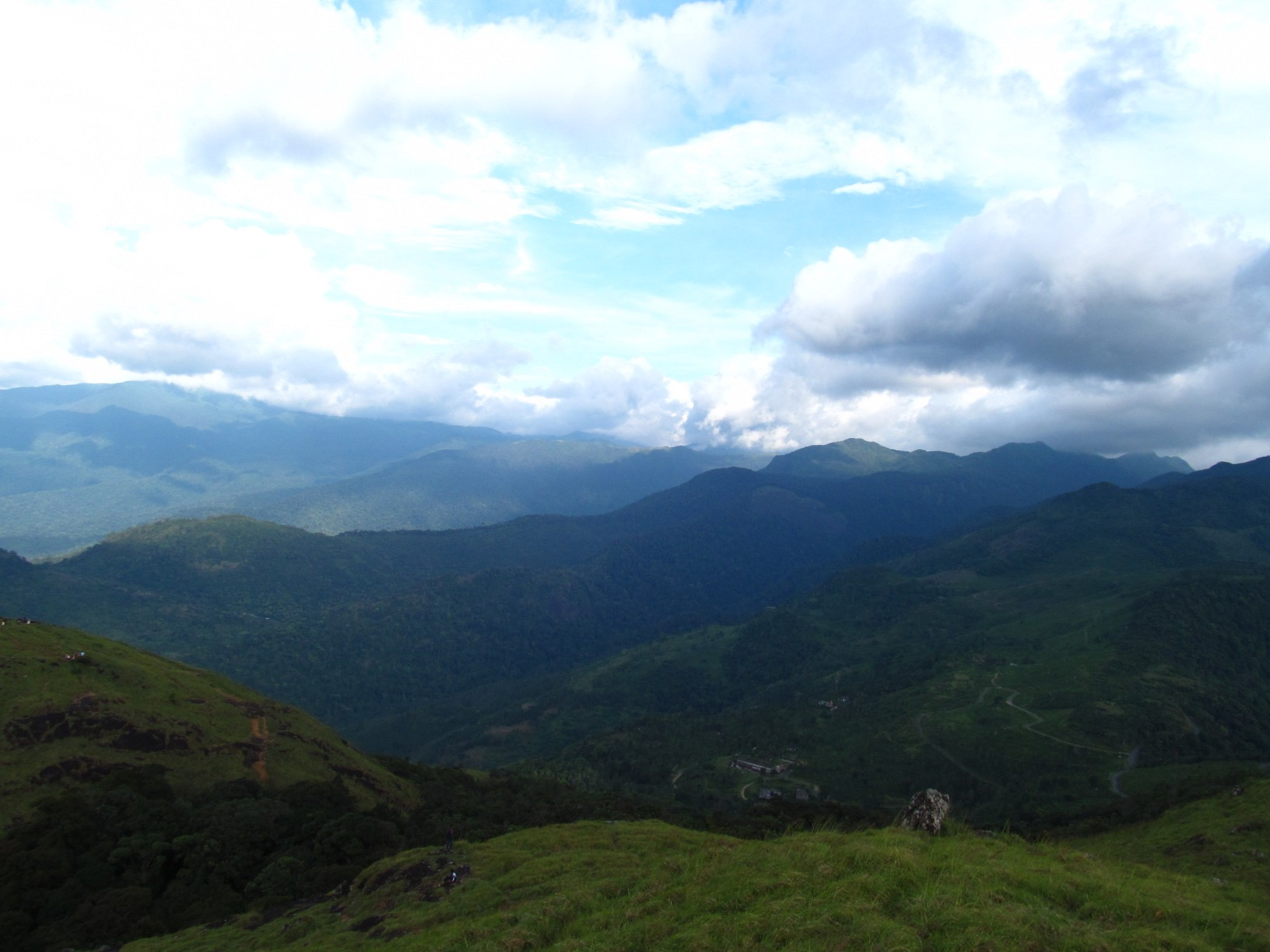
Ponmudi view in Varayadumotta

It stands about a height of about 1100 m. Varying elevation and peculiar shape of these hill is unique in the world. It is a protected mountain ridge situated in between Ponmudi hills, Palode (Brimore) hills and Kallar valley. It includes 13 peaks and the second peak is the highest peak in Varayadumotta. It is third adventurous trekking in South India after Meesapulimala and Agastyarkoodam.

Popular tourist spots near to Varayadumotta peak include Kallar river, Ponmudi, Meenmutty waterfalls, Manakayam waterfalls and Brimore estate. It is 40 km away from Thiruvananthapuram city.
