= Padagiri =

Coordinates: 10°28′46″N 76°42′5″E

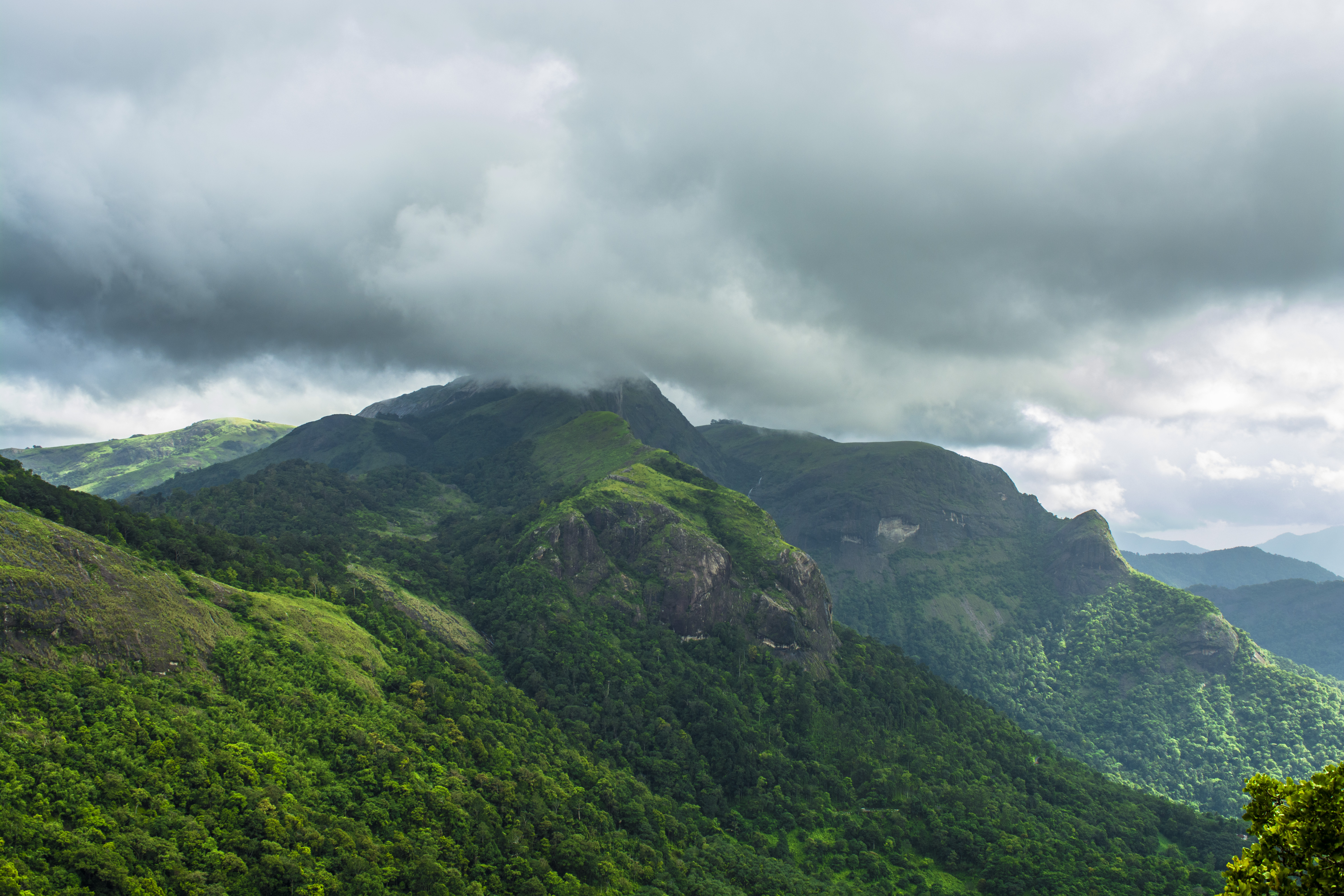
Padagiri

Padagiri, also known as Nellikota, is a hill in the Nelliyampathy Hills, in Chittur Taluk, Palakkad District, Kerala, and is the range's tallest peak, with an elevation of 1585m. It is around six kilometres from Nelliampathy. Nearby similar peaks are Vellichamudi, Valiyana, Velavanchan and Mayanmudi. The hill is particularly famed for its tall teak trees and the plantations featuring them.
