= Journal of Plantation Crops =

- Discipline: Agricultural Science
- Language: English
- Edited by: V. Krishnakumar

Publication details
- History: 1973-present
- Publisher: Indian Society for Plantation Crops (India)
- Frequency: Triannually

Standard abbreviations
- ISO 4: J. Plant. Crops

Indexing
- CODEN: JPCRDW
- ISSN: 0304-5242
- OCLC no.: 2245591

Links
- Online tables of contents and abstracts, 1973-2007

The Journal of Plantation Crops is a triannual peer-reviewed scientific journal and is the official publication of the Indian Society for Plantation Crops. The scope includes are topics relating to plantation cropping systems and crops like coconut, arecanut, oil palm, cashew, spices, cocoa, coffee, tea, and rubber. The Journal of Plantation Crops was established in 1973 and the editor-in-chief is V. Krishnakumar.
