= Meenuliyan Para =

Mountain peak in southern India

Meenuliyanpara
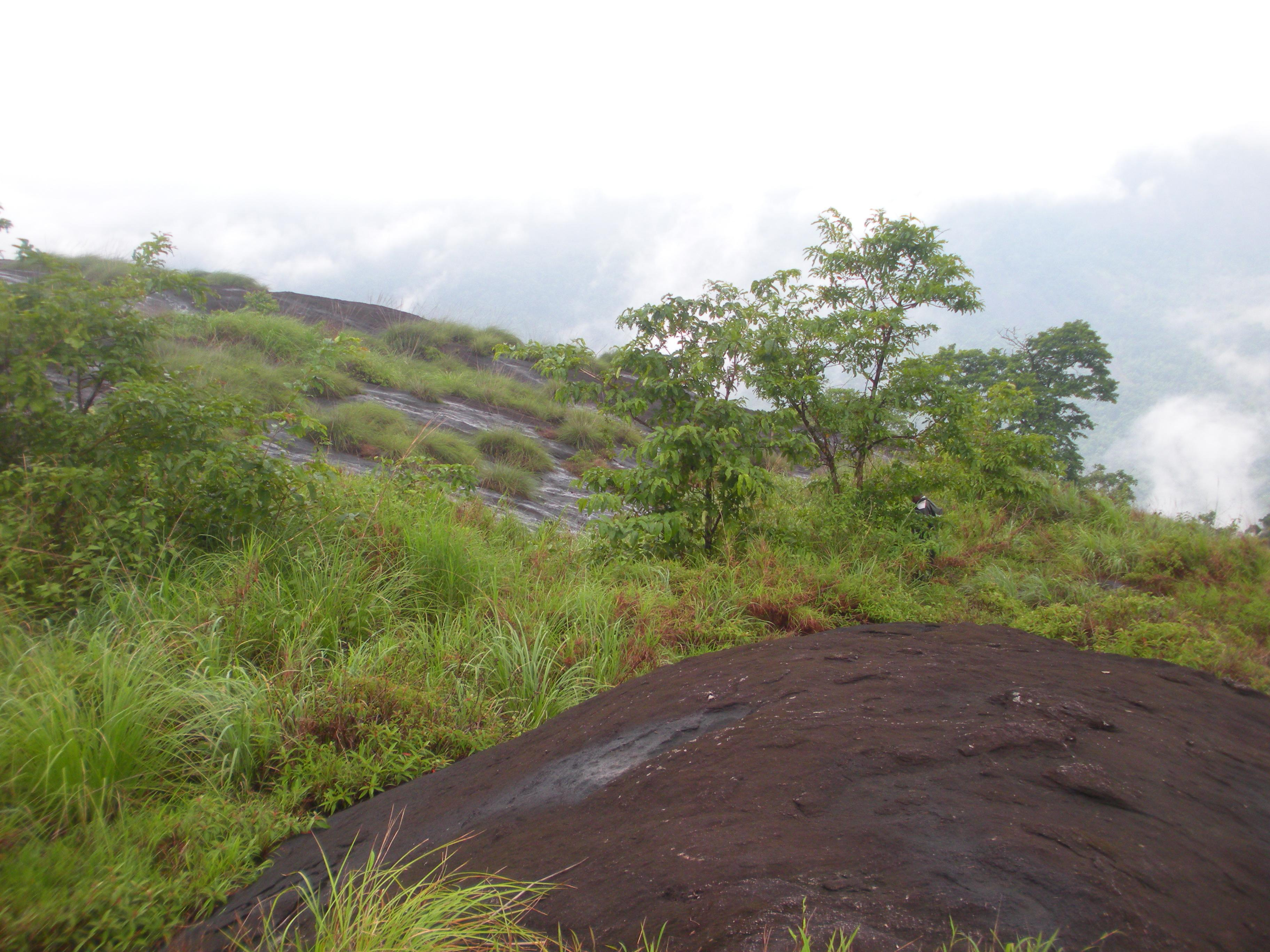
- View from top of Meenuliyanpara

Highest point
- Elevation: 1,220 m (4,000 ft)
- Coordinates: 10°00′08″N 76°51′34″E

Geography
- Location within Kerala
- Location: Thodupuzha taluk, Idukki, Kerala, India
- Parent range: Western Ghats

Climbing
- Easiest route: Hike

Meenuliyan Para is a prominent mountain peak located near Thodupuzha in the Idukki district of Kerala, India. Characterized by a massive rock formation that rises over 4000 feet, the mountain is named for the fish-scale appearance of its rocky surface. The peak hosts approximately two acres of evergreen forest at its summit.

Situated around 47 kilometers from Muvattupuzha and 51 kilometers from Thodupuzha, Meenuliyan Para is accessible only by a 3 kilometer pedestrian trail starting from Pattayakkudy in Vannappuram Panchayat. Clear weather offers expansive views of the surrounding landscape, including the Periyar region, Bhoothathankettu dam, and parts of Ernakulam and Thrissur districts.

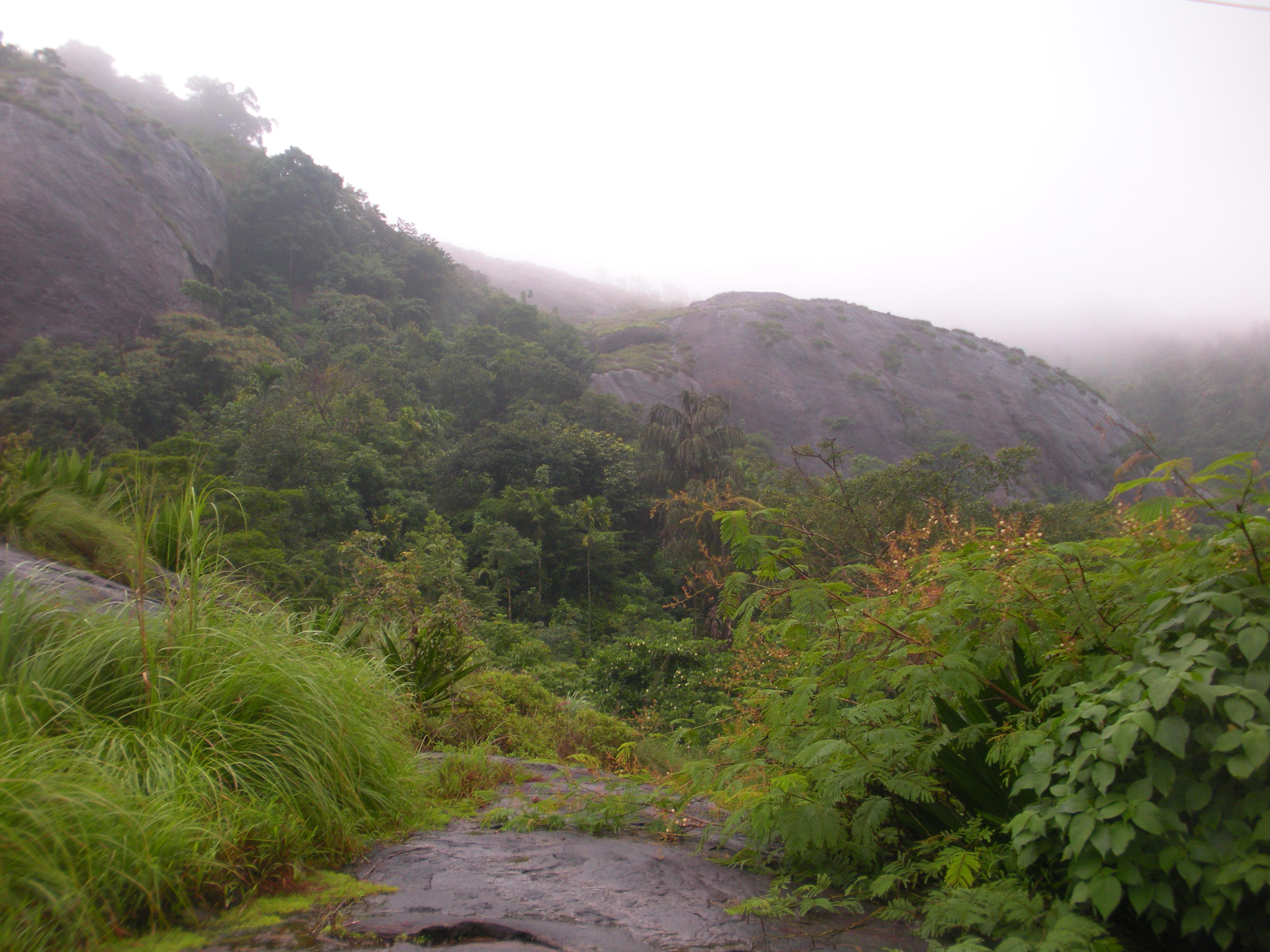
Vegetation on top of Meenuliyan Para
