= Poomala Dam =

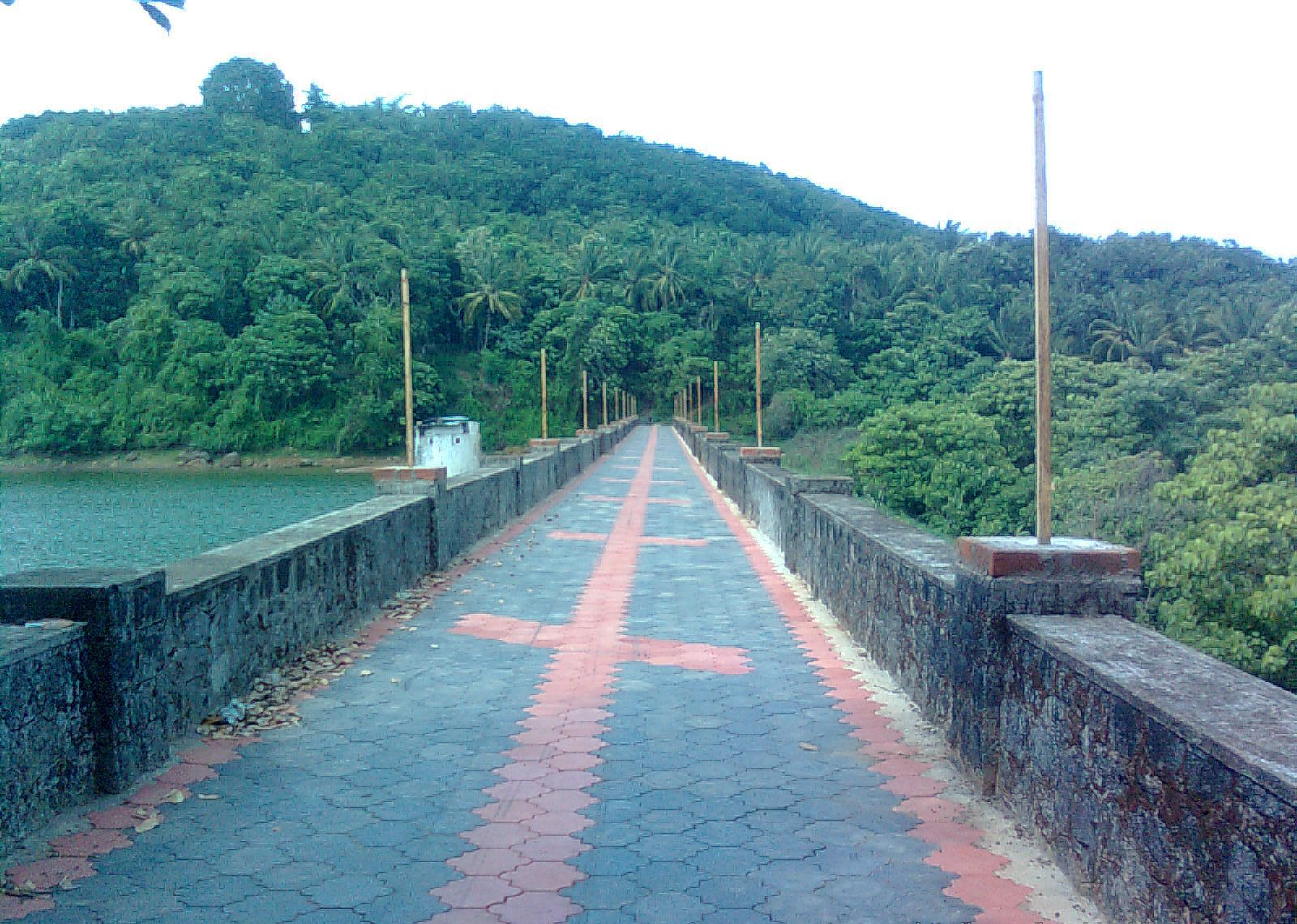
- A view of reservoir and dam

- Location within India Location within Kerala
- Official name: Poomala Dam
- Location: Poomala, Thrissur, Kerala, India
- Coordinates: 10.5998°N 76.2448°E
- Opening date: 1968
- Operators: Minor Irrigation Department, Kerala

Poomala Dam is an irrigation purpose dam and a tourist spot situated in Mulankunnathukavu Panchayath under Puzhakkal block in Thrissur, Kerala State of India.

== History and facilities ==
In 1939 a division weir was constructed in the Poomala Valley and in 1968 a Poomala reservoir was commissioned. The dam is managed by the Kerala Minor Irrigation Department and is constructed with mud and stone. Poomala Dam was officially designated as a tourist centre by the Home Minister of State, Kodiyeri Balakrishnan, on 21 March 2010. The dam is situated 94.50 meters above mean sea level. To its north lies another dam, Pathazhakundu, which presently is oriented only for irrigation. Other facilities in include boating in the reservoir, horse riding, a walkway of 600 metres; a community hall that can accommodate 300 persons; a cafeteria and latrine facilities.

== See also ==
- List of reservoirs and dams in India
