= Indian Cardamom Research Institute =

Research station

Coordinates: 9.8884°N 77.1559°E

- Interactive map of the Indian Cardamom Research Institute area

General information
- Location: India

Indian Cardamom Research Institute(ICRI) is the research wing under Spices Board dedicated to Cardamom. Started in 1978 to undertake basic and applied research on small Cardamom. It is situated in Myladumpara, Idukki.To address location specific requirements, two Regional Research Stations were also set up at Sakleshpur in Hassan District of Karnataka and Thadiankudisai in Dindigul District of Tamil Nadu during 1980.
