= Anginda peak =

Mountain in India

- അങ്ങിണ്ട മുടി
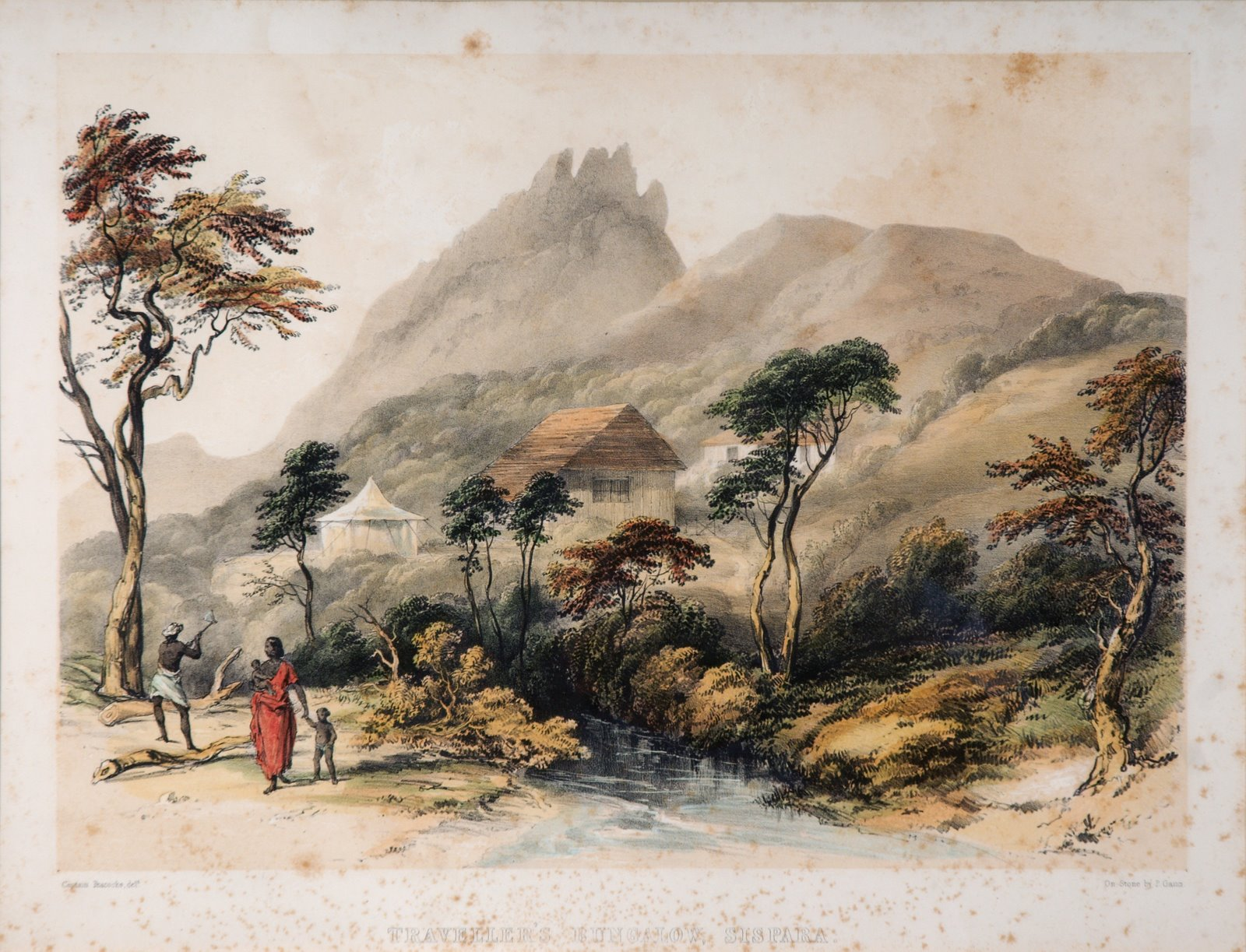
- Sispara pass. Anginda is background

Highest point
- Elevation: 2,383 m (7,818 ft)
- Listing: List of highest point in Kerala by districts
- Coordinates: 11°12′26″N 76°27′51″E

Geography
- Location within Kerala
- Location: Border of Mannarkad Taluk, Palakkad District and Kundah Taluk, Nilgiris district, Tamil Nadu, India
- Parent range: Western Ghats

Anginda peak (അങ്ങിണ്ട മുടി) is a mountain in the Nilgiri Hills of the Western Ghats on the border of the Nilgiris District of Tamil Nadu and Palakkad district of Kerala, India. It has an elevation of 2,383 metres (7,818 ft) and is the highest peak in Silent Valley National Park. It is just south of Sispara pass, and forms the southernmost boundary of Mukurthi National Park in Tamil Nadu. There is an unobstructed view of Anginda from the 30 m observation tower at Sairandhri Visitors Center. The Kunthipuzha River, which is a tributary of Bharathappuzha originates from the Anginda peak.

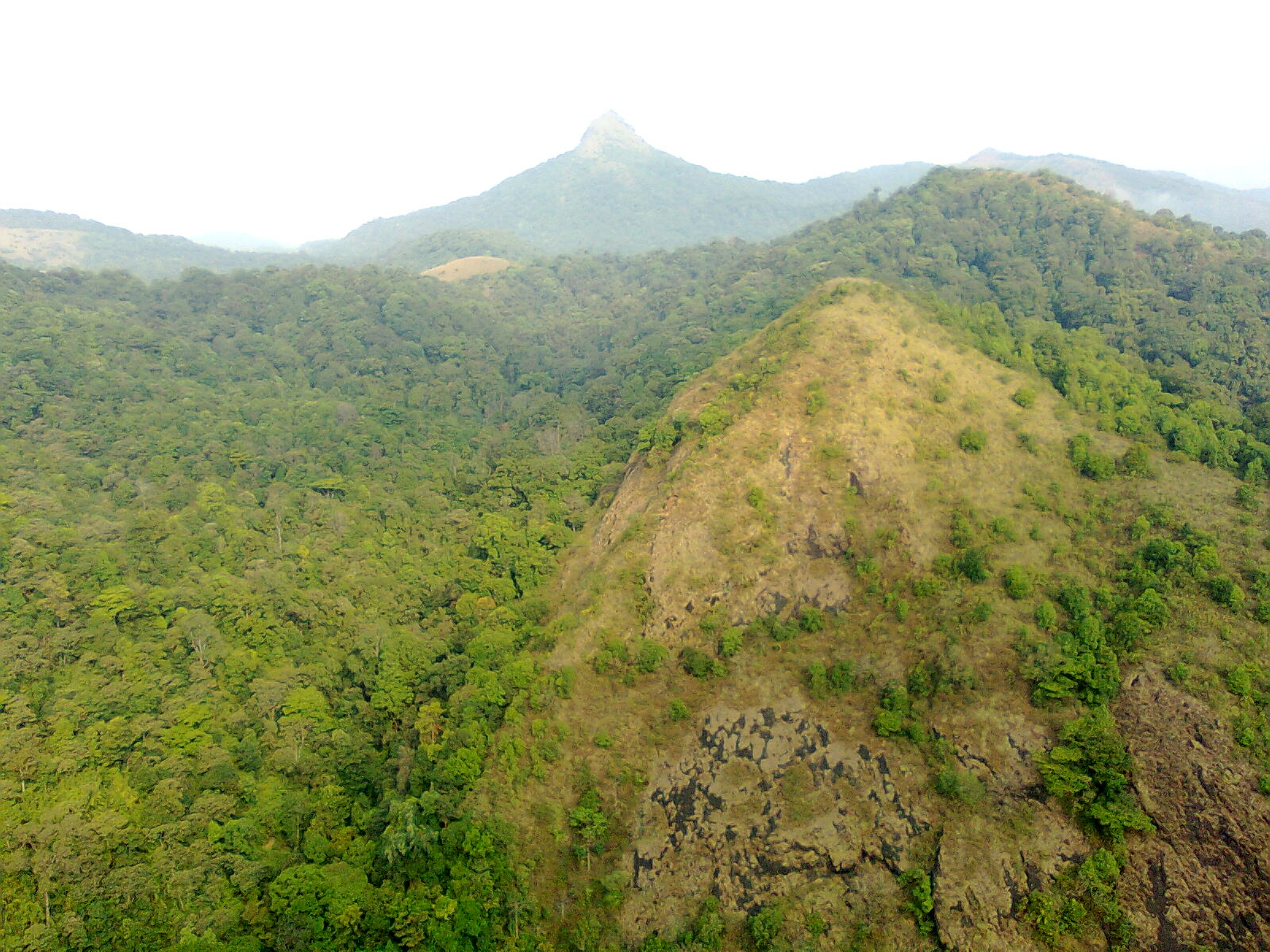
Anginda peak

There is a population of the endemic and endangered Nilgiri laughing-thrush at the Anginda-Sispara belt inside the Silent Valley National Park. Serious trekkers can take a 4-day trek route, starting from Mukkali through Sairandhri, Poochipara, Walakkad and Sispara to Anginda.
