= Karimala Gopuram =

Mountain peak in Kerala, India

Karimala Gopuram കരിമല ഗോപുരം
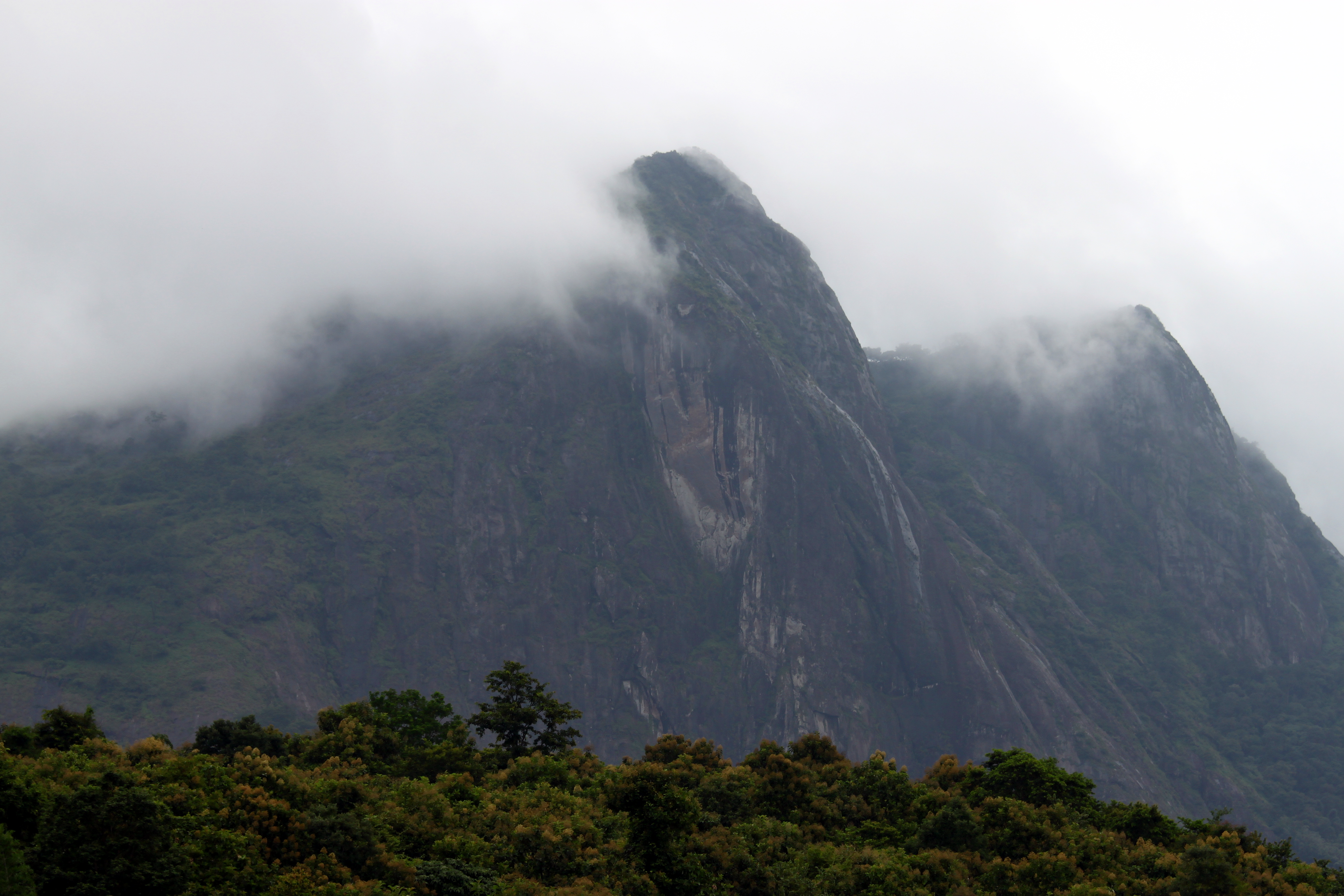
- View of Karimala Gopuram

Highest point
- Elevation: 1,439 m (4,721 ft)
- Listing: List of highest point in Kerala by districts
- Coordinates: 10°21′58.47″N 76°44′48.43″E

Geography
- Location within Kerala
- Location: Border of Chalakudy taluk, Thrissur district and Chittur taluk, Palakkad district, Kerala, India
- Parent range: Western Ghats

Karimala Gopuram (കരിമല ഗോപുരം) is the highest peak in the Thrissur district of Kerala. It is located at southern boundary of Parambikulam Wildlife Sanctuary. It lies in the border of Chalakudy taluk of Thrissur district and Chittur taluk of Palakkad district of Kerala. It is about 1,439m above sea level in the Western Ghats.
