= Kattumala =

Mountain in Kerala, India

Coordinates: 10°15′16.5702″N 77°05′52.2843″E

Kattumala (കാട്ടുമല) is one of the highest peaks in the Idukki district in Kerala, India. It is the second highest peak in the Eravikulam National Park after Anamudi. It is also located near to Munnar. It stands at an altitude of 2,552m above sea level and is the eighth highest peak in South India. The peak of Perumal Mala also lies very close to this peak.
