= Kumarikkal Mala =

Mountain peak in Western Ghats, India

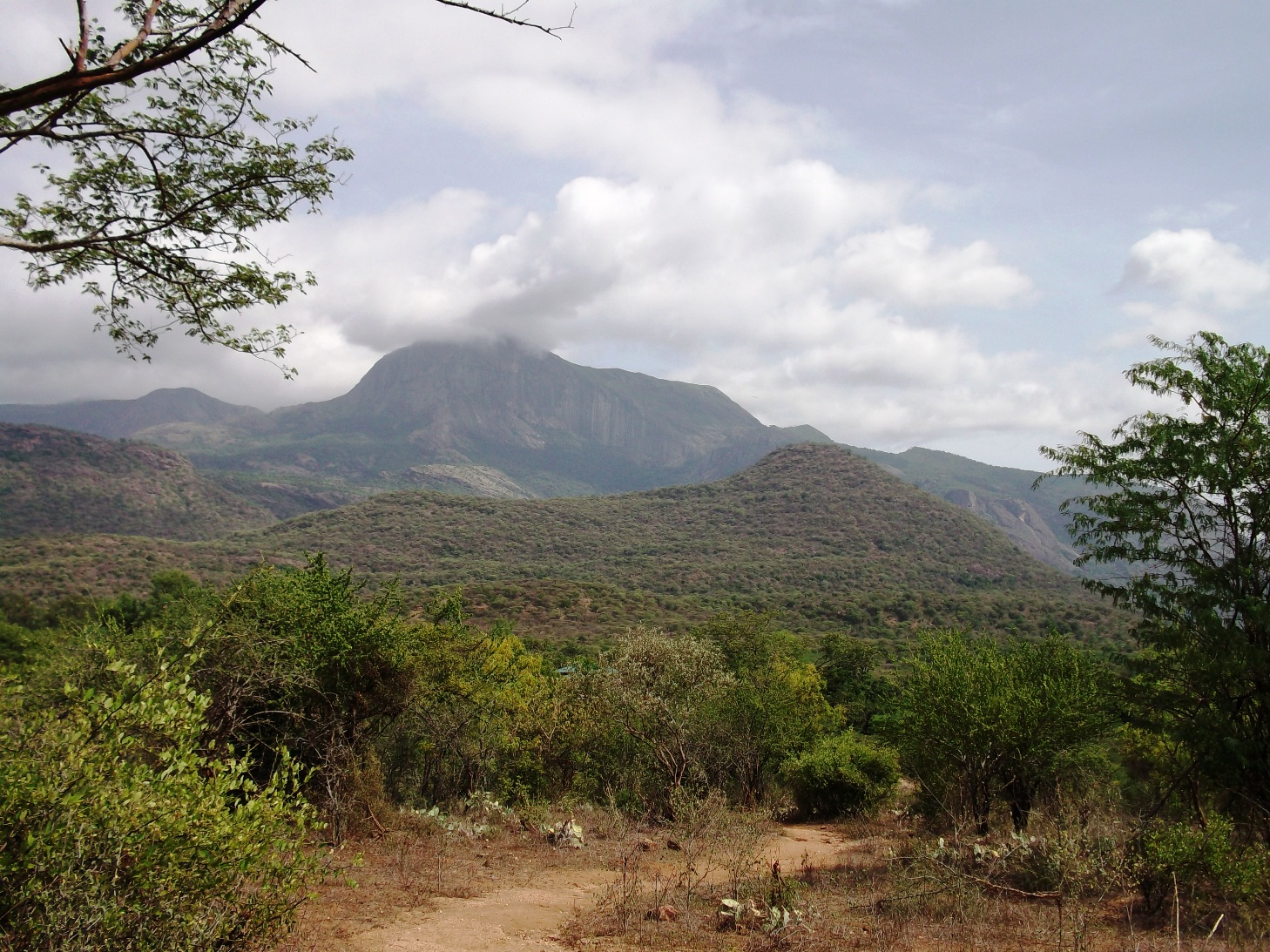
Kumarikkal Mala

Kumarikkal Mala (Malayalam :കുമരിക്കല്‍ മല) is a peak situated in the Chinnar Wildlife Sanctuary (Western Ghats) in Kerala at an altitude of 2,522 m (8,274 ft) above sea level. It is the highest peak in the Chinnar Wildlife Sanctuary and one of the highest peaks in Anamalai Hills exceeding 2,000 m (6,600 ft).

The Chinnar River originates near the peak. Other major peaks are Nandala malai, Vellaikal malai, Viriyottu malai and Kottakombu malai. The Nilgiri tahr is found on the slopes of the mountain.

Kumarikkal Mala is situated near to the Munnar Hill Station.
