= Kottamala =

Kottamalai
- கோட்டமலை കോട്ടമല
- Location within Kerala

Highest point
- Elevation: 2,019 m (6,624 ft)
- Coordinates: 9°31′16″N 77°24′07″E

Naming
- Language of name: Tamil, Malayalam

Geography
- Location: Periyar Tiger Reserve in Idukki District, Kerala.
- Parent range: Western Ghats

Climbing
- Easiest route: hike

Kottamalai (கோட்டமலை - കോട്ടമല) is the highest peak in Southern part of Western Ghats located in Periyar tiger reserve in Idukki district of Kerala is a tall mountain peak situated in the Western Ghats at an altitude of 2,019m. It is one of the few tall peaks in the Western Ghats; and the highest peak of all in the Periyar plateau exceeding 2,000m.]).

Kottamala is the southernmost peak higher than 2,000 metres (6,562 ft) in India. There is also a temple in the foothills
