= Devimala =

Mountain in Kerala, India

- Location within Kerala Location within India

Highest point
- Elevation: 2,206 m (7,238 ft)
- Coordinates: 10°03′34″N 77°09′03″E

Naming
- Language of name: Malayalam

Geography
- Location: Idukki district, Kerala, India
- Parent range: Anamala Hills, Western Ghats

Geology
- Orogeny: Pan-African (Mozambique)
- Rock age: Neoproterozoic (804-509 mya)
- Mountain type: Fault-block
- Rock type: Munnar Granite

Climbing
- Easiest route: hike

Devimala, is one of the high peaks of Western Ghats in the (Devikulam) taluk of Idukki district of Kerala. Devimala Peak lies in the Anamalai hills of Kerala. It is located at the Guderale tea estate between Guderale and Devikulam sections near to Old Devikulam town. It is the highest peak next to Devikulam hill station. It stands at an altitude of 2,206 m (7238 ft).
