= Anamudi =

Mountain

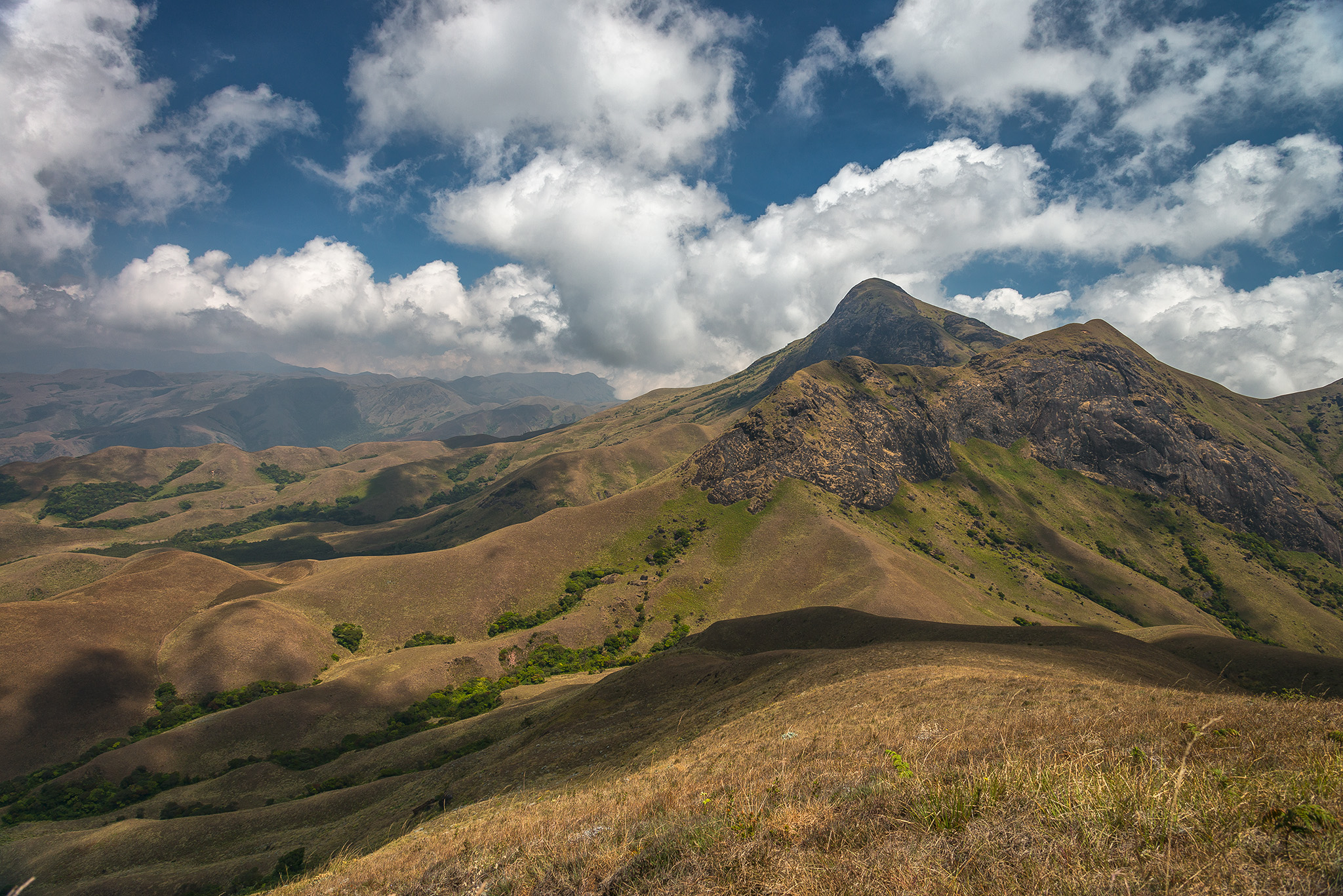
- A view of the Anamudi peak from the Naikolli Mala ridge

Highest point
- Elevation: 2,695 m (8,842 ft)
- Prominence: 2,479 m (8,133 ft)
- Isolation: 2,090 km (1,300 mi)
- Listing: Indian state high points Ultra
- Coordinates: 10°10′09″N 77°03′38″E

Naming
- English translation: Elephant head
- Language of name: Malayalam

Geography
- Location within Kerala Location within India
- Location: Ernakulam district and Idukki district, Kerala, India
- Parent range: Anamala Hills, Western Ghats

Geology
- Orogeny: Pan-African (Mozambique)
- Rock age: Neoproterozoic (804-509 mya)
- Mountain type: Fault-block
- Rock type: Munnar Granite

Climbing
- Easiest route: hike

Anamudi ("Elephant head", Malayalam: [aːnɐmuɖi]) is a mountain located in Ernakulam district and Idukki district of the Indian state of Kerala. With an elevation of 2,695 m (8,842 ft), it is the highest peak in the Western Ghats and in South India.

== Geography ==
Anamudi has an elevation of 2,695 metres (8,842 ft). It is the highest peak and one of the three ultra prominent peaks in South India. It is the peak with the greatest topographic isolation within India and is the highest point south of the Himalayas. It is called the Everest of South India. Anamudi has a topographic prominence of 2,479 metres (8,133 ft), the associated key saddle being over 2,000 kilometres (1,200 mi) away at 28°35′20″N 76°27′59″E in Haryana state just to the west of Delhi. The peak is not exceptionally steep and is a fault-block mountain. The north and south slopes are gentle, while the east and west slopes are steeper, with difficult rock faces. It is located in the southern region of Eravikulam National Park at the junction of the Cardamom Hills, the Anaimalai Hills and the Palani Hills in the Periyar River basin of Kerala at a distance of 13 km (8 mi) from Munnar.

== Geology ==
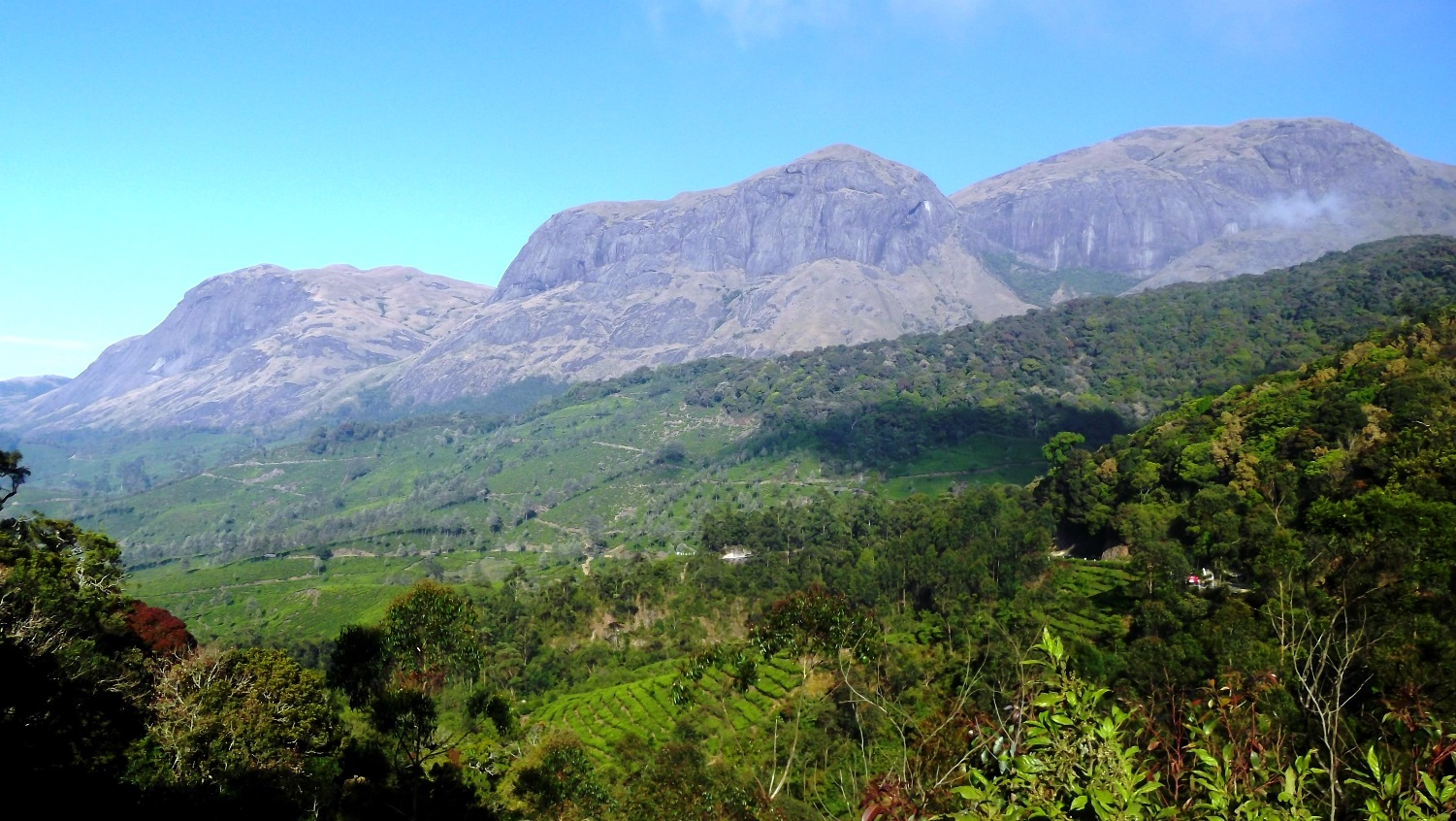
Anamudi as seen from the southeast

Anamudi is located within a larger tectonic province, a Neoproterozoic mobile belt known as the Southern Granulite Terrane (SGT) or Pandyan Mobile Belt. This geologic province represents an area of Archean rocks that were deeply buried during the neoproterozoic Pan-African Orogeny, as part of the Mozambique Belt, in which developed Himalayan-scale mountains when West and East Gondwana collided due to the closure of the ancient Mozambique Ocean. Specifically, Anamudi is located within a geological sub-province of the SGT known as the Madurai Province. The mountain massif itself is composed of neoproterozoic A-type granite known as Munnar Granite, which was intruded deep into the thickened crust of the SGT during Orogenic collapse of the Pan-African highlands. After approximately 800-500 million years of burial, the Munnar Granite of the Anamundi massif is now exposed high above sea level due to a combination of faulting and unroofing.

== Climate ==
Köppen-Geiger climate classification system classifies it as subtropical highland (Cwb), bordering on Cwc. Sholas are found in its valleys, like most meadows of the Western Ghats.

Climate data for Munnar (Note: Munnar is located 15 km (9.3 mi) from Anamudi at an altitude of 1,461 m (4,793 ft))
Month	Jan	Feb	Mar	Apr	May	Jun	Jul	Aug	Sep	Oct	Nov	Dec	Year
Mean daily maximum °C (°F)	22.4 (72.3)	23.7 (74.7)	25.3 (77.5)	25.6 (78.1)	25.6 (78.1)	23.7 (74.7)	22.4 (72.3)	22.8 (73.0)	23.2 (73.8)	22.7 (72.9)	21.8 (71.2)	21.9 (71.4)	23.4 (74.2)
Daily mean °C (°F)	17.6 (63.7)	18.7 (65.7)	20.2 (68.4)	21 (70)	21.4 (70.5)	20.3 (68.5)	19.3 (66.7)	19.5 (67.1)	19.6 (67.3)	19.2 (66.6)	18.3 (64.9)	17.7 (63.9)	19.4 (66.9)
Mean daily minimum °C (°F)	12.9 (55.2)	13.7 (56.7)	15.1 (59.2)	16.5 (61.7)	17.3 (63.1)	16.9 (62.4)	16.3 (61.3)	16.3 (61.3)	16 (61)	15.7 (60.3)	14.8 (58.6)	13.5 (56.3)	15.4 (59.8)
Average precipitation mm (inches)	18 (0.7)	29 (1.1)	47 (1.9)	129 (5.1)	189 (7.4)	420 (16.5)	583 (23.0)	364 (14.3)	210 (8.3)	253 (10.0)	164 (6.5)	64 (2.5)	2,470 (97.3)
Average rainy days	2	2	3	6	8	9	10	9	10	12	8	5	84
Mean monthly sunshine hours	248	232	248	240	217	120	124	124	150	155	180	217	2,255
Source: Climate-Data.org and Weather2Travel

== Flora and Fauna ==
Anamudi and the Eravikulam National Park surrounding it is home to the largest surviving population of the Nilgiri tahr. Asian elephants, gaur, Bengal tigers, and the Nilgiri marten are some of the species of animals found here. The area is also habitat of several amphibians including Raorchestes resplendens, unique to the region. The summit of the Anamudi is vegetated with patches of stunted Kuruna densifolia and Gaultheria fragrantissima (wintergreen), Anaphalis, Impatiens and Eriocaulon.

== See also ==
- Eravikulam National Park
- Munnar
- Pallivasal
- Pooyamkutty
- List of ultras of Tibet, East Asia and neighbouring areas
