= Karian Shola National Park =

Protected area in Tamil Nadu, India

- Location within India
- Location: Tamil Nadu, India
- Coordinates: 10°23′N 77°5′E

Karian Shola National Park

Karian Shola National Park is a protected area in the Western Ghats, India, nominated as a national park in 1989. The Western Ghats are a chain of mountains running down the west of India parallel with the coast some 30 to 50 km (19 to 31 mi) inland. They are not true mountains, but the edge of a fault that resulted about 150 million years ago as the subcontinent of India split from Gondwanaland. They are older than the Himalayan mountain range and are clothed in ancient forests. They influence the weather in India as they intercept the incoming monsoon storm systems. The greatest rainfall occurs between June and September during the southwest monsoon, with lesser amounts falling in the northeast monsoon between October and November. The Western Ghats are a UNESCO World Heritage Site and are considered to be one of the eight most important "hotspots" of biological diversity in the world.

The Karian Shola National Park is located at the southern end of the Western Ghats, in the Anaimalai Hills. The geographical coordinates of the park are latitude 10°13.2' to 10°33.3´N, and longitude 76°49.3' to 77°21.4' E. The National Park area spans 5.03 km² and is entirely located within the Anamalai Tiger Reserve in Tamil Nadu state. The forest tract of Karian Shola extends into Parambikulam Tiger Reserve in Kerala state over an additional extent of 3.77 km².

== UNESCO World Heritage Site ==
The Western Ghats became a World Heritage Site in 2012. In the Anamalai sub-cluster in Tamil Nadu, beside Karian Shola, two other national parks are included, Grass Hills National Park and Mukurthi National Park. Additionally, three other protected areas are included, Kalakkad Mundanthurai Tiger Reserve, Grizzled Squirrel Wildlife Sanctuary and Tirunelveli (North) Forest Division. All these areas were previously protected under India's Wildlife Protection Act and the Forest (Conservation) Act, 1980, and people living in the Western Ghats were told that they should not expect any change as a result of being UNESCO listed; activities that were lawful before the area became a World Heritage Site would still be lawful afterwards. The World Heritage Committee said that the "site’s high montane forest ecosystems influence the Indian monsoon weather pattern. Moderating the tropical climate of the region, it presents one of the best examples of the monsoon system in the planet." It added that the Western Ghats were "also home to at least 325 globally threatened flora, fauna, bird, amphibian, reptile, and fish species".

== Flora and fauna ==
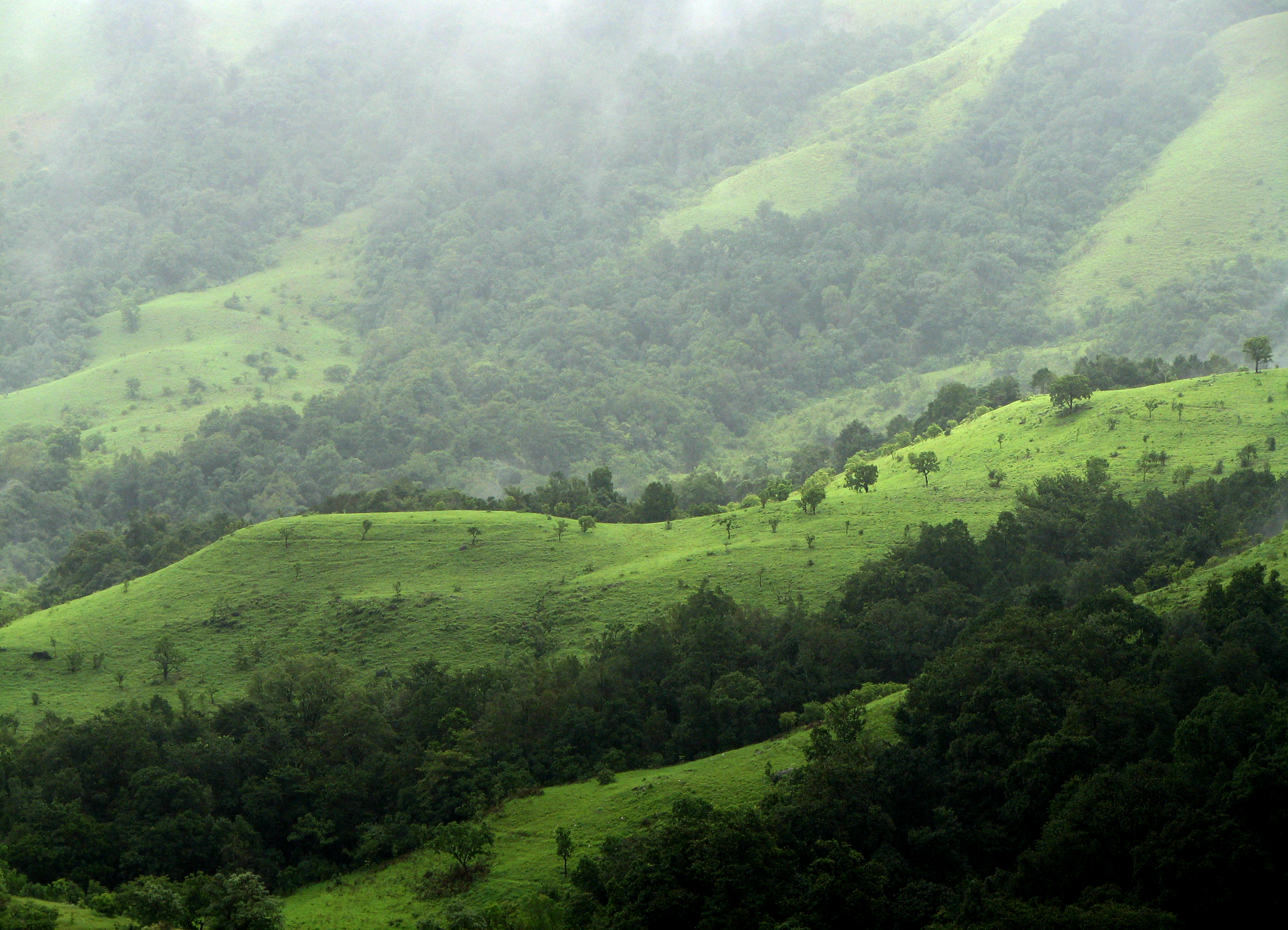
Shola forest and montane grassland

The Karian Shola National Park consists of areas of luxurious but stunted, mossy rainforests known as shola forests interspersed with rolling montane grassland with towering rocky cliffs, making it a biologically unique ecosystem. It is the largest such block of land in the Western Ghats and is largely undisturbed. The forest is often wreathed in mist and is important for the protection of the habitat and prevention of erosion. It contains many endangered and threatened species of plants and animals, many of which are endemic to the area. The grassland covers the greater part of the park with patches of the shola forest interspersed in the valleys and folds of the ground. The forest is affected by winds and few of the trees exceed 15 m (50 ft). The trees are twisted and gnarled with contorted boughs laden with mosses, lichens, orchids and other epiphytic plants. The interior of the forest is dark and there is an understorey consisting of such shrubs as Lasianthus, Psychotria and a range of different Strobilanthes species.

The grassland consists of grasses and flowering plant species resistant to frost and fire. The shrub known as neelakurinji (Strobilanthes kunthiana) grows in the grassland and flowers once every twelve years and afterwards dies. It is a spectacular sight when in flower and mass flowerings took place in 1994 and 2006 in the Anaimalai and Palni Hills. The flora of Karian Shola National Park includes a number of plants valued for their use in traditional medicine.

The Anamalai hills are an important area for the conservation of the endemic Nilgiri tahr (Nilgiritragus hylocrius), and is home to about 560 to 680 species of animal. This is an important area for the Asian elephant, and among the numerous mammals are various deer, wild boar, tiger, leopard and smaller carnivores. There are several primates, sloth bears, mongooses, otters, squirrels, rats, hares, shrews, porcupines and pangolins. Besides these there are numerous species of bird, reptile and amphibian as well as butterflies, moths, beetles, mantises, ants, termites and spiders.
