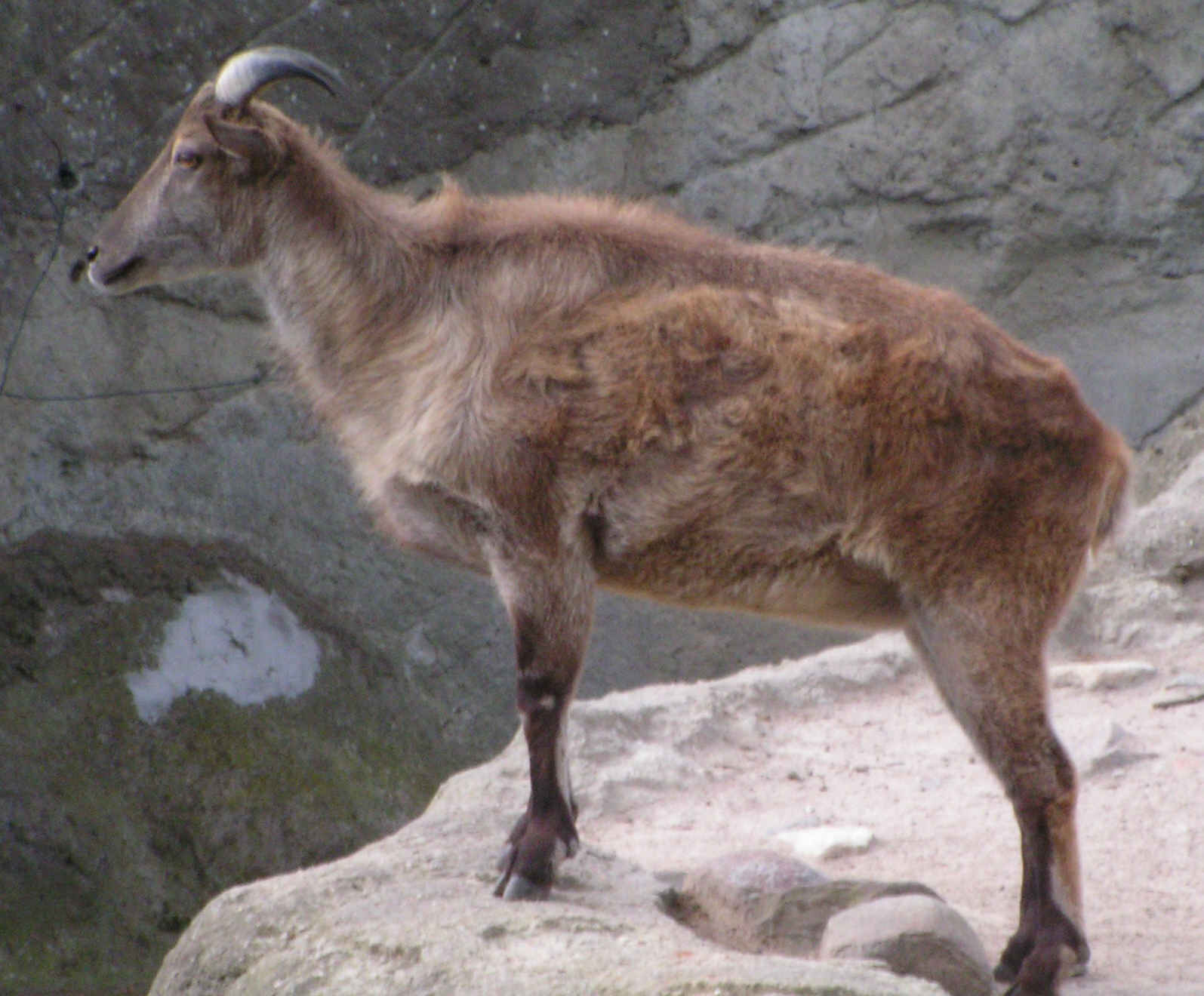
- Himalayan tahr

Scientific classification
- Kingdom: Animalia
- Phylum: Chordata
- Class: Mammalia
- Order: Artiodactyla
- Family: Bovidae
- Subfamily: Caprinae
- Tribe: Caprini

Species
- Arabitragus jayakari; Hemitragus jemlahicus; Nilgiritragus hylocrius

= Tahr =

Species of mammal

Tahrs (Note: Sometimes referred to as thars by confusion with the Himalayan serow (Capricornis sumatraensis thar).) (/tɑːrz/ TARZ, /tɛərz/ TAIRZ) or tehrs (/tɛərz/ TAIRZ) are large artiodactyl ungulates related to goats and sheep. There are three species, all native to Asia. Previously thought to be closely related to each other and placed in a single genus, Hemitragus, genetic studies have since proven that they are not so closely related and they are now considered as members of three separate monotypic genera: Hemitragus is now reserved for the Himalayan tahr, Nilgiritragus for the Nilgiri tahr, and Arabitragus for the Arabian tahr.

== Ranges ==
While the Arabian tahr of Oman and the Nilgiri tahr of South India both have small ranges and are considered endangered, the Himalayan tahr remains relatively widespread in the Himalayas, and has been introduced to the Southern Alps of New Zealand, where it is hunted recreationally. Also, a population exists on Table Mountain in South Africa, descended from a pair of tahrs that escaped from a zoo in 1936, but most of these have been culled. As for the Nilgiri tahr, research indicates its presence to be in the mountain ranges of southern India. Totalling ~1400 individuals in 1998, its largest remaining population appears to survive between the Indian states of Tamil Nadu and Kerala, where it may be vulnerable to poachers and illegal hunting.

== Behavior ==
A routine of feeding during the morning followed by a long rest period, then feeding in the evening, constitutes the tahr's daily routine. Tahrs are not generally active or feed at night and can be found at the same location morning and evening.

== Tamilnadu ==
Nilgiri Tahr is the state animal of Tamil Nadu. It has references from Tamil Sangam Literature like Cilappatikaram and Cīvaka Cintāmaṇi. In 2023, Tamil nadu government has declared October 7 as Nilgiri Tahr Day in honour of E. R. C. Davidar
