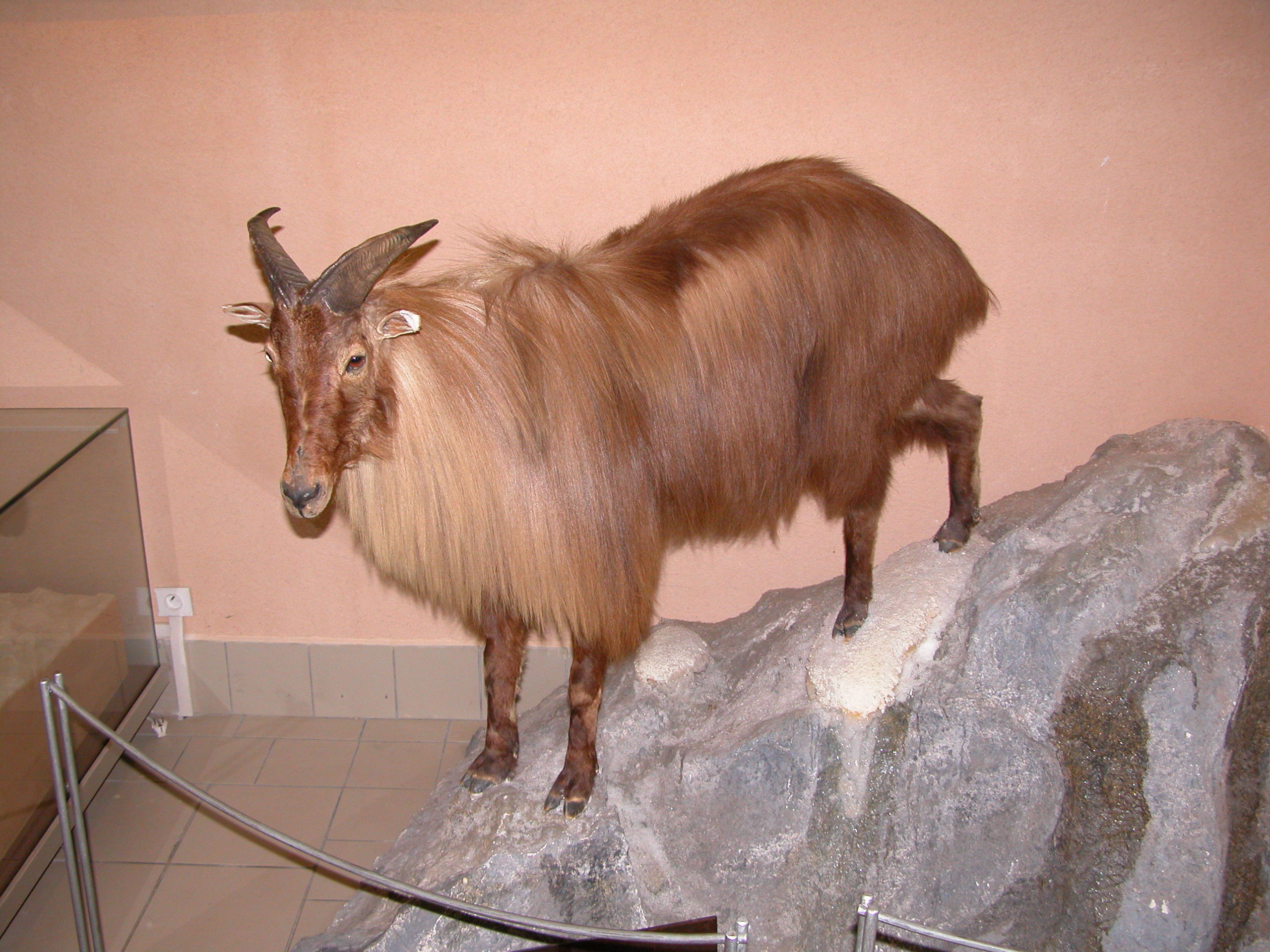
- Reconstruction at Museum of Prehistory Tautavel

Scientific classification
- Kingdom: Animalia
- Phylum: Chordata
- Class: Mammalia
- Order: Artiodactyla
- Family: Bovidae
- Subfamily: Caprinae
- Genus: Hemitragus
- Species: †H. bonali

Binomial name
- †Hemitragus bonali Harlé & Stehlin, 1913

= Hemitragus bonali =

Hemitragus bonali Temporal range: Mid - Late Pleistocene

Extinct species of bovid

Hemitragus bonali, the Bonal tahr, is an extinct species of bovid from the Pleistocene of Europe and the Caucasus Mountains region.

The most recent remains of the Bonal tahr were found in layers dating from 298,000 ± 55,000 ka. The Bonal tahr was closely related (and possibly ancestral to) another extinct European tahr species, Hemitragus cedrensis.

== Palaeobiology ==
=== Palaeoecology ===
Food web reconstruction derived from paired δ^{13}C and δ^{18}O measurements of the fauna of the fossil site of Payre in France indicates that the Bonal tahr was preyed on heavily by wolves in areas where wolves and Neanderthals coexisted and partitioned resources.
