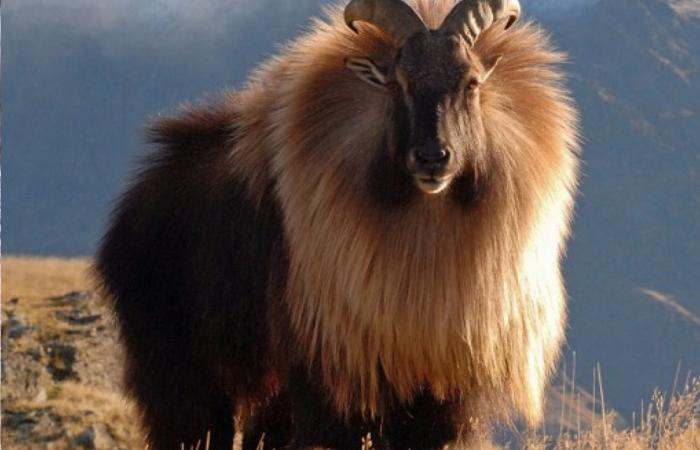
- Himalayan tahr (Hemitragus jemlahicus)

Scientific classification
- Kingdom: Animalia
- Phylum: Chordata
- Class: Mammalia
- Infraclass: Placentalia
- Order: Artiodactyla
- Family: Bovidae
- Subfamily: Caprinae
- Tribe: Caprini
- Genus: Hemitragus (Hodgson, 1841)

Species
- Hemitragus jemlahicus †Hemitragus bonali †Hemitragus cedrensis

= Hemitragus =

Hemitragus Temporal range: Pleistocene - Recent

Genus of mammals

Hemitragus is a genus of bovids that currently contains a single living species, the Himalayan tahr. Two extinct species are also known from the Pleistocene, Hemitragus bonali and Hemitragus cedrensis.

The Arabian tahr and Nilgiri tahr were once included in Hemitragus but have since been assigned to their own genera, Arabitragus and Nilgiritragus.
