= Hemitragus cedrensis =

Hemitragus cedrensis Temporal range: Mid - Late Pleistocene

Scientific classification
- Domain: Eukaryota
- Kingdom: Animalia
- Phylum: Chordata
- Class: Mammalia
- Order: Artiodactyla
- Family: Bovidae
- Subfamily: Caprinae
- Tribe: Caprini
- Genus: Hemitragus
- Species: †H. cedrensis

Binomial name
- †Hemitragus cedrensis Crégut-Bonnoure, 1989

Extinct species of bovid

Hemitragus cedrensis is an extinct species of bovid known from the Eemian of France and the Iberian Peninsula.

The other species of Hemitragus are the extinct Hemitragus bonali, also from Europe, and the living Himalayan tahr. H. cedrensis shows intermediate features between that of its two close relatives, and likely evolved from H. bonali.
