= Davidar =

Davidar is a surname. Notable people with the surname include:

- David Davidar (born 1958), Indian novelist and publisher
- Priya Davidar, Indian scientific researcher, conservation biologist, scholar, and author
