= Priya Davidar =

Indian researcher, scholar, author

- Occupations: Researcher, scientist, writer

Priya Davidar is an Indian scientific researcher, conservation biologist, scholar, and author. She retired as a Professor at Pondicherry University and has conducted ecological research in different regions of India. She has authored a few books, including Whispers from the Wild, co-authored with E. R. C. Davidar and published by Penguin India books. She was elected Fellow of the American Association for the Advancement of Science in 2012. She is actively involved with the conservation of forests and wildlife. She has published about 100 papers in scientific journals.

== Early life and family ==
Davidar grew up in Ooty, Tamil Nadu, which is known for its rich variety of fauna and flora. She witnessed the loss of wildlife and nature as she grew up, which motivated her to get into the field of conservation. She said, In a competition for space, other species are rapidly losing out to humans."

Davidar's father is a conservationist E.R.C. Davidar and brother Mark Davidar is one of the founders of the Sigur Nature Trust (SNT), in Masinagudi, Tamil Nadu, India which is a 30-acre [CONVERT] wildlife reserve.

She married Jean-Philippe Puyravaud who is a research scientist trained in remote sensing. They have collaborated on many research papers.

== Education ==
She completed her BSc in 1973 from Madras University and then moved on to get an MSc in 1975 from the same university. In 1979, she was awarded a PhD from Bombay University and later moved on to acquire a S.M. from Harvard University in 1985.

For her doctoral thesis, she worked on pollination of the hemi-parasitic mistletoes by nectar feeding birds, under the guidance of the naturalist, Salim Ali, who is known as the "bird man of India".

== Work ==
As a conservation biologist, her work mostly revolved around forest ecology, pollination biology and endangered species conservation.

She worked for close to three decades in Pondicherry University at the Department of Ecology and Environmental Sciences until she retired. Currently, she is working on a research project where she is "analysing tree distributions at the bio-geographical scale, and the conservation genetics of endangered species such as the Asian elephant and Nilgiri Tahr"

She is one of the few women who were field biologists in the 1970s. Though scientists who have only carried out research inside of their laboratories do not adjust well to fieldwork, Allison Snow, who was a fellow postdoc in Panama remarked, "Priya was … unfazed by all the practical difficulties."

== Challenges ==
Dr. Davidar has been vocal about the inherent gender bias found in the field of ecology. When asked about how she was treated by her male colleagues, she said, ""They suggested that I get married and stay in the kitchen. I used to take it quite personally and suffered a lot. Now, I realize this only creates needless stress for oneself." She also acknowledges that caste can be another barrier in the field which is mostly dominated by people who belong to the upper caste. She said that though there are no proper statistics, "caste-based nepotism is very much a part of academic recruitment procedure". She also added, "My advice to researchers from disadvantaged backgrounds unwelcome in upper-caste networks is to find collaborators who are supportive to buffer the harshness. Being persistent and carrying on despite difficulties is important. What I found is, time is an important ally that leads to eventual success."

According to her, field work can sometimes be challenging to women researchers due to "large gangs of mostly young men from cities, prowling around in the jungles drinking and looking for trouble. Anonymity probably gives them cover for harassment of women." In such cases, however, it is the locals who help them as they tend to feel protective of the women researchers.

== Honours and awards ==
In 2009, she was the President of the Association for Tropical Biology and Conservation.

In 2012, she was elected Fellow of the American Association for the Advancement of Science (AAAS).

== Bibliography ==
- Whispers from the Wild
- Giant Hearts: Travels in the world of Elephants
