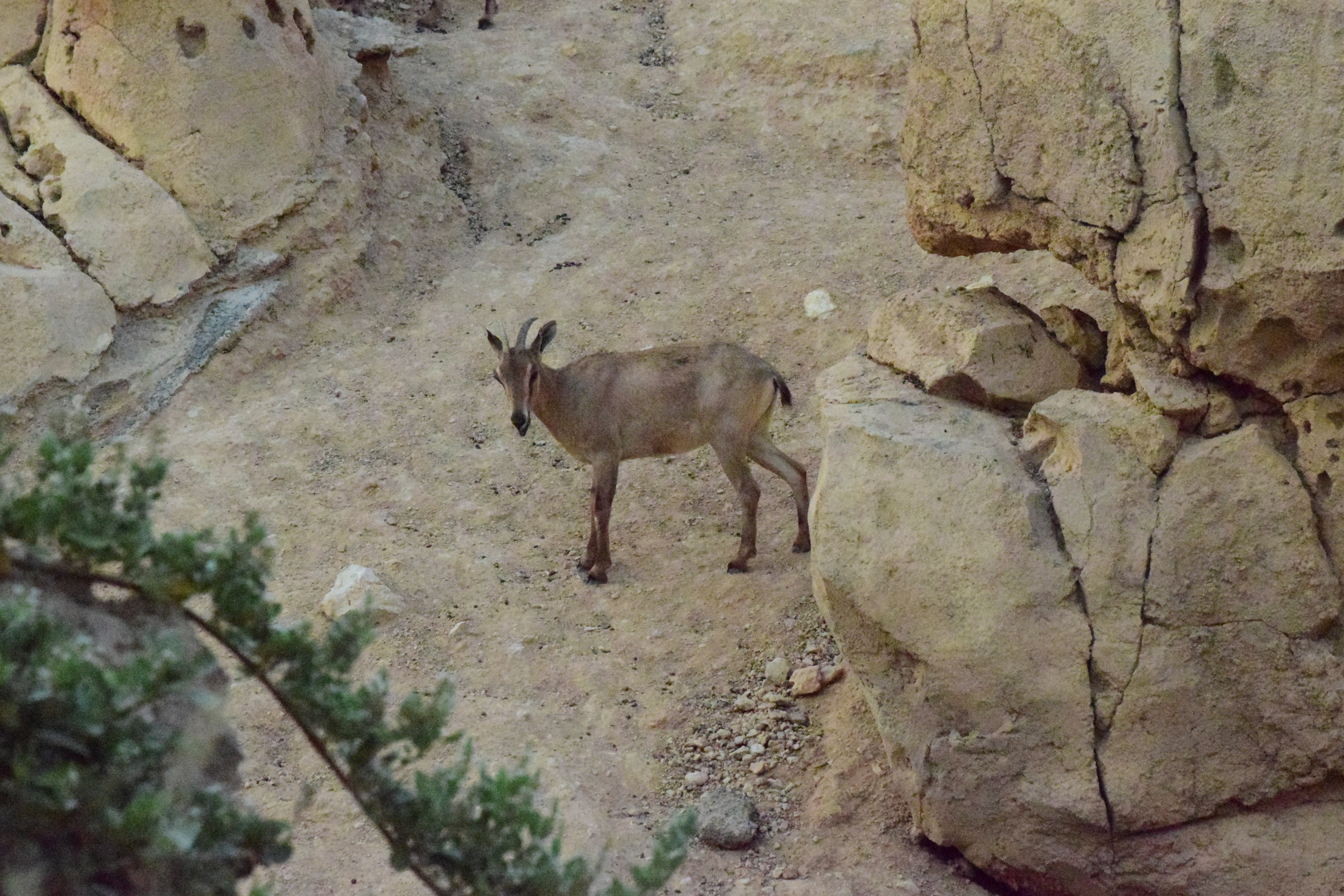
- Tahr at Al Ain Zoo near Jebel Hafeet in the UAE

Conservation status
- Endangered (IUCN 3.1)

Scientific classification
- Kingdom: Animalia
- Phylum: Chordata
- Class: Mammalia
- Order: Artiodactyla
- Family: Bovidae
- Subfamily: Caprinae
- Tribe: Caprini
- Genus: Arabitragus; Ropiquet & Hassanin, 2005
- Species: A. jayakari

Binomial name
- Arabitragus jayakari (Thomas, 1894)
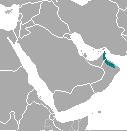
- Distribution of the tahr in the region of the Hajar Mountains of Oman and the UAE in Eastern Arabia

Synonyms
- Hemitragus jayakari

= Arabian tahr =

Species of mammal

The Arabian tahr (Arabitragus jayakari) is a species of tahr native to eastern Arabia. Until recently, it was placed in the genus Hemitragus, but genetic evidence supports its removal to a separate monotypic genus, Arabitragus.

== Description ==
It is the smallest species of tahr. It is of stocky build with backward-arching horns in both sexes. Males are much more robust than females. Their coats consist of a long, reddish-brown hair, with a dark stripe running down the back. Males possess the most impressive manes which extend right down the back and grow longer, based on the age. In the oldest males the muzzle darkens to black and the eye stripes also darken. As with most goat-antelopes, they have rubber-like hooves to provide balance and traction on the steep, rocky slopes.

As of 2018, the wild population is estimated to be approximately 2,450 individuals (~2,200 – 2,325 mature individuals).

== Habitat and range ==
The Arabian tahr lives on steep rocky slopes of the Hajar Mountains in Oman and the United Arab Emirates, at altitudes up to 1,800 m (5,900 ft) above sea level. It is also found in the area of Jebel Hafeet.

== Taxonomy ==
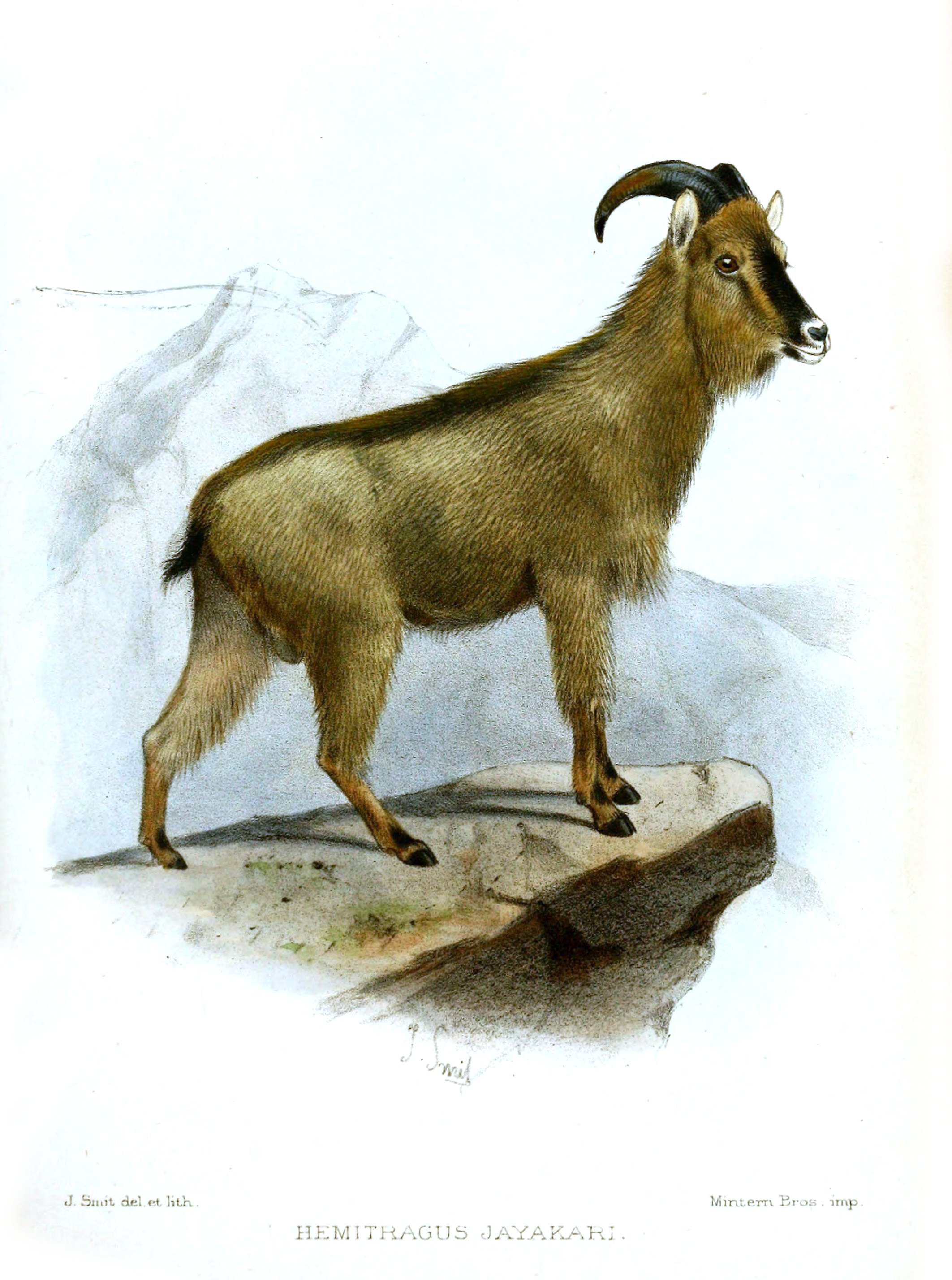
Illustration by Joseph Smit in the collection of the Zoological Society of London

The Arabian tahr was first described in 1894 by Oldfield Thomas who proposed the name Hemitragus jayakari for zoological specimens collected in Oman Jebel Taw. It was separated into the newly created genus Arabitragus in 2005 on the basis of a study on the molecular phylogeny of the group.

== Etymology ==
The genus name Arabitragus is derived from the Greek words aravikós meaning "Arabian" and trágos meaning "goat".

== Behaviour and ecology ==
Unlike other species of tahr, the Arabian tahr is solitary or lives in small groups consisting of a female and a kid, or a male. Instead of forming herds during seasonal ruts, reproduction occurs in small, dispersed family units. Births have been reported as occurring throughout the year, and gestation lasts from 140–145 days.

=== Diet and predation ===
These animals are usually browsers, feeding on grasses, shrubs, leaves, and fruits of most trees. They are highly dependent on water and need to drink every two to three days during summer. They descend from their point of elevation to drink from river courses known as wadis, and travel to new areas when water dries up.

The tahr was likely preyed upon by the Arabian leopard (Panthera pardus nimr) before the leopard's possible extirpation from the region in recent times.

== Threats ==
The Arabian tahr is endangered due to intense overgrazing, poaching, and habitat destruction. In Oman, a recent increase of human migration to urban areas has resulted in domestic goats becoming feral and foraging in places that were once strictly the tahr's home. Habitat degradation is also another major threat, due to construction of roads, buildings, and mineral extraction. Also, poaching often occurs when the animals descend down from the mountains for water.

== Conservation ==
In 1973, efforts were planned to protect the Arabian tahr, and in 1975, a protection program was introduced in the Hajar Mountains. In 1980, a captive-breeding program was set up at the Omani Mammal Breeding Center to reintroduce captive-bred individuals back into the wild. Three institutions are now involved, one in Oman and two in the United Arab Emirates. In April 2009, the Wadi Wurayah preserve in the Emirate of Fujairah was set aside by royal decree in the Emirates for the protection of the tahr. Another place in the UAE, Sir Bani Yas in the Emirate of Abu Dhabi, was also set up for its conservation.

== See also ==
- Himalayan tahr
- Nilgiri tahr
- Wildlife of Oman
- Wildlife of the United Arab Emirates
