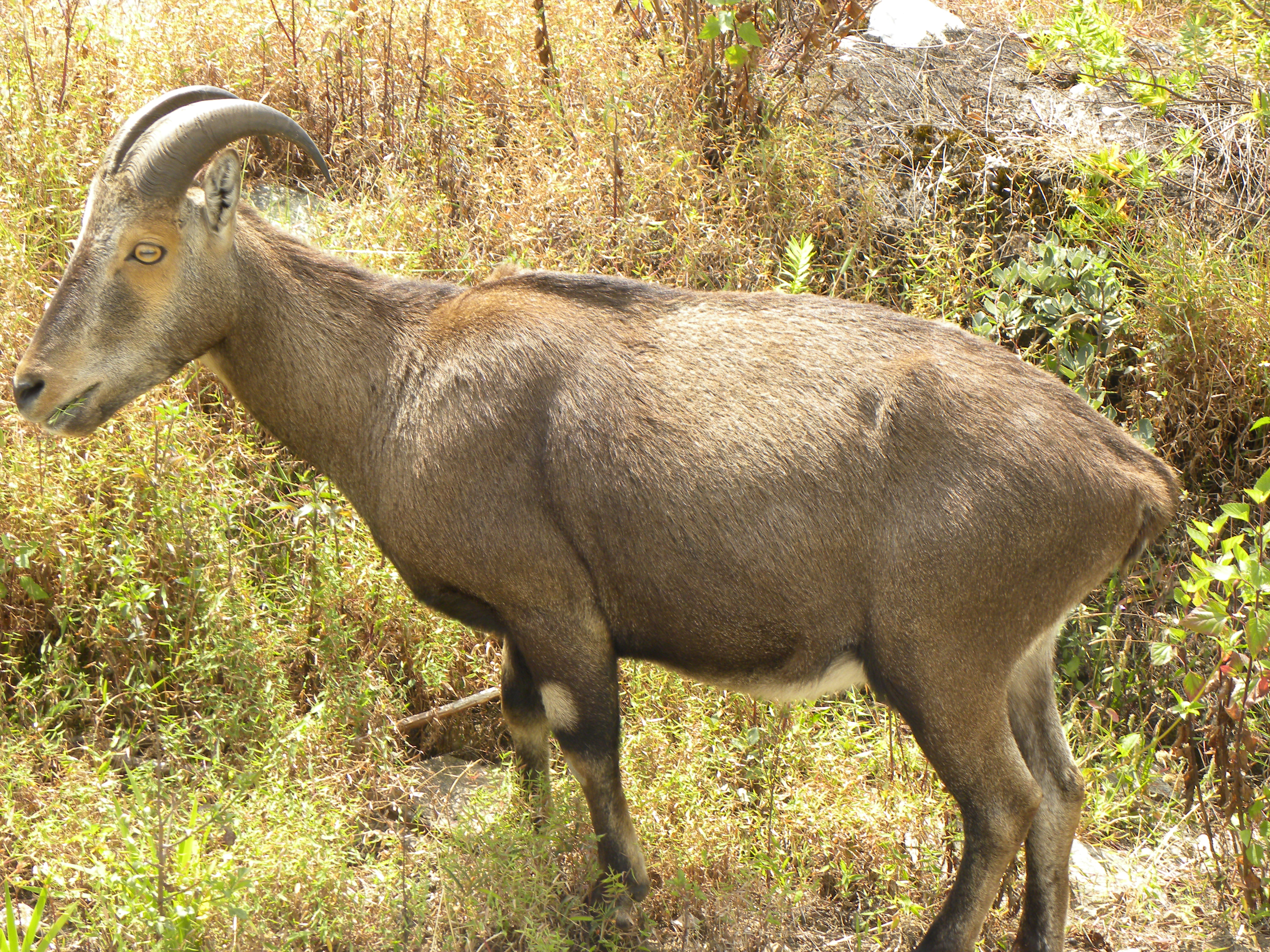
- A male Nilgiri tahr
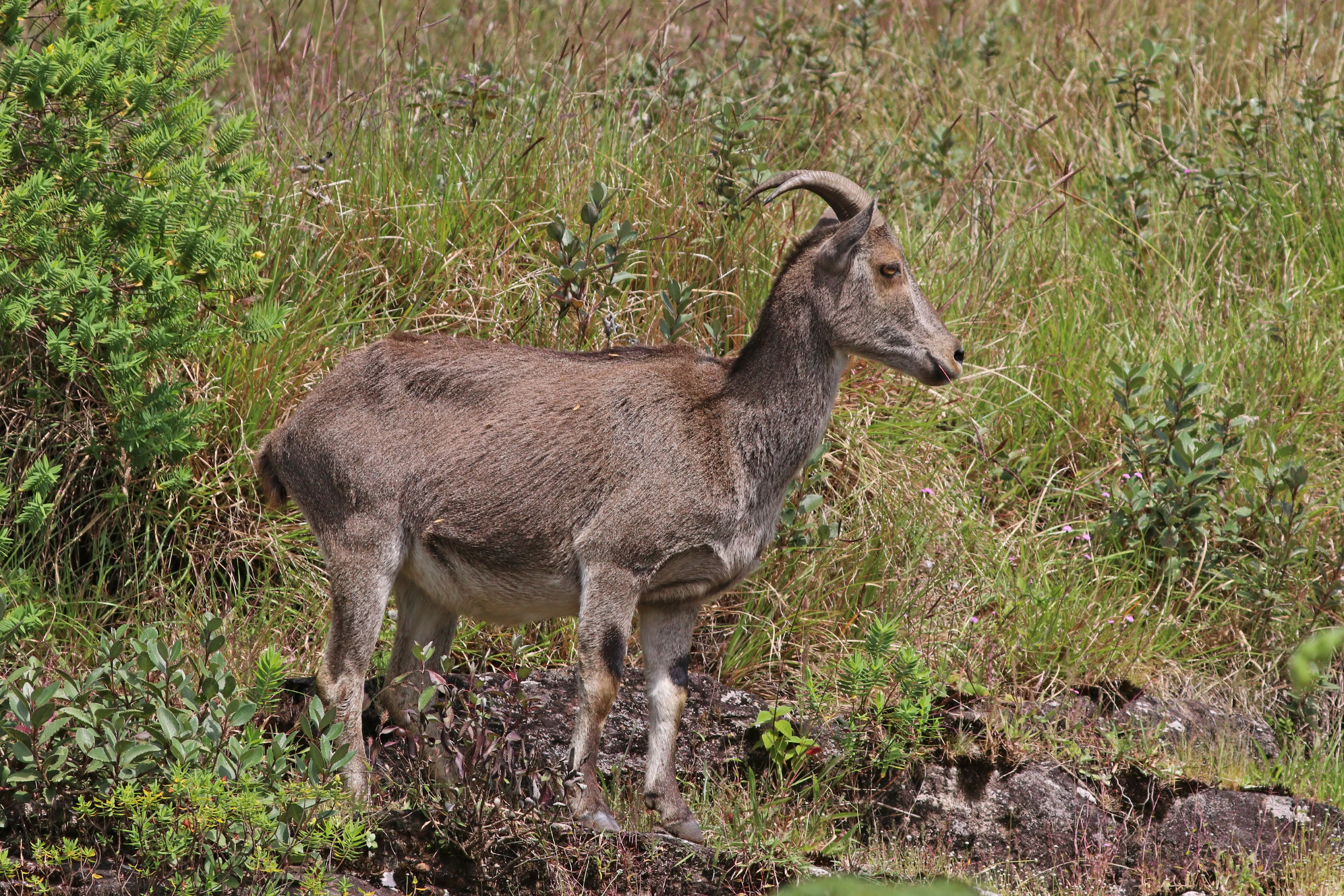
- A female Nilgiri tahr

Conservation status
- Endangered (IUCN 3.1)

Scientific classification
- Kingdom: Animalia
- Phylum: Chordata
- Class: Mammalia
- Order: Artiodactyla
- Family: Bovidae
- Subfamily: Caprinae
- Genus: Nilgiritragus; Ropiquet & Hassanin, 2005
- Species: N. hylocrius

Binomial name
- Nilgiritragus hylocrius (Ogilby, 1838)
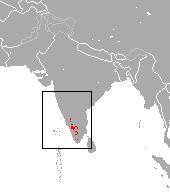
- Distribution of Nilgiri tahr

Synonyms
- Hemitragus hylocrius (Ogilby, 1838)

= Nilgiri tahr =

Species of goat endemic to South India

The Nilgiri tahr (Note: Varaiaadu in Tamil and Varaiyadu in Malayalam) (Nilgiritragus hylocrius) is an ungulate that is endemic to the Nilgiri Hills and the southern portion of the Western Ghats in the Indian states of Tamil Nadu and Kerala. It is the only species in the genus Nilgiritragus. The species is classified as endangered in the IUCN Red List. It is the state animal of Tamil Nadu.

The Nilgiri tahr was first described as Capra warryato by John Edward Gray in the 19th century. It was later grouped under the same genus with the Arabian and Himalayan tahrs. However, based on a 2005 phylogenetic, it was reclassified into the news genus Nilgiritragus, and shares a common ancestor with the genus Ovis.

The Nilgiri tahr is a stocky mountain goat with short, coarse yellowish-brown fur. The adult males stand about 100 cm (39 in) tall and weigh 80–100 kg (180–220 lb). The males are larger than the females, and have a bristly mane on the back of the neck and a distinctive patch on the saddle. Both sexes have backward-curving horns, which can measure up to 40 cm (16 in). They are agile, and avid climbers, with a keen eye sight.

The Nilgiri tahr is mostly limited to the Nilgiri and Anamalai Hills, with the largest population occurring in the Eravikulam National Park. Key populations also occur in Mukurthi and Grass Hills National Park in Tamil Nadu, with smaller, isolated groups in Ponmudi Hills and Parambikulam in Kerala, and few districts of Tamil Nadu. The species inhabits high-altitude grasslands interspersed with shola forests, and favors rocky cliffs and open plateaus. Historically widespread across the Western Ghats region, the population dropped sharply due to hunting and habitat loss, with only a few hundred left in the wild by the late 20th century. Conservation efforts have increased the population, which was recorded at about 3,122 individuals in 2015, and 2,655 individuals in 2025.

== Etymology ==
The genus name Nilgiritragus is derived from the combination of Sanskrit words 'Nila' meaning 'blue' and 'Giri' meaning hills, referring to the Nilgiri Hills and the Greek word trágos meaning 'goat'.

== Taxonomy ==
In the later 19th century, the Nilgiri tahr was described as Capra warryato by John Edward Gray. It was later placed in the genus Hemitragus together with the Arabian tahr (Arabitragus jayakari) and the Himalayan tahr (H. jemlahicus). A 2005 phylogenetic analysis showed that the Himalayan and Arabian tahr are sister of the genus Capra while the Nilgiri tahr is related to the genus Ovis, and it was therefore separated into the monotypic genus Nilgiritragus. The genetic divergence from the common ancestor of Ovis and Nilgiritragus is estimated to have happened about 2.7 to 5.2 million years ago. The separation of the southern population in the Anaimalai Hills from the northern population in the Nilgiris across the Palakkad Gap occurred about 1.5 million years ago.

== Description ==
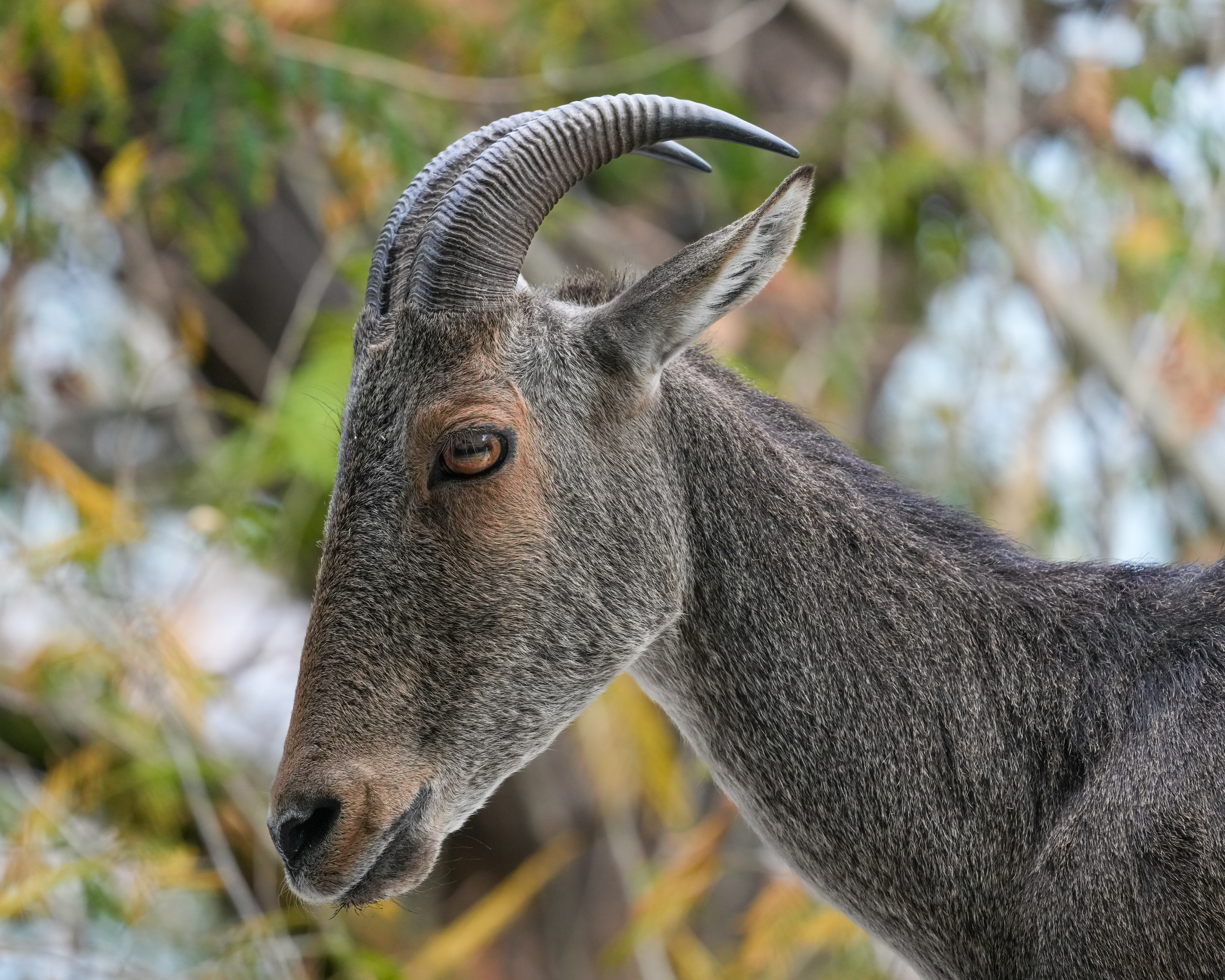
Closeup of the head

The Nilgiri tahr is a stocky built goat with a short and coarse fur covering the entire body. Adult males stand about 100 cm (39 in) tall at the shoulder and weigh 80 to 100 kg (180 to 220 lb). Males are larger than females, have a darker coloured fur after maturation, and a bristly mane on the back of the neck and withers. The fur is dark yellowish brown on the above with a pale underside. The females and juveniles might have a greyish fur. Adult males have a dark patch on their backs, and are also called "saddlebacks".

Both sexes have two curved horns, which can reach up to 40 cm (16 in) in males and 30 cm (12 in) in females. The horns are convex on the anterior or outer side, with shallow ridges along the surface. The horns run parallel to each other from the top of the head for some distance before diverging from each other towards the tip.

== Distribution and habitat ==
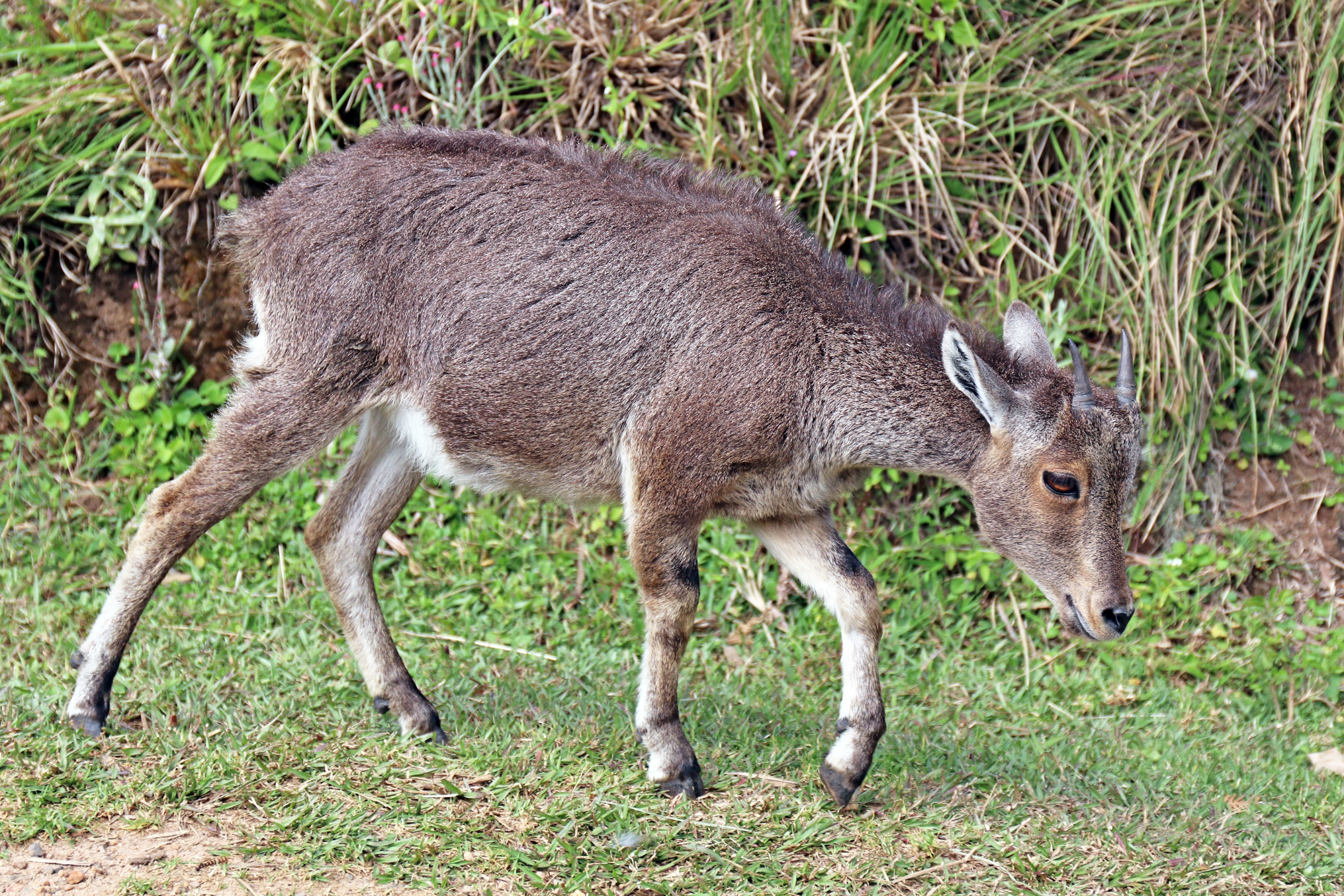
A juvenile at Eravikulam National Park

The Nilgiri tahr is endemic to the Nilgiri hills and the Anamalai Hills in the southern Western Ghats of South India. The extant range of the Nilgiri tahr extends over 400 km (250 mi) from north to south, and Eravikulam National Park in Kerala is home to the largest population. In Tamil Nadu, the main concentrations of the tahr population are in Mukurthi and Grass Hills National Park, with occasional sightings in other areas of the Nilgiris region. Isolated populations have been found to exist in Ponmudi Hills and Parambikulam Tiger Reserve in Kerala, and parts of Dindigul, Kanyakumari, Theni, and Tirunelveli districts in Tamil Nadu.

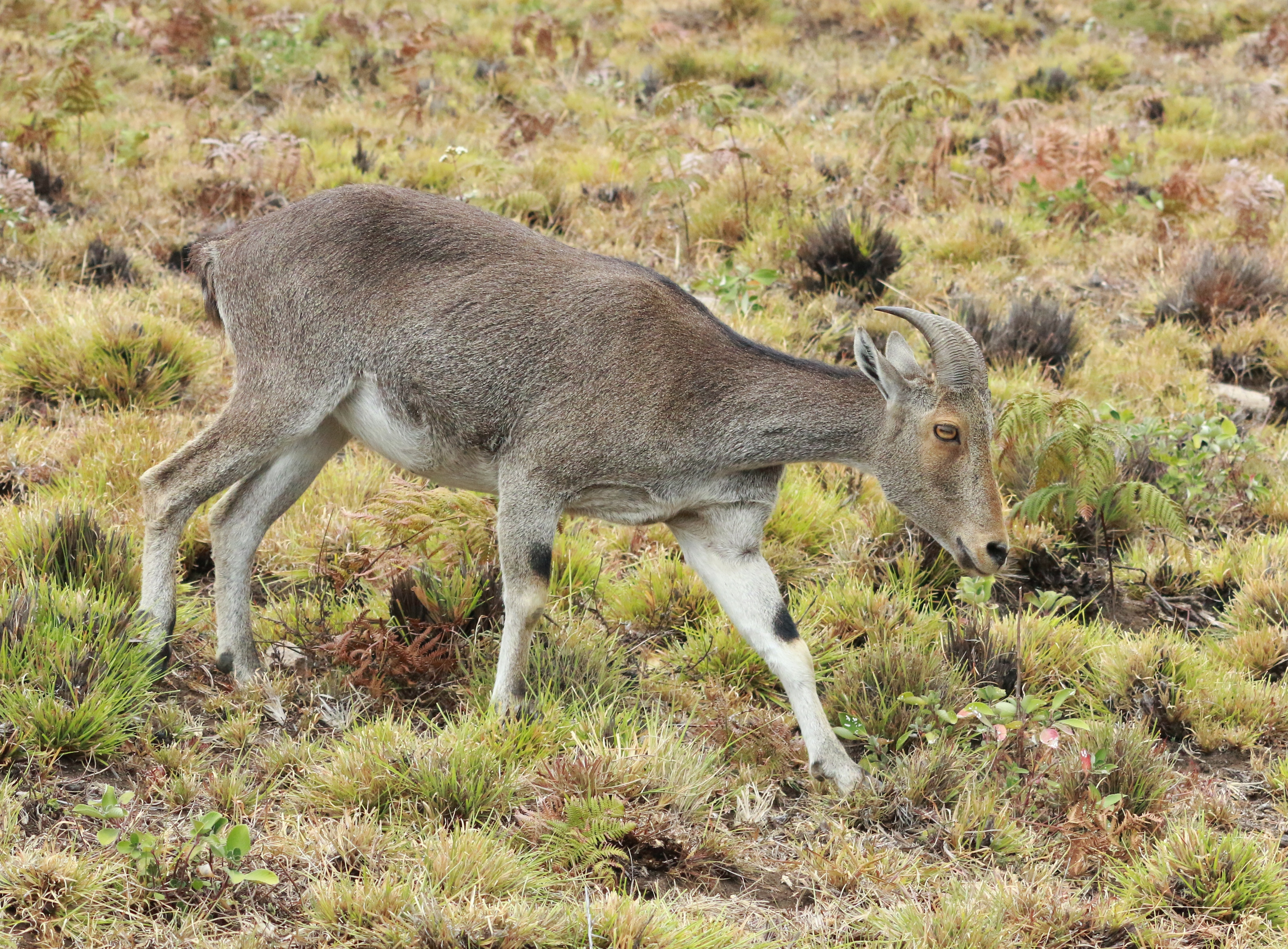
The Nilgiri Tahr inhabits open grasslands on rocky outcrops

Historically, as per the Tamil Sangam literature, the goats were widely distributed from Coimbatore in the Western Tamil Nadu to Tirunelveli in the Southern part of Tamil Nadu. However, only about a hundreds of Nilgiri tahrs were left in the wild by the end of 20th century. Since that time, conservation activities have helped increase their numbers. The Nilgiri tahr population was estimated at about 3,122 individuals in 2015. In April 2025, the second synchronized Nilgiri tahr survey conducted jointly by the forest departments of Tamil Nadu and Kerala recorded a total of 2,655 individuals–1,352 in Kerala and 1,303 in Tamil Nadu. There were 841 individuals in the Eravikulam National Park in 2025, up from 894 individuals in 2014, and 640 during the first census in 1996.

The Nilgiri tahr inhabits the open grasslands of the South Western Ghats montane rain forests. They typically inhabit rocky outcroppings and precipices, at elevations ranging from 1,200 to 2,600 m (3,900 to 8,500 ft), though sometimes found at lower elevations. During the survey in 2025, low-elevation sightings were reported in Peyanar at about 270 m (890 ft) above sea level, the lowest altitude recorded for the species. They usually keep clear of forests at lower altitudes and occupy large open grasslands interspersed with pockets of stunted forests, locally known as shola. The Nilgiri tahrs formerly ranged over a larger extent across the grasslands of the Western Ghats, but hunting and poaching in the 19th century reduced their population.

== Behaviour ==
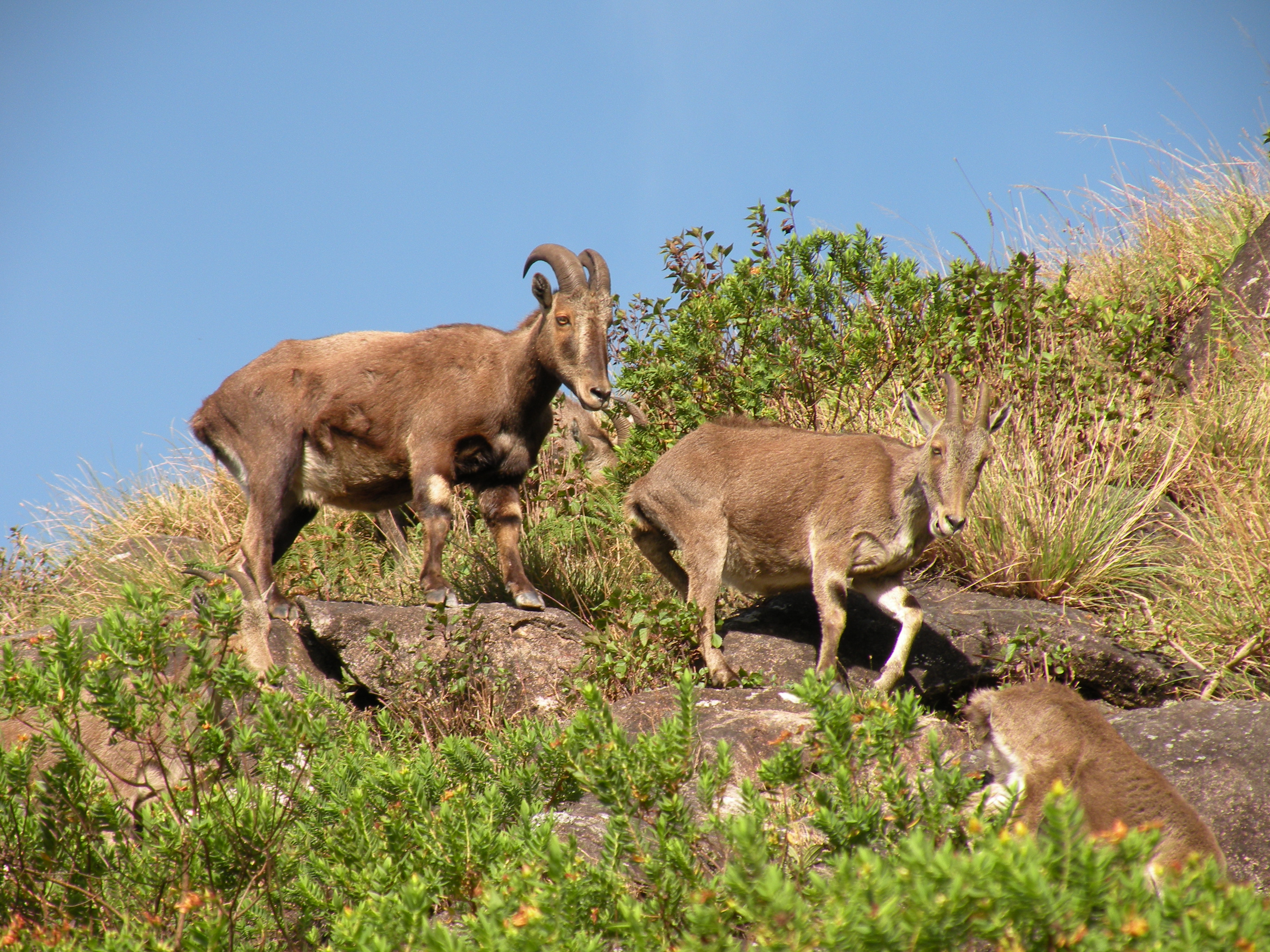
A male (left) courting a female

The Nilgiri tahrs are usually seen feeding on the edges on rocky plateaus and grasslands in the mornings and evenings, and resting on ridges during the day. They usually feed on grass and small shrubs. They are usually found in groups of 150 to 200 individuals. They are nimble goats, and are excellent rock climbers. They often climb narrow and high ridges, maintaining a good balance and agility. The tahrs have a good eye sight, and are often look out for dangers during the day. They usually feed in groups, and an old female keep watch during the time.

=== Breeding ===
The peak breeding season of the Nilgiri tahrs coincide with the monsoon season from June to September, though it has been observed to breed throughout the year. The younglings are usually born in January or February during the cold season, and the goats might yearn up to two offspring at a time. The males often engage in fights for rights to access to the females. They often stand with the sides to each other, and use their horns to attack the other. The dominant male gets access to the females, but the loser is not chased out of the herd unlike certain other goat families. The 2025 survey found a sex ratio of 49 males per 100 females, and a young-to-female ratio of 50 to 100.

== Threats and conservation ==
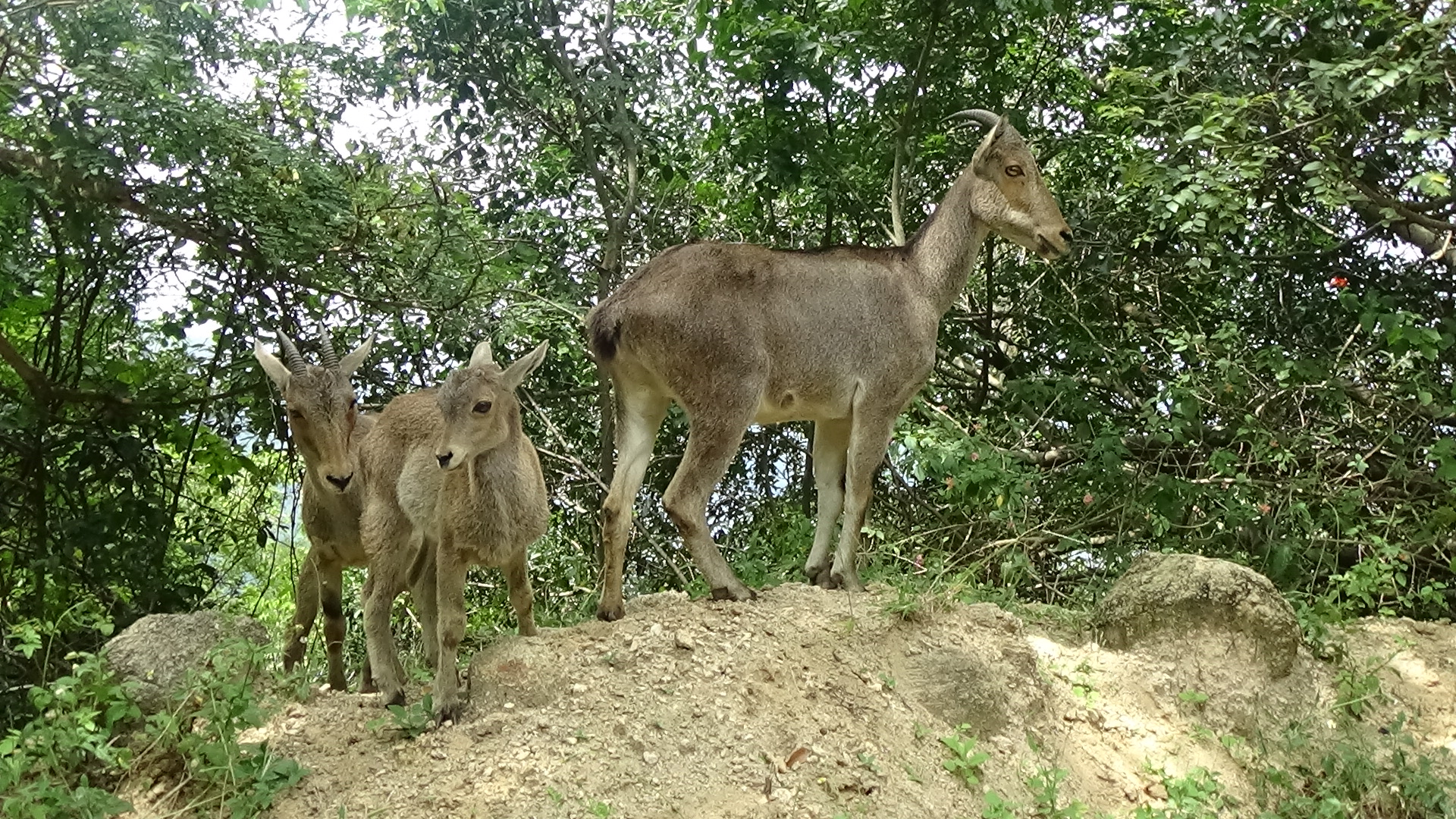
Nilgiri tahrs at the Anamalai Tiger Reserve

The Nilgiri tahr is classified as endangered in the IUCN Red List. The species is primarily threatened by habitat loss and disturbance caused by invasive species, and in some sites by livestock grazing, poaching and fragmentation of the landscape. The species is legally protected in India, and is safe guarded in various protected areas and national parks in Kerala and Tamil Nadu. The Bombay Natural History Society, Nilgiri Wildlife Association, and Wildlife Institute of India, are involved in scientific research, community engagement, and education programmes. The 'Project Nilgiri Tahr', launched by the Government of Tamil Nadu in 2022, is aimed at conserving the species through restoration of grasslands, radio-collaring and monitoring of populations, and plans for captive breeding and reintroduction. The Government of Tamil Nadu also declared 7 October as the 'Nilgiri Tahr Day' in Tamil Nadu, which is the birthday of conservationist E. R. C. Davidar.

There is a small captive population of Nilgiri tahrs across the world, estimated to be about 30 individuals in North America and 20 individuals in Asia outside India.

== See also ==
- Nilgiri Biosphere Reserve
- Wildlife of India
