= Convex =

Convex or convexity may refer to:

== Science and technology ==
- Convex lens, in optics

=== Mathematics ===
- Convex set, containing the whole line segment that joins points
  - Convex polygon, a polygon which encloses a convex set of points
  - Convex polytope, a polytope with a convex set of points
  - Convex metric space, a generalization of the convexity notion in abstract metric spaces
- Convex function, when the line segment between any two points on the graph of the function lies above or on the graph
- Convex conjugate, of a function
- Convexity (algebraic geometry), a restrictive technical condition for algebraic varieties originally introduced to analyze Kontsevich moduli spaces

== Economics and finance ==
- Convexity (finance), second derivatives in financial modeling generally
- Convexity in economics
- Bond convexity, a measure of the sensitivity of the duration of a bond to changes in interest rates
- Convex preferences, an individual's ordering of various outcomes

== Other uses ==
- Convex Computer, a former company that produced supercomputers

== See also ==
- List of convexity topics
- Non-convexity (economics), violations of the convexity assumptions of elementary economics
- Obtuse angle
