= E. R. C. Davidar =

Indian naturalist

- Born: 7 October 1922
- Died: April 2010 (aged 87); Puducherry
- Occupation: Naturalist
- Children: Priya Davidar (Daughter), Mark Davidar (son)

E. R. C. Davidar (Tamil: ஈ. ஆர். சி. டேவிதார்) was an Indian naturalist, scholar and lawyer. He is remembered for the first survey of the Nilgiri tahr in 1975 over western ghat range, conducting the first study in India on elephant corridors and taking an active part in the protection of the Nilgiris.

== Earlier days ==
He became interested in wildlife through hunting in Uthagamandalam and Coonoor. Before banning hunting in India via Wildlife Protection Act of 1972, He enlisted the cooperation of the licensed hunters. Later he turned to conserve wildlife. In 1963, he studied the status of the Nilgiri tahr. In 1975 he published the detailed survey of Tahr in the Journal of the Bombay Natural History Association. The animal then entered into the Red Data Book of the International Union for Conservation of Nature and plans.

He was the secretary of the Planters’ Association in the Nilgiris and a member of various conservation organizations. He has published several books including notable works like Whispers from the Wild: Writings by E.R.C. Davidar and Cheetal Walk: Living in the Wilderness. He has also published stories for children and guidebooks on wildlife sanctuaries. After his retirement in 1981, he devoted his time for wild life conservation. He founded Sigur Nature Trust in June 2005. He passed in April 2010 in puducherry.

== Remembrance ==
For his contribution to wildlife conservation, the Hall of Fame of the Tamil Nadu Forest Department was inaugurated on 31 January 2016 by former Minister M. S. M. Anandan. The Hall of Fame is now permanently at the Tamil Nadu Forest Academy, Coimbatore. In 2023, Tamil Nadu government has declared 7 October as Nilgiri Tahr Day in honour of him.
