= Édouard Harlé =

French railway engineer (1850–1922)

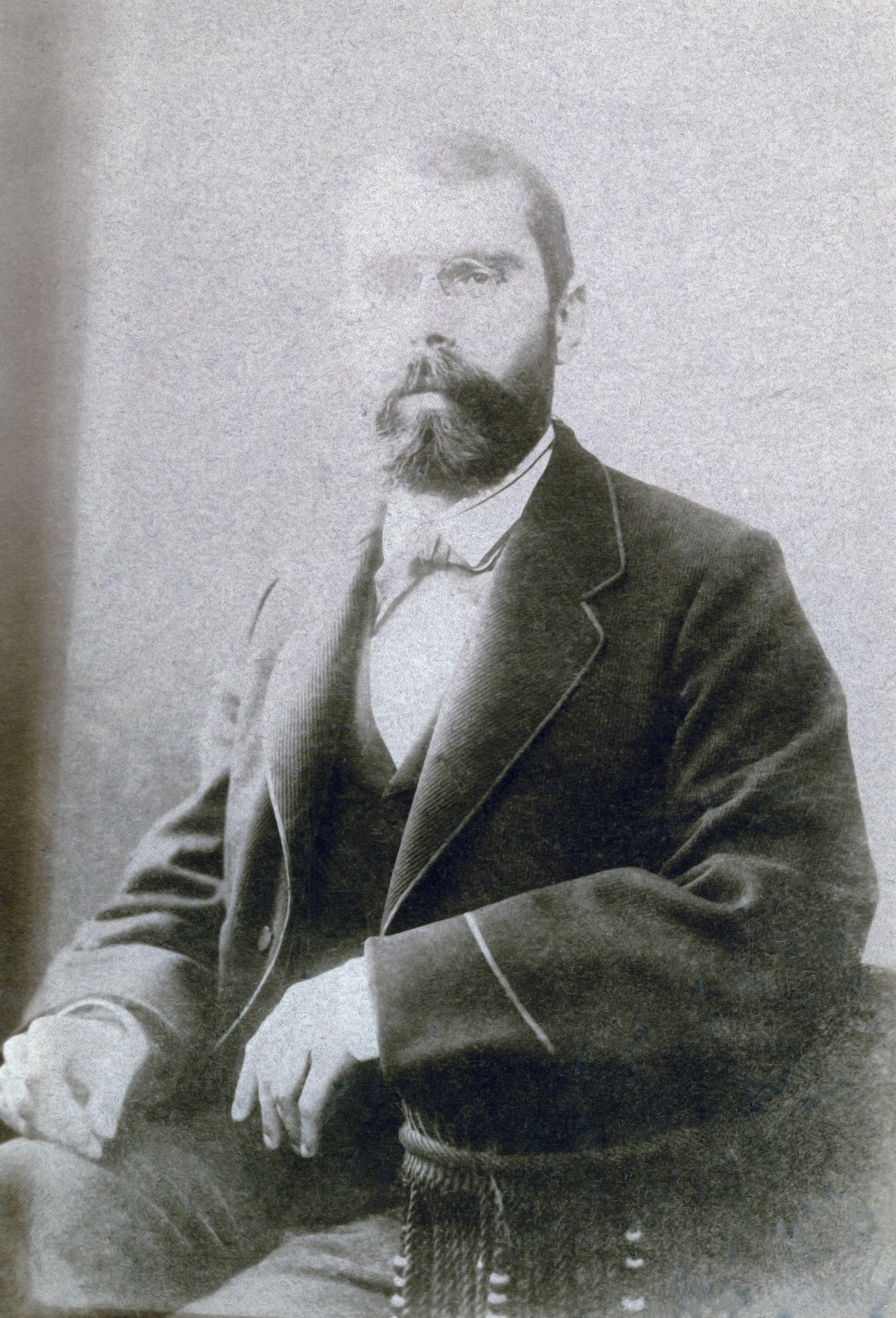
Édouard Harlé

Édouard Harlé (1850, Toulouse – 1922, Bordeaux) was a French railway engineer (Ingénieur des ponts et chaussées) and prehistorian.

Édouard Harlé was a Director of the Chemin de Fer du Midi.

His collections of prehistoric artefacts are held by Muséum d'histoire naturelle de Bordeaux and Muséum de Toulouse.

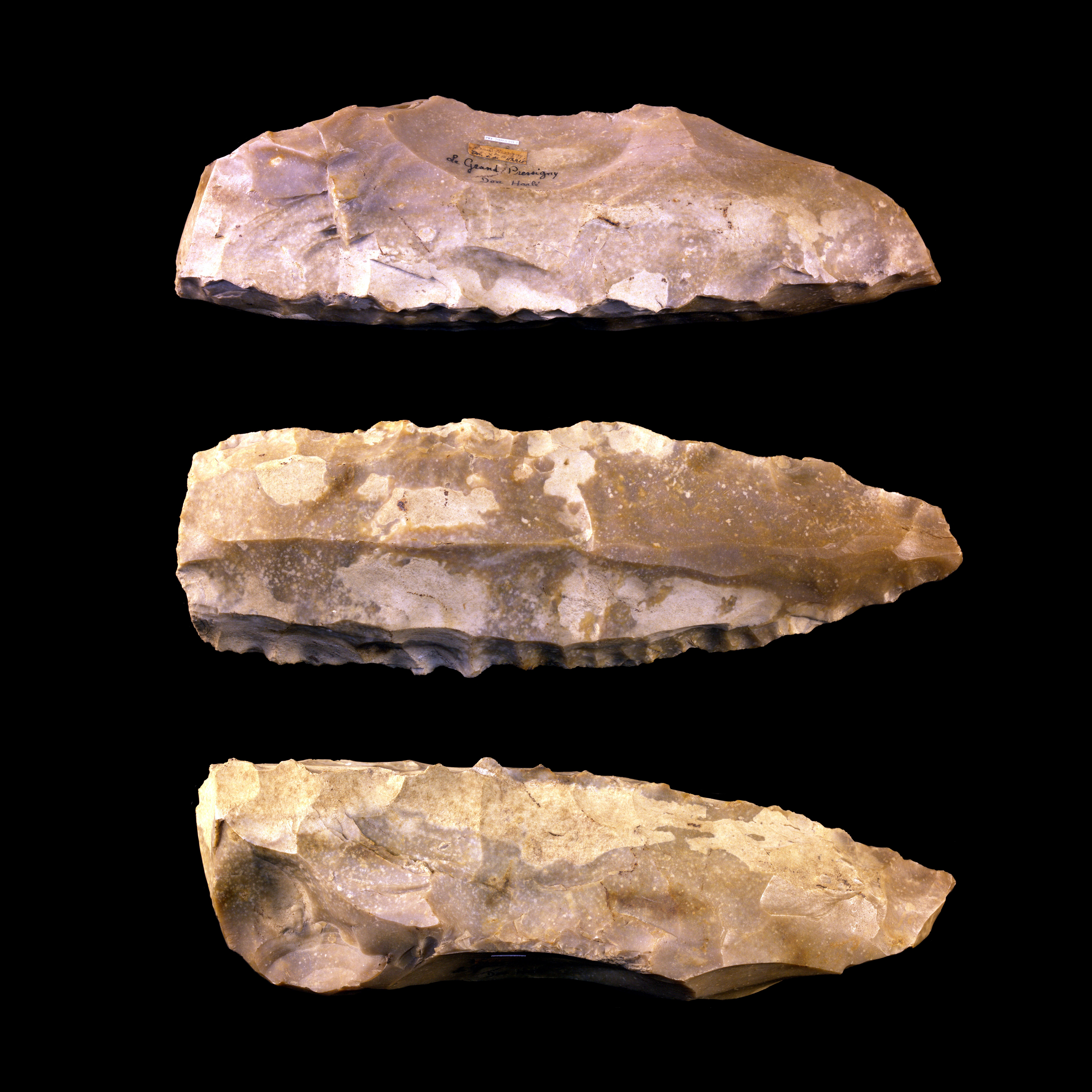
Nucléus Pressignien - Coll. Hallé - MHNT

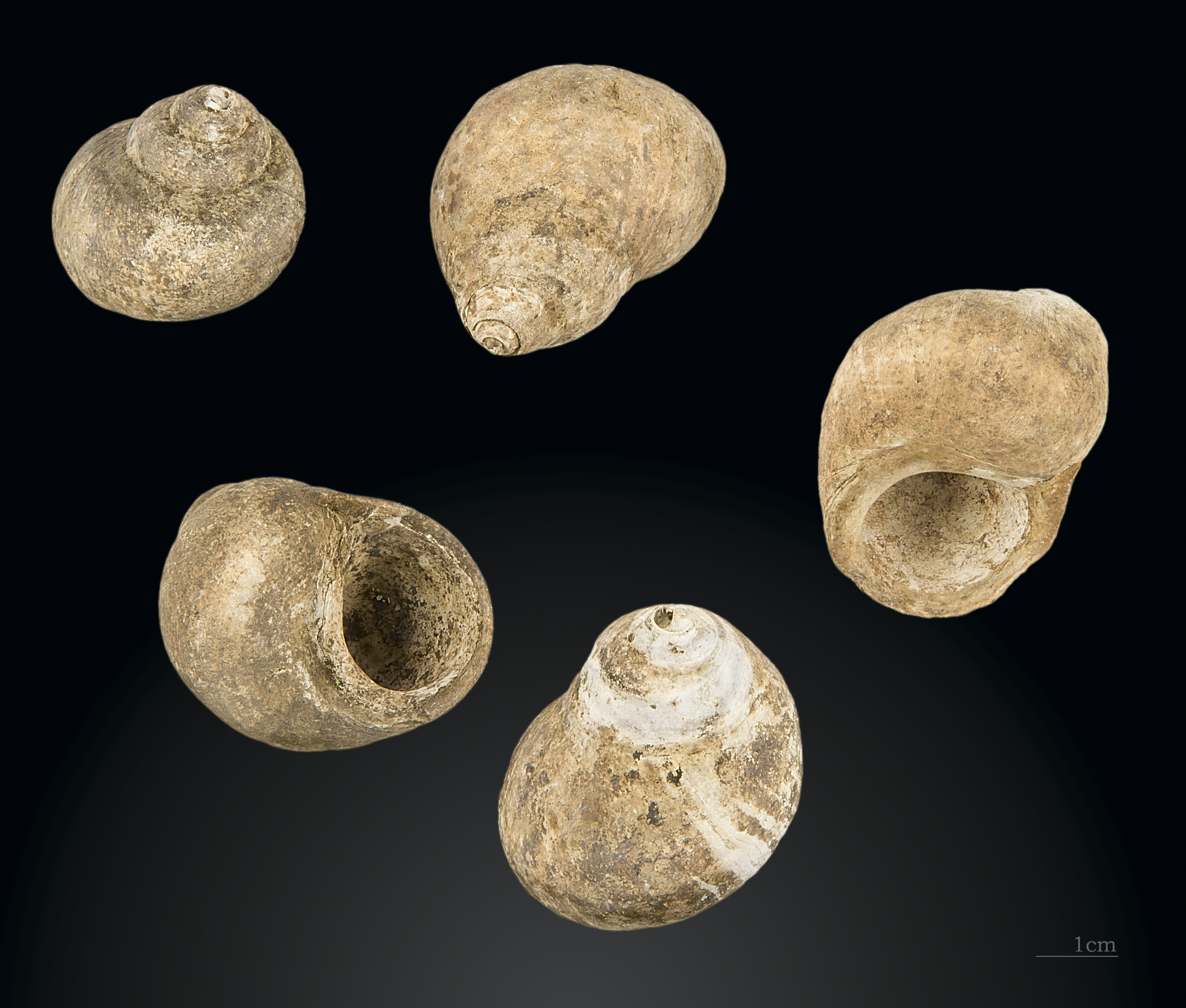
Bigorneaux d'Altamira Fouille de 1881 - MHNT

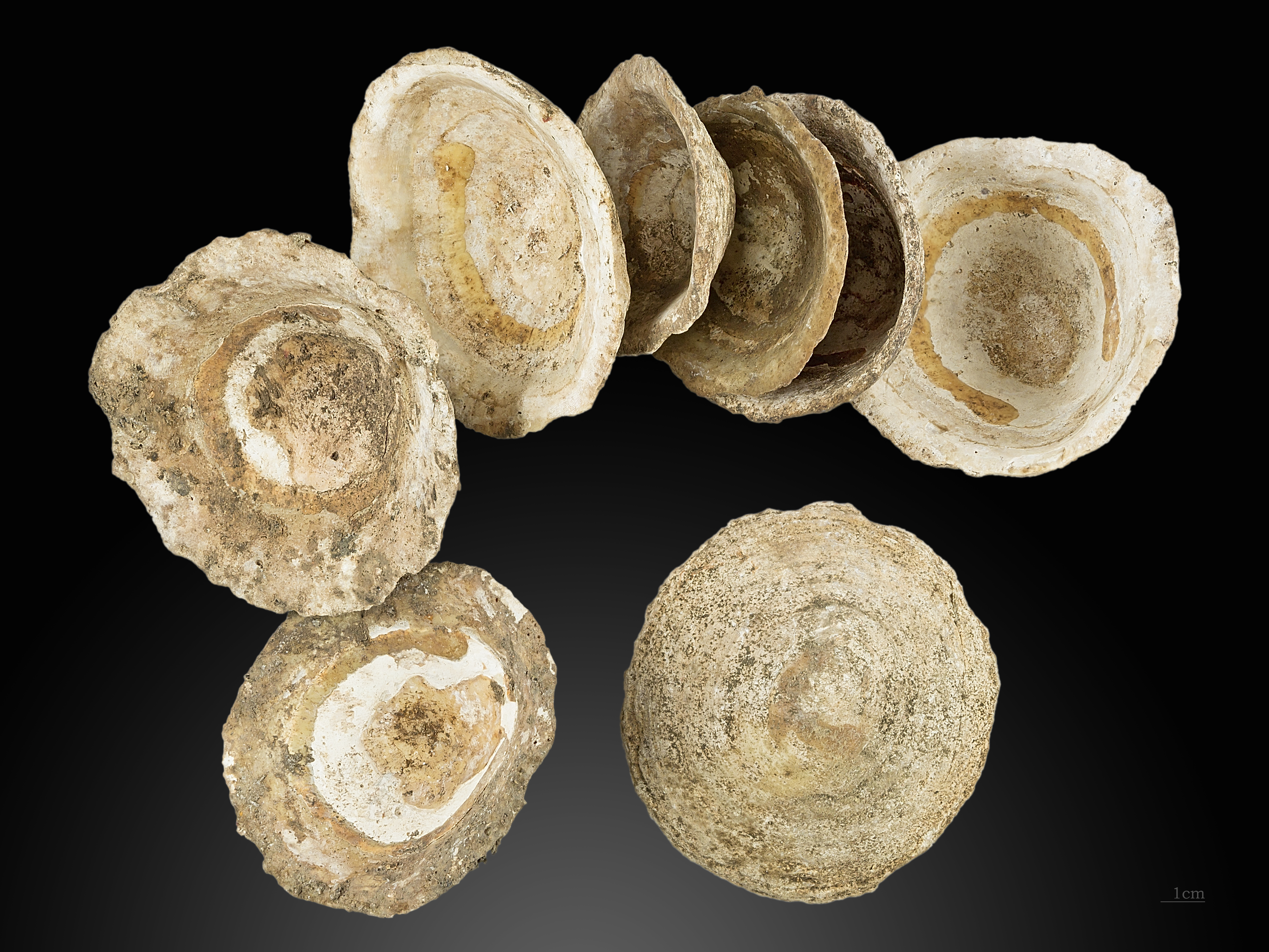
Patelles d'Altamira Fouille de 1881 - MHNT

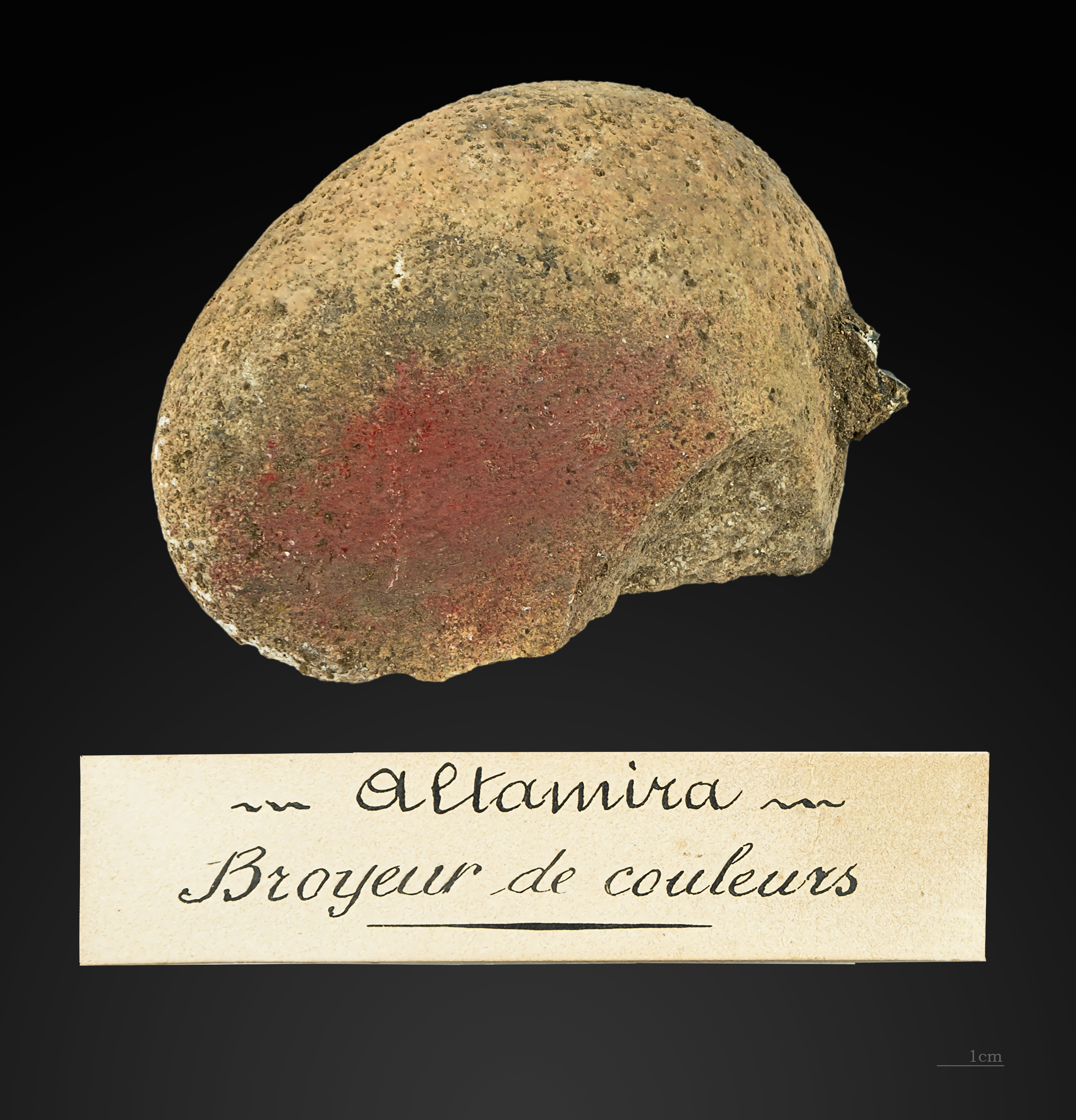
Boyeur de couleur d'Altamira Fouille de 1881 - MHNT

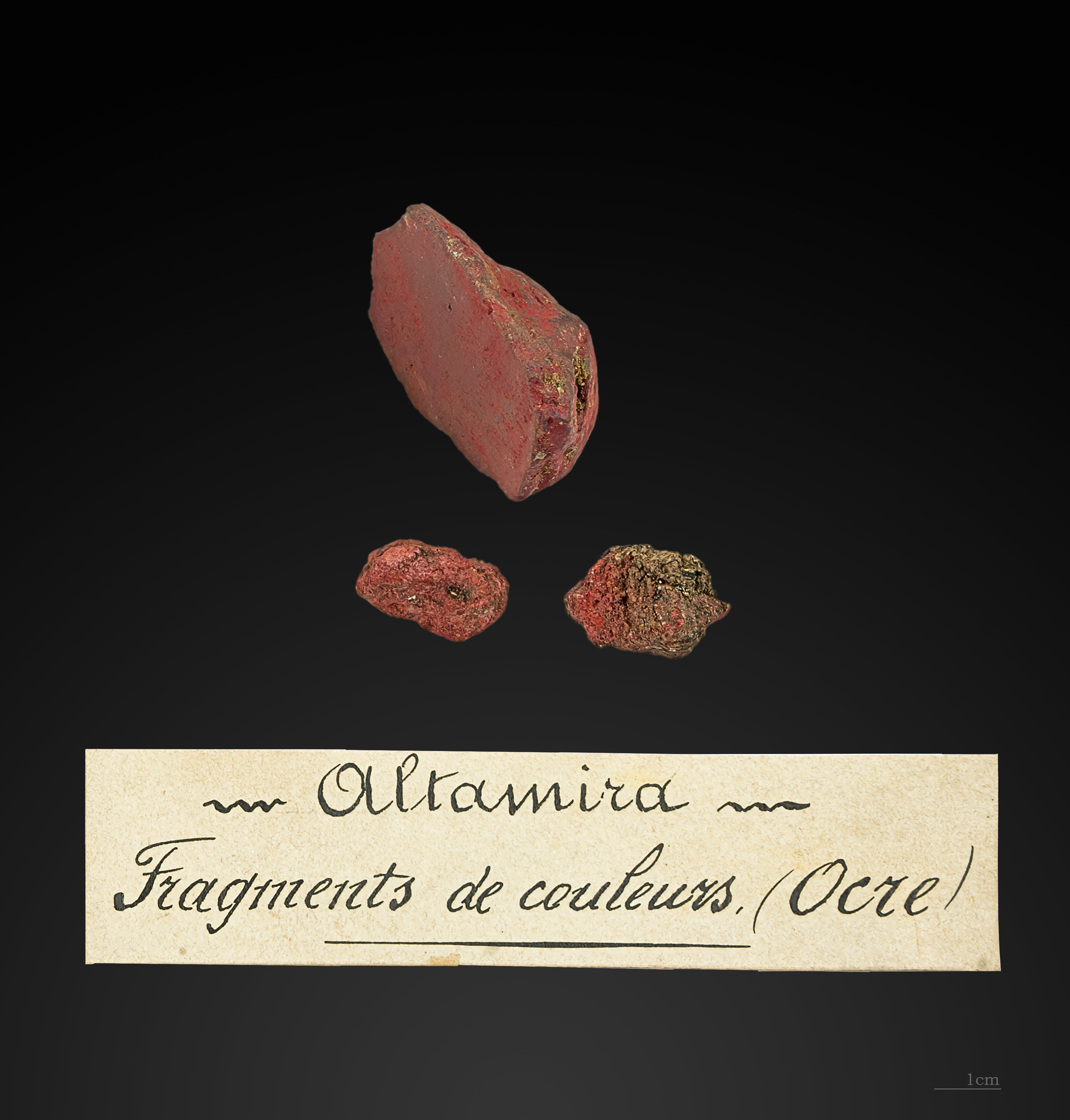
Pigment d'Altamira Fouille de 1881 - MHNT
