= Grass Hills National Park =

Protected area in the Western Ghats, India

- Interactive map of Grass Hills National Park
- Location: India
- Coordinates: 10.3410227°N 76.9856427°E

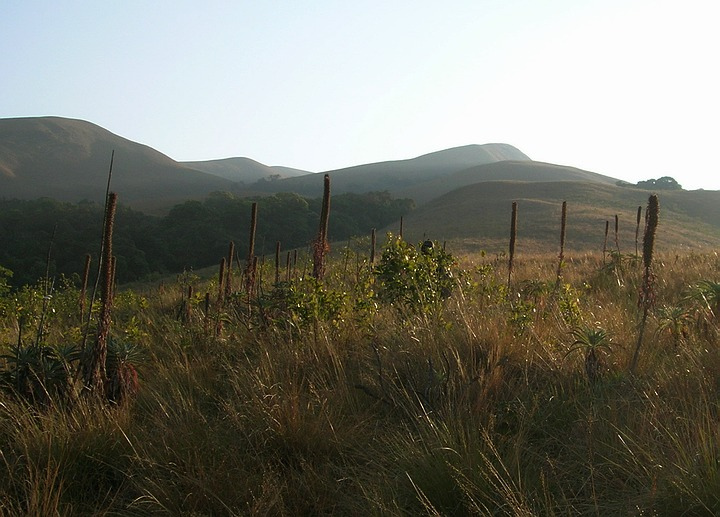
Trek route to Silvemedu peak in the GHNP, Valparai

Grass Hills National Park is a protected area in the Western Ghats, India, and a part of the Anamalai Tiger Reserve, forming its boundary with Eravikulam National Park in neighbouring Kerala state. It is not an actual National Park. It spreads over 65,000 hectares. The landscape is a combination of peaks and high plateaus above 2,000 metres (6,600 ft) MSL composed of montane shola-grassland ecosystem that is unique to the higher ranges of the Western Ghats of Kerala and Tamil Nadu.

The notable peaks are Attuparai Kurukku (6662 ft), Oosi Malai Theri, Kazhuku Chutti Malai, and Silve Medu.
