= Bandipur National Park =

National park in Karnataka, India

Bandipur National park
- IUCN category II (national park)
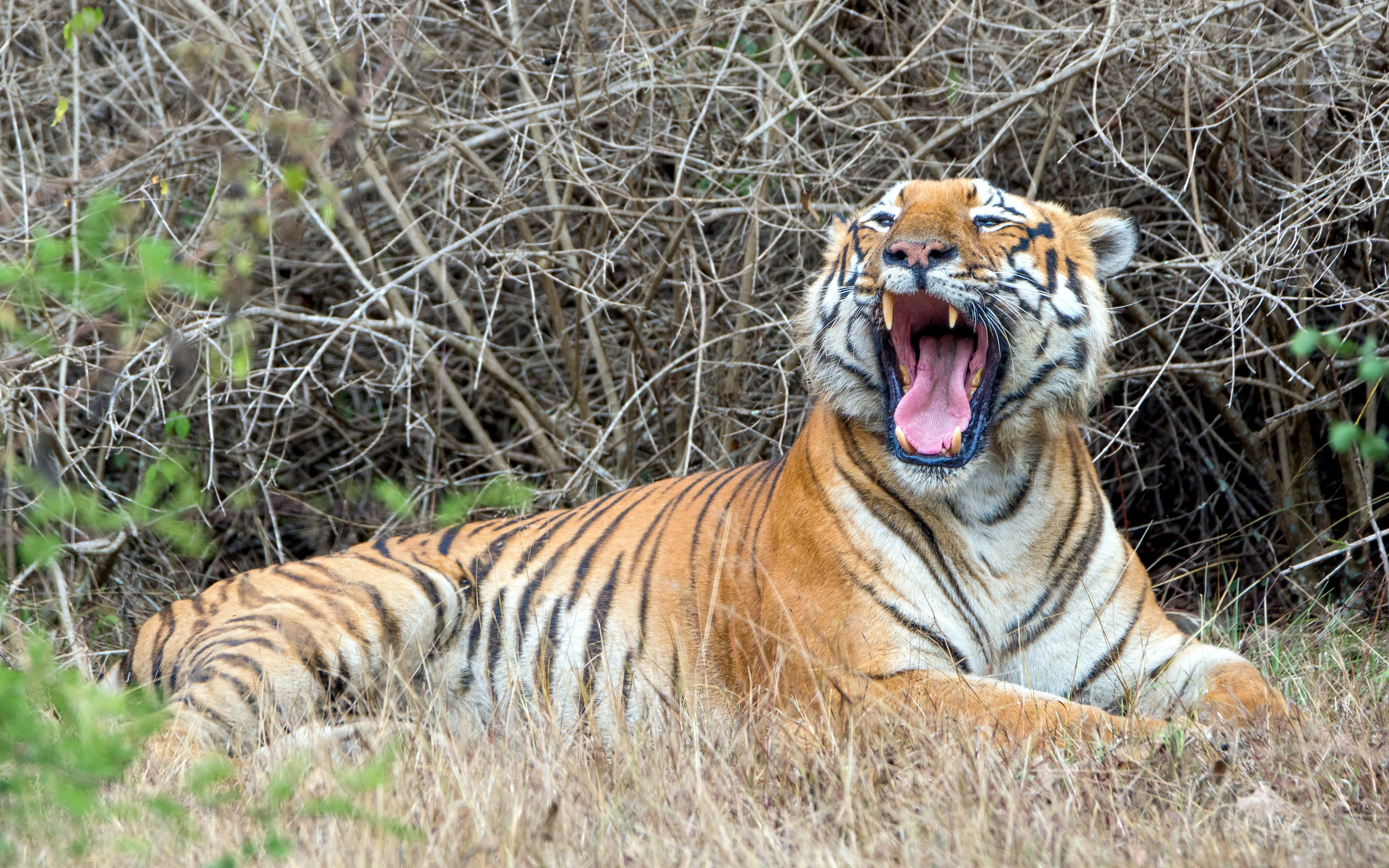
- Bengal tiger in Bandipur National Park

- Location within Karnataka Location within India
- Interactive map of Bandipur National park
- Location: Chamarajanagar district, Karnataka, India
- Nearest city: Chamarajanagar 50 kilometers (31 mi), Mysore 80 kilometers (50 mi)
- Coordinates: 11°39′42″N 76°37′38″E
- Area: 1,456.3 km^{2} (562.3 sq mi)
- Established: 1973
- Governing body: Ministry of Environment and Forests, Karnataka Forest Department
- Website: bandipurtigerreserve.in

Bandipur National Park is a national park covering 1,456.3 km^{2} (562.3 sq mi) in Chamarajnagar district in the Indian state of Karnataka. It was established as a tiger reserve under Project Tiger in 1973. It is part of the Nilgiri Biosphere Reserve since 1986.

== History ==
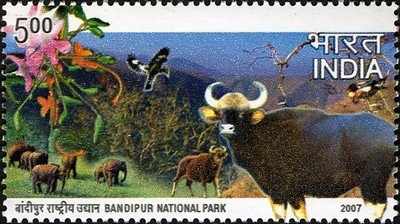
2007 Indian stamp of Bandipur National Park

The Maharaja of the Kingdom of Mysore created a sanctuary of 90 km^{2} (35 sq mi) in 1931 and named it the Venugopala Wildlife Park. In 1973, Bandipur Tiger Reserve was established under Project Tiger by adding nearly 800 km^{2} (310 sq mi) to the Venugopala Wildlife Park.

== Geography ==
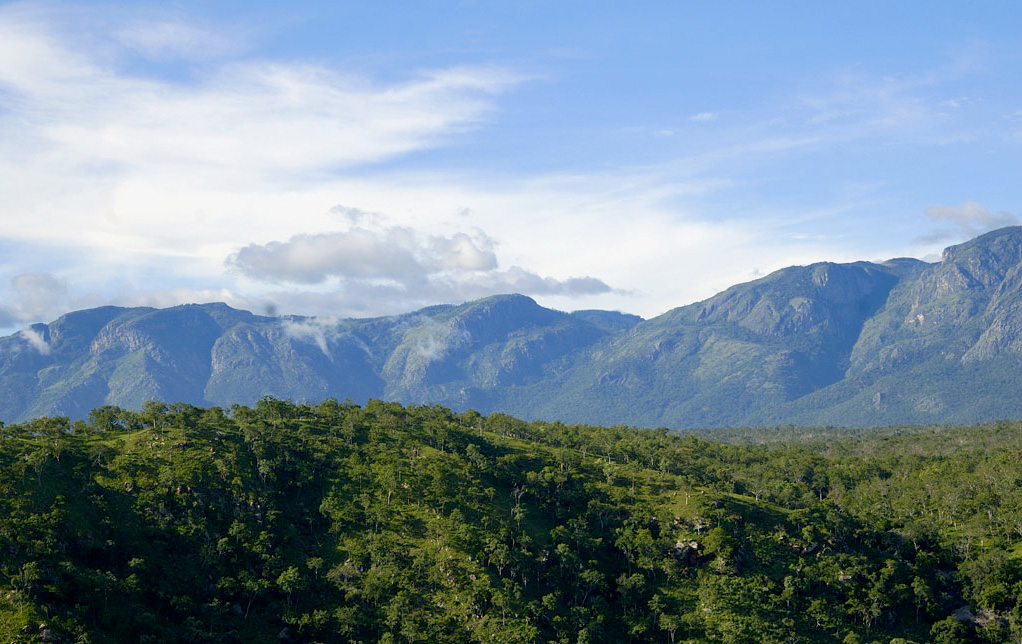
At the Moyar gorge with Nilgiris in the background

Bandipur National Park is located between 75° 12' 17" E to 76° 51' 32" E and 11° 35' 34" N to 11° 57' 02" N where the Deccan Plateau meets the Western Ghats, and the altitude of the park ranges from 680 m (2,230 ft) to 1,454 m (4,770 ft). As a result, the park has a variety of biomes including dry deciduous forests, moist deciduous forests and shrublands. The wide range of habitats helps support a diverse range of organisms. The park is flanked by the Kabini river in the north and the Moyar in the south. The Nugu river runs through the park. The highest point in the park is on a hill called Himavad Gopalaswamy Betta, where there is a Hindu temple at the summit. Bandipur has typical tropical climate with distinct wet and dry seasons. The dry and hot period usually begins in early March and can last till the arrival of the monsoon rains in June.

== Flora ==
Bandipur supports a wide range of timber trees including: teak (Tectona grandis), rosewood (Dalbergia latifolia), sandalwood (Santalum album V), Indian-laurel (Terminalia tomentosa), Indian kino tree (Pterocarpus marsupium), giant clumping bamboo (Dendrocalamus strictus), clumping bamboo (Bambusa arundinacea) and Grewia tiliaefolia.

There are also several notable flowering and fruiting trees and shrubs including: kadam tree (Adina cordifolia), Indian gooseberry (Emblica officinalis), crape-myrtle (Lagerstroemia lanceolata), axlewood (Anogeissus latifolia), black myrobalan (Terminalia chebula), Schleichera trijuga, Odina wodiar, flame of the forest (Butea monosperma), golden shower tree (Cassia fistula), satinwood (Chloroxylon swietenia), black cutch (Acacia catechu), Shorea talura (E), indigoberry (Randia uliginosa).

== Fauna ==
=== Mammals ===
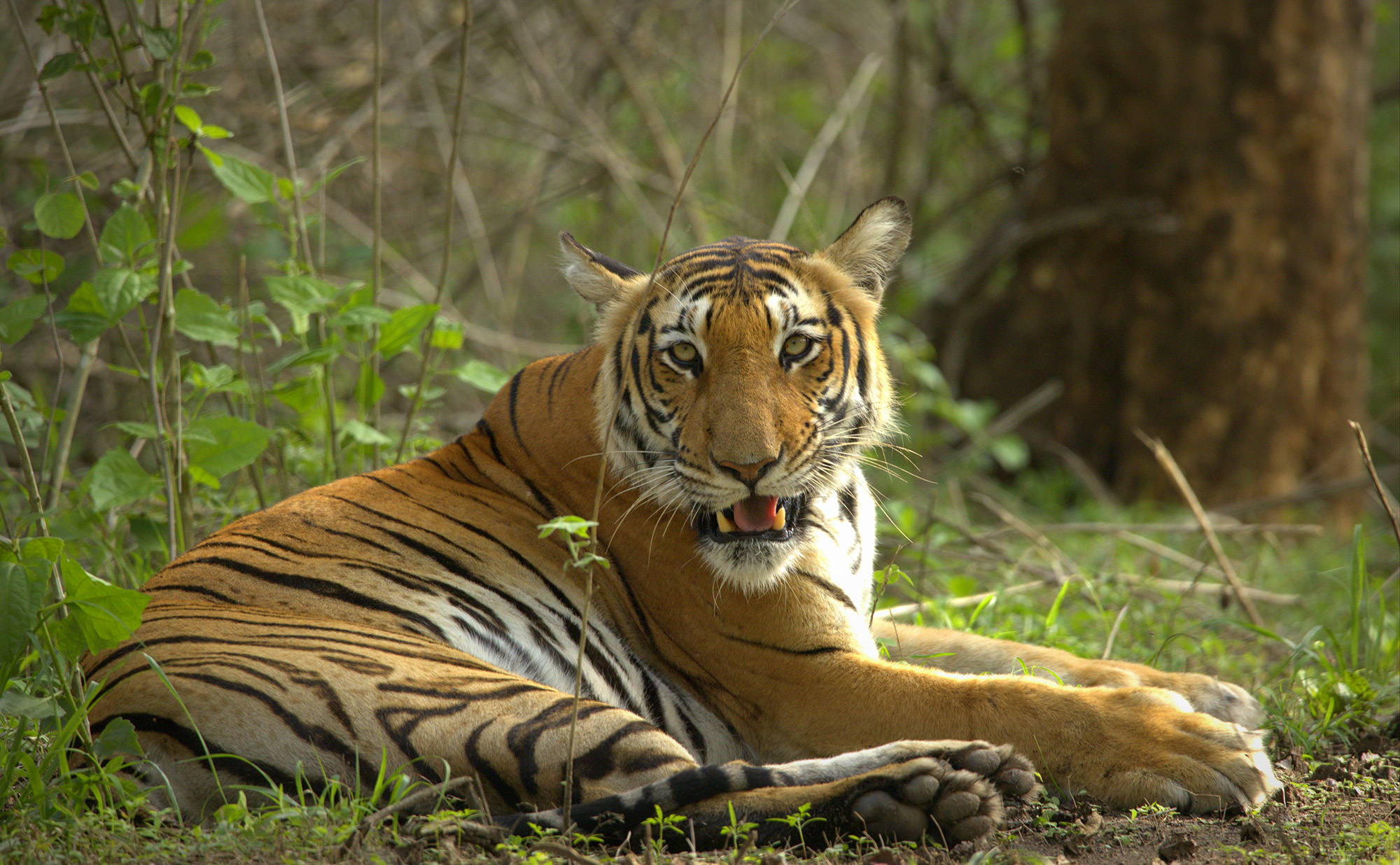
The waterhole female tigress at Bandipur tiger reserve

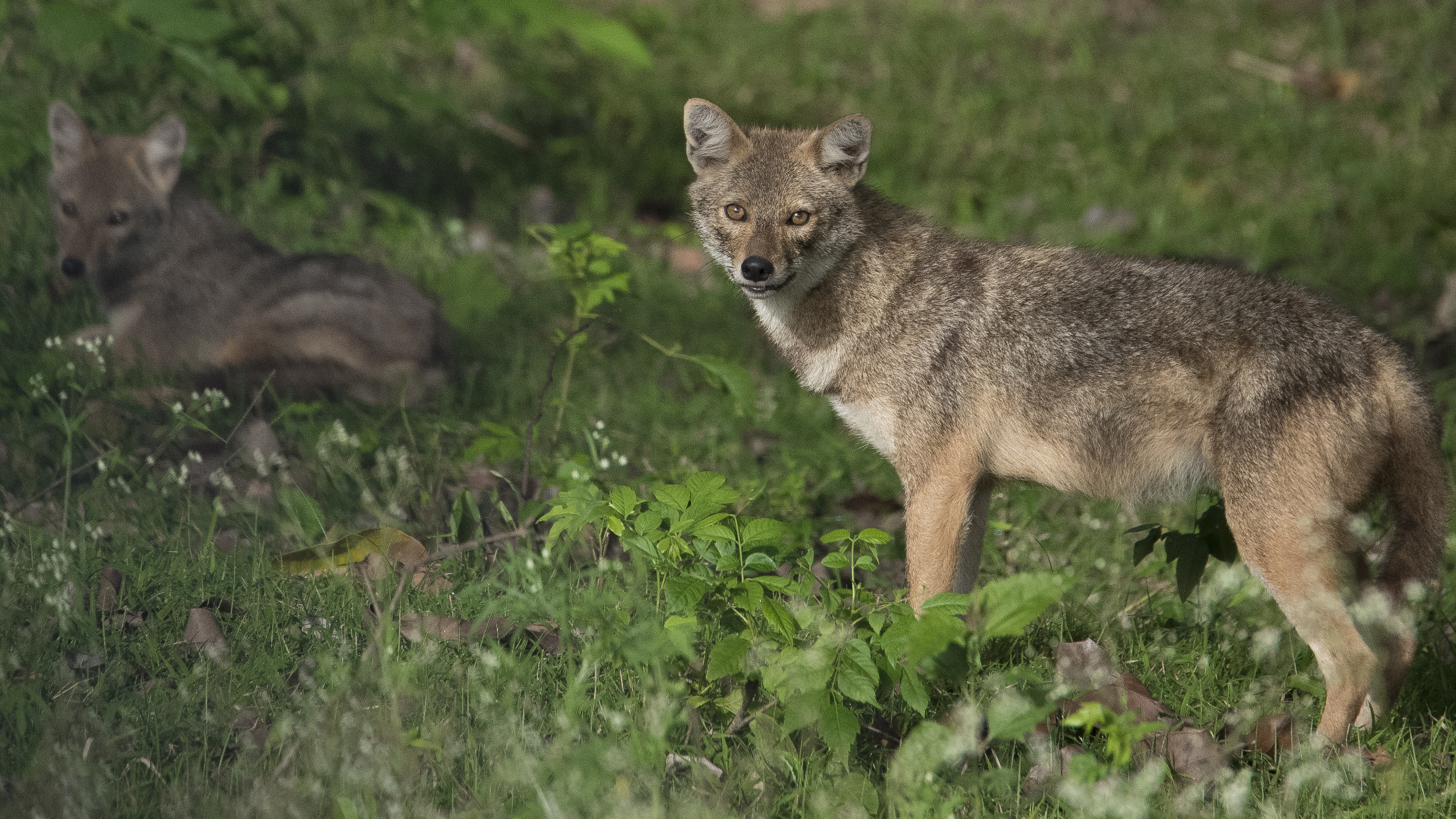
An Indian jackal family alongside the Kabini river in Bandipur National Park

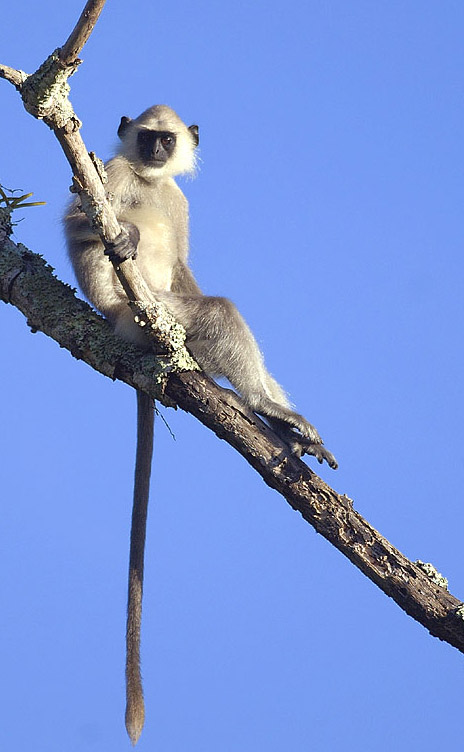
A gray langur

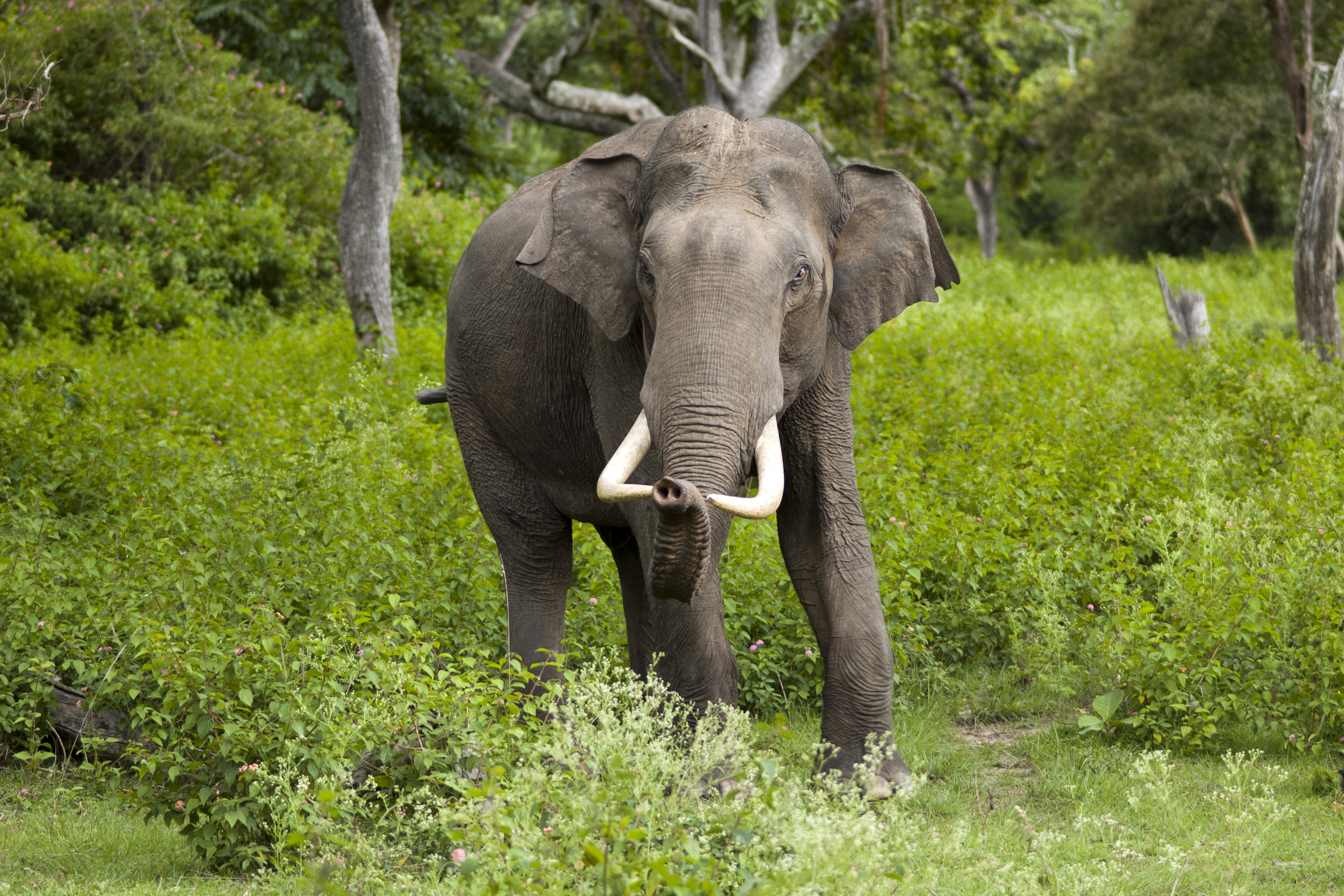
An Asian elephant

Bandipur National Park harbours the Asian elephant, gaur, Bengal tiger, sloth bear, four-horned antelope, golden jackal and dhole. The commonly seen mammals along the public access roads in the park include chital, gray langur, Indian giant squirrel and Indian elephant. A list of medium to large-sized mammals in the park is given in the following census table published in 1997:

species	1991	1993	1995	1997
Bengal tiger	58	66	74	75
Indian Leopard	51	81	86	88
Indian elephant	1107	2214	2214	3471
Gaur	1097	1373	1373	2427
Dhole	148	181	181	N/A
Spotted deer	3333	5858	5858	8204
Sambar deer	706	1196	1196	2386
Sloth bear	51	66	66	N/A
Four-horned antelope	14	N/A	N/A	N/A
Gray langur	1468	1751	1751	1851
Wild boar	148	181	181	N/A
Indian Muntjac	72	131	131	N/A

=== Birds ===
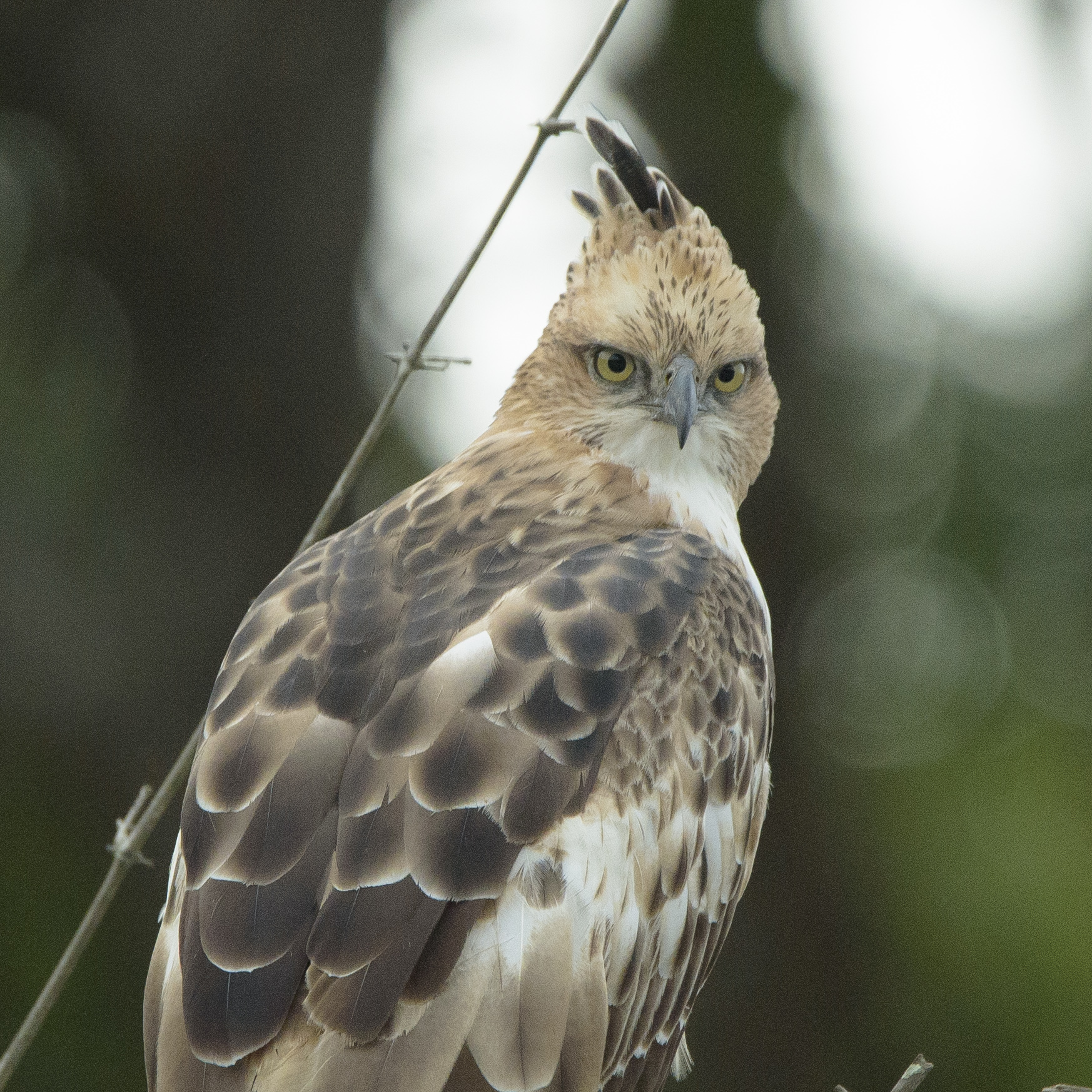
Changeable hawk-eagle

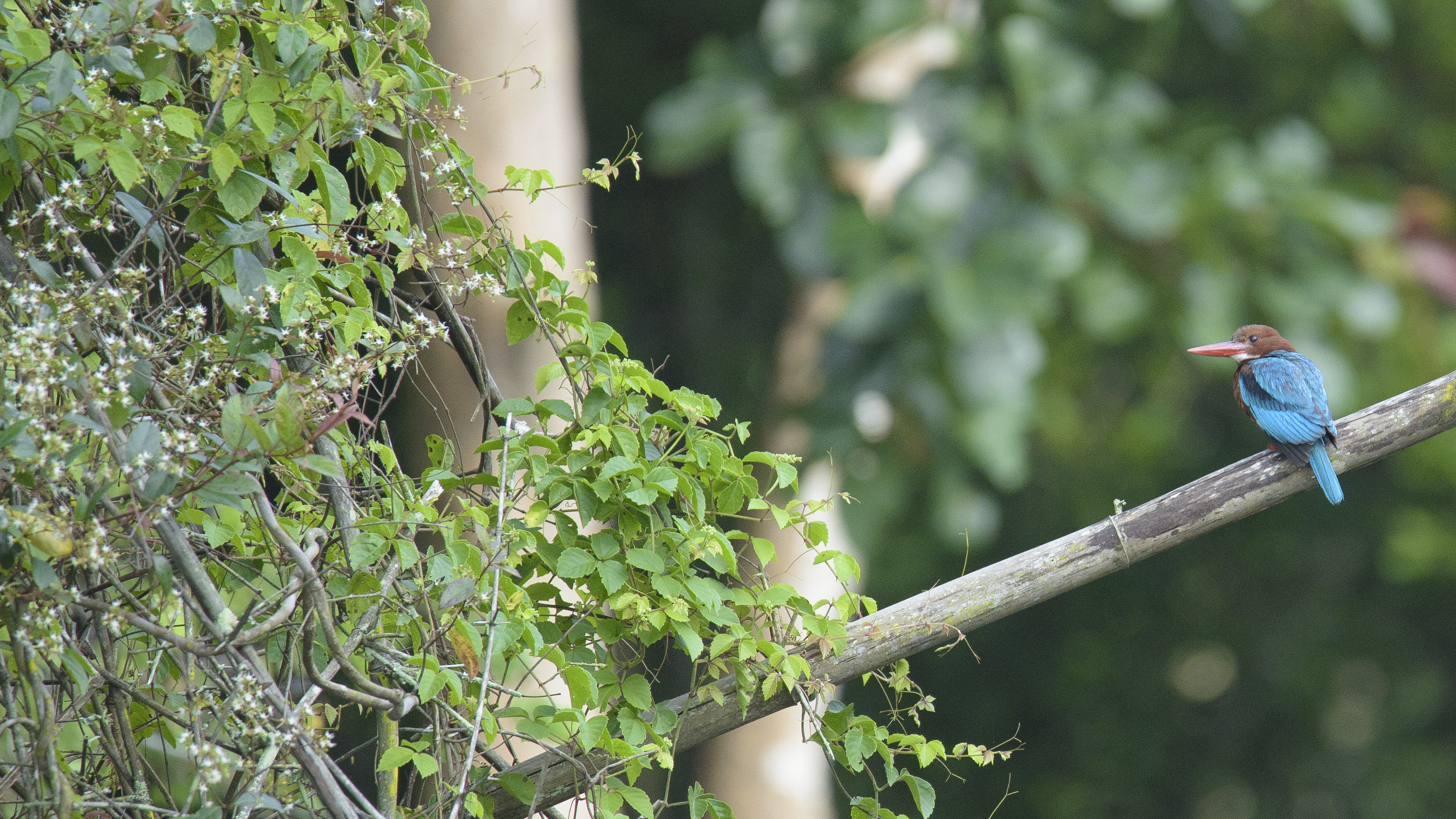
A white-throated kingfisher resting on a bamboo trunk in Bandipur National Park

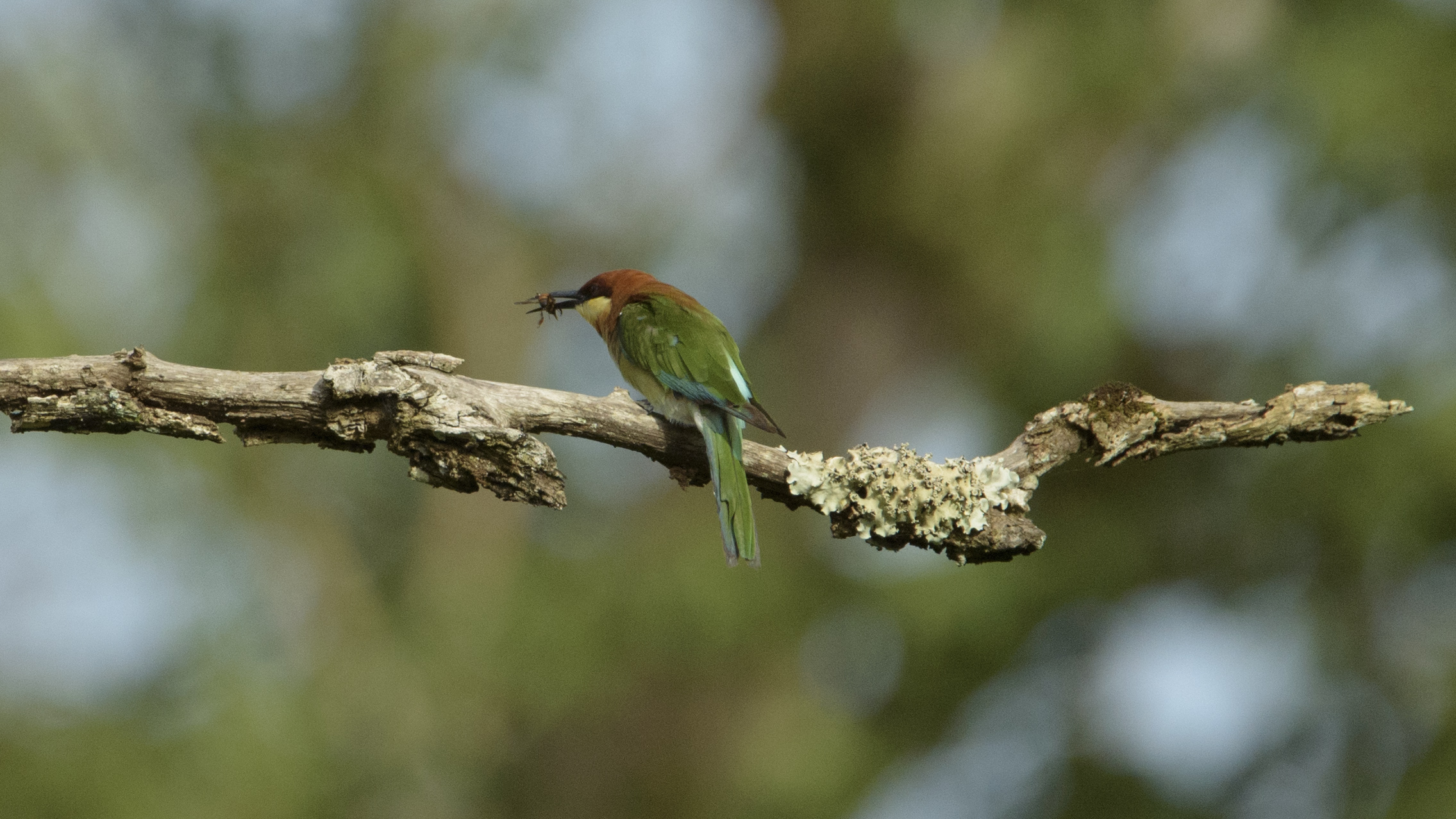
A chestnut-headed bee-eater feasting on a bee

Blue Peafowl are among the most commonly seen birds in Bandipur along with gray junglefowl, crows and drongos. Bandipur is home to over 200 species of birds including crested honey buzzard, red-headed vulture, Indian vulture, Nilgiri flowerpecker, hoopoe, Indian roller, brown fish owl, crested serpent eagle, changeable hawk-eagle, osprey, as well as many bee-eater and kingfisher species are a common sight in winter.

=== Reptiles ===
Reptile species include spectacled cobra, Indian rock python, vipers, rat snake, mugger crocodiles, monitor lizards, Indian chameleon, Indian pond terrapin, agamids and flying lizards.

=== Arthropods ===
Butterflies include common rose, crimson rose, common jay, lime butterfly, Malabar raven, common Mormon, red Helen, blue Mormon, southern birdwing, common wanderer, mottled emigrant, common grass yellow, spotless grass yellow, one spot grass yellow, Nilgiri clouded yellow, common Jezebel, Psyche, small orange tip, white orange tip, large salmon Arab, common evening brown, great evening brown, common palmfly, common bushbrown, glad eye bushbrowm, red disk bushbrown, red eye bushbrown, Lepcha bushbrown, common threering, common fivering, tawny coster, rustic, common leopard, Indian fritillary, common sailer, colour sergeant, chestnutstreaked sailer, gray count, red baron/baronet, angled castor, common castor, lemon pansy, peacock pansy, chocolate pansy, blue pansy, gray pansy, blue admiral, glassy blue tiger, dark blue tiger, plain tiger, striped/common tiger, Danaid eggfly, great eggfly, common crow, brown king crow, common Pierrot, angled Pierrot, banded blue Pierrot, striped Pierrot, dark Pierrot, red Pierrot, lime blue, zebra blue, gram blue, common cerulean, tiny grass blue, dark grass blue, Indian cupid, large four-line blue, common silverline, plum Judy, plain scupid, pea blue, metallic cerulean, chestnut Bob, dark palm dart, and brown awl.

Ant species include Anenictus sp1, Anoplolepis longipes, Camponotus parius, Crematogaster biroi, Crematogaster sp 1*, Crematogaster sp 2*, Diacamma rugosum, Lepisiota capensis, Leptogenys chinesis, Leptogenys coonorensis, Leptogenys diminuta, Lophomyrmex quadripinosus, Meranoplus bicolor, Monomorium indicum, Myrmicaria striata, Myrmicaria brunnea, Oligomyrmex wroughtonii, Pachycondyla sp1*, Paratrechina sp1*, Pheidole sharpi, Pheidole sp1*, Pheidole sp2*, Pheidologeton diverus, Polyrhachis exercita, Solenopsis geminate, Tetraponera rufonigra, and Tetraponera sp1*.

Dung beetles include Catharsius granulatus*, Copris indicus*, Oniticellus cinctus*, Onitis singhalensis*, Onthophagus beesoni*, Onthophagus ensifer*, Onthophagus rana*, Onthophagus sp.107*#, Onthophagus tarandus*, Picnopanaleus rotundus, Caccobius diminutives, Caccobius ultor, Copris furciceps, Copris sp.1#, Heliocopris dominus, Pseudonthophagus sp.2#, Sisyphus neglectus, Caccobius inermis, Caccobius meridionalis, Caccobius torticornis, Caccobius sp.1#, Copris sodalist, Onthophagus socialis, Onthophagus sp.301#, Onitis phelemon, Onthophagus furcillifer, Caccobius gallinus, Onthophagus rufulgens, Onthophagus sp.302#, Copris repertus, Pseudonthophagus sp.1#, Copris davisoni, Onitis falcatus, Onthophagus turbatus, Copris imitans, Onthophagus quadridentatus, Caccobius vulcanus, Liatongus affinis, Oniticellus spinipes, Sisyphus longipus, and Onthophagus dama.

== Conflicts and threats ==
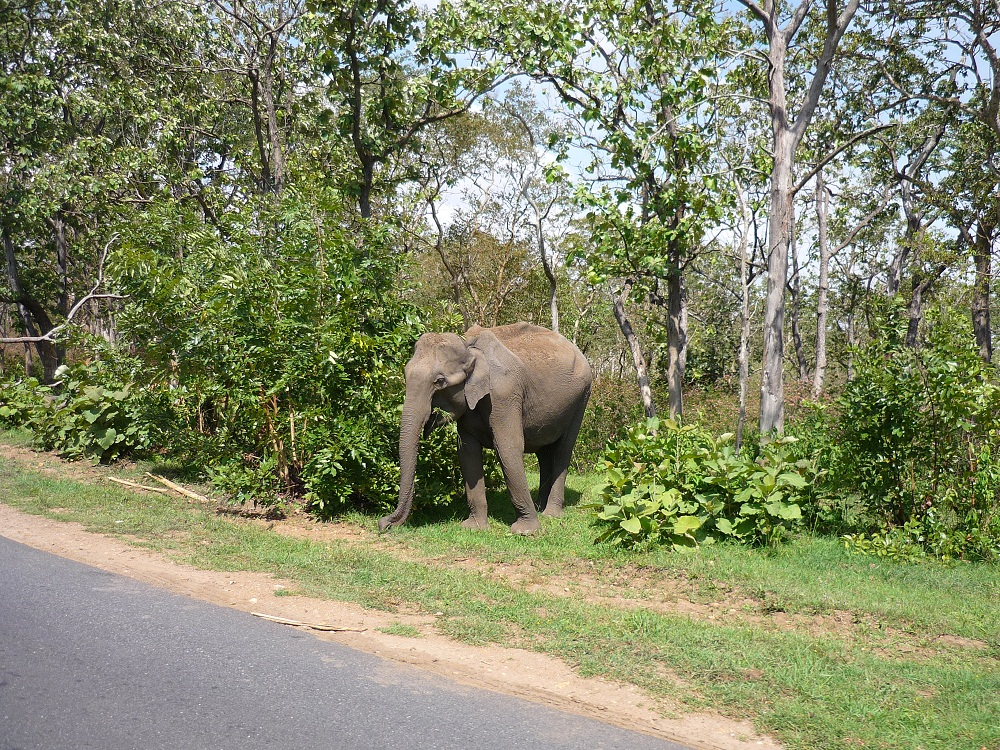
Elephant trying to cross the former NH 67

The National Highways NH-181 and NH-766 pass through Bandipur national park. This road has been a major concern as speeding vehicles have killed many wild animals in spite of frequent warnings to travelers from the forest department officials and restriction on movement of vehicles in some stretches between 9 P.M to 6 A.M. There are forest check post at both ends of the road.

On 9 October 2018, the Asian elephant named Ranga was hit by a bus one night. After this, the governments of Tamil Nadu and Karnataka agreed to ban night traffic in the forest.

== See also ==
- 2019 Bandipur forest fires
- Arid Forest Research Institute
- Indian Council of Forestry Research and Education
