= Forest range officer =

Officer of the Indian State Forest Service

Range Forest Officer / Ranger / Forest Range Officer / Circle forest officer is an officer for a State Forest Service (SFS) in the state government of India. In some states, they also are referred to as a "Forest Range Officer"

Range Forest Officer is a Gazetted officer. They wear a prescribed khaki uniform which has 3 three (five pointed) stars on shoulder without any stripes.

RFO (Range Forest Officer) is a uniformed police officer responsible for forest conservation. Their role is equivalent to that of sdm or circle officers in the administrative domain and they hold the equivalent police rank of deputy superintendent of police with three stars but no stripes. Forest Rangers are state forest officers who serve in the provincial forest forces. They can either be directly appointed to the rank of Forest Ranger or promoted from the position of Deputy Ranger. In India, these officers are recruited either through the Public Service Commission in India or the State recruitment service, depending on the specific state.

Range Forest Officers/Forest Rangers are also known as a Green Soldiers/Green Warriors.

== Accountability ==
Range Forest officers are responsible for the forests, environment and wildlife-related issues of a Forest Range within a state or union territory of India. The officer is responsible for the execution of all works in the Range, with the help of subordinates:

1. Deputy Forest Rangers (also known as Forest inspector)
2. Section Forest Officers (also known as Forester or Van Daroga)
3. Beat Forest Officers (In the rank of Forester 1)
4. Forest Guards
5. Forest workers/ watchers

== Training ==
RFOs are invariably trained in forestry and allied subjects in forest academies or forest rangers colleges established and administered by the Government of India or the State Government, as the case may be. The training course of Forest Range Officers is prescribed by the Government of India. The training duration is of 18 months which includes about 19 subjects related to forestry, Biodiversity etc. It also includes 6 months all India tour. The Directorate of Forest Education (DFE) runs 3 training institutes in Assam, Uttarakhand and Tamil Nadu for both ACF and FRO and one institution exclusively for FRO training in West Bengal. Many states also having their own institutions under the strict supervision of DFE.

== Detailed responsibilities ==
They have to undergo training in one of the Central Forest Training Academies or any of the State Forest Training Academies.

A Forest range officer is the officer in executive charge of the Range and is responsible for the efficient management of the Range, for the custody and condition of all Government Property in their charge and for the discipline, conduct and work of all subordinate staff. The officer is responsible for the execution of all works in the Range, with the help of subordinate Forest Deputy Rangers, Forest Section Officers, guards and watchers, according to the instructions and orders of the Assistant Conservator of Forests (ACF) and/or Divisional Forest Officer (DFO/DCF)

The officer is responsible for the collection and credit of Forest Revenue and for prompt and correct payment of all sums due for the works executed. The officer must carry out inspections in detail and see that all these subordinates do their work properly.

In the event serious misconduct of any subordinate, the Range Officers should report the case to Divisional Forest Officer for disciplinary action.

Range officers should maintain all accounts relating to revenue, expenditure, timber and other forest produce, and submit accounts and reports punctually to their Division Office. The officers should take effective measures to protect the forest Wealth in their custody.

Where illicit tree fellings are observed, the stumps should be examined to find out if they bear the impression of the Guard's hammer mark and if they were reported through Guard's dairy book and Preliminary Offence Report (POR).

A range officer is responsible for the protection and he or she should investigate Forest offences in the Range, and file charge sheets for the cases ordered for prosecution by Divisional Forest Officer.

A range officer is responsible for the correct posting of works Registers, ledgers Journals, Plantation registers and other stationary registers maintained in the Range. FRO should always wear the prescribed khaki uniform while on duty and should ensure that Deputy Rangers, Section Officers, guards and watchers wear their uniforms when on duty.

All correspondence connected with the works in the Range should pass through Forest Range officer or other superior. Officer may do so only through him or her.

Court summons issued to any subordinate should similarly be served through the Forest Range Officer, who has to arrange for the duties of the subordinate being carried out during his or her absence.

A Forest Ranger must be Graduate in Science (B.SC, BE, BVSC & AH), trained in forestry (two years) from the Dehradun Forest Education (DFE), Govt of India run Colleges and very specialised in soil conservation, watershed management, logging management, mountaineering, wildlife management etc., the duties and responsibilities including management of Government Forest and also:

- Protection of forest from human, natural and allied damages.
- Scientific management of forest through creation, maintenance and improvement of forests.
- To conduct silvicultural operations and collect government revenue.
- Function of sub-treasury officer in respect of all expenses amounting to lakhs in a year in forest range.
- Duties of Inspector of Police in respect to detection of crimes, arrest of offenders, investigation of offences, cases prosecuting and compounding offence cases.
- Afforestation works in raising nursery and plantation.
- Soil conservation works in the area of river valley catchment including watershed management.
- National Park/ Tiger Reserve/ Wildlife Sanctuary Management.
- Planning and executing of engineering works like road, ropeways, bridges, buildings, dams, irrigation, water supply.
- Surveying and levelling works.
- Management of offices and human resources development.
- Overall responsibility of all natural properties, works, management of range.
- Inspection and monitoring of forest check post under his/her jurisdiction.
- Public relations.
- Engaged 24 hours.
