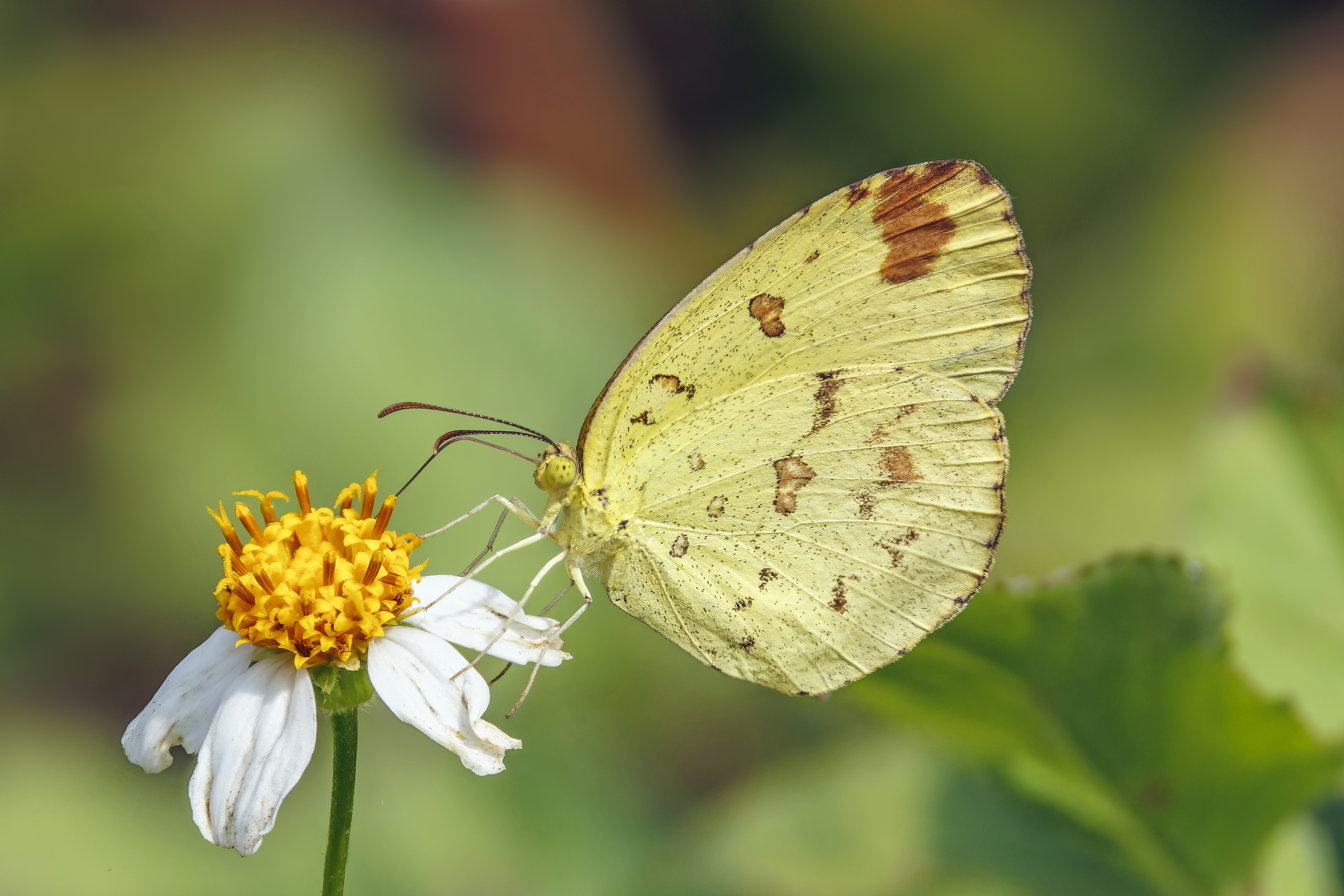
- E. h. hecabe, dry season form Laos
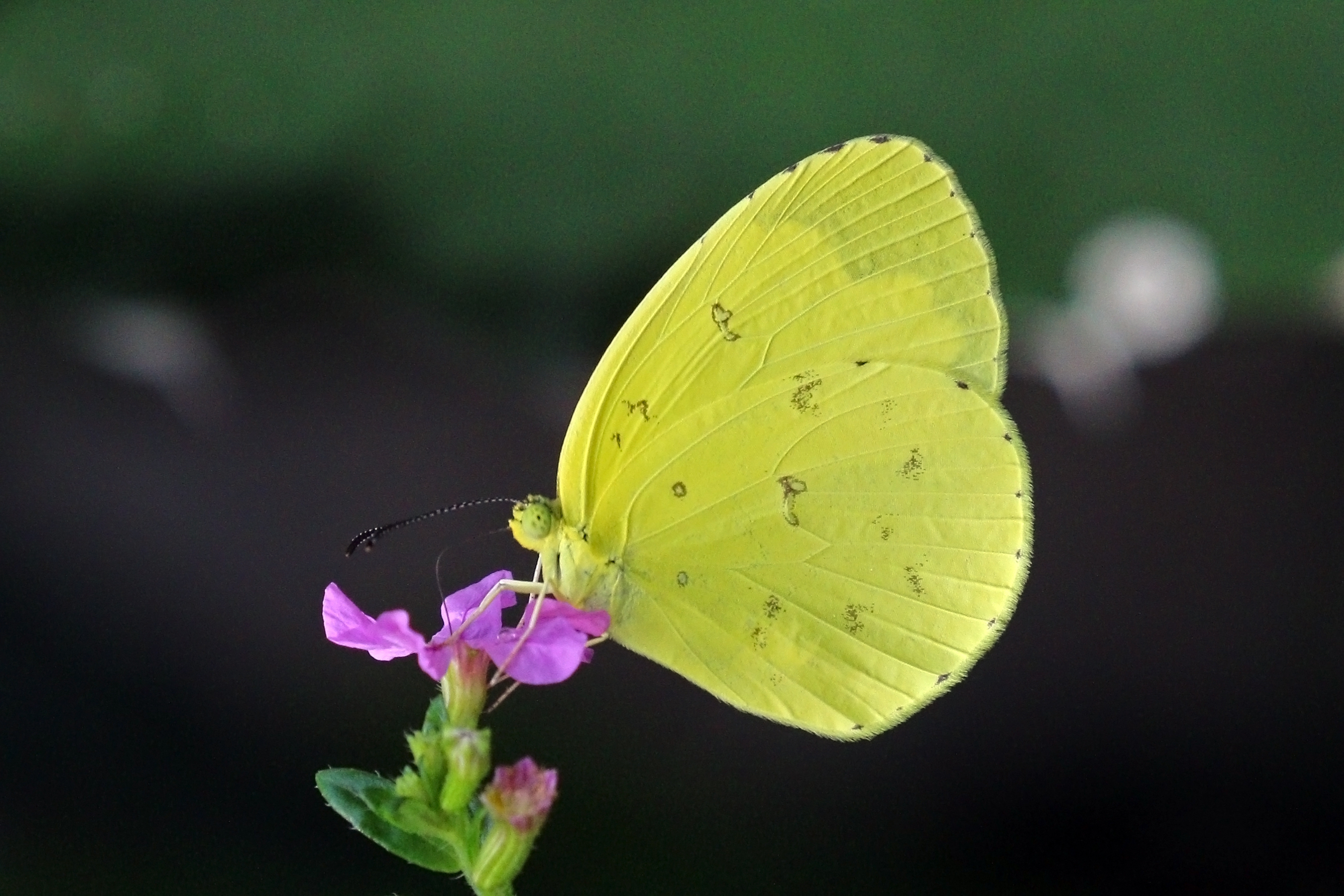
- E. h. solifera, wet season form Ghana

Scientific classification
- Kingdom: Animalia
- Phylum: Arthropoda
- Clade: Pancrustacea
- Class: Insecta
- Order: Lepidoptera
- Family: Pieridae
- Genus: Eurema
- Species: E. hecabe

Binomial name
- Eurema hecabe (Linnaeus, 1758)

Synonyms
- Papilio hecabe Linnaeus, 1758; Terias hecabe; Terias solifera Butler, 1875; Terias bisinuata Butler, 1876; Terias chalcomiaeta Butler, 1879; Terias dentilimbata Butler, 1879; Terias bewsheri Butler, 1879; Terias orientis Butler, 1888; Terias aethiopica Trimen & Bowker, 1889; Terias butleri Trimen & Bowker, 1889; Terias floricola f. parva Rothschild, 1921; Terias brenda ab. alba Dufrane, 1945; Terias brenda ab. subalba Dufrane, 1945; Terias floricola ab. alba Dufrane, 1945; Terias brenda ab. maureli Dufrane, 1947; Terias hecabe senegalensis f. continua Storace, 1949; Terias hecabe f. napia Stoneham, 1957; Terias hecabe f. neria Stoneham, 1957; Terias maroensis Butler, 1883; Terias biformis Butler, 1884; Terias latilimbata Butler, 1886; Terias hecabe borneensis Fruhstorfer, 1910; Terias amplexa Butler, 1887; Terias mandarina de l'Orza, 1869; Terias photophila Butler, 1884; Terias diversa Wallace, 1867; Terias hecabe oeta Fruhstorfer, 1910; Terias phoebus Butler, 1886; Eurema hecabe var. kerawara Ribbe, 1898; Eurema hecabe var. magna Ribbe, 1898; Terias contubernalis Moore, 1886

= Eurema hecabe =

Species of butterfly

Eurema hecabe, the common grass yellow, is a small pierid butterfly species found in Asia, Africa and Australia. They are found flying close to the ground and are found in open grass and scrub habitats. It is simply known as "the grass yellow" in parts of its range; the general term otherwise refers to the entire genus Eurema.

== Description ==
The common grass yellow exhibits seasonal polyphenism. The lepidopteran has a darker summer morph, triggered by a long day exceeding 13 hours in duration, while the shorter diurnal period of 12 hours or less induces a fairer morph in the post-monsoon period.

Torben Larsen developed a species numbering system for his 2005 publication Butterflies of West Africa. The subspecies solifera is #39. The 'Larsen' numbers have since been used with permission in A Sharp Eye on Butterflies of Ghana.

=== Male ===
Upperside (dorsal surface): yellow, variable in tint from sulphur to rich lemon yellow according to season and locality. Forewing: apex and termen deep black, this colour continued narrowly along the costal margin to base of wing, near which it often becomes diffuse; the inner margin of the black area from costa to vein 4 very oblique and irregular, between veins 2 and 4 excavate on the inner side, this excavation outwardly rounded between the veins and inwardly toothed on vein 3; below vein 2 the black area is suddenly dilated into a square spot which occupies the whole of the tornal angle; the inner margin of this dilatation is variable, in the typical form slightly concave. Hindwing: terminal margin with a narrow black band which is attenuated anteriorly and posteriorly; dorsal margin broadly paler than the ground colour.

The region of dorsal surface that appears visibly yellow to humans also reflects brightly in the ultraviolet (320-400 nm) owing to the presence of multilayer cuticular nanostructures.

Underside (ventral surface): yellow, generally a slightly paler shade than that of the upperside, with the following reddish-brown markings. Forewing: two small spots or specks in basal half of cell and a reniform (kidney-shaped) spot or ring on the discocellulars. Hindwing: a slightly curved subbasal series of three small spots, an irregular slender ring or spot on the discocellulars, followed by a highly irregular, curved, transverse, discal series of spots or specks, some or all of which are often obsolescent. On both the forewings and hindwings, the veins that attain the costal and terminal margins end in minute reddish-brown specks. Antenna are greyish yellow, the club black; head, thorax and abdomen are yellow, shaded with fuscous scales; beneath: the palpi, thorax and abdomen are yellowish white. The sex-mark seen from above appears as a thickening of the basal half of the median vein on the forewing.

=== Female ===
Upperside: Very similar to that of the male but without the sex-mark; the black areas on both forewings and hindwings slightly broader, with the inner edge of the black terminal band on the hindwing often diffuse.

Females also have a reduced patch of ultraviolet-reflecting scales located in the proximate region of the dorsal forewing. The mechanism responsible for this colouration is the same as in males but the reflectance is less bright.

Underside: ground colour and markings as in the male. Antennae, head, thorax and abdomen similarly coloured.

=== Dry-season form ===
Upperside: ground colour and markings much as in wet-season specimens, the emargination on the inner side of the black area and the tornal dilatation on the forewing similar. On the hindwing, in the great majority of individuals, the black terminal band is also similar; in a few it is narrower and diffuse inwardly in both sexes.

Underside: ground colour similar to that in wet-season specimens, but very many have a greater or less irroration of black scales over the yellow parts of the wing; the reddish-brown markings on both forewings and hindwings are also similar, but the spots are larger, more clearly defined, darker, and therefore far more conspicuous. In addition, on the forewing there is a preapical, very prominent, transverse, elongate spot or short bar or reddish brown extended downwards from the costa. This spot is irregular in shape and of variable width, but does not seem to ever spread outwards to the actual edge of the termen. In a few specimens there is also a small reddish-brown spot in interspace near the tornus. Antennae, head, thorax and abdomen, and in the male, the sex-mark, as in wet-season specimens.

== Life cycle ==
Eggs are laid on Abrus precatorius, Falcataria moluccana, Acacia sp., Aeschynomene species and numerous other Leguminosae, Euphorbiaceae and Cucurbitaceae sp..

Studies suggest that the females can discriminate colours when choosing host plants for oviposition.

Larva: "Long, green, rough, cylindrical, or slightly depressed, with a large head."

Pupa: "Suspended by the tail and by a moderately long band; the abdominal segments are round, but the thorax is much compressed, the wing-cases uniting to form a deep sharp keel. The head-case terminates in a short pointed snout. Ordinarily the pupa is solitary and green, but sometimes on a twig in large numbers. Many Pierine and other larvae seek each others company at that time. Having selected a dead branch of some neighbouring bush, they acquired the colour of their surroundings as nearly all Pierine and Papilionine pupae do to a greater or less extent."

This species has been found to be parasitised by multiple strains of Wolbachia. These bacteria can alter the sex ratios of the species.

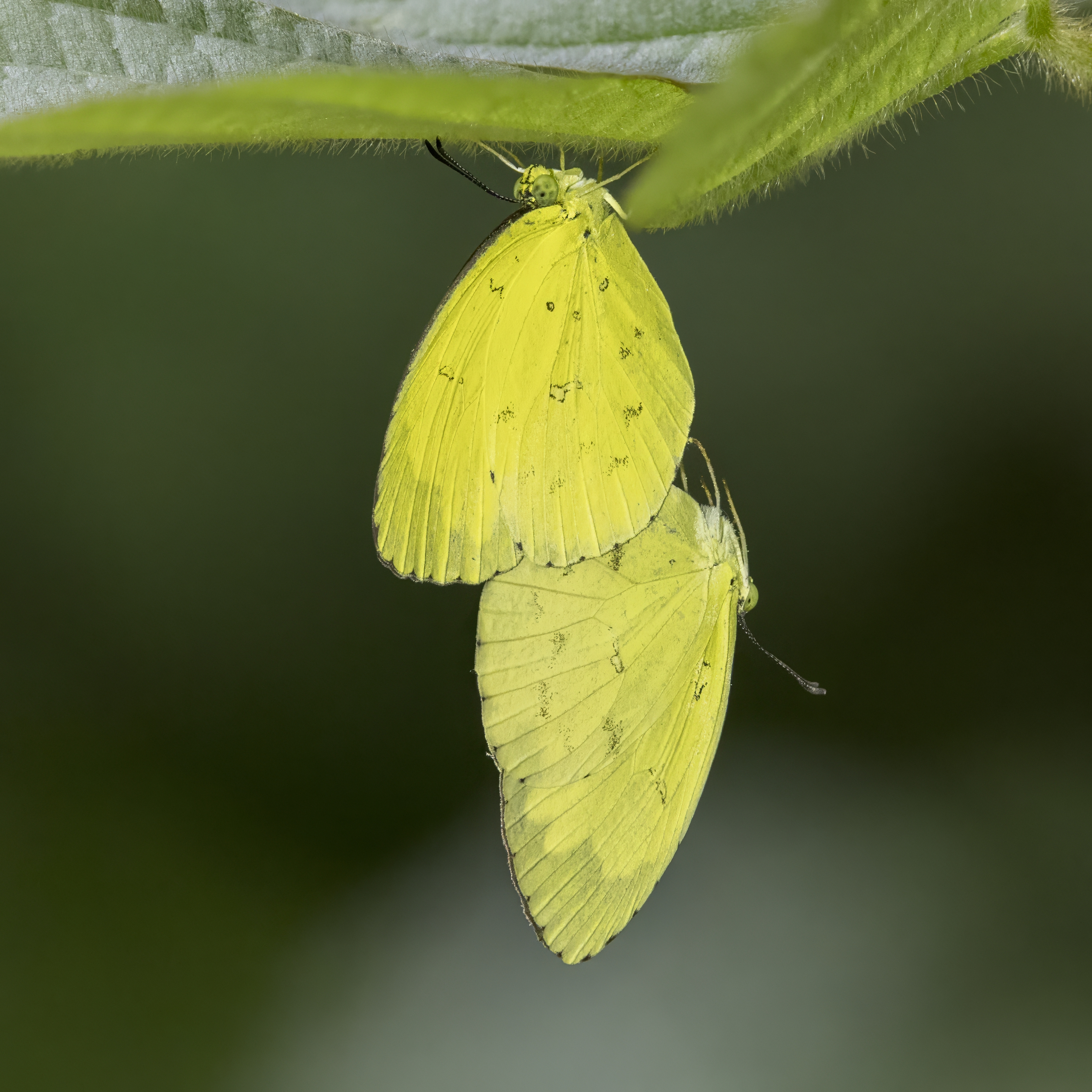
E. h. solifera mating

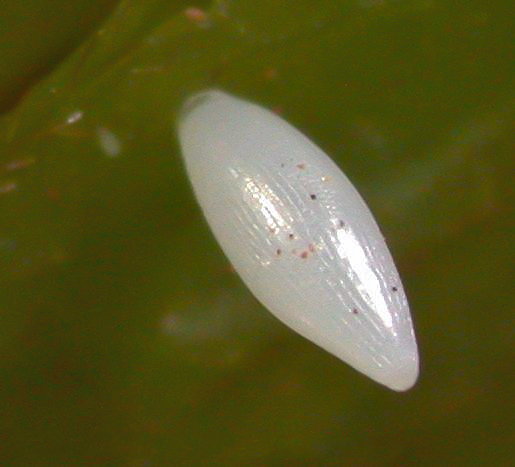
Egg

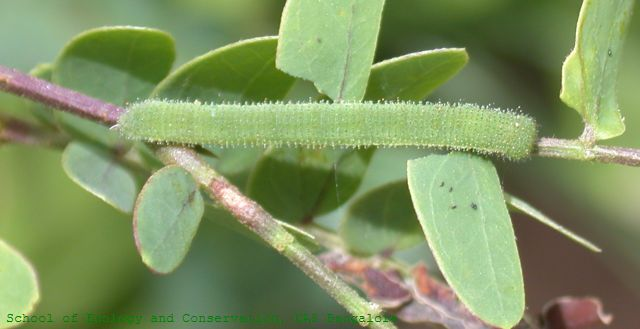
Larva (caterpillar)

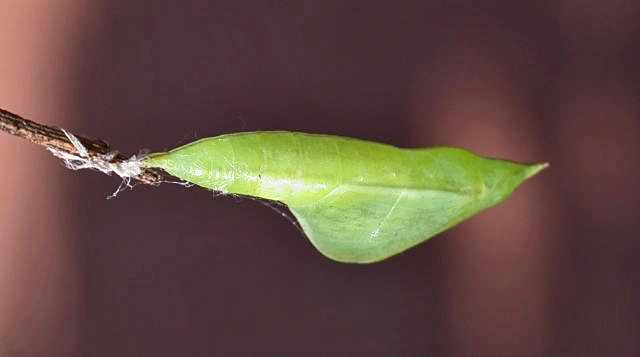
Pupa

== Subspecies ==
This is a partial list.

- E. h. albina Huang, 1994 (Fujian)
- E. h. amplexa (Butler, 1887) (Christmas Island)
- E. h. biformis (Butler, 1884) (Ambon, Serang)
- E. h. brevicostalis Butler, 1898 (Timor to Kai Island)
- E. h. contubernalis (South, Southeast, and East Asia)
- E. h. diversa (Wallace, 1867) (Buru)
- E. h. hecabe (Indo-China)
- E. h. hobsoni (Butler, 1880) (Taiwan)
- E. h. kerawara Ribbe, 1898 (Bismarck Archipelago)
- E. h. latilimbata (Butler, 1886) (Sumatra, Borneo)
- E. h. latimargo Hopffer, 1874 (Celebes)
- E. h. mandarina (de l'Orza, 1869) (Japan)
- E. h. maroensis (Butler, 1883) (Maroe Island)
- E. h. nivaria Fruhstorfer, 1910 (Solomons)
- E. h. oeta (Fruhstorfer, 1910) (West Irian to Papua)
- E. h. phoebus (Butler, 1886) (Northern Australia)
- E. h. solifera (Butler, 1875) (Africa)

== Gallery ==
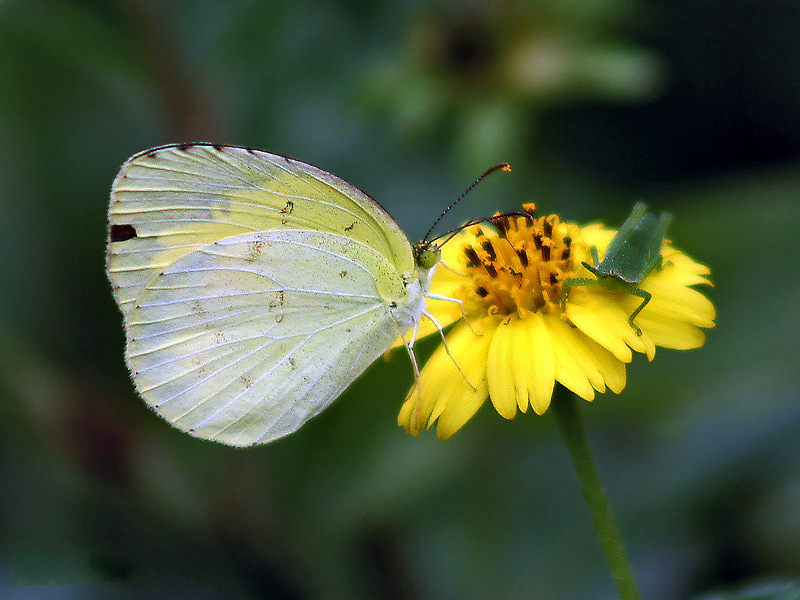
Wet-season form

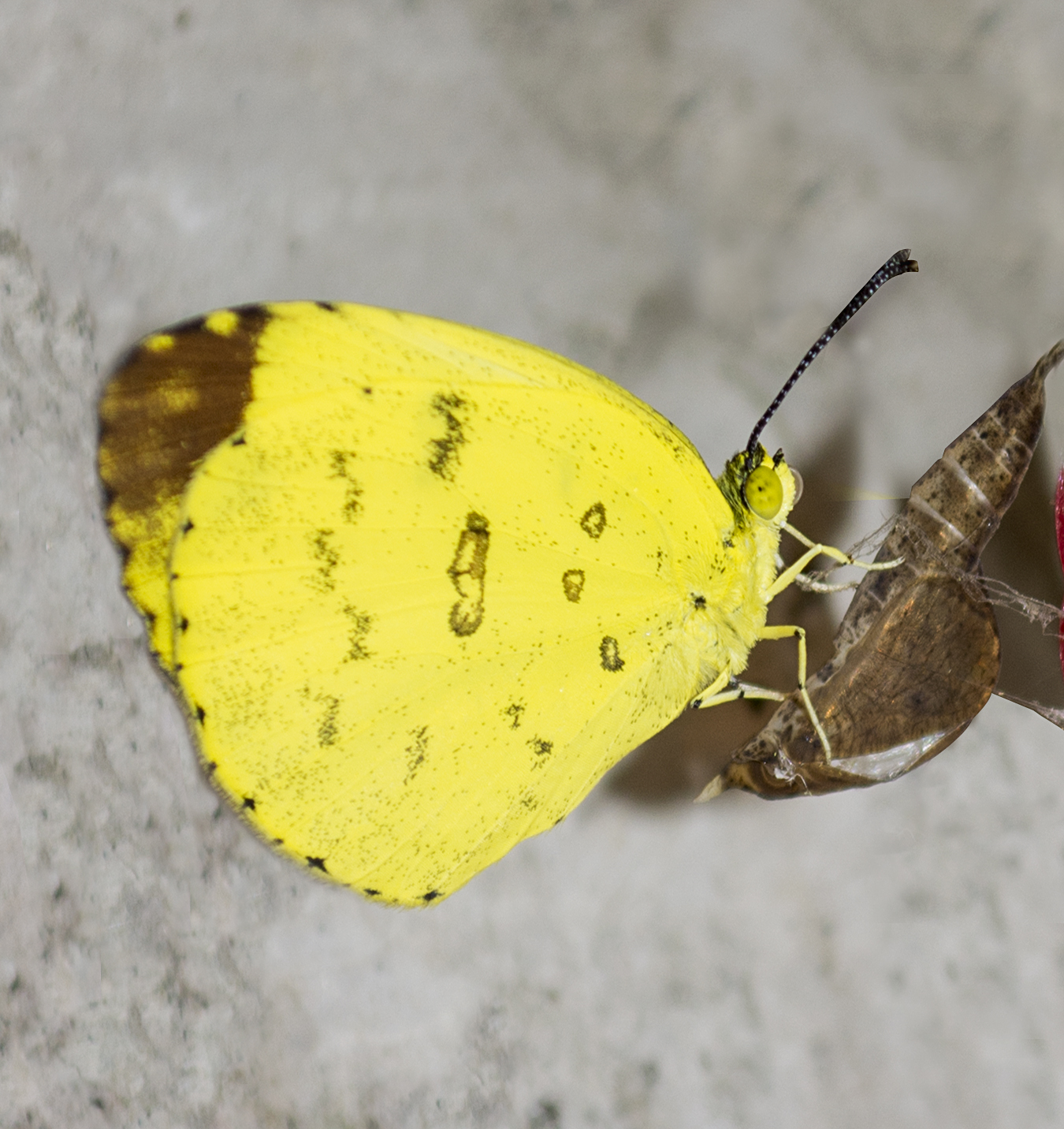
Newly emerged

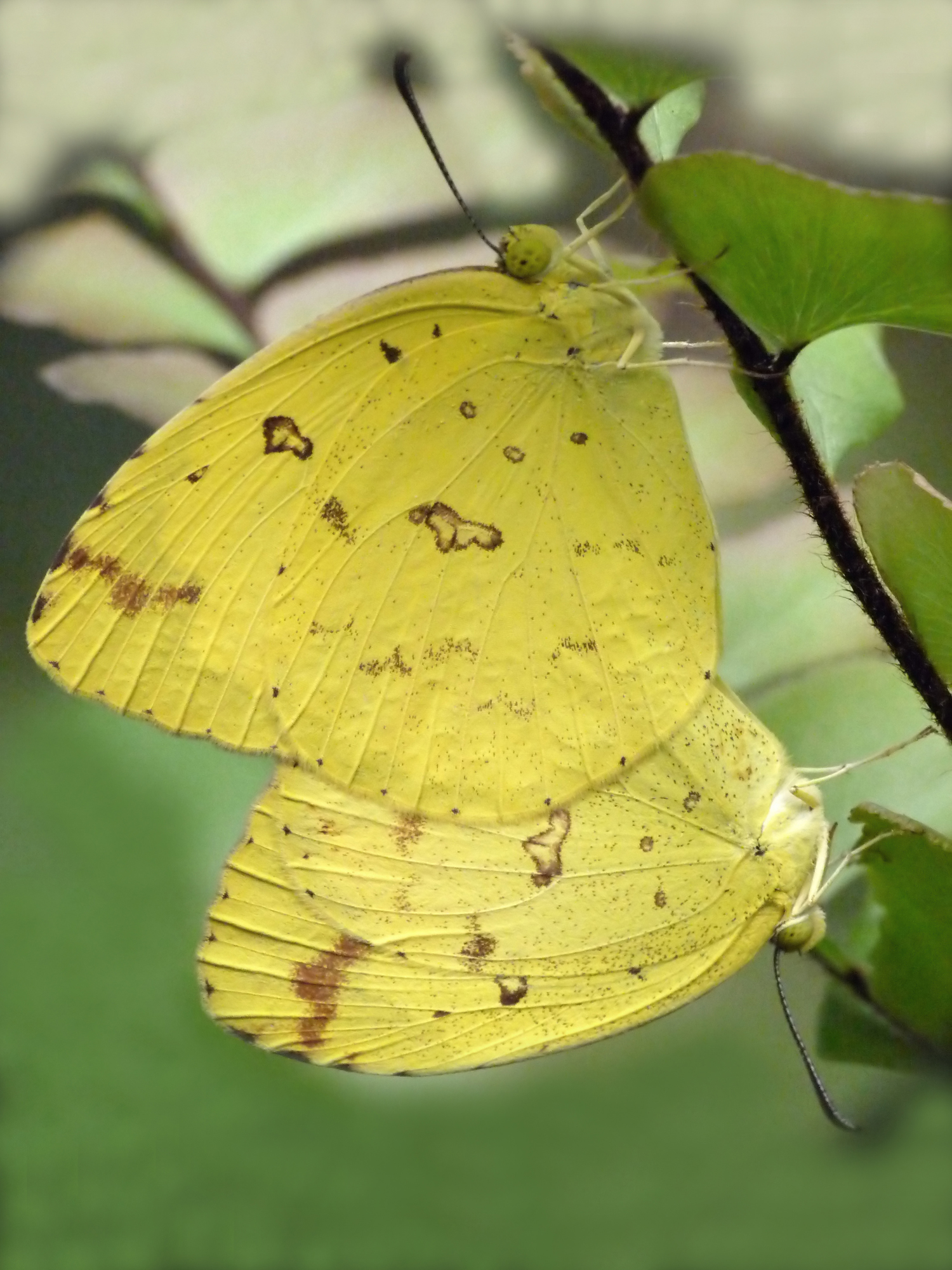
Mating pair

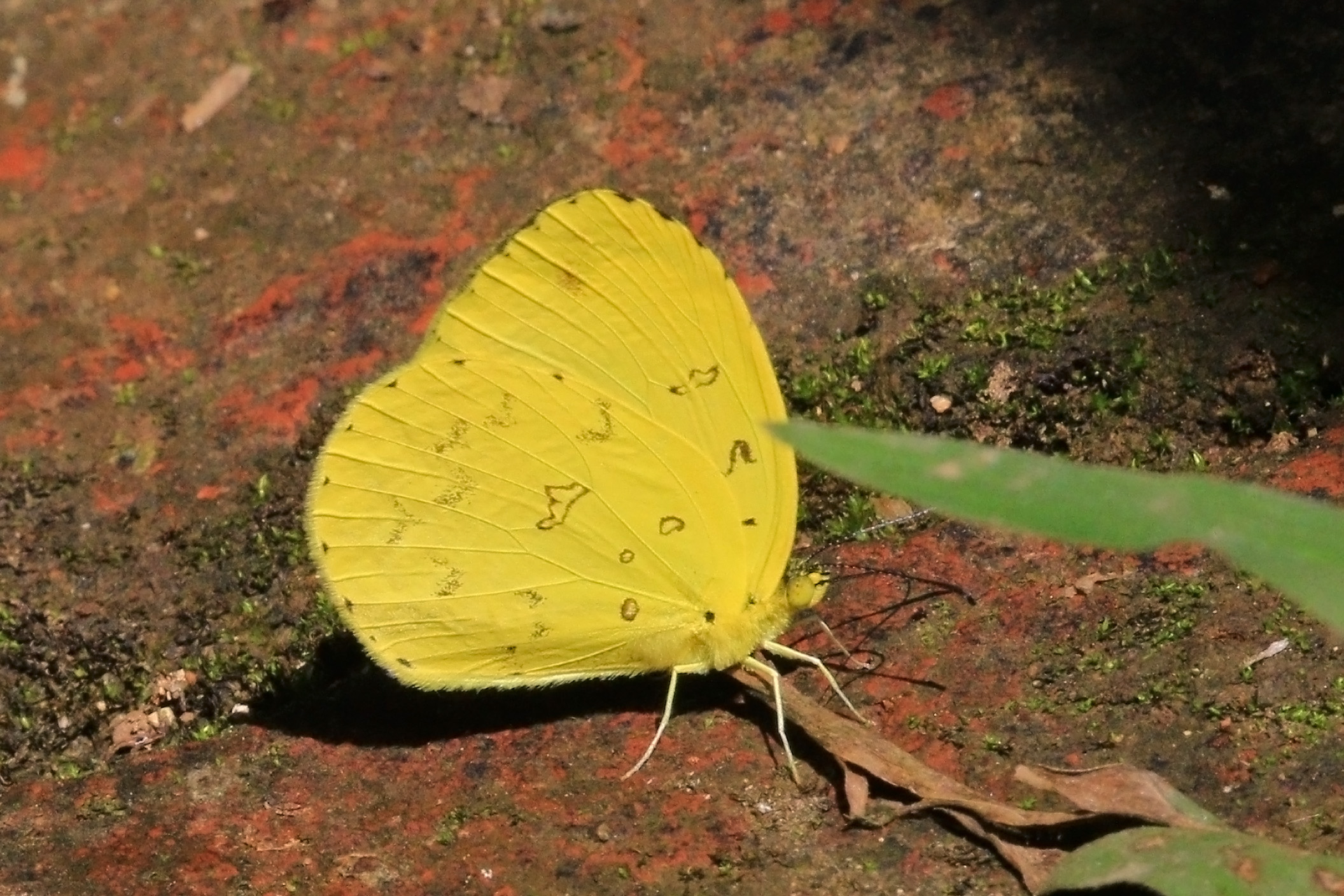
E. h. solifera, Uganda

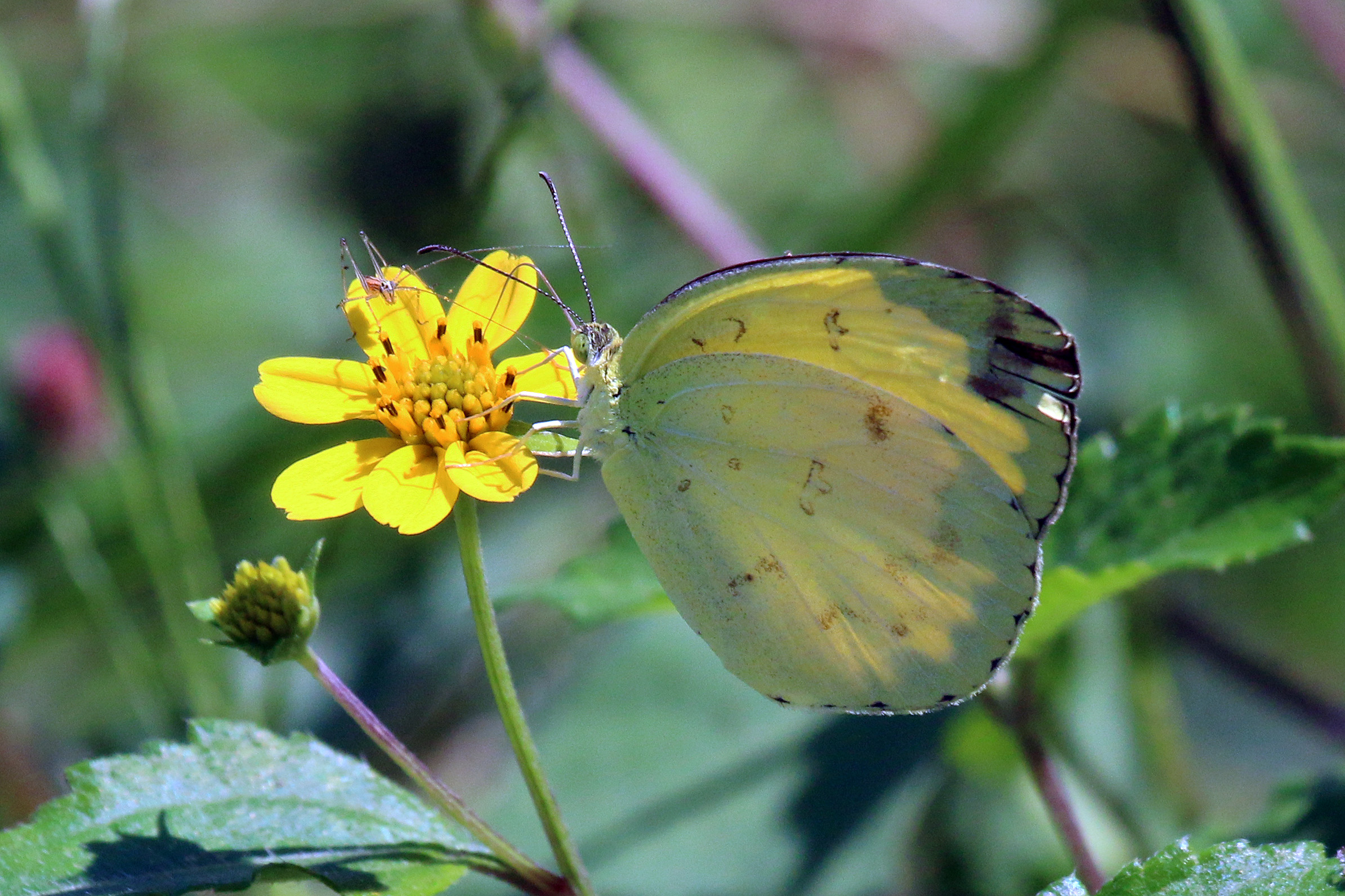
E. h. stankapura, Bali

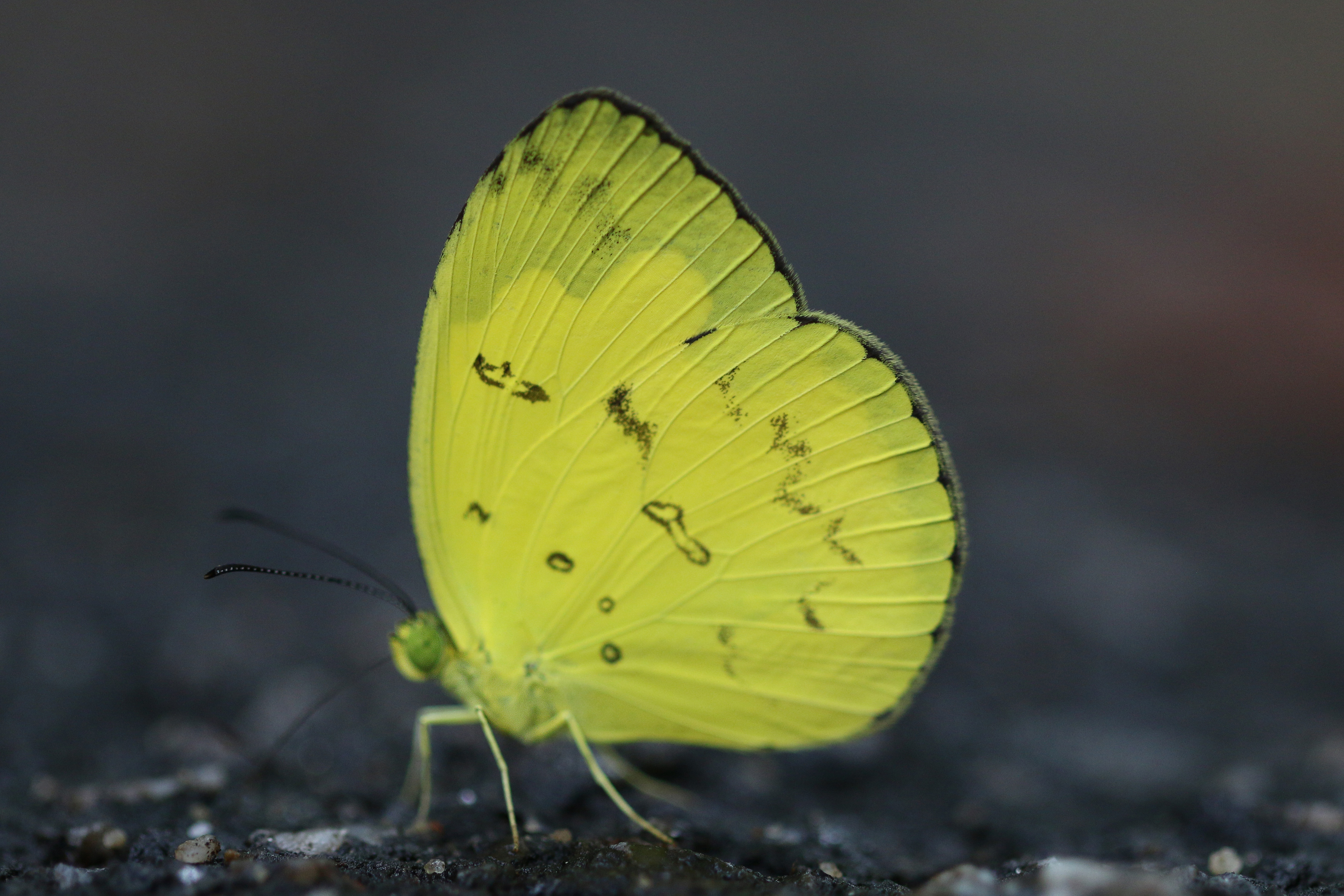
E. h. contubernalis, wet season form Singapore

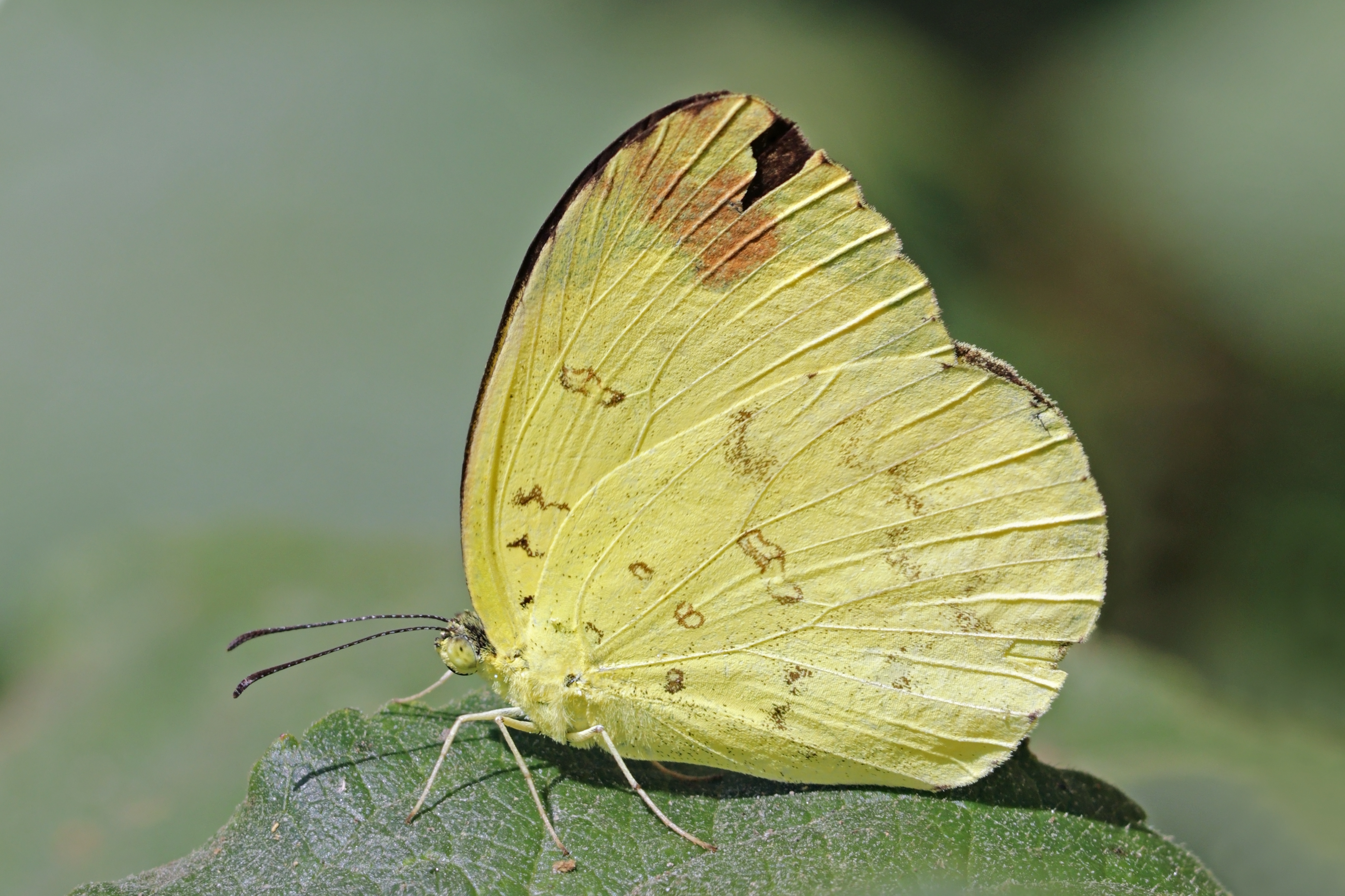
E. h. contubernalis, dry season form Nepal

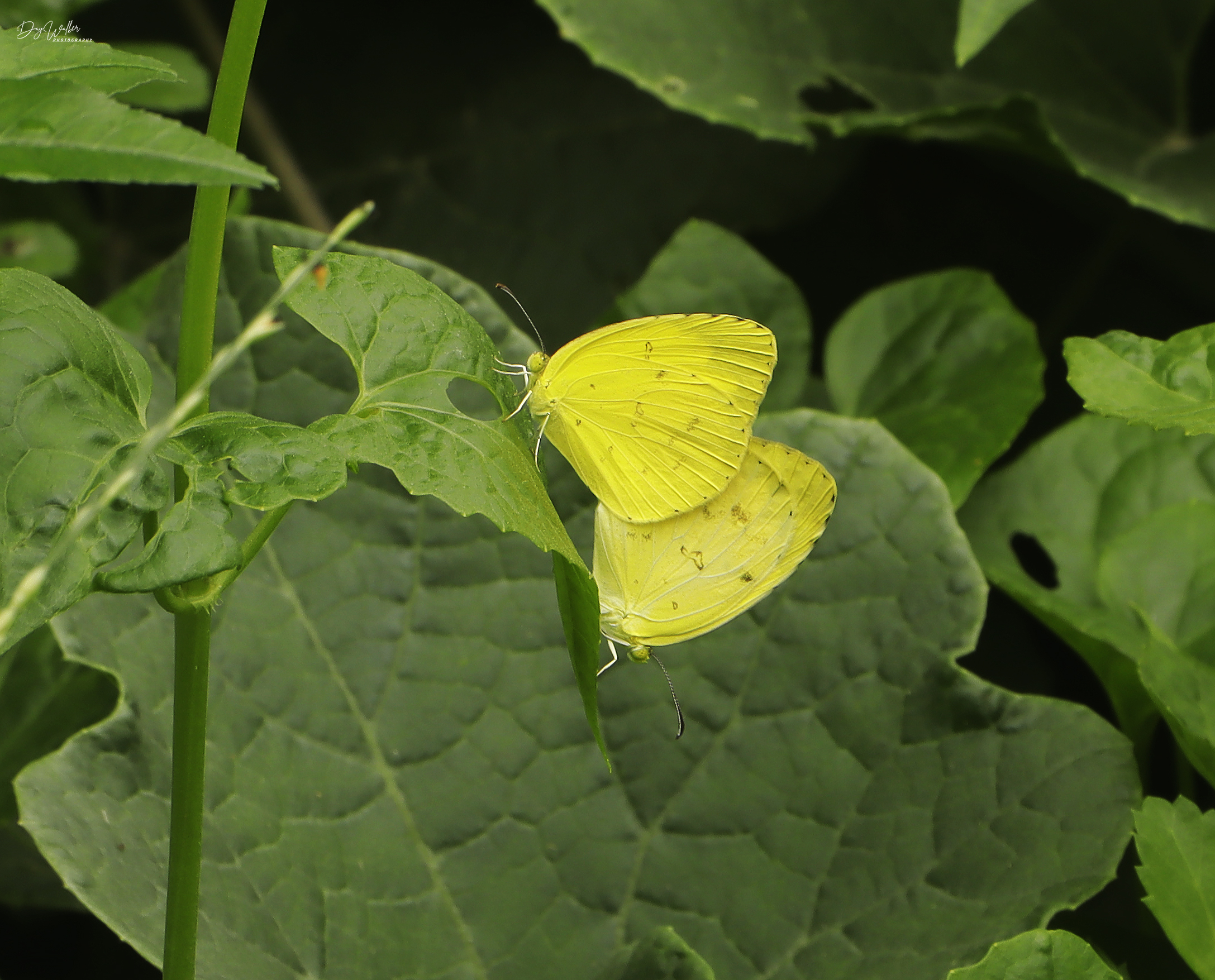
in Nepal
