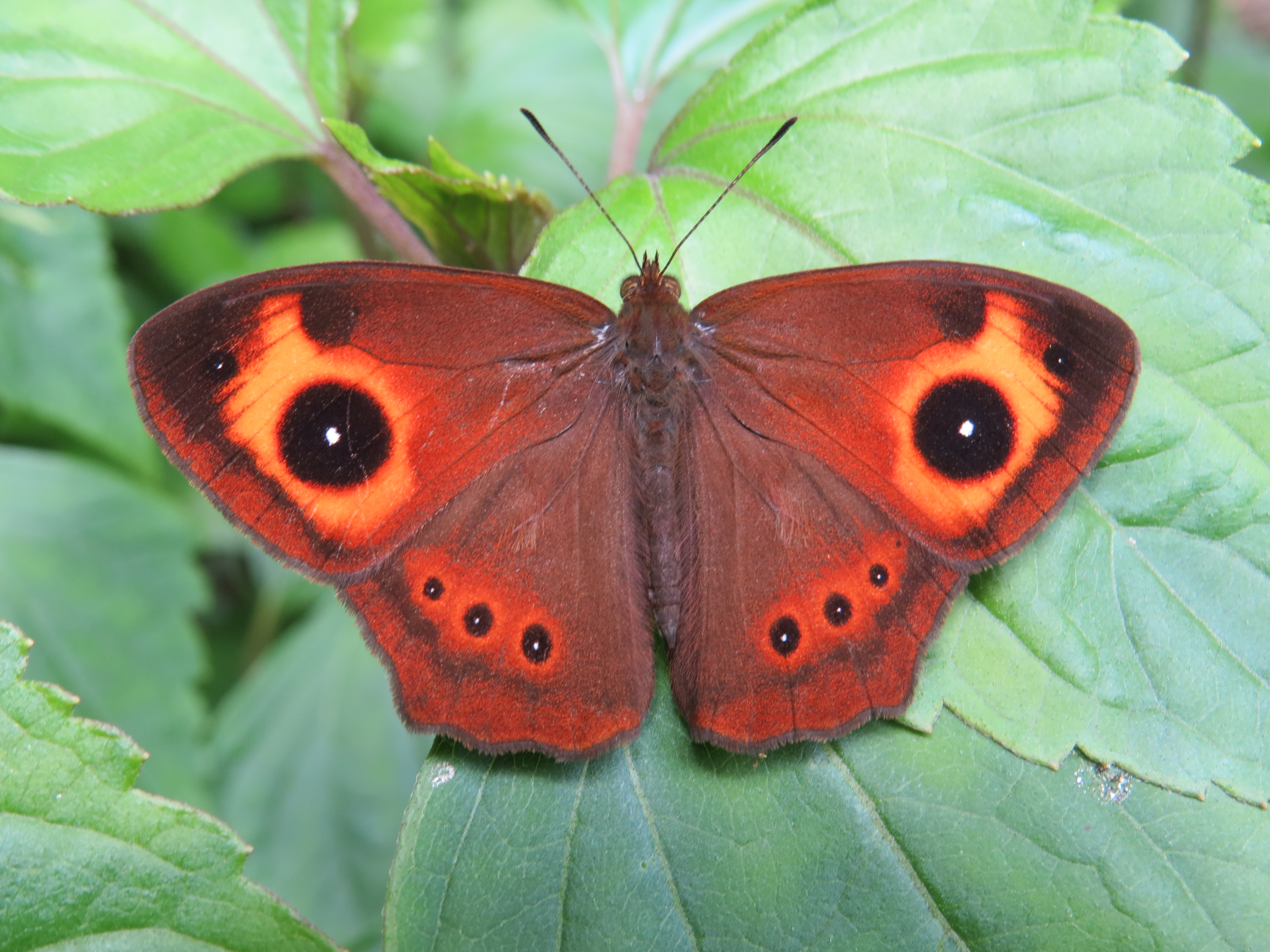

Scientific classification
- Kingdom: Animalia
- Phylum: Arthropoda
- Clade: Pancrustacea
- Class: Insecta
- Order: Lepidoptera
- Family: Nymphalidae
- Genus: Telinga
- Species: T. oculus

Binomial name
- Telinga oculus (Marshall, 1880)
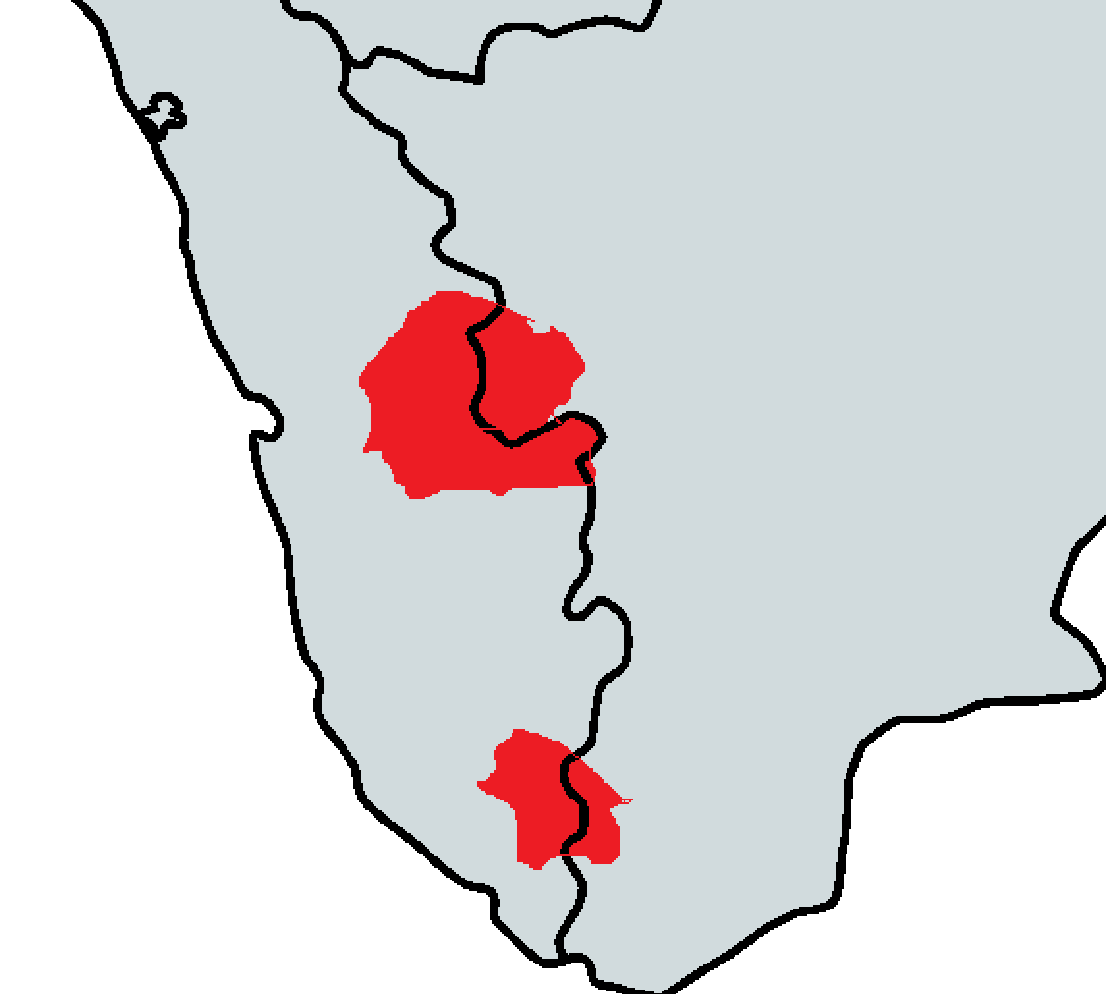

Synonyms
- Heteropsis oculus (Marshall, 1880); Mycalesis oculus

= Telinga oculus =

Red-disc bushbrown

Species of butterfly

Telinga oculus, the red-disc bushbrown, is a satyrine butterfly found in southern India. It is similar in markings to Telinga adolphei but distinguished by the reddish band around the large apical spots on the upper forewings.

== Description ==
Somewhat similar to Telinga adolphei but the eyespots on the median vein of the upper forewing much larger and encircled by a broad ring of orange red and extending towards the costal margin (leading edge). The underside is dark reddish brown. The eyespot on the hindwing is larger than in T. adolphei. The wingspan is about 5 to 6 cm. The species is found mainly in the hill forests of the southern Western Ghats.

Frederic Moore described the imago as follows:

Male. Upperside rich ferruginous-brown. Forewing darker brown externally; with an indistinct small subapical black spot with white pupil; a very large prominent lower black ocellus, with large white pupil, broadly surrounded externally with bright ferruginous-red, which latter colour forms an irregular discal patch extending from the posterior margin and is anteriorly prolonged in front of the subapical spot to near the costa. Hindwing with four anteriorly decreasing moderately small black ocelli with white pupils and darker ferruginous-red outer rings. Cilia dark cinereous. Underside paler ferruginous-brown, more ochraceous brown externally. Both wings with the basal area marked with short dark ferruginous-brown strigae, and with a distinct darker brown transverse discal line, which is widely ochreous bordered externally at its costal end on the forewing, and narrowly with cinereous posteriorly on both wings. Forewing with a minute subapical and a small lower median ocellus, and sometimes a white dot is also present between the upper and middle median veins. Hindwing with six very small ocelli, the four upper and the lowest being minute.

Male with a subbasal tuft of brown hairs overlapping a small glandular patch of blach scales on the upperside of hindwing, and on the underside of the forewing with a large basal nacreous area with a very slight ordinary glandular patch of blackish scales.

Female larger. Upperside of somewhat brighter colours; all the ocelli larger and more prominent. Underside paler than in the male, the transverse discal line on both wings broadly diffused externally with paler ochreous anteriorly and cinereous posteriorly; ocelli the same as in male.

Body above dark brown; abdomen beneath, legs, and streaks on sides of palpi pale ochreous-brown.

— Frederic Moore, Lepidoptera Indica. Vol. I
