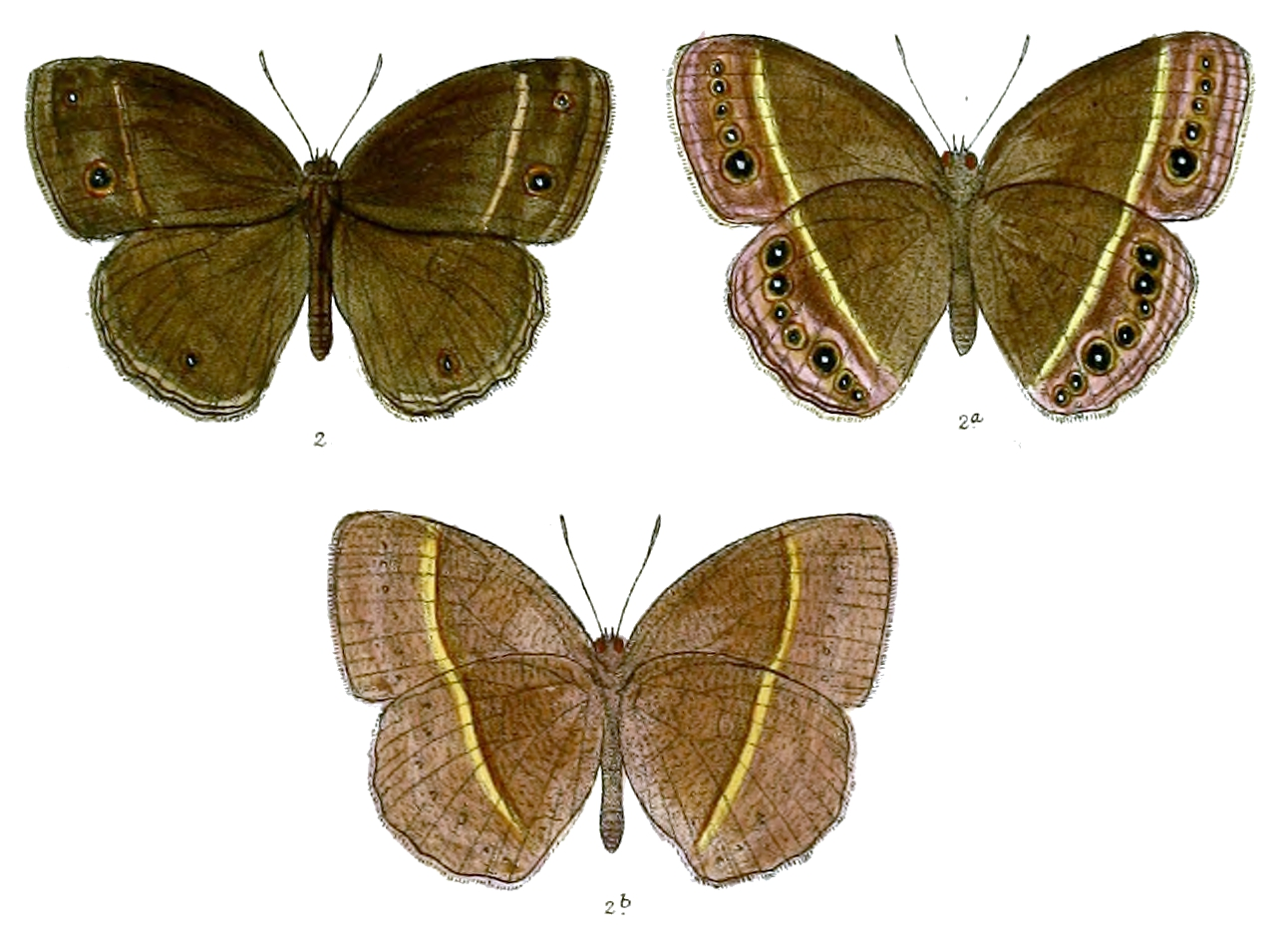

Scientific classification
- Kingdom: Animalia
- Phylum: Arthropoda
- Clade: Pancrustacea
- Class: Insecta
- Order: Lepidoptera
- Family: Nymphalidae
- Genus: Telinga
- Species: T. lepcha

Binomial name
- Telinga lepcha (Moore, 1880)

Synonyms
- Mycalesis annamitica lepcha (but see text) (Moore, 1880); Mycalesis watsoni Evans, 1912; Mycalesis lepcha

= Telinga lepcha =

Lepcha bushbrown

Species of butterfly

Telinga lepcha, the Lepcha bushbrown, is a satyrine butterfly found in Asia. It is not resolved whether it is best considered a distinct species, or included in Mycalesis annamitica. It was formerly included in Telinga malsara.

== Description ==
Wet-season form. Upperside very dark Vandyke brown; cilia whitish brown; the discal transverse white bar on the underside of the wings showing through very clearly, more distinctly on the forewing than on the hindwing; followed on both wings by two or three dark pale-ringed, generally non-pupilled ocelli, and subterminal and terminal pale slender lines. Underside: ground colour darker, the discal white bar and terminal slender line as on the upperside, but the former clear and well-defined inwardly, diffuse outwardly; forewing with four, hindwing with seven white-centred, fulvous-ringed, black ocelli; the rows of ocelli bordered on both sides by narrow crescentic pale purpurescent (purplish) marks forming somewhat irregular lines; subterminal line similar, lunular. Antennae, head, thorax and abdomen brown; club of the antennae ochraceous, marked with black on the inner side. Male sex-mark in form 2.

Dry-season form. Upperside similar but paler; the ocelli, especially on the hindwing, obscure or absent; the transverse white discal band on the wings seen by transmission from the underside narrow and very obscure. Underside: basal areas of wings up to the discal white band dark brown in the male, ochraceous brown in the female; the discal white band very narrow and ochraceous white; the terminal margins beyond purpurescent; ocelli minute; both forewings and hindwings irrorated with short, transverse, brown striae.

Race lepcha, Moore.—♂ ♀. The North-West Himalayan and Southern Indian race of T. malsara, closely resembling it in both the wet- and dry-season forms. It differs in having the transverse discal band crossing both wings very much narrower and not showing through at all on the upperside; the ocelli are very much smaller and more obsolescent. Underside in the dry-season form irrorated as in T. malsara with short, transverse, dark brown striae.
