= Forest check post =

A forest check post is a check point set up by the Forest department of the state governments or Government of India. Forest check posts are created to monitor, control or stop the movement of humans or vehicles and to keep check on unlawful activities inside the notified forest. They are set up to prevent and detect poaching of wild animals, felling of trees in forest, smuggling of wood and other activities which are harmful to living organisms and other illegal activities in the forest.

A forest check post is basically a shelter for personnel from the Forest department to do assigned duties and is generally provided with barricades to stop movement of humans and vehicles. A forest check post may be a permanent structure made up of brick and mortar or a thatched roof hut. Facilities available at forest check posts may be rudimentary or equipped. A well equipped check post may have a concrete structure with toilet, dormitory, electricity, wireless set or telephone, tap water and others. In India generally forest check posts are found on entry and exit of roads which go within a forest area. Sometimes it set up at places where general public movement is not allowed, like to stop villagers entering into forest (jungle) for grazing their cattle or to collect firewood or forest produce. Some forest check posts are assigned to collect fees for entering into designated forest.
