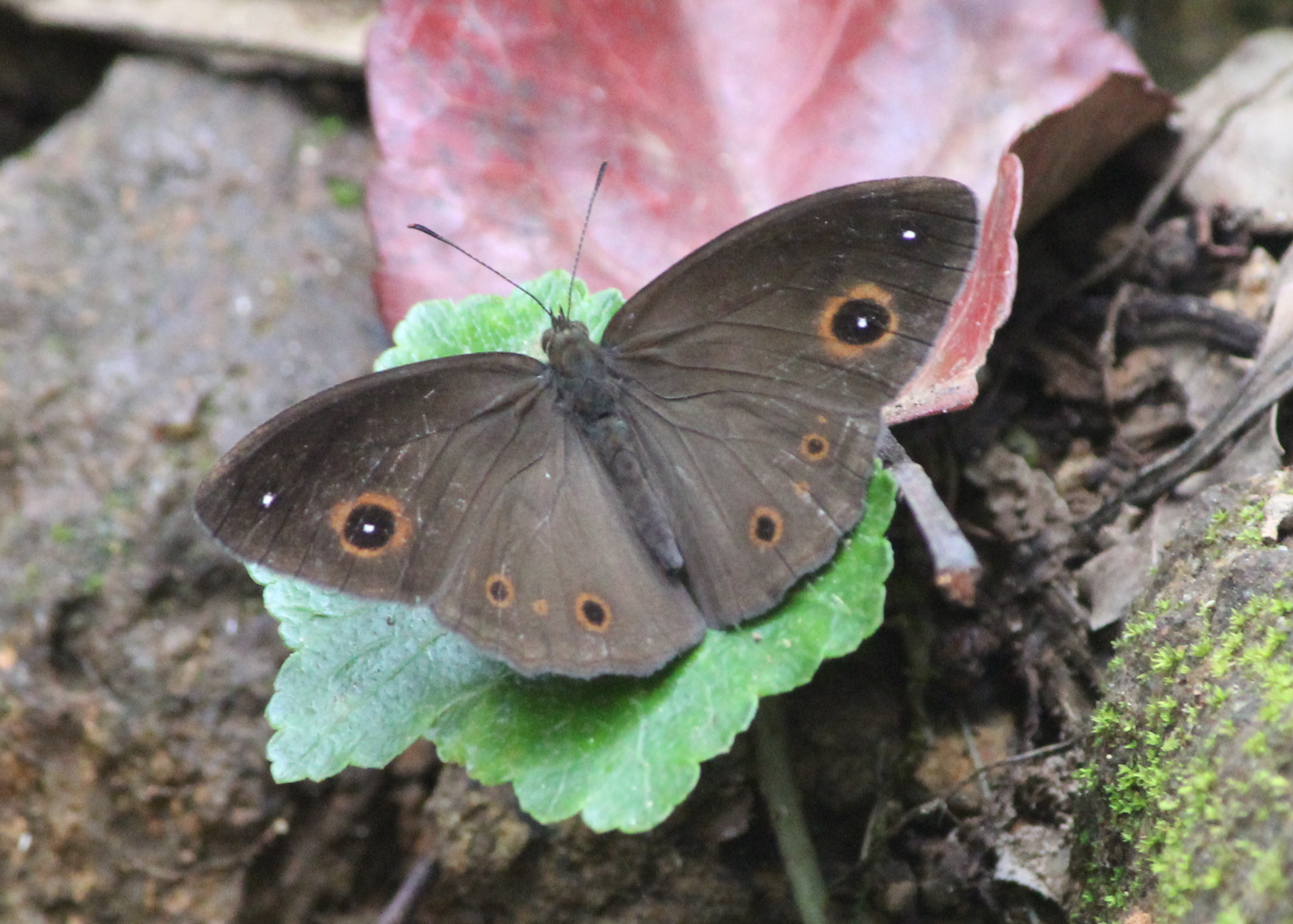

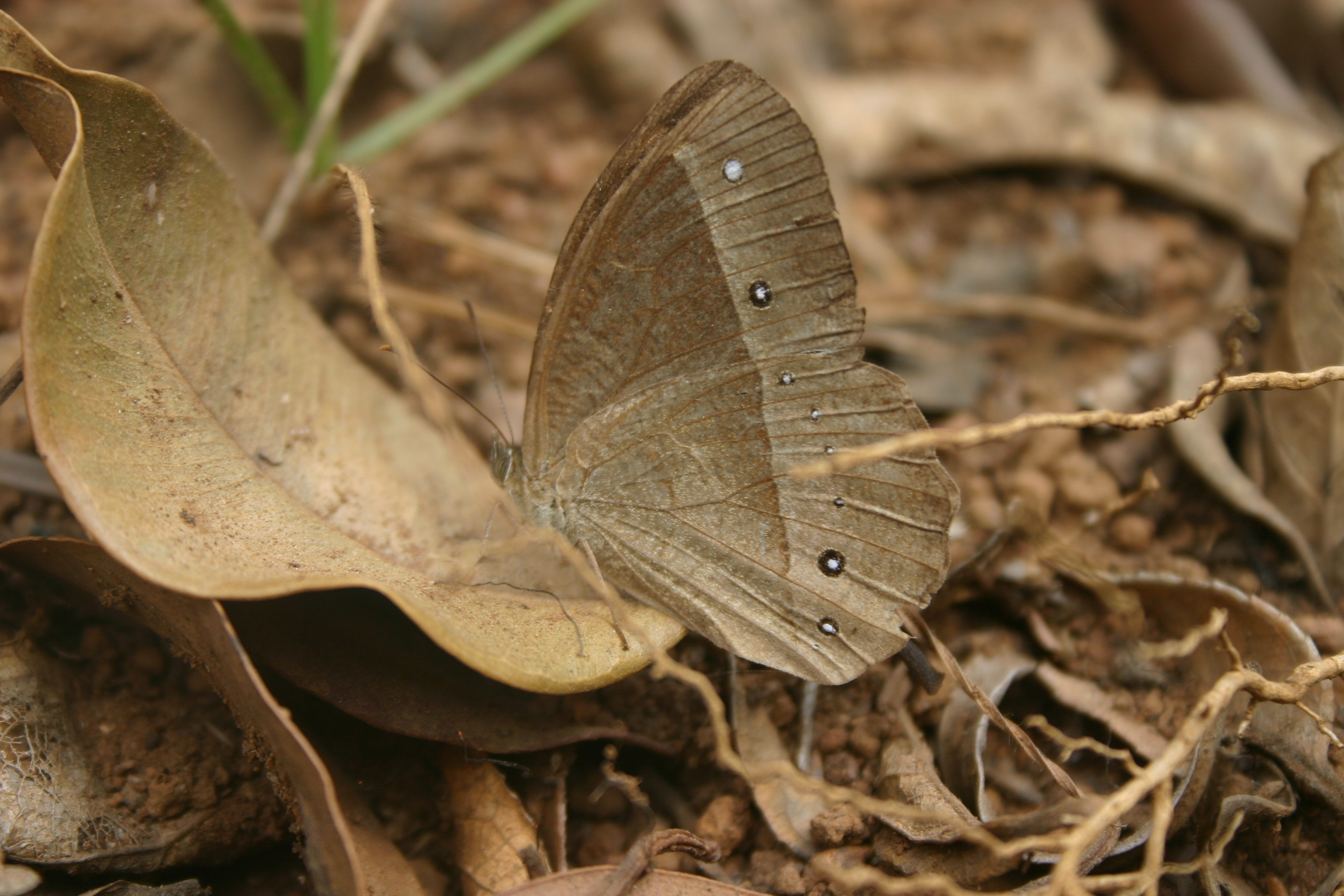

Scientific classification
- Kingdom: Animalia
- Phylum: Arthropoda
- Clade: Pancrustacea
- Class: Insecta
- Order: Lepidoptera
- Family: Nymphalidae
- Genus: Telinga
- Species: T. adolphei

Binomial name
- Telinga adolphei (Guérin-Ménéville, 1843)

Synonyms
- Satyrus adolphei Guérin-Ménéville, 1843; Mycalesis adolphei (Guérin-Ménéville, 1843); Mycalesis onatas Hewitson, 1864

= Telinga adolphei =

Redeye bushbrown

Species of butterfly

Telinga adolphei, the red-eye bushbrown, is a species of satyrine butterfly found in southern India. The species name is after Adolphe Delessert who collected the first specimens based on which the species was described.

== Description ==
Upperside dark umber brown. Forewing with a large, white-centred, fulvous-ringed black median ocellus and a white-centred preapical much smaller black spot. Hindwing uniform, a post-median series of from two to four white-centred fulvous-ringed black ocelli, sub-equal and smaller than the posterior ocellus on the forewing. Underside: ground colour similar, but irrorated (sprinkled) with obscure transverse striae of a deeper brown; the terminal margins of both forewings and hindwings very broadly paler; the dark basal portion of the wings sharply defined by a very dark brown line; a postmedian series on both wings of rather small white-centred fulvous-ringed black ocelli—two on the forewing, a median and a preapical; seven, placed in a slight curve, on the hindwing. Antennae, head, thorax and abdomen dark umber brown, paler beneath. Male sex-mark of form 2, the patch of specialized scales on both forewing and hindwing very small; the nacreous area surrounding the specialized scales on the underside of the forewing very pale brown.
