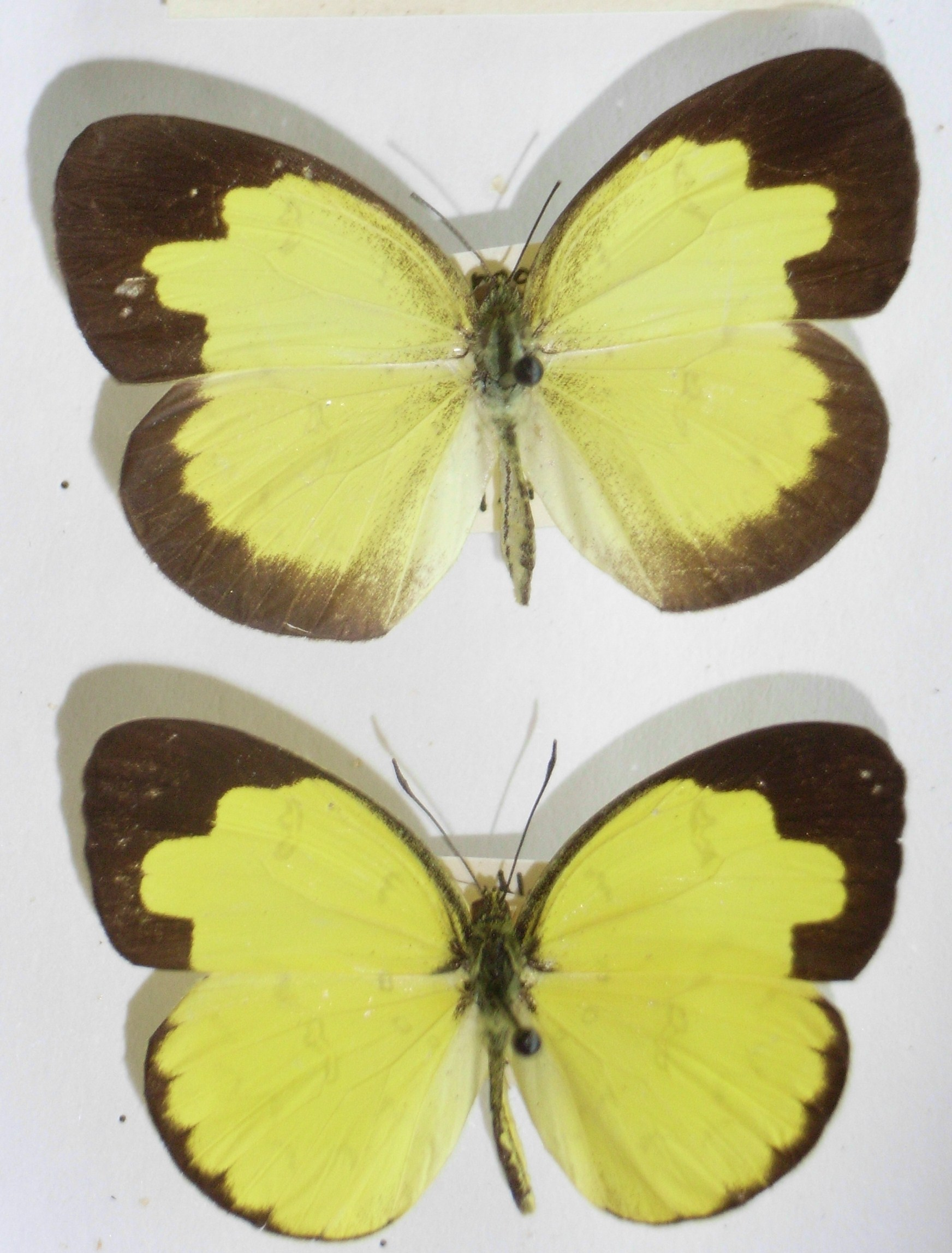
- Museum specimens from Malaya
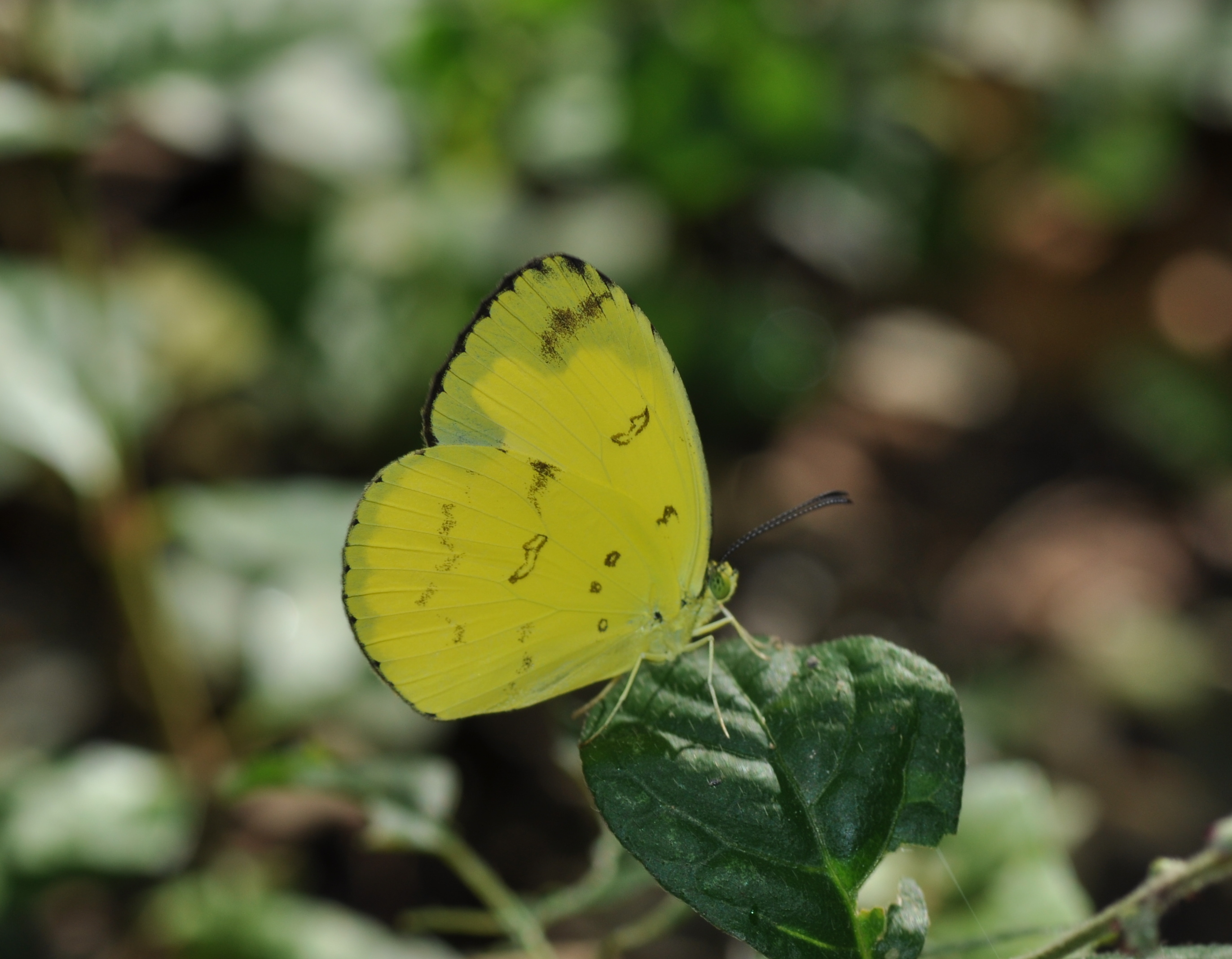

Scientific classification
- Kingdom: Animalia
- Phylum: Arthropoda
- Clade: Pancrustacea
- Class: Insecta
- Order: Lepidoptera
- Family: Pieridae
- Genus: Eurema
- Species: E. andersonii

Binomial name
- Eurema andersonii (Moore, 1886)

Synonyms
- Terias andersonii Moore, 1886; Eurema andersoni inouei Shirôzu & Yata, 1981; Eurema andersoni borneensis Shirôzu & Yata, 1981

= Eurema andersonii =

One-spot grass yellow

Species of butterfly

Eurema andersonii, the one-spot grass yellow or Anderson's grass yellow, is a small butterfly of the family Pieridae, that is, the yellows and whites, which is found in Bangladesh, India, Myanmar and other parts of Asia.

== Description ==
Wet form: Male. Upper-side. Fore-wing with the outer marginal band moderately broad, the medial portion inclined slightly inward, and the lower portion very slightly inclined obliquely-outward. Hind-wing with a moderately broad outer band. Underside with slightly defined ordinary markings. Fore-wing with two cell-marks, basal obsolescent. Female not seen.

Dry form (fig. 2a, b). Male. Upper-side similar to the wet form. Underside with the ordinary markings distinct. Fore-wing with a medial cell mark, and a more or less well-defined sub-apical patch.

Female. Upper-side paler. Fore-wing with slightly broader outer band. Hind-wing with a moderately broad outer band. Underside similar to the male.

— Charles Swinhoe, Lepidoptera Indica. Vol. VII

== Subspecies and distribution ==
Subspecies are:

- E. a. andersoni (Moore, 1886) Peninsular Malaya, Langkawi, Singapore, Sumatra, Borneo, Thailand and Indo-China
- E. a. godana (Fruhstorfer, 1910) Taiwan
- E. a. udana (Fruhstorfer, 1910) West Java
- E. a. ormistoni (Watkins, 1925) South India
- E. a. anamba (Corbet & Pendlebury, 1932) Anambas
- E. a. evansi (Corbet & Pendlebury, 1932) Andaman
- E. a. jordani (Corbet & Pendlebury, 1932) Sikkim and Bhutan
- E. a. konoyi (Morishita, 1973) Palawan
- E. a. nishiyamai (Shirôzu & Yata, 1981) Nias Island
- E. a. kashiwaii (Shirôzu & Yata, 1981) Sumba Island
- E. a. sadanobui (Shirôzu & Yata, 1982) Thailand, Laos, Cambodia, southern Vietnam, and southern Yunnan
- E. a. albida (Shirôzu & Yata, 1982) Borneo (Sarawak)
- E. a. shimai (Yata & Gaonkar, 1999) southern India

== Life cycle ==
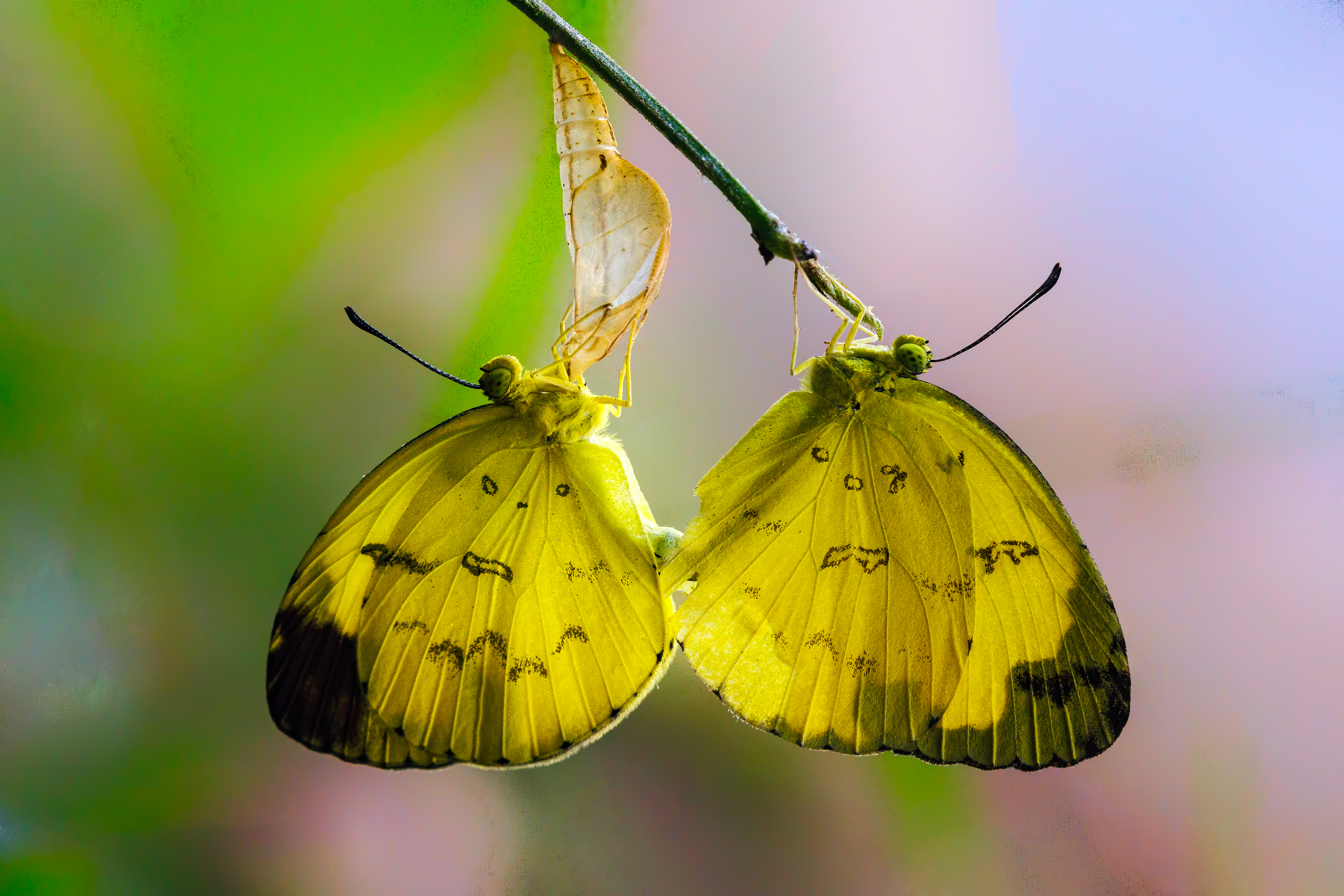
Mating after eclosing from a chrysalis

The larvae have been recorded on Ventilago goughii.

== See also ==
- List of butterflies of India
- List of butterflies of India (Pieridae)
