= Kothamangalam Assembly constituency =

Constituency of the Kerala legislative assembly in India

Kothamangalam
- Constituency No. 87 for the Kerala Legislative Assembly
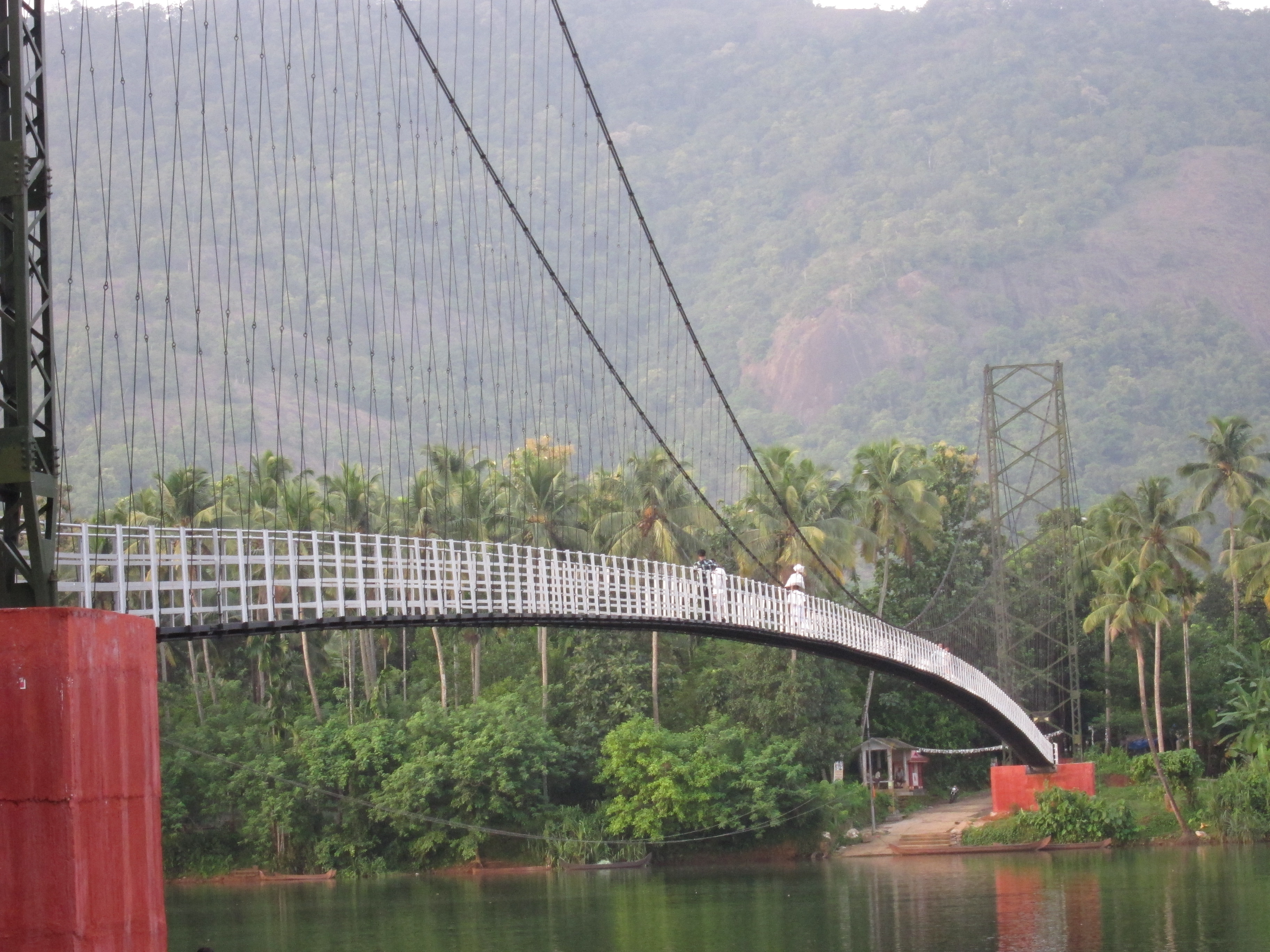
- Inchathotty suspension bridge, Kothamangalam

Constituency details
- Country: India
- Region: South India
- State: Kerala
- District: Ernakulam
- Established: 1965
- Total electors: 1,71,968 (2026)
- Reservation: None

Member of Legislative Assembly
- 16th Kerala Legislative Assembly
- Incumbent Shibu Thekkumpuram
- Party: Kerala Congress
- Elected year: 2026

Kothamangalam is one of the 140 Kerala Legislative Assembly constituencies in Kerala in southern India. It is also one of the seven constituencies included in Idukki Lok Sabha constituency. As of the 2026 Kerala Legislative Assembly election, the current MLA is Shibu Thekkumpuram of the Kerala Congress party. The Jacobite Syrian community is a decisive factor in poll results here.

== Local self-governed segments ==
Kothamangalam Assembly constituency is composed of the following local self-governed segments:

Sl no.	Name	Status (Grama panchayat/Municipality)	Taluk
1	Kothamangalam	Municipality	Kothamangalam
2	Kavalangad	Grama panchayat	Kothamangalam
3	Keerampara	Grama panchayat	Kothamangalam
4	Kottappady	Grama panchayat	Kothamangalam
5	Kuttampuzha	Grama panchayat	Kothamangalam
6	Nellikuzhi	Grama panchayat	Kothamangalam
7	Pallarimangalam	Grama panchayat	Kothamangalam
8	Pindimana	Grama panchayat	Kothamangalam
9	Varappetty	Grama panchayat	Kothamangalam

== Members of the Legislative Assembly ==
The following list contains all members of Kerala Legislative Assembly who have represented the constituency:

Election	Niyama Sabha	Member	Party	Tenure
1967	3rd	T. M. Meethiyan	CPI(M)	1967 – 1970
1970	4th	M. I. Markose	Independent	1970 – 1977
1977	5th	M. V. Mani	KEC	1977 – 1980
1980	6th	T. M. Jacob	KC(J)	1980 – 1982
1982	7th	T. M. Jacob	KC(J)	1982 – 1987
1987	8th	T. M. Jacob	Independent	1987 – 1991
1991	9th	V. J. Paulose	INC	1991 – 1996
1996	10th	V. J. Paulose	INC	1996 – 2001
2001	11th	V. J. Paulose	INC	2001 – 2006
2006	12th	T. U. Kuruvilla	KEC	2006 – 2011
2011	13th	T. U. Kuruvilla	KC(M)	2011 – 2016
2016	14th	Antony John	CPI(M)	2016 - 2021
2021	15th	Antony John	CPI(M)	2021 - 2026
2026	16th	Shibu Thekkumpuram	KEC	Incumbent

== Election results ==
Percentage change (±%) denotes the change in the number of votes from the immediate previous election.

=== 2026 ===
There were 1,71,968 registered voters in the constituency for the 2026 Kerala Assembly election.

2026 Kerala Legislative Assembly election: Kothamangalam
Party	Candidate	Votes	%	±%
KEC	Shibu Thekkumpuram	73,479	52.83	▲10.53
CPI(M)	Antony John	56620	40.71	▼6.39
BDJS	Aji Narayanan	7046	5.07	▲1.67
Social Democratic Party Of India	Roy Arackal	703	0.51	▼0.43
RJP	Finto Xavier	137	0.1	−
Independent	Shibu Kallekkattu	297	0.21	−
Independent	Shibu Chalekkattu	192	0.14	−
NOTA	None of the above	617	0.44	▲0.14
Margin of victory		16859	12.12	▲7.32
Turnout		139091	80.88	▼3.53
KEC gain from CPI(M)		Swing	▲10.53	

=== 2021 ===
There were 1,61,940 registered voters in the constituency for the 2021 Kerala Assembly election.

2021 Kerala Legislative Assembly election: Kothamangalam
Party	Candidate	Votes	%	±%
CPI(M)	Antony John	64,234	47.1	−
KEC	Shibu Thekkumpuram	57,629	42.3	−
TTP	Dr. Joe Joseph	7,978	5.8	−
BDJS	Shine K Krishnan	4,638	3.4	−
SDPI	T.M. Moosa	1286	0.94	−
NOTA	None of the above	414	0.3	−
Margin of victory		6,605	4.8	
Turnout		1,36,283	84.41	−
CPI(M) hold		Swing		

=== 2016 ===
There were 1,59,539 registered voters in the constituency for the 2016 Kerala Assembly election.

2016 Kerala Legislative Assembly election: Kothamangalam
Party	Candidate	Votes	%	±%
CPI(M)	Antony John	65,467	50.98	−
KC(M)	T. U. Kuruvilla	46,185	35.96	▼13.30
Independent	P. C. Cyriac	12,926	10.06	−
SDPI	Anas N. A.	1,490	1.16	▼3.21
NOTA	None of the above	803	0.63	−
PDP	Yahiya Thangal	775	0.60	−
Independent	T. K .Kuruvilla	357	0.28	−
Independent	Cherian Abraham	261	0.20	−
Independent	Anto John	163	0.13	−
Margin of victory		19,282	15.02	
Turnout		1,28,427	80.50	▲6.02
CPI(M) gain from KC(M)		Swing		

=== 2011 ===
There were 1,44,256 registered voters in the constituency for the 2011 election.

2011 Kerala Legislative Assembly election: Kothamangalam
Party	Candidate	Votes	%	±%
KC(M)	T. U. Kuruvilla	52,924	49.26	
Independent	Skariah Thomas	40,702	37.88	
BJP	K. Radhakrishnan	5,769	5.37	
SDPI	Shine Muhammed	4,691	4.37	−
Independent	Skaria Thomas	1,008	0.94	−
Independent	T. T. Kuruvilla	718	0.67	−
Independent	Devaki Narayanan	524	0.49	−
Independent	Joy Davasia	419	0.39	−
Independent	Skaria Thomman	363	0.34	−
Independent	Somini Prabhakaran	319	0.30	
Margin of victory		12,222	11.38	
Turnout		1,07,437	74.48	▼4.87
KC(M) gain from KEC		Swing		

== See also ==
- Kothamangalam
- Ernakulam district
- List of constituencies of the Kerala Legislative Assembly
