= M. I. Markose =

Indian politician

Maliyil Ithappiri Markose (10 January 1923 – 20 January 2012) was a politician and social activist from Kerala.

== Life ==
Markose was born on 10 January 1923 to Ithappiri and Sosa. He married Annamma, and has two sons and three daughters.

In 1947, he entered politics via the INC, and in 1964 he entered the fourth Kerala Legislature, representing Kothamangalam, Kerala. He served for seven years as a Member of the Legislative Assembly.

He served as the President of Pindimana Pachayath for 15 years, and as the manager of Athanickal U P school from the school's beginning. Markose played a significant role in the formation of the Kerala Congress, along with T. M. Jacob, K. M. Mani and P. J. Joseph. During his term as its president, Panchayath received its first bus and hospital. He also served as the executive member of Mar Athanasius College in Kothamangalam, and as a member of BDC, as well as various other clubs in that town. He died on 20 January 2012.
