= Thrikkariyoor Mahadeva Temple =

Hindu temple in India

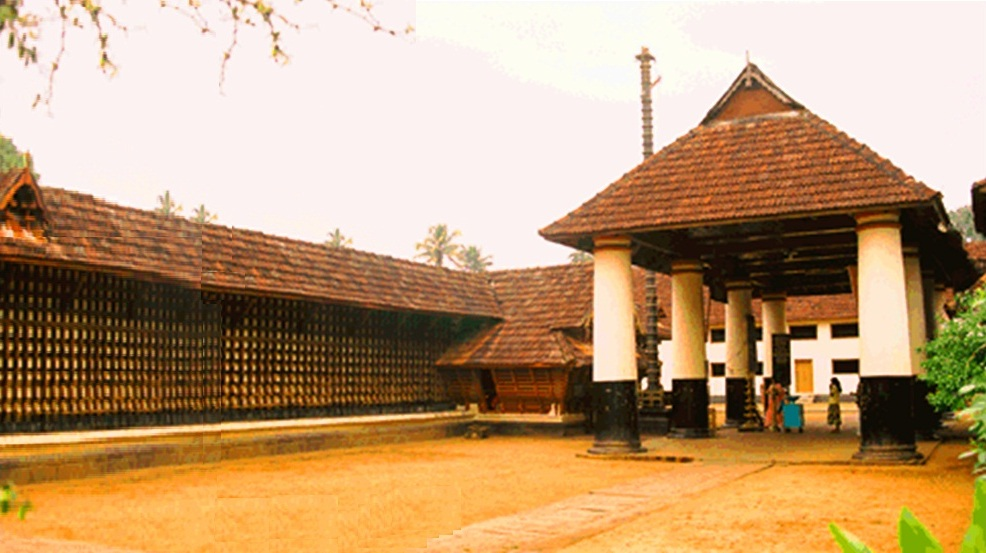
- Main Temple Structure

Religion
- Affiliation: Hinduism
- District: Ernakulam District
- Deity: Thrikkariyurappan
- Festival: Maha Shivaratri

Location
- Location: Thrikkariyoor, Kothamangalam
- State: Kerala
- Country: India
- Interactive map of Thrikkariyoor Mahadeva Temple
- Coordinates: 10.084759°N 76.612658°E

Architecture
- Type: Kerala style
- Creator: Chera Dynasty
- Completed: Not known
- Monument: 1

Thrikkariyoor Mahadeva Temple is located in the town of Kothamangalam in Ernakulam district, on the northern bank of Kothayar river, a tributary of Muvattupuzha river. It is believed that this temple is one of the 108 Shiva temples of Kerala and is considered to be the last temple installed by sage Parasurama dedicated to Shiva. Thrikkariyoor (Karuvoor or Karaorai), believed to be the headquarters of Adi Chera dynasty kings, is famous for its historical significance and legends. There are many centuries old historical records in Thrikkariyoor

== Temple Structure ==
The Thrikkakiyoor Mahadeva Temple is situated on a large temple complex of about 4 Acres. The temple faces east; there are two towers to the east and west of the temple. When you get inside the eastern tower, you see the great Anakottil. The flag mast is made of teak, covered with copper, and is very old. Bilikkal mandapom is beyond that; the ceiling roof of Bilikkal pura has beautiful wooden carvings of Ashtadikpaka and Brahma. There is a large pond in front of the eastern temple tower. The entire temple structure has been constructed to face this pond. The pond, which has an entrance house, is known as 'Eswara Seva Palace' (ml: ഈശ്വര സേവാ കൊട്ടാരം).

The main Sanctum sanctorum was constructed of two floors in the rectangular shape. This is one of the large rectangular Sanctum sanctorum (Sreekovil) in Kerala. The two floors of the Sanctum sanctorum (sreekovil; ml: are copper. The sreekovil (Sanctum sanctorum) is adorned with beautiful frescoes and wooden sculptures. Though mural paintings were created earlier, for movies only painted in 2013. The backyard of the nalambalam is decorated with light house. Inside, there are huge doors on both sides. These devotees use the pamphlet and rest. There is a door on the southern doorway and a patrol on the northern doorway. The south west coast of Nalambalam have Thadapalli for the naivedyam preparations.

== See also ==
- 108 Shiva Temples
- Temples of Kerala
