= Bhoothathankettu =

Periyar Barrage (Bhoothathankettu Dam)
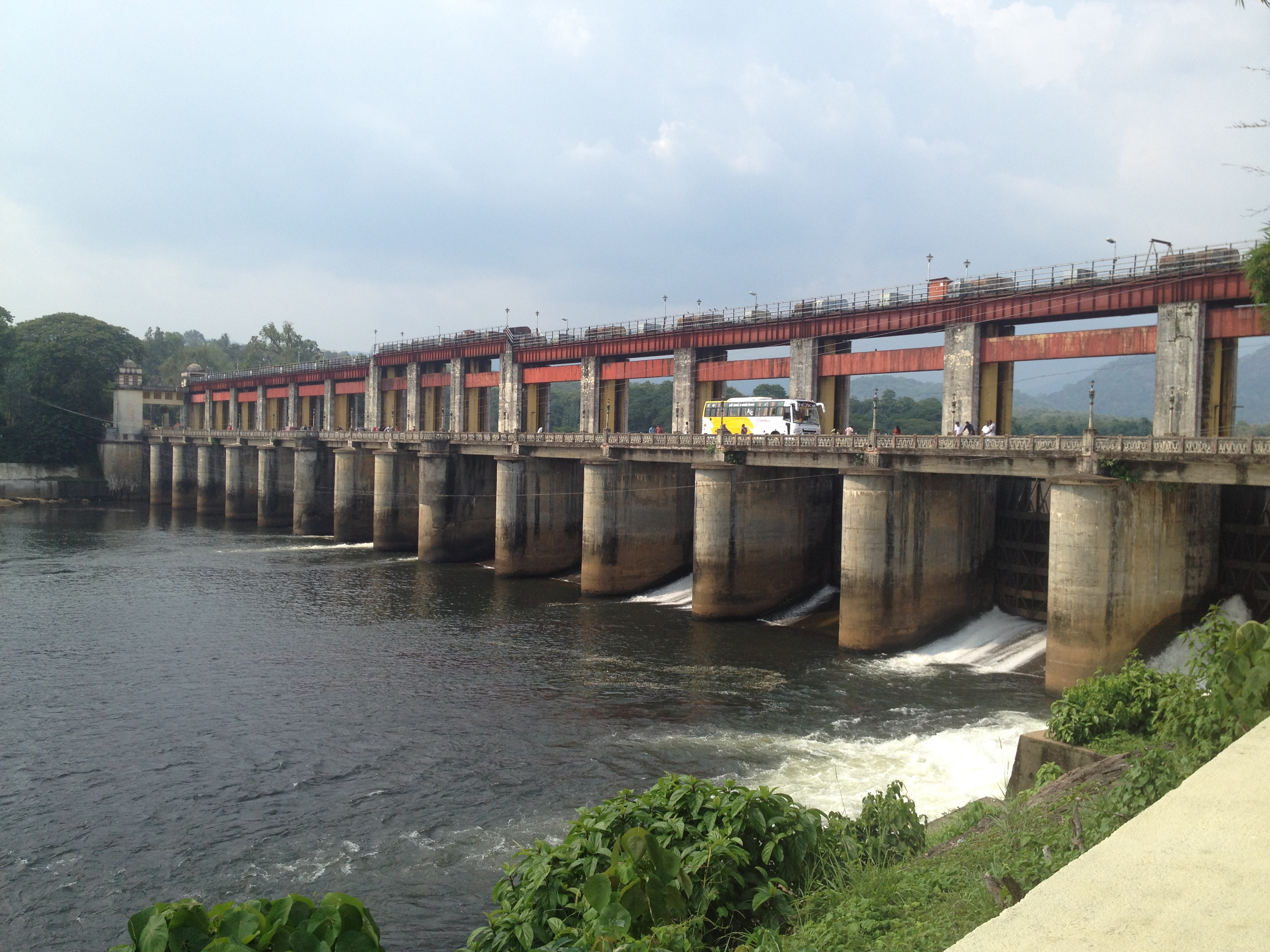

- Location within India Location within Kerala Location within Tamil Nadu
- Country: India
- Coordinates: 10°08′11″N 76°39′44″E
- Purpose: Irrigation, water supply, salinity control
- Status: Operational
- Opening date: 1964
- Owner: Government of Kerala
- Operator: Periyar Valley Irrigation Project

Dam and spillways
- Type of dam: Barrage
- Impounds: Periyar River
- Length: 210.92 m

Reservoir
- Creates: Bhoothathankettu Reservoir
- Website https://irrigation.kerala.gov.in/

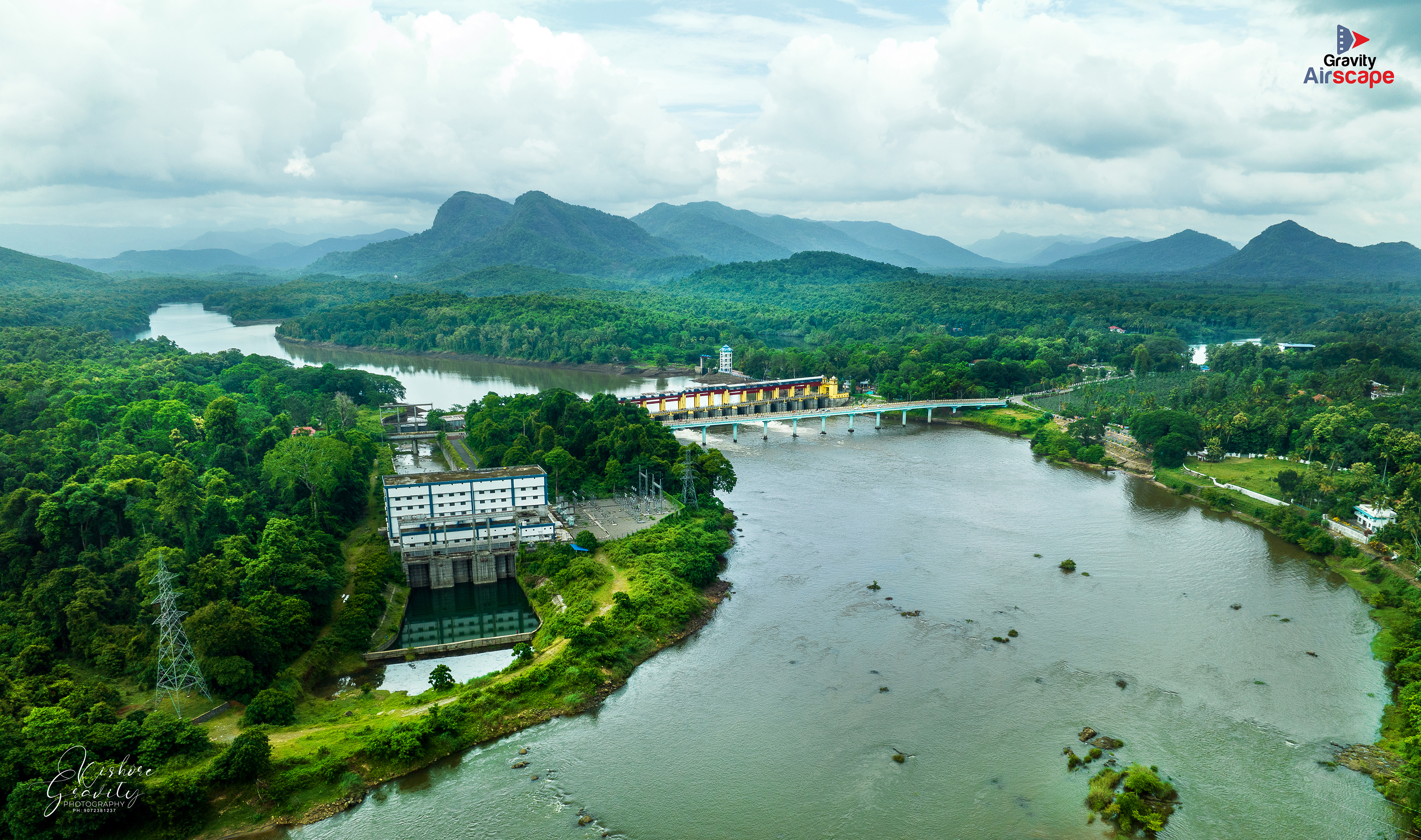
Bhoothathankettu

Bhoothathankettu is a dam and tourist spot in Ernakulam district in Kerala. It is situated outside the village of Pindimana, about 10 km away from the town of Kothamangalam and 50 km away from the main city of Kochi. The original natural dam has been supplemented by a modern dam impounding the Bhoothathankettu Reservoir (Thattekad Reservoir).

Large blocks of unshaped stones are placed on both sides of the Periyar River to form the dam. The name Bhoothathan Kettu, means "monster fort"; past generations believed it was built by a Bhootham (monster).

== Folklore ==
Local legend says the reason behind the dam's name is that monsters (Malayalam: Bhootham) planned to submerge the Trikkariyoor temple, whose presiding deity is Lord Shiva by making a dam in the Periyar river and flooding the area. Suspecting trickery, Shiva came up with a plan to deter them. He faked the approaching dawn by a rooster's sound. The demons fearing the arrival of light fled the place. To this day there is a visible proof of their effort where you can see the boulders which the demons were supposed to have rolled onto the riverbed, the Old Bhoothathankettu. The Periyar flows on through the narrow space which the demons did not quite manage to dam up.

== Natural formation ==
It has been attributed to two great floods – one in the 4th century and the other in 1341, which threw open the port of Kochi. The massive landslides during the flood are believed to have caused gigantic rocks to roll down from the mountain and become entrenched in the Old Bhoothathankettu.

== 2007 boat tragedy ==
On 20 February 2007, 18 people, including three teachers, nine boys and six girls of a school excursion group from St Antony's UP School in Elavoor, Ernakulam district of Kerala drowned in Periyar river at Thattekkad. The tragedy occurred when water leaked into their boat, causing it to overturn. The boat involved in the accident needed repair and was overloaded.

Pedal boats and speed boats are provided. The area around the boating facility is landscaped with tree houses and a children's play area. There is also a restaurant. There is a nature walk trail after the dam through thick growth to the old Bhoothathankettu and the return path is parallel to the river. However, the river contains deep sections and strong currents. Idamalayar Dam is 14 km drive through the thick jungle from Bhoothathankettu dam. It is forbidden to use the stretch without permission.

== Transportation ==
The railway station at Aluva (a northern suburb of the city of Kochi) is about 43 km away. Cochin International Airport is about 42 km and 26 km from Kochi city (Cochin).

== Bhoothathankettu Mud Race 2018 ==
Bhoothathankettu Mud Race is conducted as part of the Onam an annual holiday and a National Festival of Kerala, every year. Entertainment programs and adventurous games are the main attractions of Bhoothathankettu Fest.

== Bhoothathankettu New Bridge ==
The bridge built (296 m length and 11 m width) parallel to the Bhoothathankettu Dam was opened to the public for transportation. Irrigation Minister of Kerala K. Krishnankutty inaugurated the bridge on 10 June 2020.

== Gallery ==
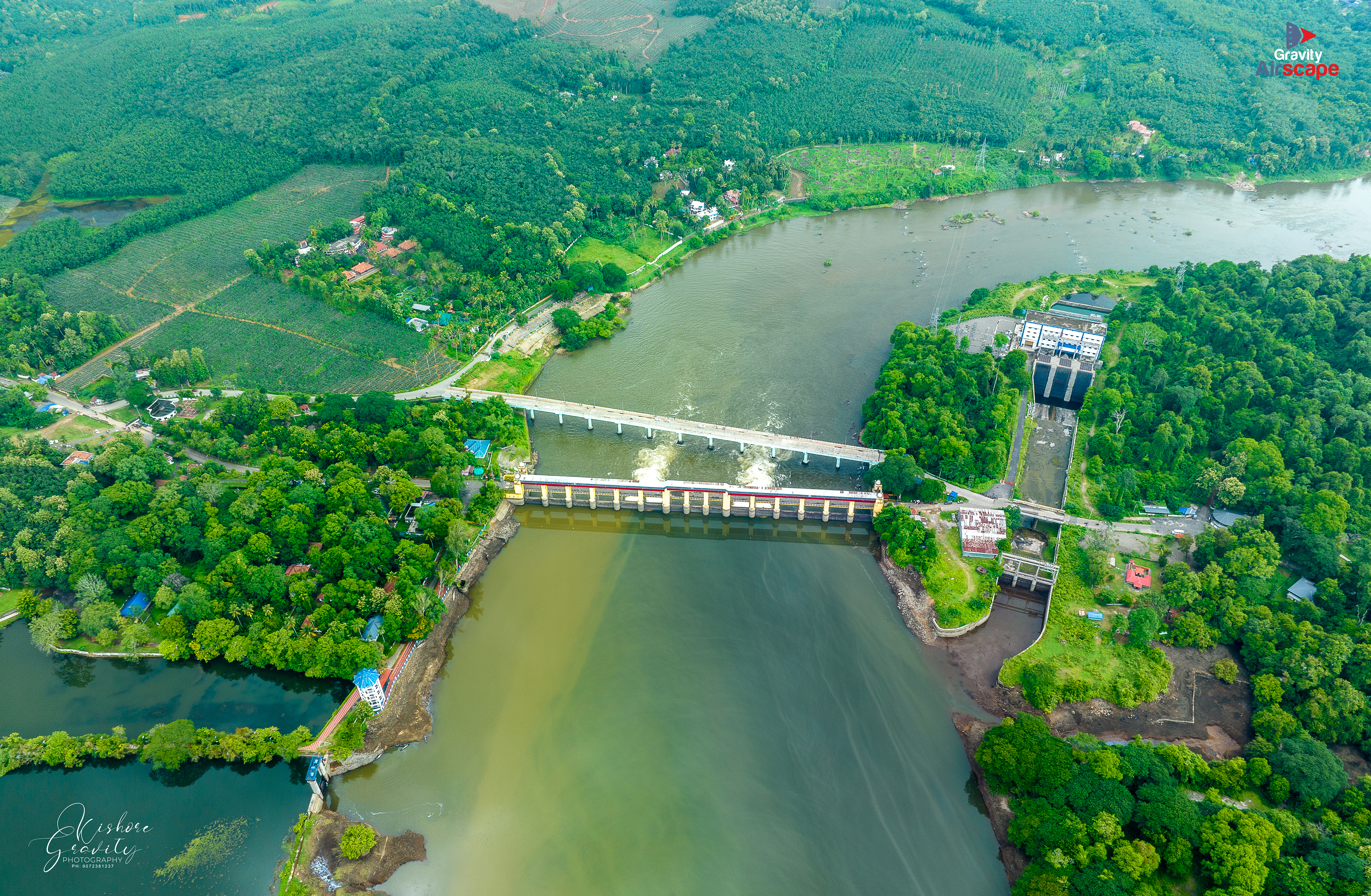
From above

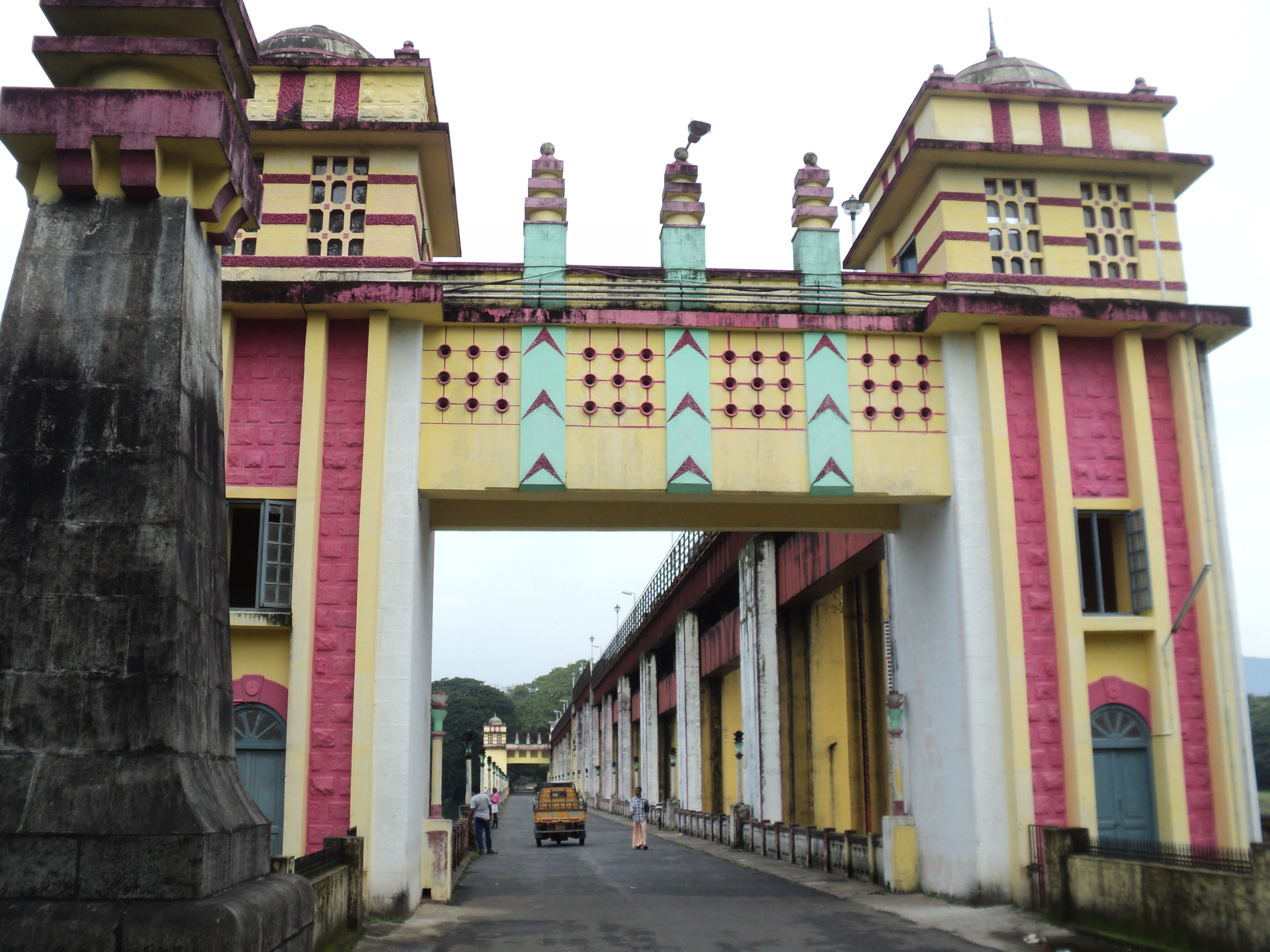
Barrage

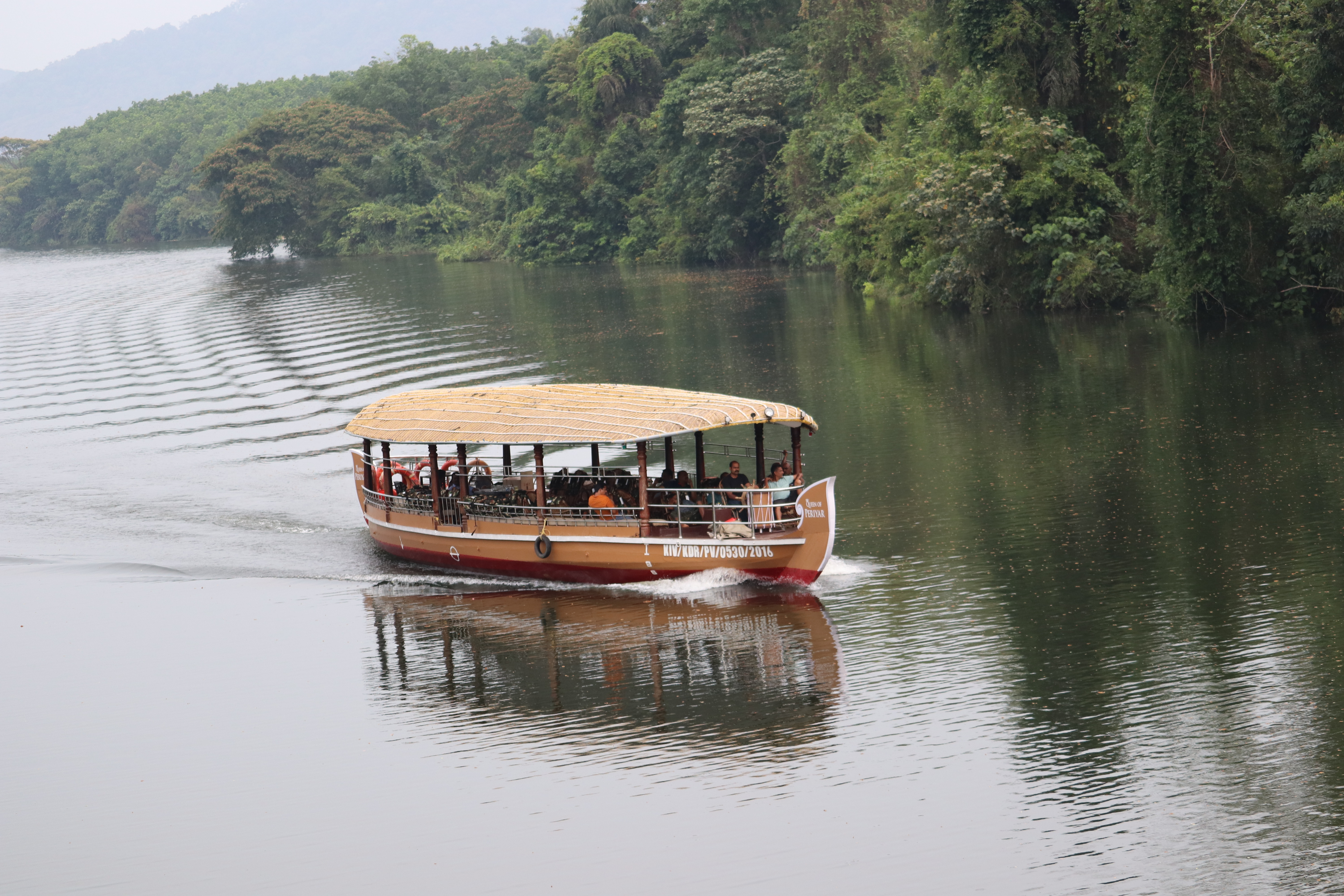
Boating in Bhoothathankettu Dam
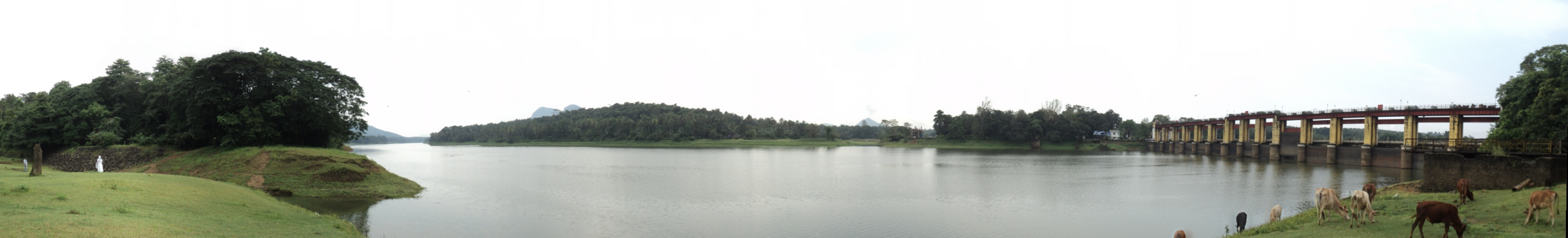
Panoramic view from meadows
