= Greenvalley Public School =

Location
- Nellikuzhi, Kothamangalam, Kerala; India; 10.0745°N 76.6020°E

Information
- Type: Private elementary and secondary
- Motto: Service before Self
- Established: 1995
- Founder: Molly Pradeep
- School district: Ernakulam
- Grades: K–12
- Campus: Kothamangalam
- Colours: Green and white
- Affiliation: CBSE

Greenvalley Public School is an educational institution in Nellikuzhi, Kothamangalam, in the state of Kerala, India. It is affiliated to Central Board of Secondary Education, New Delhi, for AISSE (Grade 10) and AISSCE (Grade 12) examinations. It was established in 1996 by Molly Pradeep, late wife of the present director, Pradeep Kuriakose. It has a sister school in Perumbavoor, which provides elementary education.

== Academics ==
The school has eight periods a day, each around 40 minutes. The school day runs from 9:30 until 3:30. A snack break is held from 10:55-11:00am, lunch break from 12:55-1:20pm, and another short break from 2:45-2:50pm.

The school is open for Mothers' Pride to Grade 12 [Kindergarten to 12th standard] and the age group is from 3 years to 17 years. The school is divided into sub-juniors (kindergarten to III), juniors (III–VI) and seniors (VII-X) and super-seniors (XI and XII) classes.

== Facilities ==
- Computer laboratory
- Mathematics laboratory
- Biology, physics and chemistry laboratories
- Library with magazines, newspaper and books
- Music, dance, jazz, yoga, sports, karate, drawing, work experience and art and crafts room
- Courts for basketball, tennis, badminton and martial arts
- First aid room with qualified nurses
- Stationery store, providing pens, pencils, books, other basics and uniform clothes
- Clean and hygienic washroom and toilets
- 15 school buses

== Club system ==
All students from classes III to X belong to one of the four clubs. The four clubs with their colours and mascots are:

- Victors - blue, Unicorn
- Legends - green, Lion
- Elites - red, Dragon
- Leaders - yellow, Horse

Each house is assigned a captain from class X, a vice-captain from class IX and three teachers-in-charge. Each house competes to win the best House Award every year. Inter-house competitions are also held throughout the year starting with floral carpet competitions during Onam celebrations. An inter-house sports tournament is also held, with track and field sports and chess competitions.

== School committee ==
The director and principal jointly choose a girl and a boy from class XII as head girl and head boy, who represent students in school programmes. The student committee is led by the head boy, the head girl and a sports captain from class XII. The house captains and vice captains are also members of the committee.

== Extra-curricular activities ==
Extra-curricular activities include football, volleyball, badminton, swimming, drawing/painting, drama, debate and quiz.

Elocution, recitation, quiz and light music are conducted on Arts Day. Indian games including Kho kho and kabaddi are also encouraged.

== School programmes ==
The school-conducted programmes include an Arts Day, Sports Day, Science/Maths/Computer Fair and celebrations on Christmas and Onam. For entertainment purposes the school conducts an anniversary celebration as well as an excursion. The school's anniversary function has been conducted biennially since 2005. The school also conducts the Kerala Mango Festival, at Ernakulam Town Hall in 2010 and at Kakkanad in 2014. Students from classes VII, VIII, IX and X organise the event under the guidance of the director and principal.
