= T. U. Kuruvilla =

Indian politician (1936–2026)

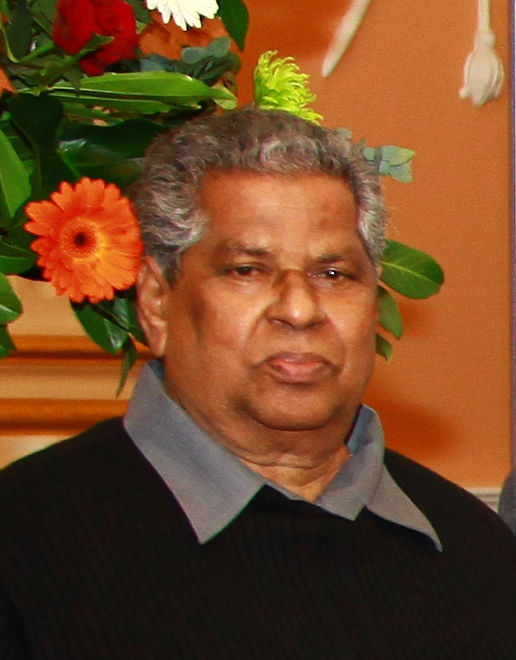

Minister for Public Works, Government of Kerala
- In office 2006 September 15 – 2007 September 14
- Preceded by: P. J. Joseph
- Succeeded by: Mons Joseph

Member of Legislative Assembly, Kerala
- In office 2011 and 2006
- Preceded by: VJ Poulose
- Succeeded by: Antony John
- Constituency: Kothamangalam

Personal details
- Born: 13 September 1936 Oonjapara, Kothamangalam, Kingdom of Cochin, India
- Died: 29 May 2026 (aged 89) Kochi, Kerala, India
- Party: Kerala Congress
- Spouse: Chinnamma Kuruvilla
- Children: One son and four daughters
- Parent(s): T. O. Uthuppu and Mariyam

Thombrayil Uthup Kuruvilla (13 September 1936 – 29 May 2026) was an Indian politician from Kerala. A well known agriculturist and businessman, he was elected to Kerala Legislative Assembly consecutively in 2006 and 2011 from Kothamangalam constituency. Kuruvilla briefly served as Public Works Minister in the government led by V. S. Achuthanandan.

Kuruvilla belonged to Kerala Congress (Joseph), and represented Kothamangalam from 2006 to 2016 in the legislative assembly of Kerala. Kuruvilla belonged to Jacobite Syriac Orthodox Church and served as its Lay Secretary for quite a long time. He was decorated with Chevalier title & Mor Aphrem Medal, Commander title and Bar E'tho Shariro title, by Patriarch Ignatius Zakka I Iwas, the Supreme head of Universal Syriac Orthodox Church for his contributions to Society and Church. Considering Chev. Kuruvilla's humanitarian activities and contributions to the Society, South Eastern University in London conferred upon him an honorary doctorate (DLitt).

== Background ==
Thombrayil Uthup Kuruvilla was born at Oonjappara, Kothamangalam, Kingdom of Cochin, on 13 September 1936, to Uthuppu and Mariyam. He did his diploma in civil engineering.

Kuruvilla died on 29 May 2026, at the age of 89.

== Political career ==
Kuruvilla was the president of Keerampara Panchayat in Eranakulam district, Kerala for fourteen years (1964–1978), President of Keerampara Service Co-Operative Society (1966–1970), Chairman of Block Development Committee, Kothamangalam (1970–1978), Chairman of Plantation Corporation of Kerala (1982–1987). He was also the chairman of the Kerala State Housing Board (KSHB) during 1996–2001. He defeated UDF candidate V. J. Paulose in the 2006 assembly elections in Kothamangalam. He participated in the 2016 Kerala assembly election representing Kothamangalam assembly constituency and was defeated by opposition candidate Antony John of Communist party.

He was the Vice-Chairman of the Kerala Congress(M) Party and also a notable person both in the socio-political and church circles.

=== Minister ===
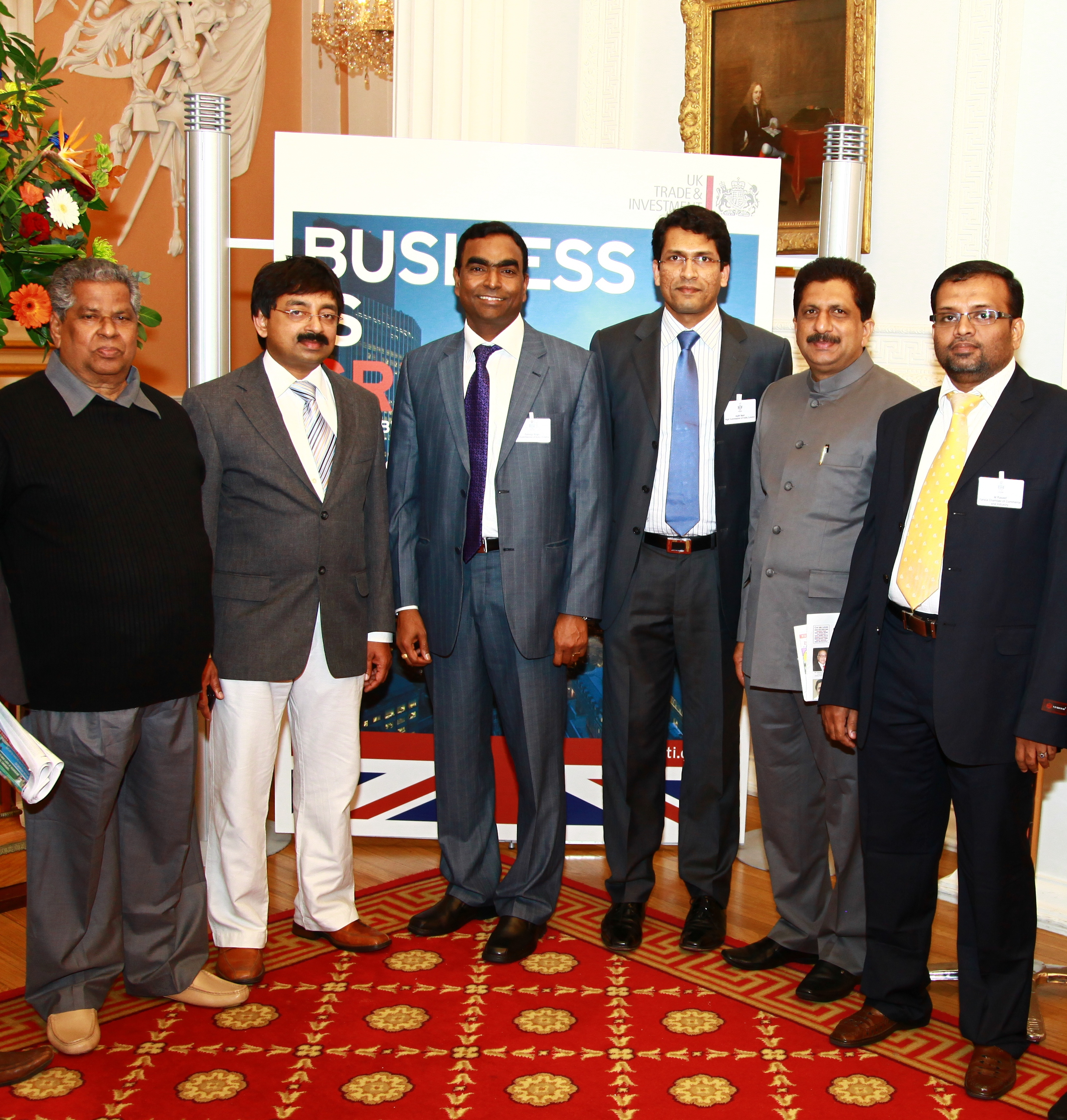
Kuruvilla and Monce Joseph along with Raju George as First Secretary and Ajithkumar J Varma as the protocol officer of the High Commission of India, at Mansion House, London attending the India-UK Infrastructure Meeting

Kuruvilla became minister for public works in the Kerala cabinet in November 2006 when P. J. Joseph stepped down following allegations that he had misbehaved with a woman co-passenger while on a flight journey.

== Positions held ==
- Minister, Public Works Department (PWD), Kerala State
- President, Keerampara Panchayat in Eranakulam district, Kerala for fourteen years (1964–1978)
- President, Keerampara Service Co-Operative Society (1966–1970)
- Manager, St. Stephan's School, Keerampara (1968–1978)
- Chairman, Block Development Committee, Kothamangalam (1970–1978)
- Chairman, Plantation Corporation of Kerala (1982–1987)
- Chairman, Kothamangalam Municipal Standing Committee (1991–1992)
- Chairman & Executive Director, Kerala State Housing Board (KSHB) (1996–2001)
- Lay Secretary, Jacobite Syrian Orthodox Church (1993–1999)
- Member, Ernakulam District Development Committee (1964–1982)
- Member, Rubber Board (1983–1987)
- Member, Angamali Diocesan Council of Jacobite Syrian Orthodox Church (From 1962)
- State Treasurer and State Secretary of Kerala Congress (J) (1977–1989, 1989–1992)
- Councillor, Kothamangalam Municipal Standing Committee (1988–1993)
- Trustee, St. Stephen's Jacobite Syrian Orthodox Bes-Aniya Church, Chelad (1963)
- Convenor, Angamali Diocesan Trust (1989–1997)
- Member of Legislative Assembly, Kothamangalam Constituency

== Later responsibilities ==
- Deputy Chairman, Kerala Congress
- Chairman, Manjanikkara Dayaro Committee (Since 2001)
- Member, Malankara Jacobite Syrian Educational & Charitable Trust
- Member, YMCA, Lions Club, Y's Men Club
- Member, Mar Athanasious College Association, Kothamangalam (Since 1972)
- Member, Staff Selection Committee, Mar Athanasious College Association (Since 1976)
- Member, Inter Church Council
- Member, Nilakkal St. Thomas Church & Ecumenical Centre Trust
- Member, All Kerala Educational Managers Council
- Secretary, Baselios Paulose II Catholicos College, Piravom (Since 1995)
- Secretary, Baselios Paulose II Catholicos College, Piramadom
- Secretary, Patriarch Ignatius Zakka I Training College, Malelcuriz (Since 1996)
- Secretary, St. Gregorios Dental College, Chelad, Kothamangalam

== Controversy ==
Kuruvilla resigned from the Kerala cabinet on 2 September 2007, after an initial investigation report by the then district Collector of Idukki, Raju Narayana Swamy "found misappropriations in the land dealings in which Minister Kuruvilla and his family is involved". According to a Kuwait-based NRI businessman K.G. Abraham, the minister’s son and two daughters had signed a contract with him to purchase 20 acres (81,000 m^{2}) of land in Munnar. In this purpose, they accepted Rs. 67 million from him. However, the deal could not be transacted because the land in question allegedly did not belong to the family, and Kuruvilla refused to return the money. Subsequently, party leader P J Joseph, promised to return the money to Abraham. Kuruvilla had to resign and Monce Joseph from the KC(J) became the new PWD minister.

However, since there was no credible inquiry, Joseph later claimed that neither the report of the district collector nor that of the chief secretary accused Kuruvilla of any malpractices. He further said that there was a conspiracy against the party and Kuruvilla to taint them.

On 15 May 2008, Kerala Police informed a lower court that the case of forgery against him was a "mistake of fact" and they could not find any substantive evidences.
