= Inchathotty =

Village in India

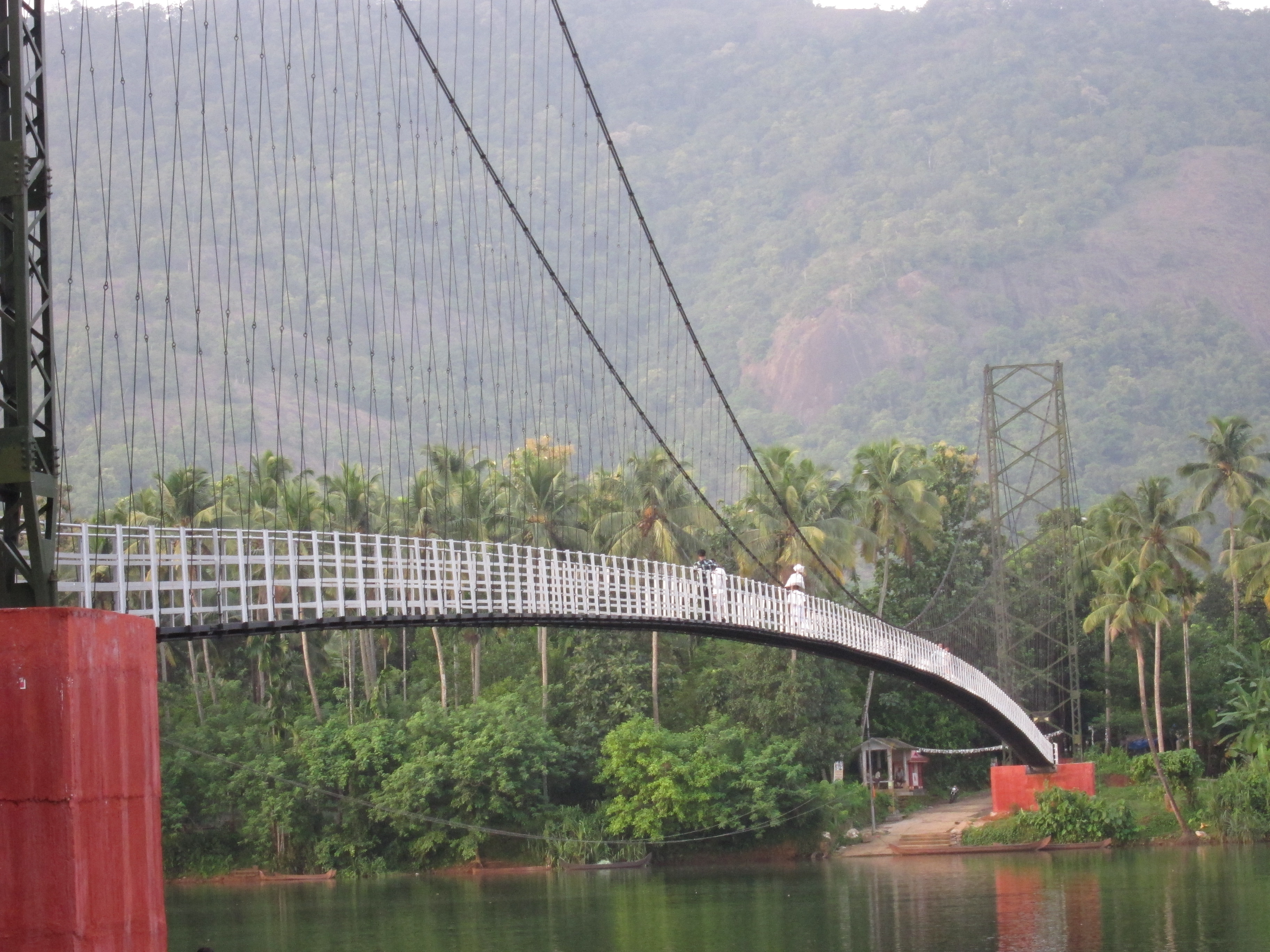
A picture of the Inchathotty Hanging Bridge

Inchathotty is a village located near Neriamangalam, Thattekad and Kothamangalam in Ernakulam District in Kerala, India. It is famous for its hanging bridge (suspension bridge), which is about 183 m long and 1.2 m (4 ft) wide. It is one of the longest suspension bridges in Kerala, while the Ayyappancoil Hanging Bridge in Idukki district, measuring about 200 m in length, is the longest suspension bridge in the state, The village is blessed with rich flora and fauna.

This village is located at a distance of about 10 km from Thattekkad Bird Sanctuary and 60 km from the world-famous Munnar hill station. The famous Bhoothathankettu dam and park can also be conveniently accessed at about 11 km distance.
