= Antony John =

Indian politician

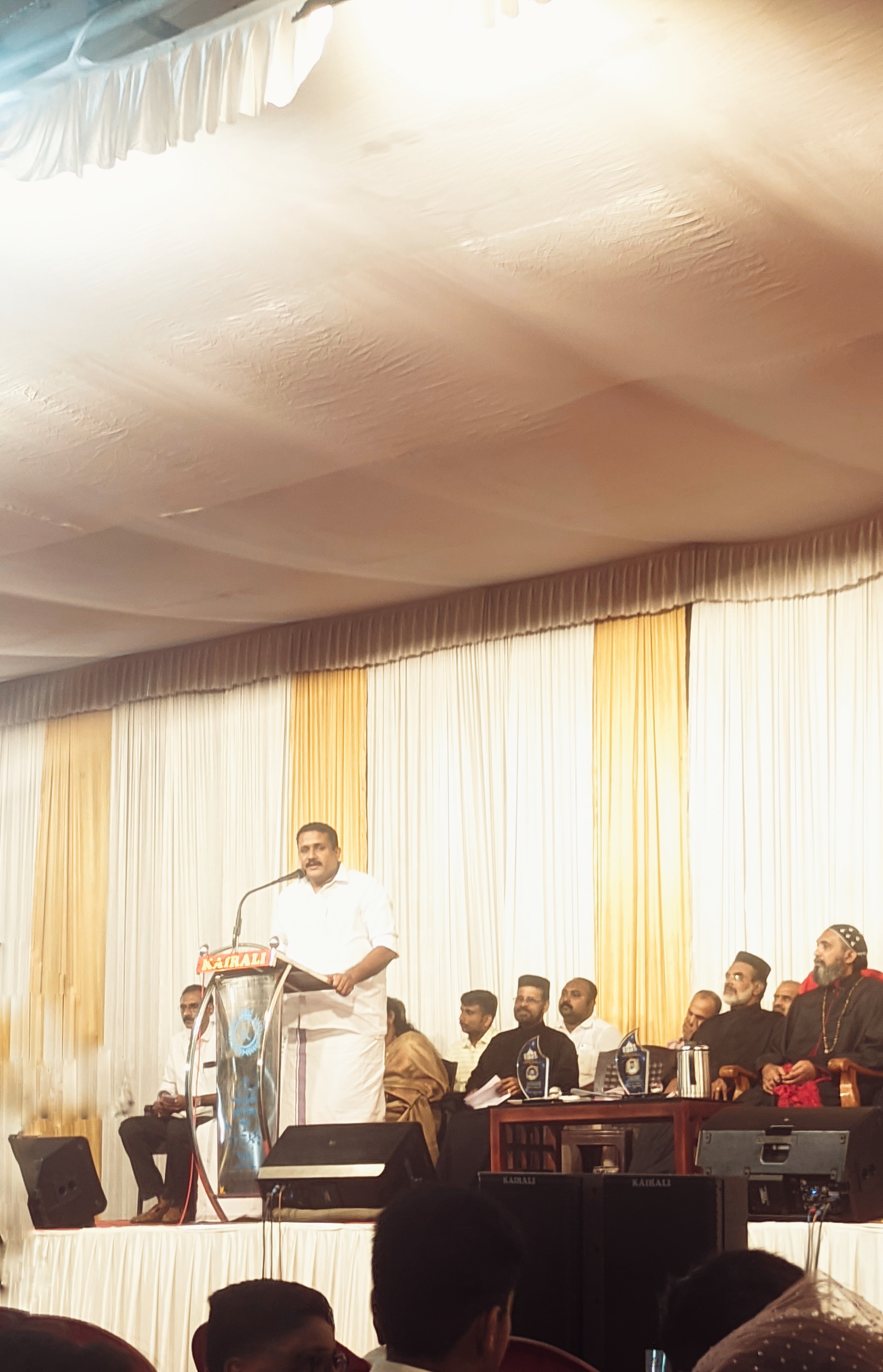

Member of the Kerala Legislative Assembly
- In office 2016–2026
- Preceded by: T. U. Kuruvilla
- Succeeded by: Shibu Thekkumpuram
- Constituency: Kothamangalam

Personal details
- Born: Kothamangalam, Kerala
- Citizenship: Indian
- Party: CPI(M)
- Occupation: Politician

Antony John is an Indian politician who served as the Member of Legislative Assembly (MLA) of Kothamangalam. He participated in 2016 Kerala assembly election representing Communist party and defeated T. U. Kuruvilla of United Democratic Front (UDF).

== Election Results ==
=== 2021 Kerala Legislative Assembly election ===
Kothamangalam Assembly Constituency Result status
O.S.N.	Candidate	Party	EVM Votes	Postal Votes	Total votes	% of votes
1	Antony John	CPI(M)	56549	0	56549	46.8
2	Dr. Joe Joeseph	Twenty 20 Party	7037	0	7037	5.82
3	T. M. Moosa	SDPI	1206	0	1206	1
4	Shibu Thekkumpuram	KEC	51159	0	51159	42.34
5	Shine K. Krishnan	BDJS	4118	0	4118	3.41
6	Anto Johny	Independent	114	0	114	0.09
7	Shibu	Independent	93	0	93	0.08
8	Shibu Thekkan	Independent	228	0	228	0.19
9	NOTA	None of the Above	339	0	339	0.28
Total			120843	0	120843	100%

=== 2016 Kerala Legislative Assembly election ===
Kothamangalam Assembly Constituency
O.S.N.	Candidate	Party	Votes	% of votes
1	Antony John	CPI(M)	65467	50.98
2	T. U. Kuruvilla	KC(M)	46185	35.96
3	P. C. Cyriac	Independent	12926	10.06
4	Anas N. A.	SDPI	1490	1.16
5	Yahiya Thangal	PDP	775	0.6
6	T. K. Kuruvila Thottathil	Independent	357	0.28
7	Cherian Abraham	Independent	261	0.2
8	Anto Johny	Independent	163	0.13
9	NOTA	None of the Above	803	0.63
Total			128427	80.5%
