= Venduvazhy =

Coordinates: 10.0445°N 76.6030°E

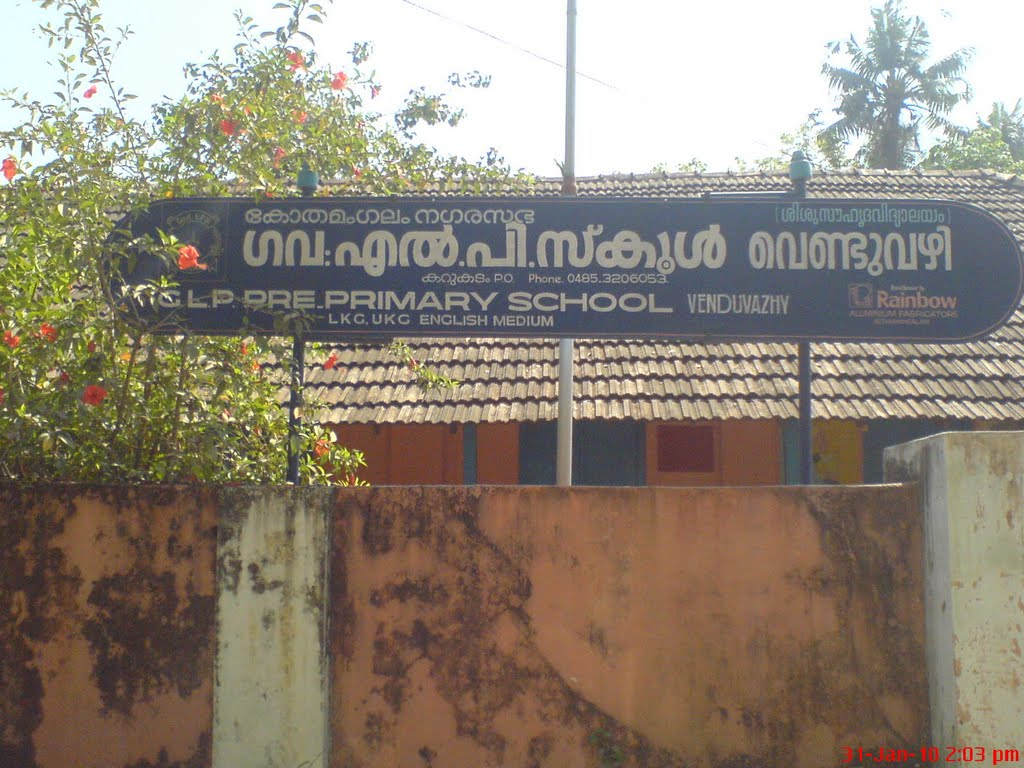
Government LP School, Venduvazhy

Venduvazhy is a village in Ernakulam District, Kerala, India. The municipal area is Kothamangalam. Its postal code is 686691.

== Demographics ==
Venduvazhy has been divided into two separate areas: Venduvazhy North and Venduvazhy South. Its population in 2011 was 2694.

== Public institutions ==
- Government L.P. School, Venduvazhy
- P. J. Antony Memorial Library
