= Shibu Thekkumpuram =

Indian politician and businessman

Member of the Kerala Legislative Assembly
- Incumbent
- Assumed office May 2026
- Preceded by: Antony John
- Constituency: Kothamangalam

Personal details
- Born: Shibu Thekkumpuram Kothamangalam, Kerala, India
- Party: Kerala Congress
- Occupation: Politician, Businessman

Shibu Thekkumpuram is an Indian politician and businessman currently serving as the member of the legislative assembly (MLA) representing the Kothamangalam constituency in the Kerala Legislative Assembly. A member of the Jacobite Syrian Christian Church, he represents the Kerala Congress (P. J. Joseph faction) and was elected in the 2026 Kerala Legislative Assembly election.

== Political career ==
Shibu Thekkumpuram is a prominent leader in the Kerala Congress.

In the 2026 elections, he successfully wrested the Kothamangalam seat back for the United Democratic Front (UDF), defeating the two-time incumbent Antony John of the CPI(M) by a margin of 16,859 votes. His victory was partly attributed to a consolidation of votes from the Jacobite Syrian Christian community, a decisive demographic in the constituency, amid ongoing disputes regarding church ownership in the region.

== Election results ==
=== 2026 Kerala Legislative Assembly election ===
Kothamangalam Assembly Constituency result status (Note: The candidates are listed by number of votes earned. The table may vary on election website)
No.	Candidate	Party	EVM Votes	Postal vote	Total votes	% of votes
1	Shibu Thekkumpuram	KEC	71958	1521	73479	52.83
2	Antony John	CPI(M)	55568	1052	56620	40.71
3	Aji Narayanan	BDJS	6917	129	7046	5.07
4	Roy Arackal	SDPI	698	5	703	0.51
5	Shibu Kallekkattu	Independent	292	5	297	0.21
6	Shibu Chalakattu	Independent	190	2	192	0.14
7	Finto Xavier	Rashtrawadi Janta Party	136	1	137	0.1
8	NOTA	None of the Above	606	11	617	0.44
Total			136365	2726	139091	100%
