= Keerampara =

- village
- Interactive map of Keerampara
- Coordinates: 10°6′0″N 76°40′0″E
- Country: India
- State: Kerala
- District: Ernakulam

Languages
  - Official: Malayalam, English
- Time zone: UTC+5:30 (IST)
- Vehicle registration: KL-
- Coastline: 0 kilometres (0 mi)
- Climate: Moderate (Köppen)
- Avg. summer temperature: 25 °C (77 °F)
- Avg. winter temperature: 12 °C (54 °F)

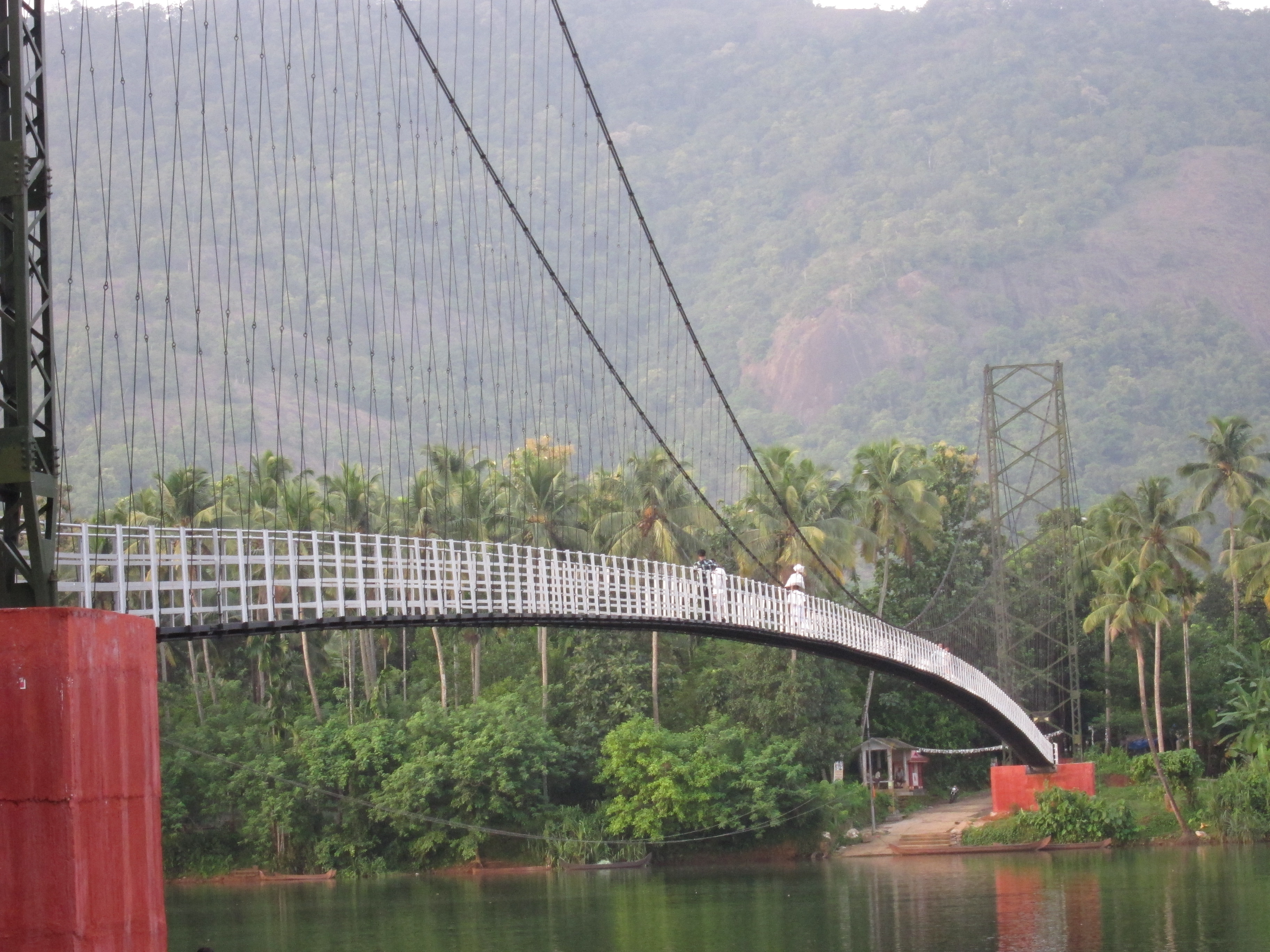
Inchathotty Hanging Bridge

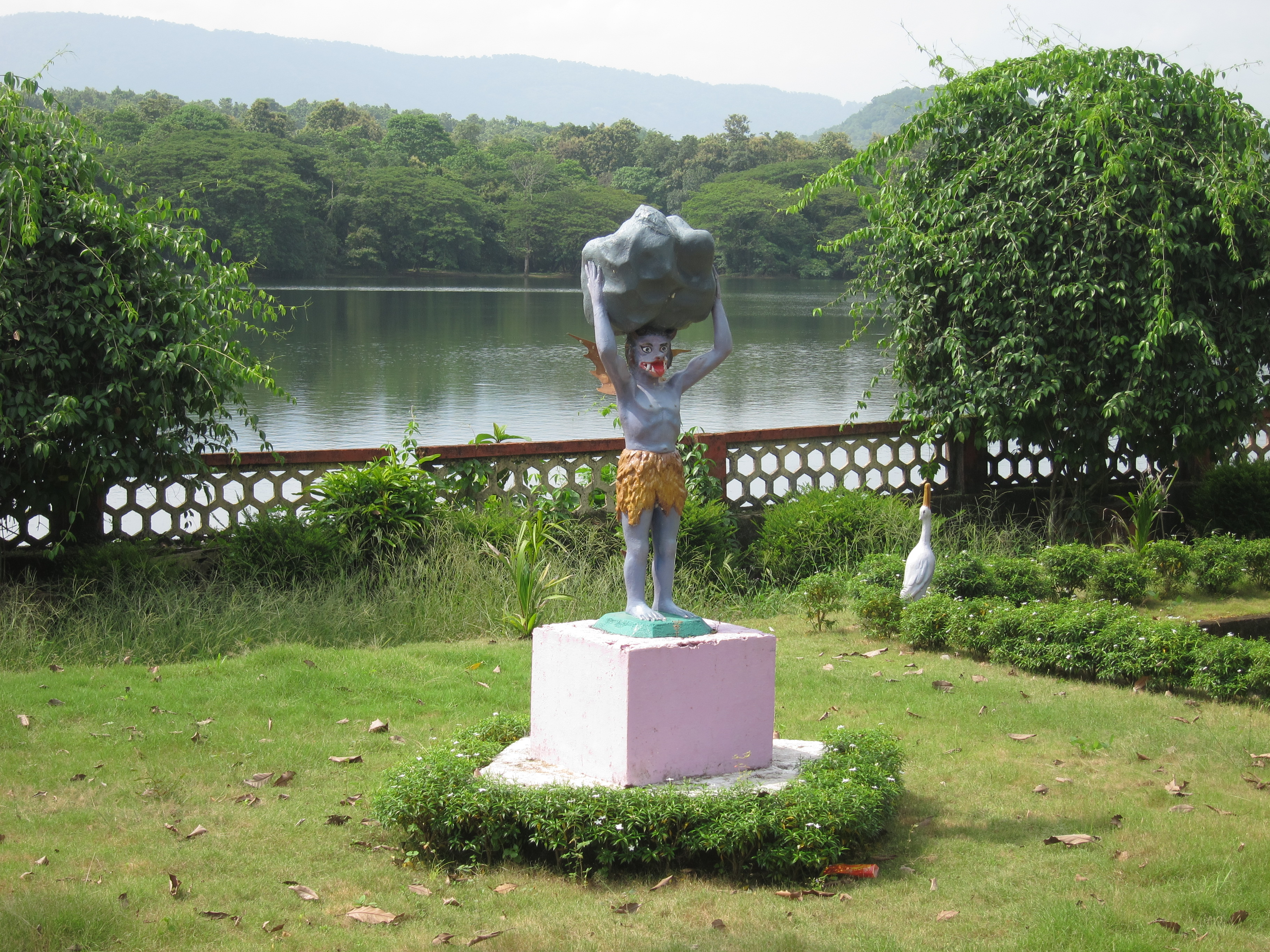
Bhoothathan Kettu

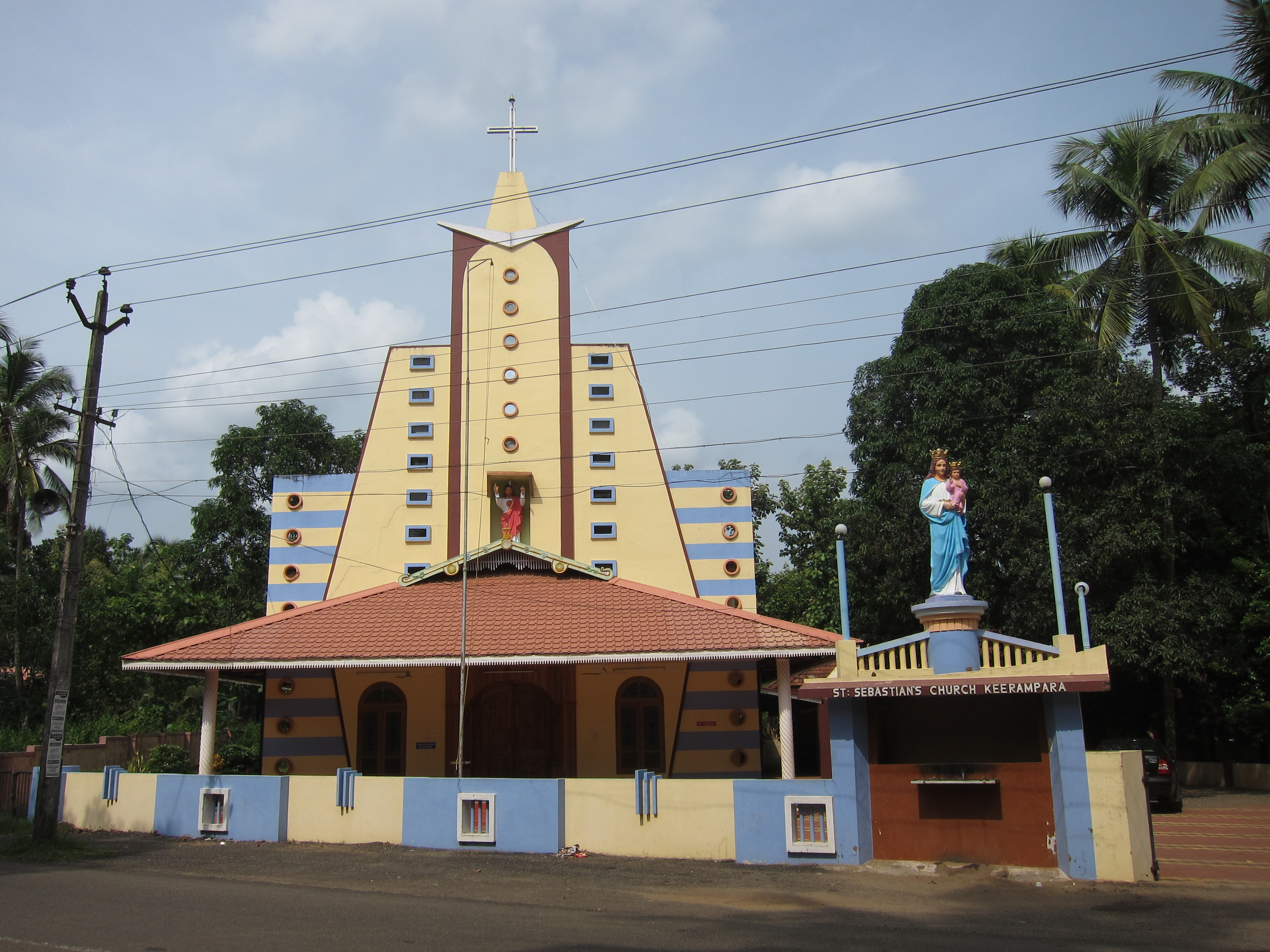
St.Sebastian Church

Keerampara is an Indian village in the state of Kerala, India. This is a junction. This place is once blessed with the footprints of all the holy personnel who passed through the Royal route (from Madurai to Kothamangalam).

== History ==
The name itself signifies its contacts with the western countries from time immemorial. This part of the country has names tagged with "para". Contrary to general belief this does not signify a rock. "Para" in the Thracian language means a "village" and thereby Keeram + para makes Keerampara = The Village of Parrots. Similarly Oonjappara becomes the Village of Swings. The Thracians had a very good influence in India before the birth of christ especially in the Ernakulam district due to the trade links with ancient Kodungalloor Musris.

The Keerampara Panchayat is encompassed with many historical locations like the Cheramala, believed to be the summer palace of erstwhile Chera kings; Kalappara, the sword fighting ground of Kings; Ayyappanmudi, the serene temple at the hill top, the royal route of Alwaye-Madura passes through this place. It was formed 1 August 1953 and its first president was the late Sri. Joseph G Chelad.

== Geography ==
Keerampara is a village ensconced at the eastern range of Ernakulam district in Kerala. It borders Chelad about 7 km (4.3 mi) from Kothamangalam, the former seat of the Chera Kings. Kothamangalam was known in old days as Malakhachira. It covers and Area of 28.745 km^{2} (11.099 sq mi). The total population is 15,000 with a population density of 522 persons/km^{2} (200 people per sq. miles.)

The main river in Keerampara Panchayat is the Karickakkuzhy River which runs for 4 km (2.5 mi) and meets at Chelad Erappungal river.

The Chera capital is in its immediate vicinity.

=== Climate ===
Two predominant seasons are experienced there: Summer and Rainy season. The maximum temperature reaches about 25 °C (77 °F). Rainfall is about 2,500 mm (98 in) per year. Winter season is moderate there during December and January.

=== Education ===
Keerampara has one higher secondary school (st stephen higher secondary school ) and two high schools (st stephen high school ) St.Joseph's high school, Velielchal.

== How to reach Keerampara ==
Nedumbassery airport is just 40 km (25 mi) from Keerampara and the nearest railway station is Aluva which is 35 km (22 mi) from Keerampara. The holy Trikkariyur temple is only 6 km (3.7 mi) from Keerampara. The holy Mar Thoma Cheria pally is 6 km from this place. Keerampara Panchayat contributes mainly to the parish of St.Stephen's Bes-Ania Valiapalli, Chelad.

== Places of tourist interests ==
- Periyar river for boat cruise; Thattekkad
- Salim Ali Bird sanctuary Thattakkad, a protected area for Tropical forest birds
- Cheramala a historical place
- Ayyappan mudi (mountain), a trekking destination
- Nadukani mudi, a trekking cum Catholic religious destination
- Oonjapara aqueduct.
- Bhoothathankettu River Barriage
- Inchathotti hanging bridge.
- Palamattam Kaalakadavu echo point.
