= Kottappady =

- village
- Location in Kerala, India Kottappady (India)
- Coordinates: 10°4′0″N 76°36′0″E
- Country: India
- State: Kerala
- District: Ernakulam

Population (2001)
  - Total: 12,990

Languages
  - Official: Malayalam, English
- Time zone: UTC+5:30 (IST)
- Postal code: 686692
- Telephone code: 0485
- Vehicle registration: KL 44
- Ernakulam: pindimana

Kottappady is a village in Kothamangalam Taluk in Ernakulam district of Kerala State, India. It belongs to Central Kerala Division. It is located 10 km from Kothamangalam. The village came into existence in the year 1953.

Kalkunnel Mar Geevarghese Sahada Jacobite Syrian Church, one of the prominent Jacobite churches in Kerala, is situated here, one of the biggest Jacobite churches in India. Kottekkevu bhagavathi temple in south Kottappady, famous for Kottekkavu Bharani (Meenam) is the first place of worship.

== Demographics ==
As of 2011 India census data, Kottappady had a population of 13,512 with 6,710 males and 6,802 females. The village had 3,357 households total, with approximately 87% literacy and approximately 91% of the population above age 6.

Education

Kottappady South Lower Primary School (GLPS), Kottappady North Lower Primary School (LPS), and Mar Elias Higher Secondary School (HSS) are among the oldest schools here.

== Government ==
Kottappady is under the Government of Kerala, and is part of the Legislative Assembly Constituencies (LAC) group 087: Kothamangalam under the 07 Ernakulam district.

== Institutions and Services ==
The government controls various village institutions and assets, including one shopping complex, one library, thirteen public wells, and eighteen public pools. Additional government institutions are shown in the table below.

Institutions, as of 2019
Institution	Location	No. of Employees
Gram Panchayat Office	Kottappady	16
Krishi Bhavan	Kottappady	4
Primary Health Center	Kottappady	15
Health Sub-centers	Plamudy, Naganchery, Uppukandam, Tholely	
Ayurvedic Hospital	Kottappady	2
Homoeopathic Hospital	Kottappady	1
Veterinary Hospital	Kottappady	6
Village Extension Office	Kottappady, Vadassery	2
Integrated Child Development Services (ICDS) Supervisor Office	Kottappady	
ICDS Anganwadis	Nellithandu, Plamudy, Cheranganal, North, Uppukandam, Vadassery, Tunnel, Thekkavumpady, Panipat, Pallipadi, Kollipparambu, Vaveli, Kuttamkulam, Cheenikkuzhi	31
Government Upper Primary School (GUPS) Panipat	Vadassery	15
Government Lower Primary School (GLPS) Fort North	Kottappady	12
GLPS (GLPS) Kottappady South	Kottappady	6
Office of the Local Self Government Department (LSGD) Assistant Engineer	Kottappady	4
Kudumbasree Office	Kottappady	2
