= Varappetty =

- Village
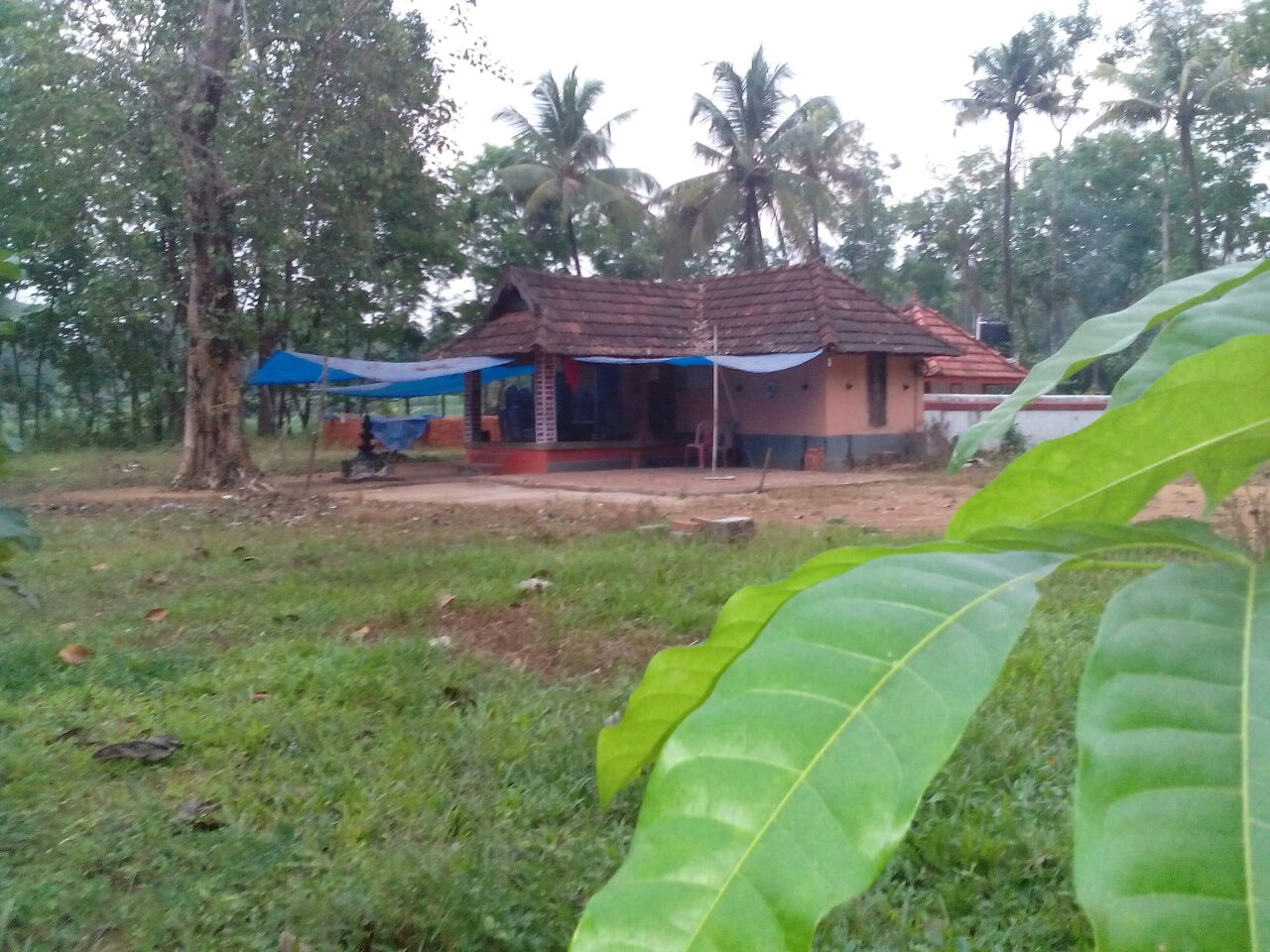
- Elangavathu Temple
- Interactive map of Varappetty
- Coordinates: 10°01′00″N 76°37′00″E
- Country: India
- State: Kerala
- District: Ernakulam

Population (2011)
  - Total: 18,867

Languages
  - Official: Malayalam, English
- Time zone: UTC+5:30 (IST)
- Postal code: 686691

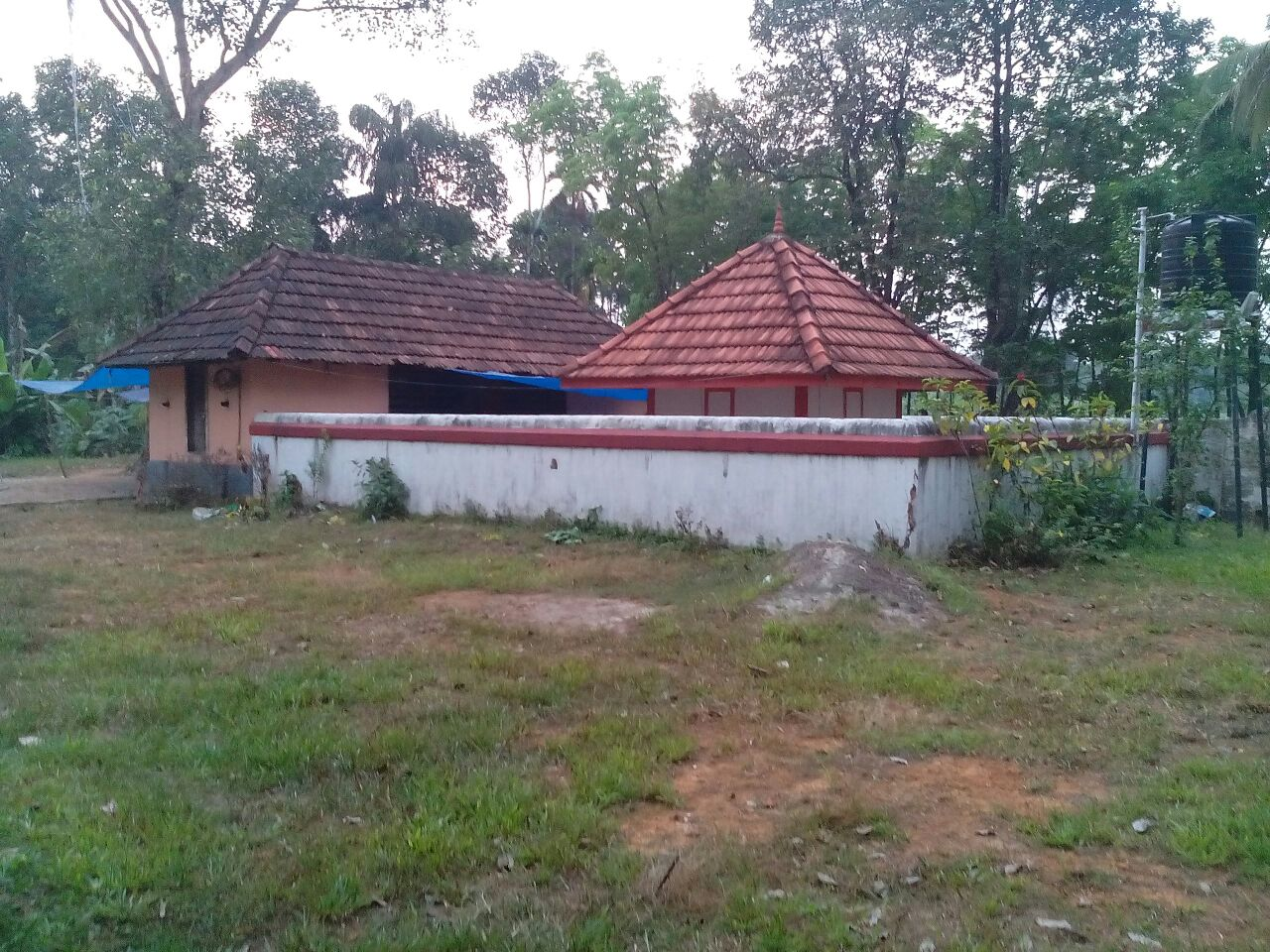
Elangavathu Kavu

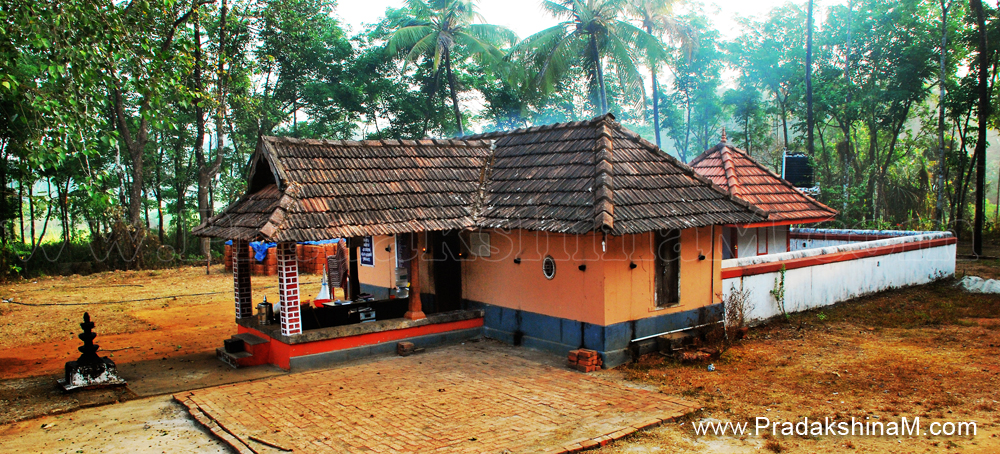
Sapthaham

Varappetty is a village in Ernakulam district in the Indian state of Kerala. Varappetty is 7 km from Kothamangalam along Kothamangalam-Vazhakulam Road, 6 km from Muvattupuzha along Puthuppady-Oonnukal Road and 12 km from Vazhakulam in Ernakulam District.

== Population ==
Varappetty is a large village located in Kothamangalam of Ernakulam district, Kerala with total 4559 families residing. The Varappetty village has population of 18867 of which 9233 are males while 9634 are females as per Population Census 2011.

In Varappetty village population of children with age 0-6 is 1801 which makes up 9.55% of total population of village. Average Sex Ratio of Varappetty village is 1043 which is lower than Kerala state average of 1084. Child Sex Ratio for the Varappetty as per census is 924, lower than Kerala average of 964.

== Work profile ==
In Varappetty village out of total population, 7500 were engaged in work activities. 81.87% of workers describe their work as Main Work (Employment or Earning more than 6 Months) while 18.13% were involved in Marginal activity providing livelihood for less than 6 months. Of 7500 workers engaged in Main Work, 618 were cultivators (owner or co-owner) while 593 were Agricultural labourer.

== Literacy rate ==
Varappetty village has higher literacy rate compared to Kerala. In 2011, literacy rate of Varappetty village was 96.03% compared to 94.00% of Kerala. In Varappetty Male literacy stands at 97.61% while female literacy rate was 94.54%.

== Facilities ==
Varappetty has a public health center with a Resident Medical Officer and 2 other doctors on OP.

Banking facilities are also present; a branch of SBI with an ATM counter is present

An aided Higher Secondary School, Upper Primary School and 2 Govt Lower Primary Schools are present to cater the education needs.

Full-fledged Public Library in Varappetty leads various cultural and literary activities across the Panchayath.

== Agriculture and Industries ==
Agriculture, mainly includes Rubber plantations, Pineapple cultivation, Paddy fields, Plantain cultivation and many more. Industries includes quarrying, plywood and curry powder manufacturing.

== Governance and Administration ==
Consists of 13 Wards with 8 women represented wards. Current administration is done under the leadership of Sangeetha Pratheesh( Pancahyath President). Other Pancahayath members includes :

- Diana Noby Kottam (1)
- Cheriyan Devassy(2)
- Angel Mary George(3)
- Ancy Haris(4)
- K.A Binod(5)
- Umaiba Nassar(6)
- Bindhu Sasi(7)
- Savitha Sreekanth(8)
- Balakrishnan Nair(9)
- Sreekala C(10)
- Nirmala Mohan(11)
- Mathew K Issac(12)
- P.V Mohanan(13)
