= Kothamangalam, Kerala =

Kothamangalam
- Municipality
- Location in Kerala, India Kothamangalam (India)
- Coordinates: 10.0683°N 76.59542°E
- Country: India
- State: Kerala
- District: Ernakulam

Government
  - Type: Municipality
  - Body: Kothamangalam Municipality
  - Chairperson: Bhanumathy Raju (INC)
  - Member of Legislative Assembly: Shibu Thekkumpuram(UDF)
  - Deputy Chairperson: Sindhu Ganeshan
- Municipal wards: 33

Area
  - Total: 40.04 km^{2} (15.46 sq mi)

Population (2011)
  - Total: 38,837
  - Density: 970.0/km^{2} (2,512/sq mi)

Languages
  - Official: Malayalam, English
- Time zone: UTC+5:30 (IST)
- PIN: 686691
- Telephone code: 0485
- Vehicle registration: KL-44
- Nearest city: Kochi
- Assembly constituency: Kothamangalam
- Lok Sabha constituency: Idukki
- Sex ratio: 1019 ♂/♀
- Website: kothamangalammunicipality.lsgkerala.gov.in/en

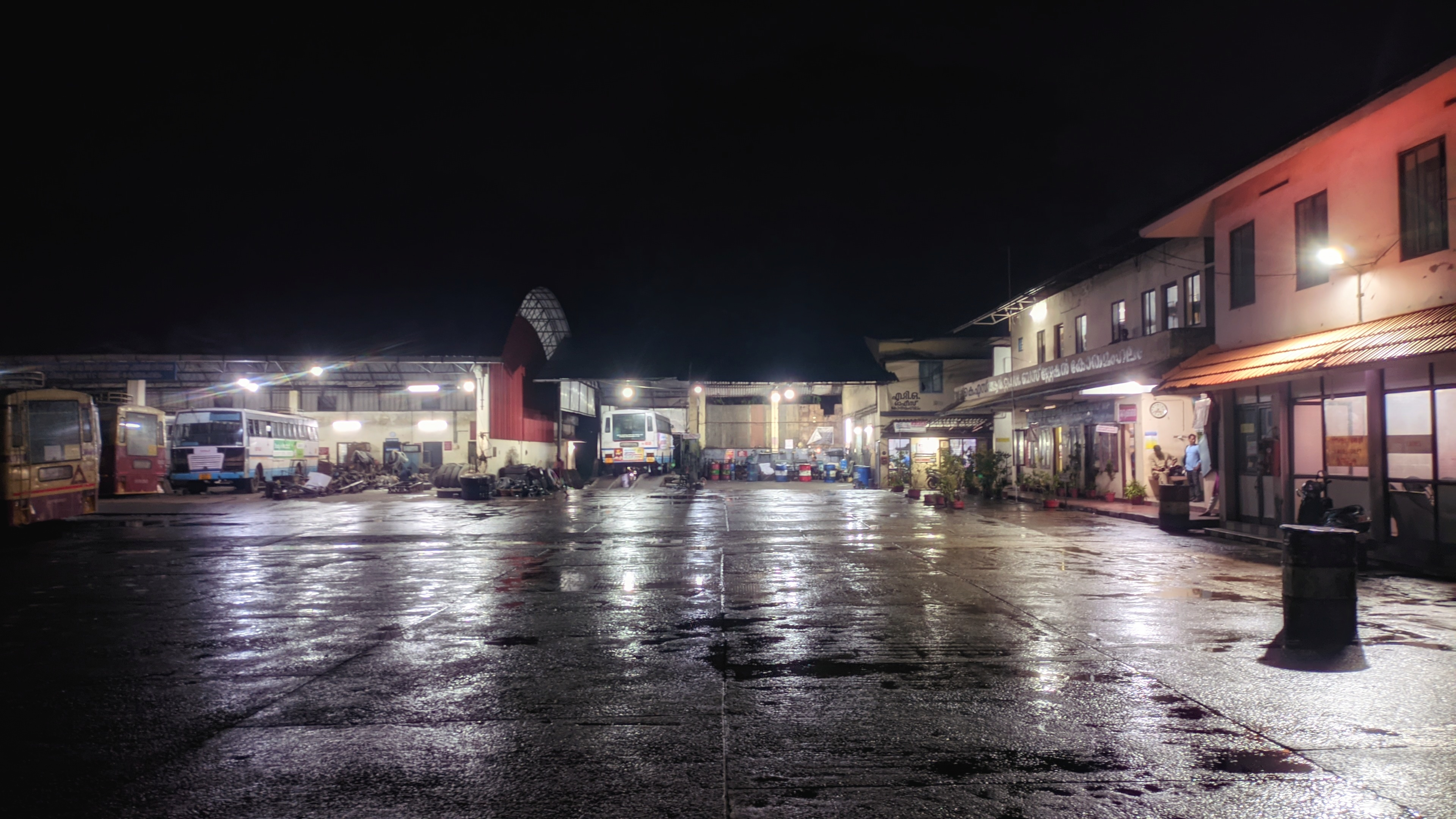
KSRTC Depo Kothamangalam on a rainy night

Kothamangalam ([koːd̪ɐmɐŋgɐlɐm]) is a municipality at the foot of the Western Ghats in the Ernakulam district of Kerala, India. It is located 42 km (26.1 mi) east of the district collectorate in Thrikkakara and about 218 km (135.5 mi) north of the state capital Thiruvananthapuram. As per the 2011 census of India, Kothamangalam has a population of 38,837 people, and a population density of 969/km^{2} (2,510/sq mi).

== Geography ==
Kothamangalam is situated in the eastern part of the Ernakulam district. According to the division of the geographical regions of Kerala, Kothamangalam is in a mid-land region. The general topography is hilly.

The Periyar, the largest river in Kerala, flows through the taluk. There are dams built across the Periyar at Edamalayar, Lower Periyar, and Bhoothathankettu for hydroelectricity generation and irrigation purposes. The current Kothamangalam region was historically known as Malakhachira (മാലാഖച്ചിറ). Kothamangalamar, a small river which flows through the town joins Kaliyar and Thodupuzhayar to form the Muvattupuzhayar, which is the second largest river in Ernakulam.

Neighboring cities & towns

== Demographics ==
Religions in Kothamangalam(2011)
Religion	Percent(%)
Christian	57.50%
Hindu	33.29%
Muslim	8.91%
Sikh	0.01%
Buddhist	0.01%
Jain	0.01%
Not stated	0.12%
No Religion	0.15%

According to the 2011 census of India, Kothamangalam had a total population of 38,837, 19,029 being males and 19,808 females. There are 30,067 households in the Kothamangalam municipality. The literacy rate of Kothamangalam Agglomeration is 95.24%, in comparison to the national urban average literacy in India of 85%. The literacy rate of males and females were 97.04% and 93.48% respectively. There were 98,398 who were literate, of which 49,412 were males and the remaining 48,986 were females.

== Administration ==
The Kothamangalam municipality was formed in 1978 and is the headquarters of the taluk. The municipality has an area of 40.04 km^{2} (15.46 sq mi) and is divided into 31 electoral wards. Elections to the local self bodies are held once every five years. From the elected municipal councilors, a chairman and vice-chairman are elected.

Kothamangalam is part of the Idukki Lok Sabha constituency; until 2009, it was part of Muvattupuzha Lok Sabha constituency. Kothamangalam is also represented in the Kerala Legislative Assembly as a constituency. The panchayats in Kothamangalam Taluk are Nellikuzhi, Kottapady, Pindimana, Varapetty, Pallarimangalam, Pothanikkad, Paingottoor, Kavalangad, Keerampara, Vadattupara, Kuttampuzha, and Edamalakkudy.

== Education ==
- Mar Athanasius College of Engineering
- Greenvalley Public School
- Indira Gandhi Institute of Engineering and Technology
- Bharath Open School, NIOS Study Centre Muvattupuzha

== Religious pilgrimages ==
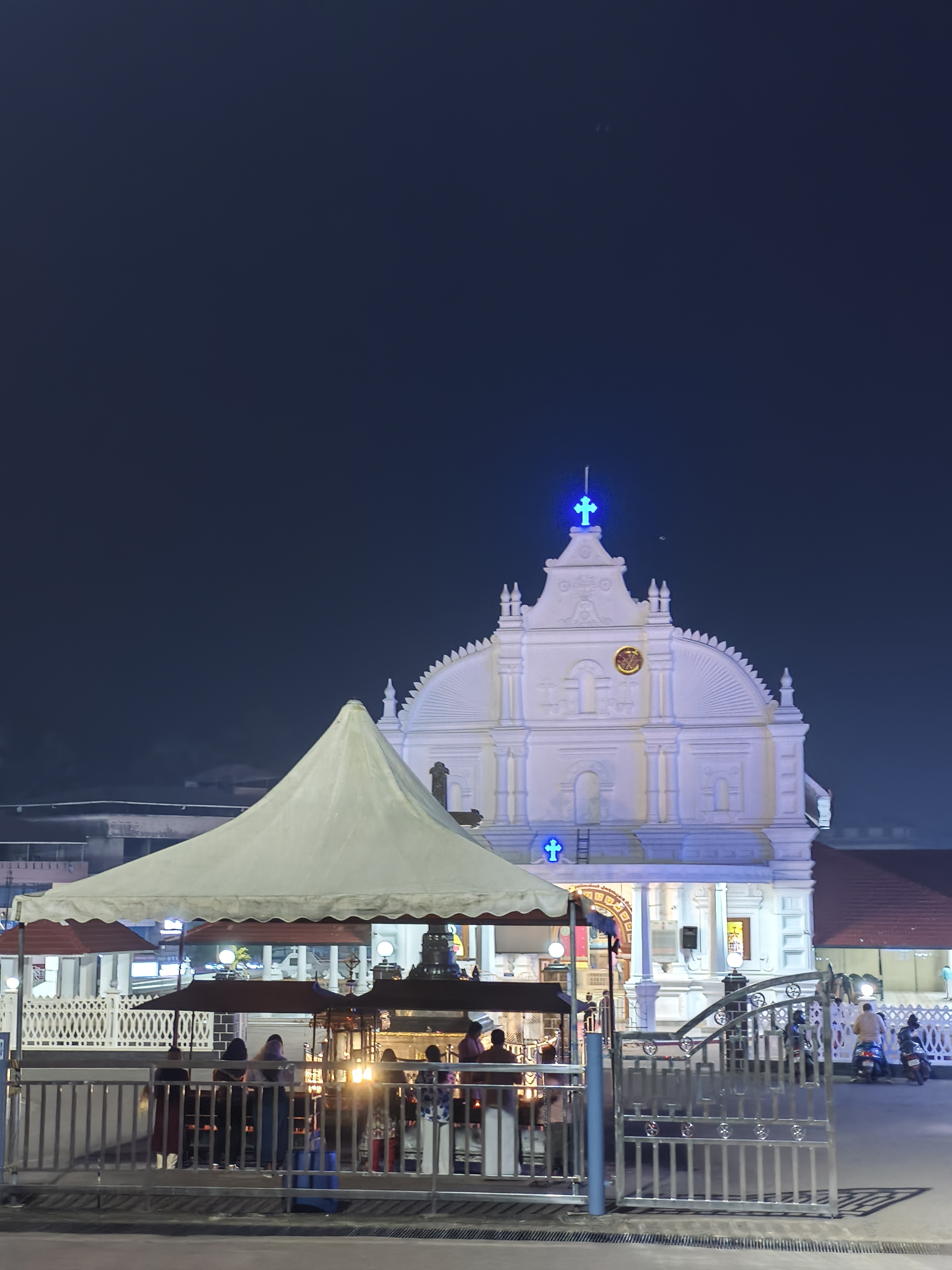
Night View of Marthoman Cheriya Pally, Kothamangalam

=== Churches ===
- Marth Mariyam Jacobite Syrian Sonoroo Cathedral Great Church
- Mar Thoma Jacobite Syrian Orthadox Cheriapally

=== Temples ===
- Thalakodu Sree Krishna Temple

== Reachability ==
=== By Road ===
1. Kochi - Kolenchery - Muvattupuzha (53 km)
2. Angamaly - Kalady - Perumbavoor (34 km)
3. Aluva - Perumbavoor (35 km)
4. Munnar - Anachal - Adimali - Neriamangalam - Oonukal (73 km)
5. Kottayam - Ettumanoor - Kuravilangad - Muvattupuzha (68 km)
6. Thodupuzha - Kumaramangalam - Paingottor (29 km)
7. Vagamon - Thodupuzha - Muvattupuzha (69 km)

== Gallery ==
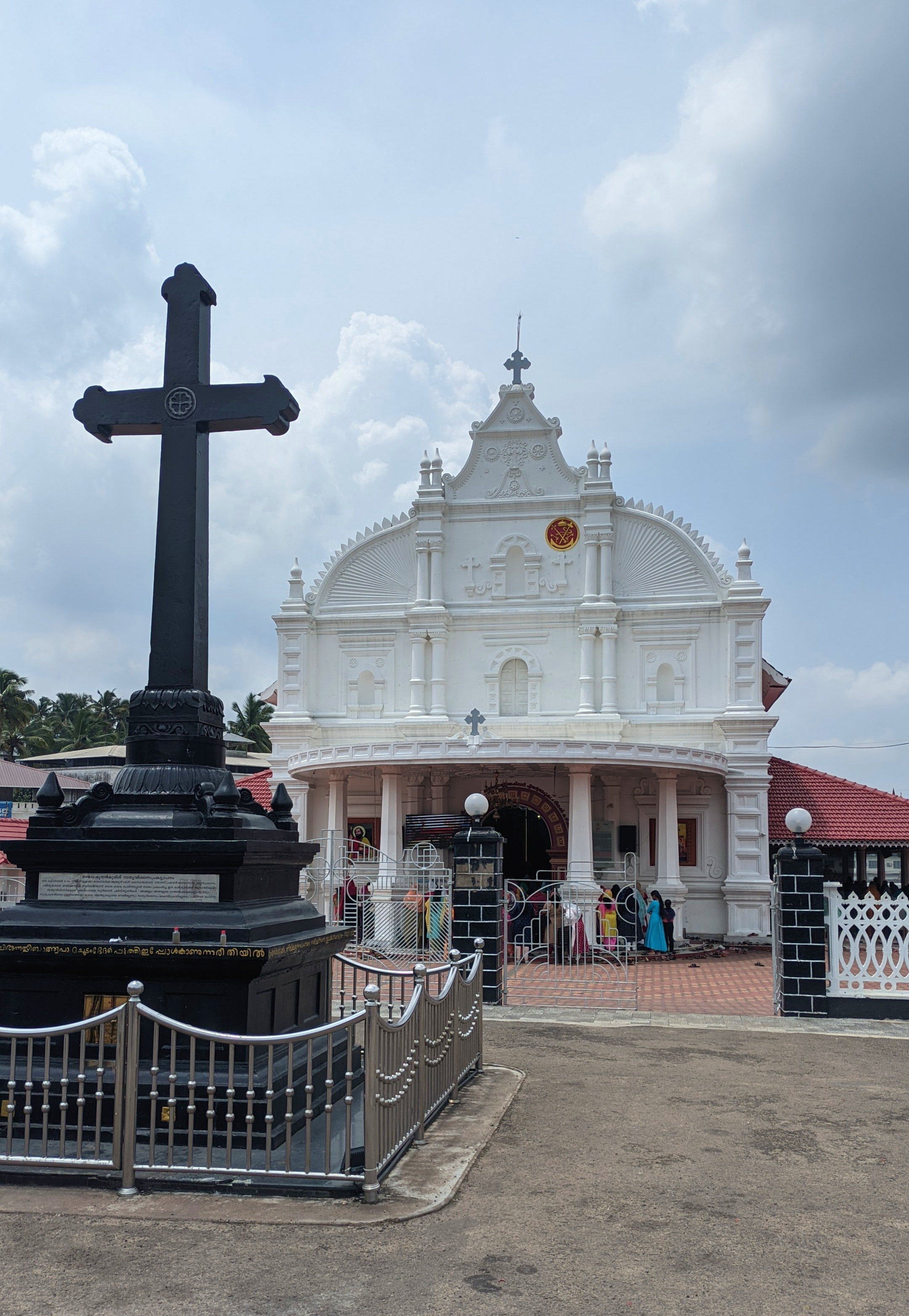
Mar Thoma Jacobite Syrian Cheriapally, is a Jacobite Church Situated in the Centre of the City of Kothamangalam

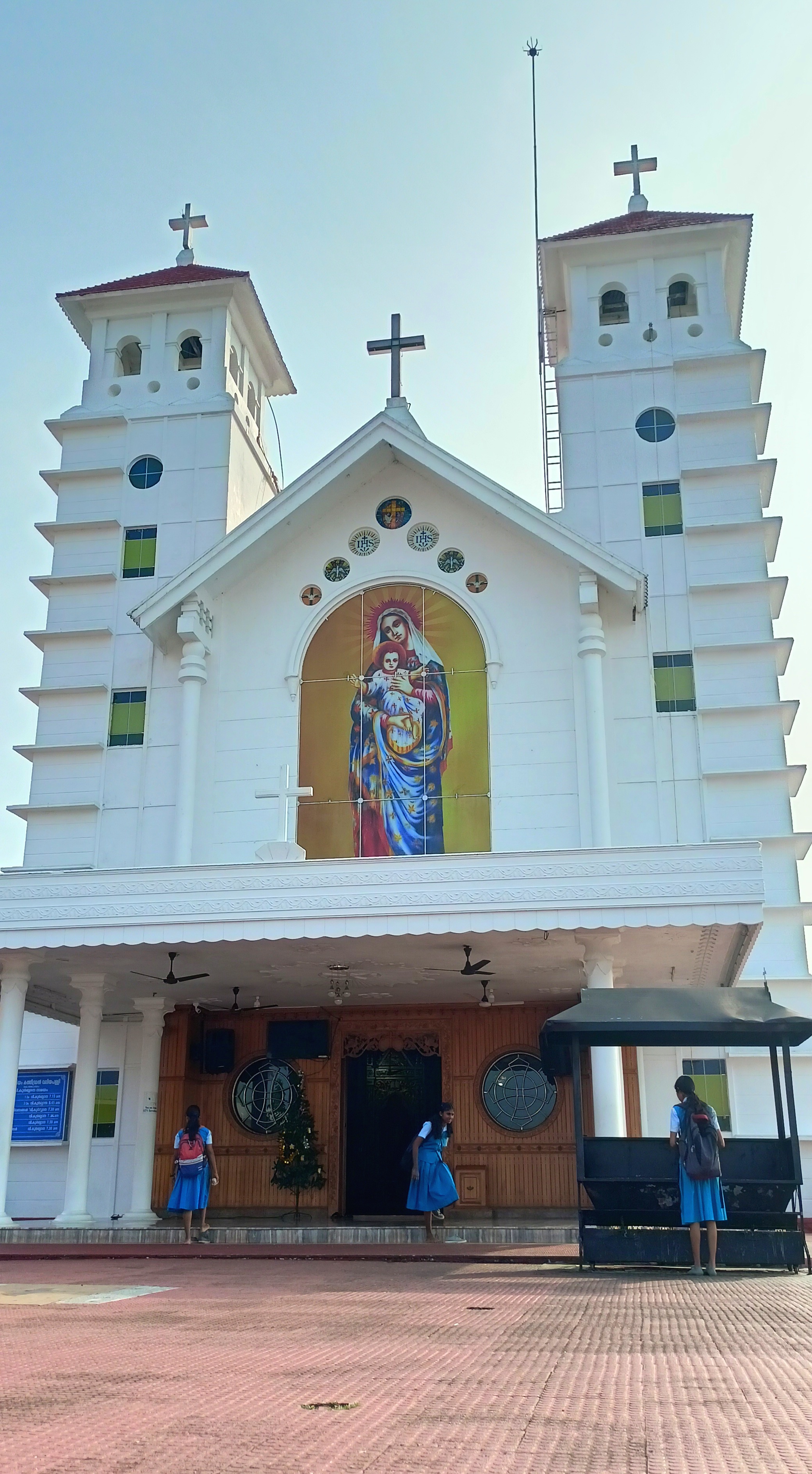
Marth Mariyam Jacobite Syrian Sonoroo Cathedral Great Church, is a Jacobite Church Situated in the Centre of the City of Kothamangalam

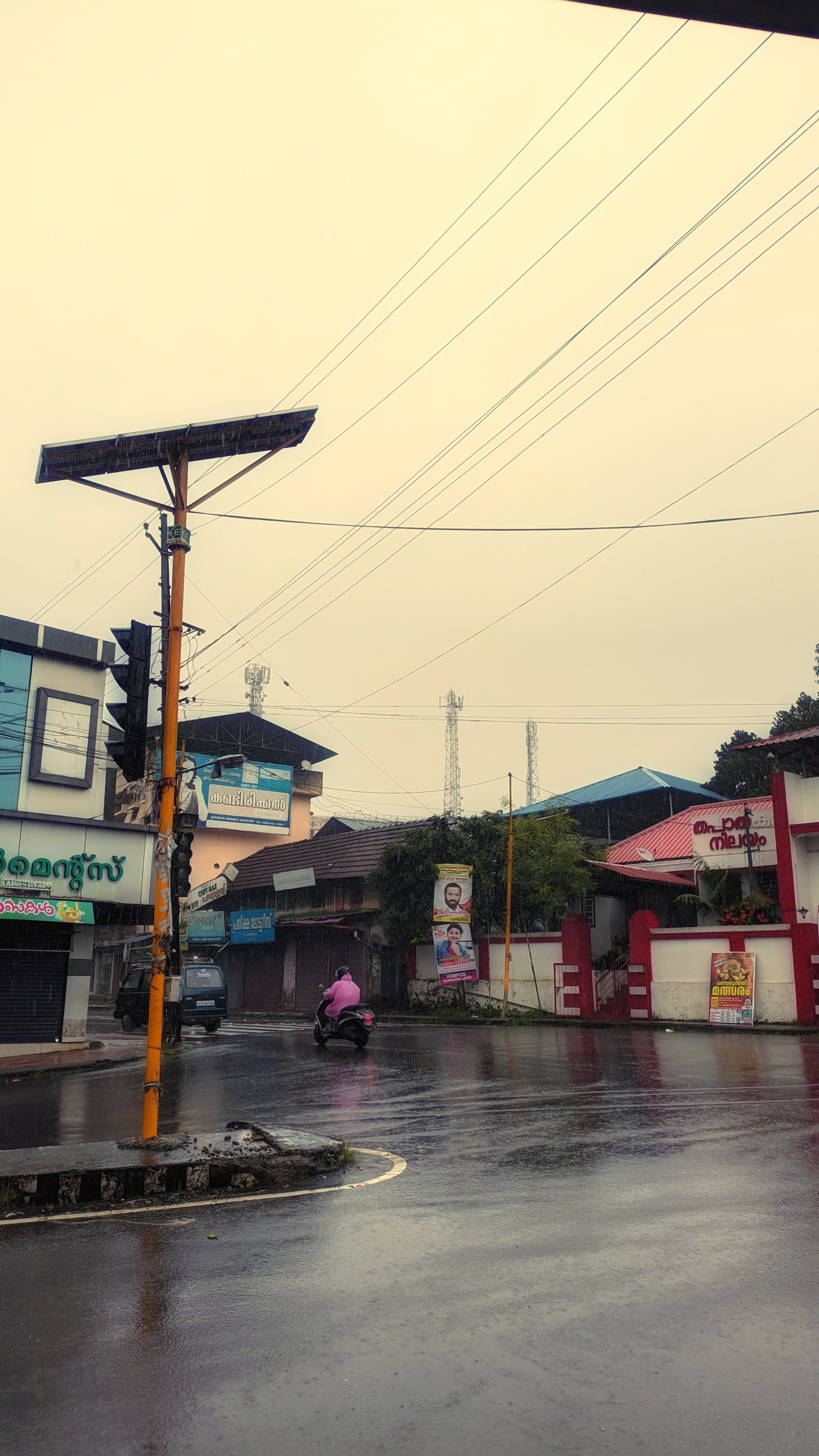
Rainy Evening in the city Of Kothamangalam in the month of June

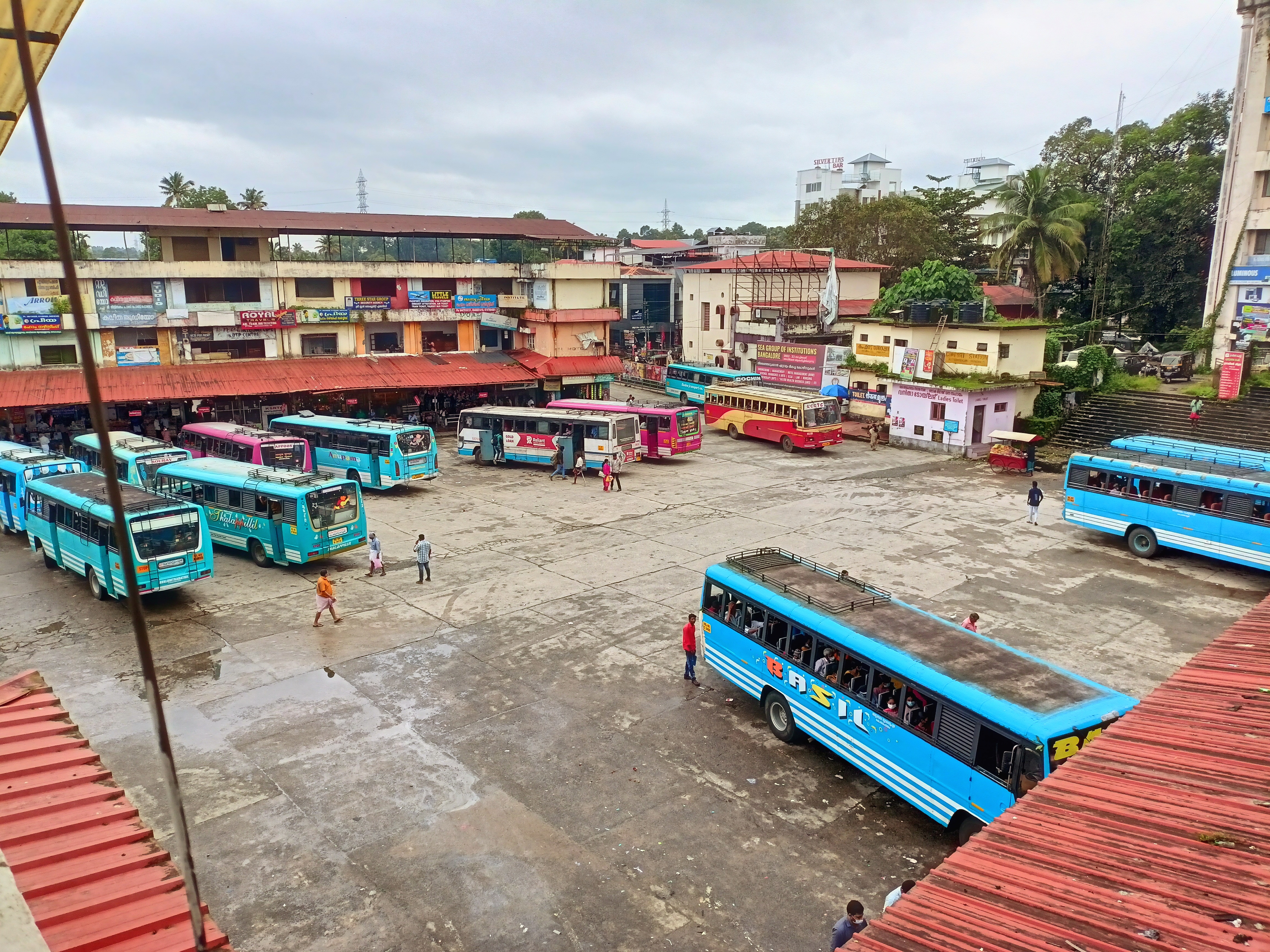
Aerial view of kothamangalam Private Bus Stand on an Evening

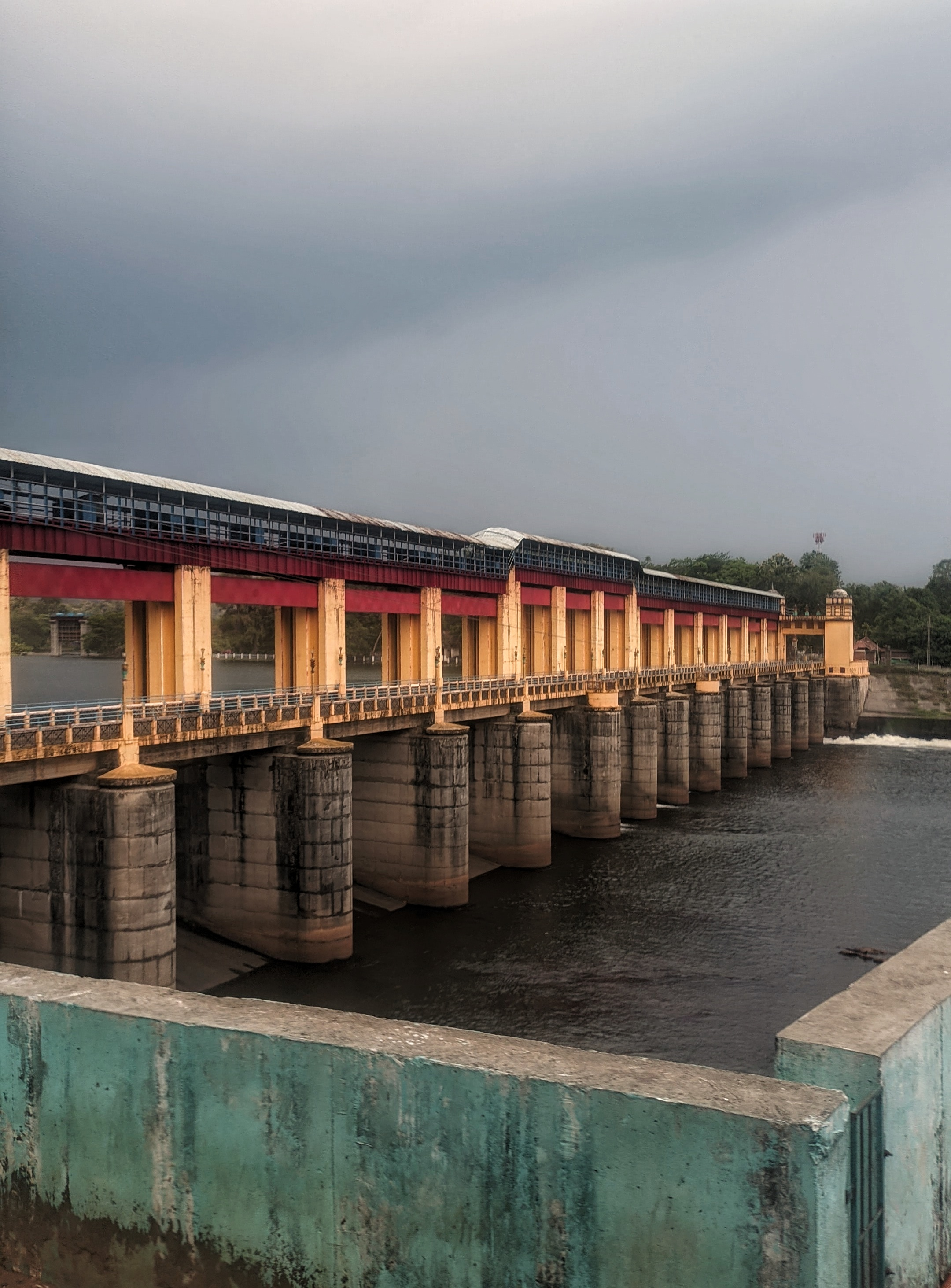
Bhoothathankettu Dam on a Rainy Evening

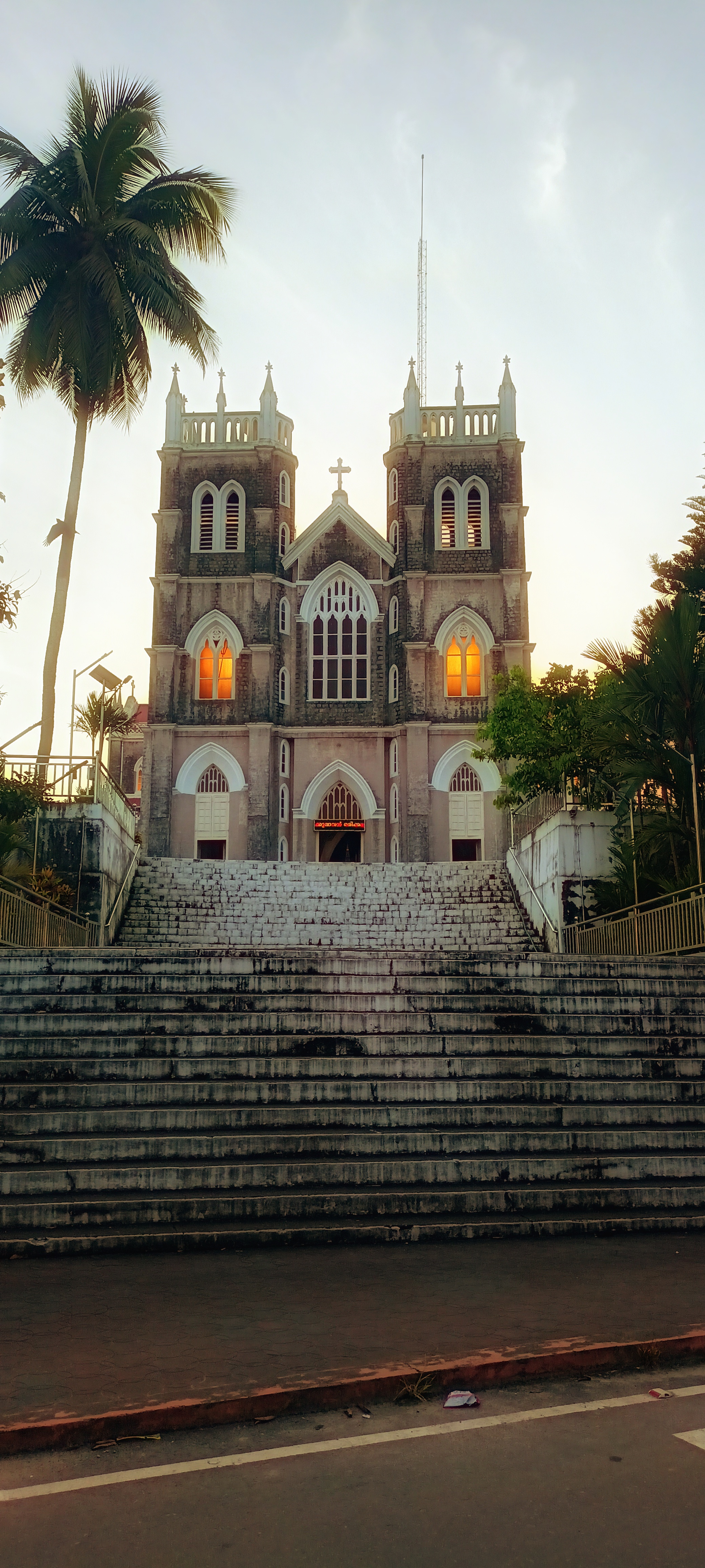
St. George's Cathedral, is a Catholic church in the Centre of Kothamangalam City

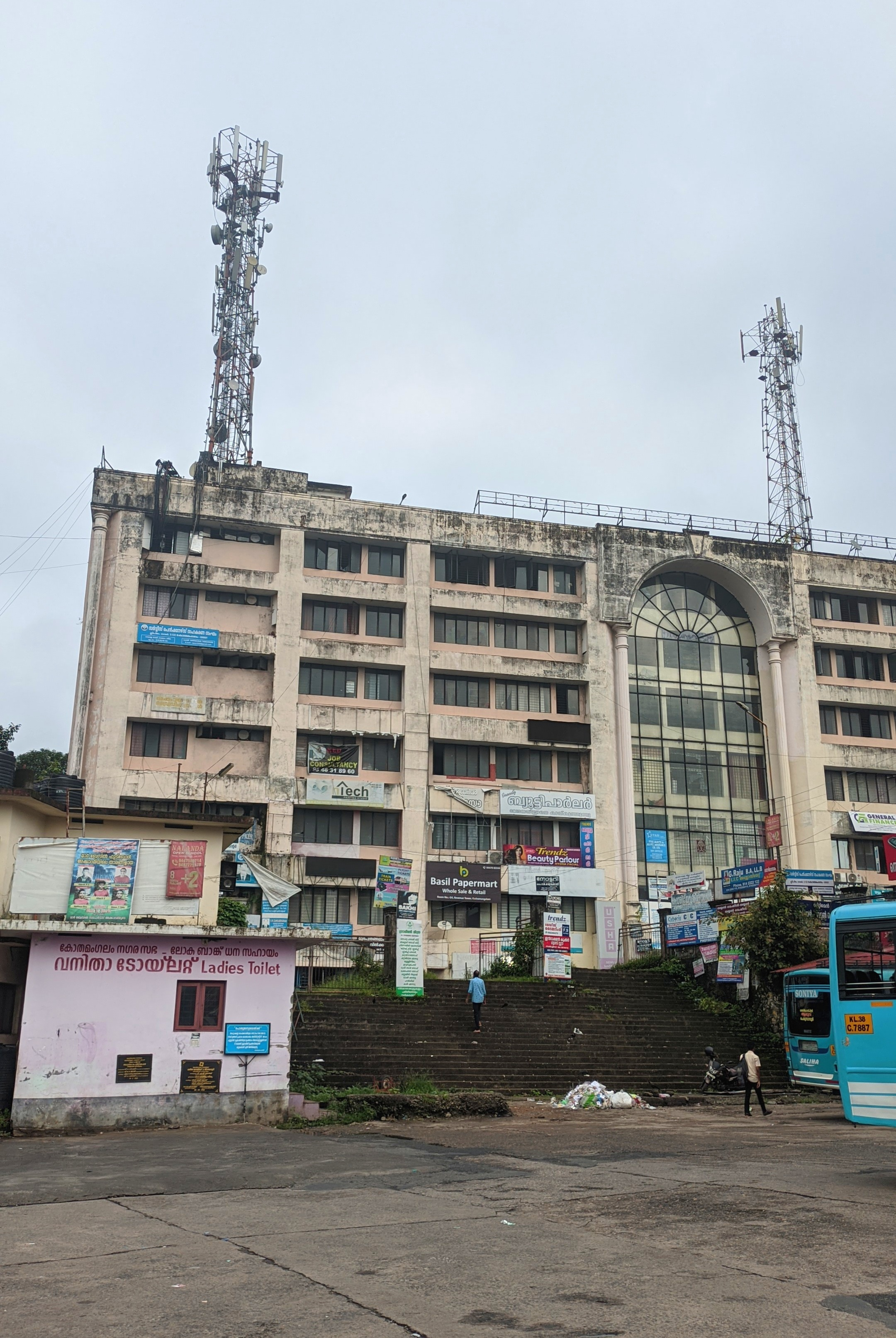
Revenue Tower of Kothamangalam Near the Private Bus Stand

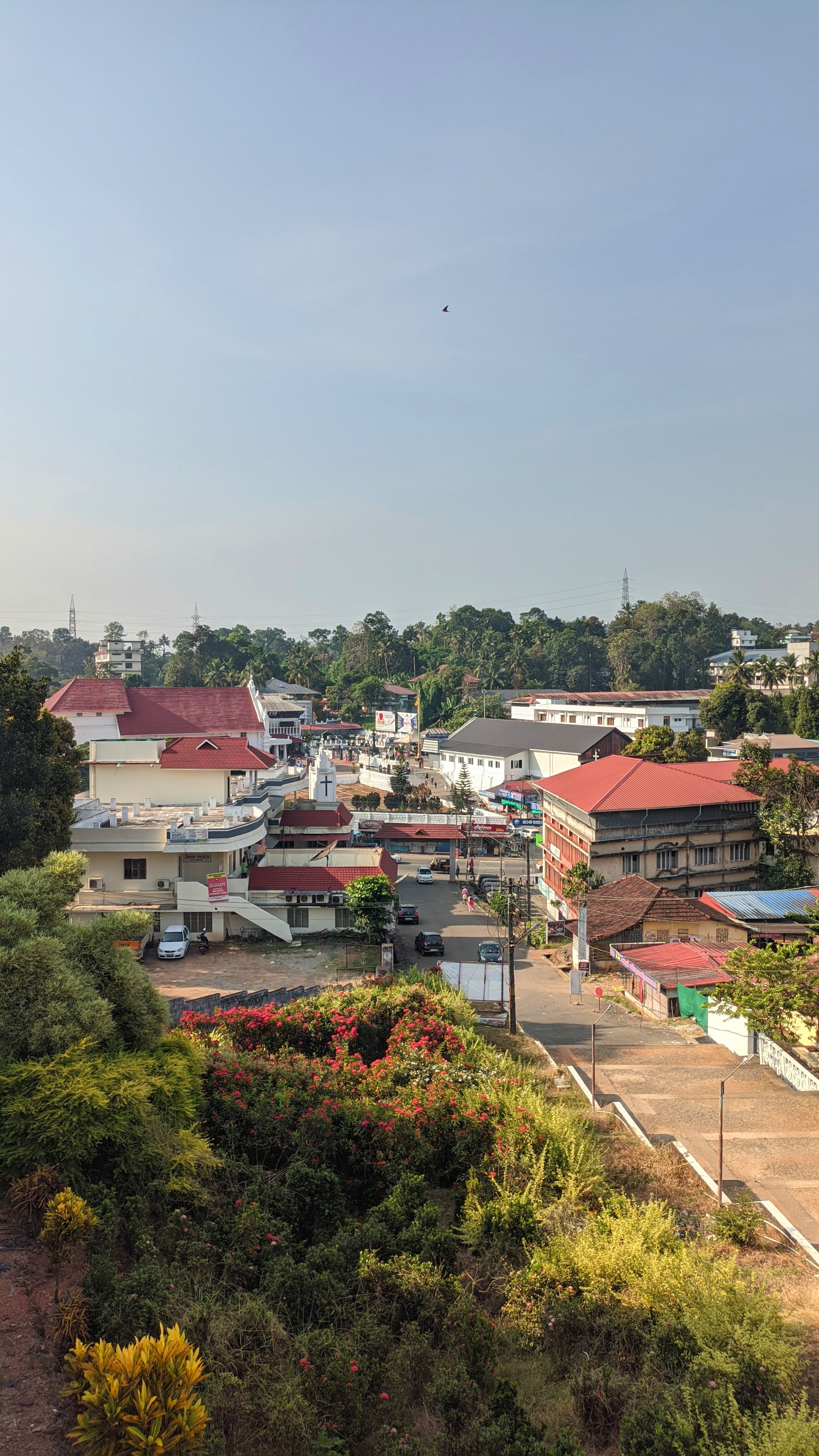
Aerial view of kothamangalam Cheriya palli

== Villages ==
- Chathamattam
- Nellikuzhi
- Keerampara
- Kottappady
- Kuttampuzha
- Neriamangalam
- Pindimana
- Pothanikkad
- Thrikkariyoor
- Varappetty
- Venduvazhy
