= Nellikuzhi =

Village in Ernakulam District, Kerala, India

Coordinates: 10°05′N 76°35′E

Nellikuzhi is a Grama panchayat in Kothamangalam Taluk, Ernakulam district, Kerala, situated on the Aluva-Munnar State Highway. Nellikuzhi is famous for its furniture business. There are hundreds of furniture showrooms and thousands of production units. Nellikuzhi caters the main demand of hardwood furniture in South India. It covers an area of 27.62 square kilometres (10.66 sq mi), and is a suburban area of Kothamangalam town, situated 3.5 km away. Muvattupuzha and Perumbavoor towns are situated 15 km away from Nellikuzhy. Nellikuzhi is the hometown of Sri T. M. Meethian, Ex-MLA of Kothamangalam, a mediator in Kothamangalam Taluk.

== Demographics ==
As of 2001, its total population was 29,593, for a density of 1,071 inhabitants per square kilometre (2,770/sq mi). There were 14,932 males and 14,661 females. The literacy rate was 86.61%.

== History ==
The first Iramalloor Village unit was formed in 1946, covering the Panchayat area as part of old Travancore under Muvattupuzha Taluk before formation of Travancore-Cochin state in 1949. Nellikuzhi Panchayat was formed in 1953 and was divided into two villages in 1988 as Iramalloor and Thrikkariyoor.

According to the available historical evidence, Kothamangalam was a place of prominence during the rule of the First Chera Dynasty, the dynasty that ruled Kothamangalam from around 300 BC to the first millennium. Cheras was also known as Kothai. The capital of the Chera kingdom was Karur. This led historians such as Professor Joseph Mundasseri and Kanakasabhato to claim that Thrikkariyoor, a village 3 km north of Kothamangalam, could have been the ancient capital of Cheras. However, this claim did not receive wide support.

It is believed that until the 8th century followers of Lord Buddha lived in Nellikuzhi area.

There was an old rajapatha (road) between Thrikkariyoor and Thrikkakara called Pezhakkapilli road in the olden days.

== Economy ==
Nellikuzhi is a prominent furniture market in Central Kerala, attracting workers from across India. It is an important educational centre in Kerala, too.

== Educational institutions ==
Nellikuzhi Grama Panchayat hosts several professional institutions, including an engineering college, dental college, and ayurveda college.

- Indira Gandhi Engineering College
- Indira Gandhi College of Arts and Sciences
- Indira Gandhi Dental College
- Indira Gandhi Training College B.Ed.
- Indira Gandhi Training Institute T.T.C
- Nangelil Ayurveda Medical College
- Mar Baselios Dental College
- Mar Baselios College of Nursing
- Green Valley Public School
- Nellikuzhi Govt. High School
- Al-Amal Public School
- Blossom international Residential school
- GHSS CHERUVATTOOR
- GUPS KUTTILAHNJI
- NECT PUBLIC SCHOOL
