= Pindimana =

Village in Kerala, India

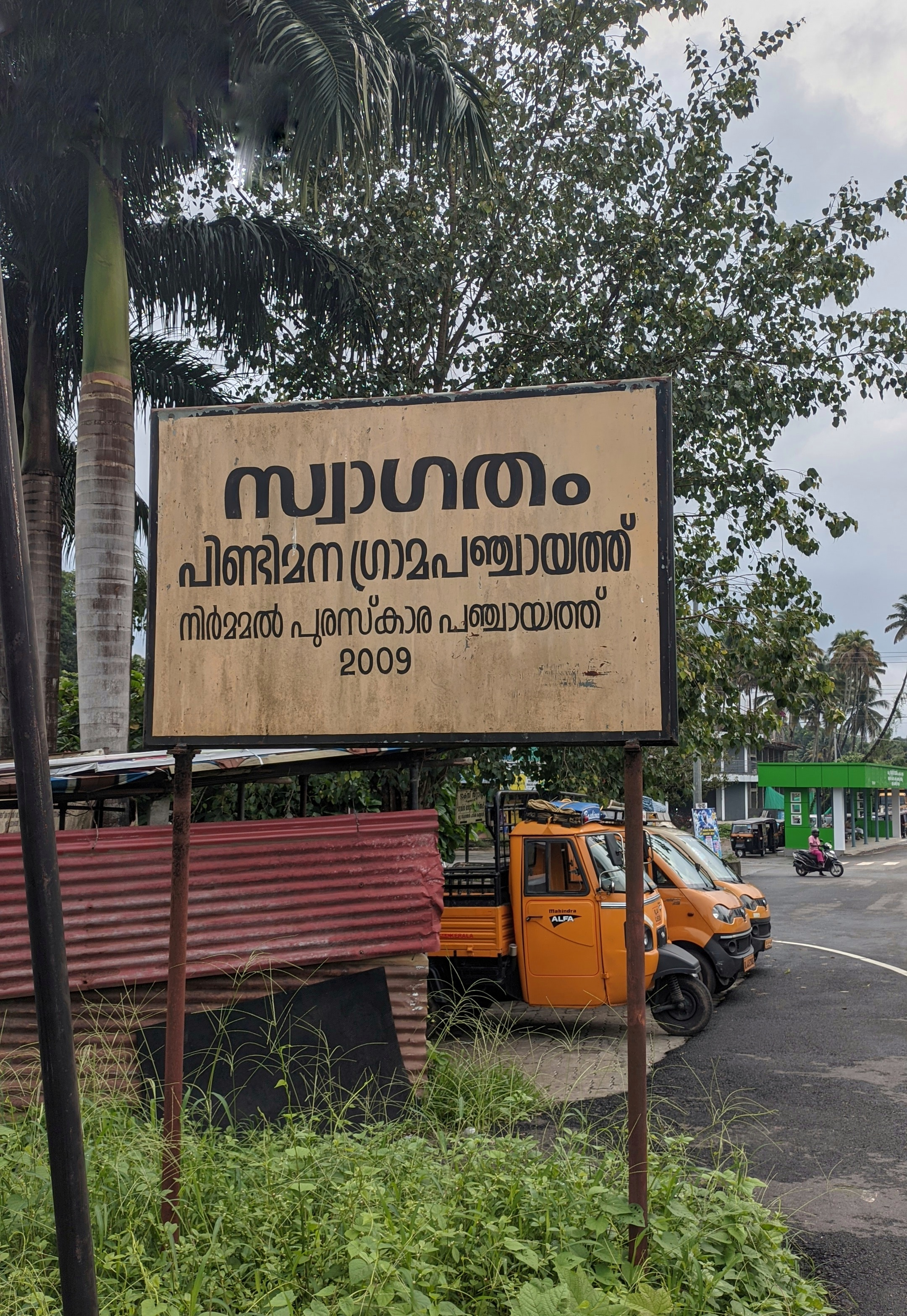
The Welcome Pindimana

Pindimana is a village in Ernakulam district in the Indian state of Kerala.

The late ex-MLA M. I. Markose hailed from this village. It is believed that the name Pindimana is derived from the name of an ancient 'Brahmin family.' Thrikkariyoor, which was an important town in ancient times, is the nearby city. Its temple is one of the 108 Shiva temples.

== Demographics ==
As of 2011 India census, Pindimana had a population of 12516 with 6286 males and 6230 females.
