= Thrikkariyoor =

- village
- Location in Kerala, India Thrikkariyoor (India)
- Coordinates: 10°4′0″N 76°37′0″E
- Country: India
- State: Kerala
- District: Ernakulam

Government
  - Type: Panchayati raj (India)
  - Body: Gram panchayat

Population (2011)
  - Total: 15,746

Languages
  - Official: Malayalam, English
- Time zone: UTC+5:30 (IST)
- PIN: 686692

Thrikkariyoor is a village located in the Nellikuzhi panchayat of Ernakulam district in the Indian state of Kerala. The Thrikkariyoor Mahadeva Temple is located near the village.

== Demographics ==
As of 2011 India census, Thrikkariyoor had a population of 15746 with 7721 males and 8025 females.
