= Pothupara =

- Town
- Location in Kerala, India Pothupara (India)
- Coordinates: 9°57′50″N 77°6′0″E
- Country: India
- State: Kerala
- District: Idukki

Languages
  - Official: Malayalam, English
- Time zone: UTC+5:30 (IST)
- PIN: 685565
- Telephone code: 914865-265/263
- Lok Sabha constituency: Idukki
- Vidhan Sabha constituency: Devikulam

Pothupara is a place in Idukki district in the Indian state of Kerala situated in the Western Ghats. Pothupara is 9 km from Rajakkad, 4 km from Kunchithanny, 17 km from Munnar and 2 km from Ellakkal

Pothupara Is Situated in Kunchithanny Village . St. Alphonsa church is The main Religious Center in this Place.
