= Parathode =

- Town
- Location in Kerala, India Parathode (India)
- Coordinates: 9.939669°N 77.030193°E
- Country: India
- State: Kerala
- District: Idukki

Government
  - Body: Konnathady Panchayat

Area
  - Total: 56.63 km^{2} (21.86 sq mi)

Population
  - Total: 20,417
  - Density: 360.5/km^{2} (933.8/sq mi)

Languages
  - Official: Malayalam, English
- Time zone: UTC+5:30 (IST)
- PIN: 685571
- Telephone code: 91-4868-
- Vehicle registration: KL-06
- Nearest city: Adimali
- Lok Sabha constituency: Idukki
- Civic agency: Konnathady Panchayat
- Climate: COOL (Köppen)

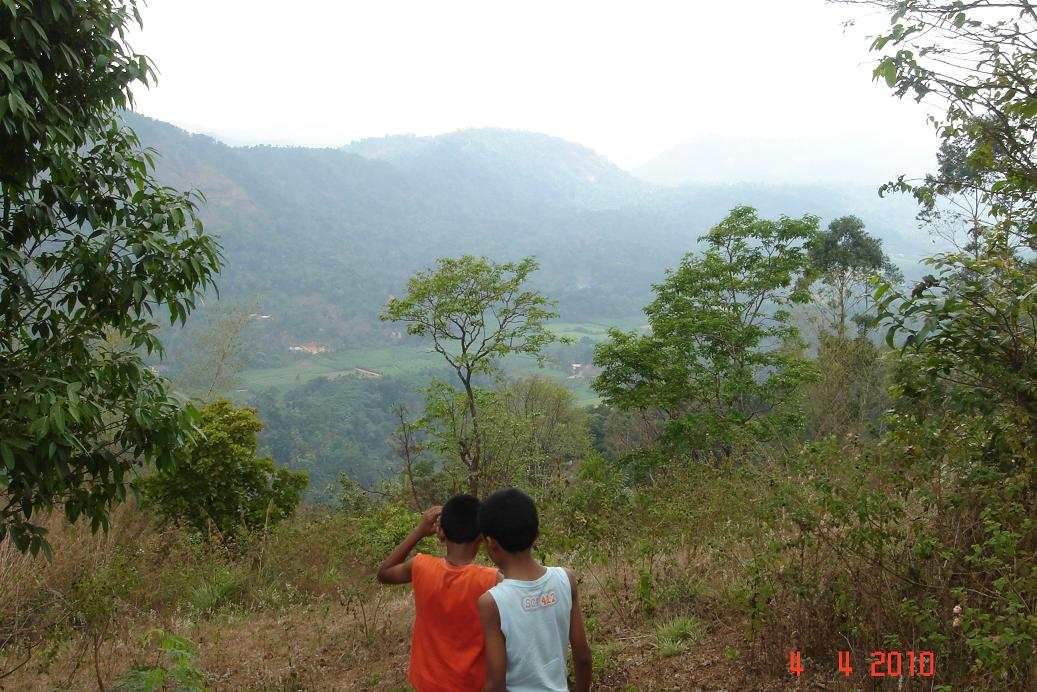
A scenic shot of the hills overlooking Parathode-idukki, Kerala

Parathode is a town located in the Idukki district in the Indian state of Kerala. This town is in Konnathady village, which is located in a valley surrounded by hills. The town's name originates from the Malayalam words "para" (rock) and "thode" (small river or creek). The valley is split by a river, which has an abundance of archaeological evidence from Neolithic civilizations. Burial urns, swords, pottery, and other artifacts have been unearthed and suggest that an ancient civilization once lived there.

== Location ==
Parathode, is 18 km from Adimali. Bus services runs from Adimali through Kallarkutty. It is 20 km from Nedumkandam. The places like Pullukandom, Chinnarnirappu, Kombodinjal, Panikkankudi, Kambilikandom, Muniyara and Konnathadi are nearby.

== Education ==
- Sree Narayana College of Arts & Science, established in 2013.
- St. George's Higher Secondary School. This school was established in 1960 is a well known establishment throughout Idukki district.

The school has provided free education to residents of the High Range since the early period of migration to the area. Its alumni include athletes who have competed at the national level. The school sought approval to offer an aided higher secondary (Plus Two) programme, but the request was denied on infrastructure grounds. Although its infrastructure and facilities have since been improved, approval for the programme has not been granted.

== Religious facilities ==
- Sree Dharma Sastha Temple.
- St. George Forane Church, under the Idukki Diocese of Syro Malabar Church.
- Sri Siva Parvathi temple.

== Economy ==
Services include a head post office, telephone exchange, several banks, Milma society, Akshaya Centre, a veterinary hospital, Family Health Centre, supermarket, K.M. Beenamol Stadium, an open market, transportation facility and a public library.

== Notables ==
- Olympian Ms. K.M. Beenamol attended St. George High School
- P. T. Thomas, former Member of the Legislative Assembly from Thrikkakkara and a veteran leader of the Indian National Congress, as well as a former Member of Parliament from the Idukki constituency was an alumnus of St. George High School

== Chinnarnirappu ==
Chinnarnirappu is a hilly area roughly 3.5 km outside Parathode. Chinnarnirappu is believed to be blessed because of the presence of a St. Thomas shrine.

== Nearby Places ==
- Chinnarnirappu
- Munnar
- Kambilikandam
- Thellithode
- Mukkudam
- Painavu
- Murickassery
- Pullukandam
- Panickankudy
- Vellathooval
- Thopramkudy
- Poothali
