= Ellakkal =

Ellakkal Ellakal, Ellackal, Ellakkall
- Village
- Interactive map of Ellakkal
- Coordinates: 9.999370899999999°N 77.06564860000003°E
- Country: India
- State: Kerala
- District: Idukki
- Block: Adimali

Area
  - Total: 272 km^{2} (105 sq mi)
- Elevation: 732 m (2,402 ft)

Languages
  - Official: Malayalam, English
- Time zone: UTC+5:30 (IST)
- PIN: 685565
- Telephone code: 914865-265/263
- Lok Sabha constituency: Idukki
- Vidhan Sabha constituency: Devikulam

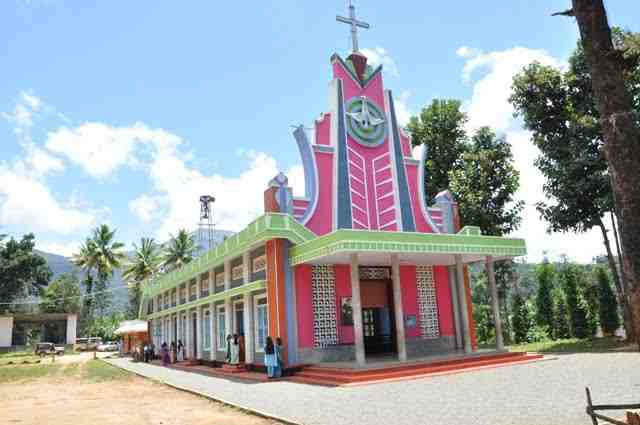
St.Antony's Church

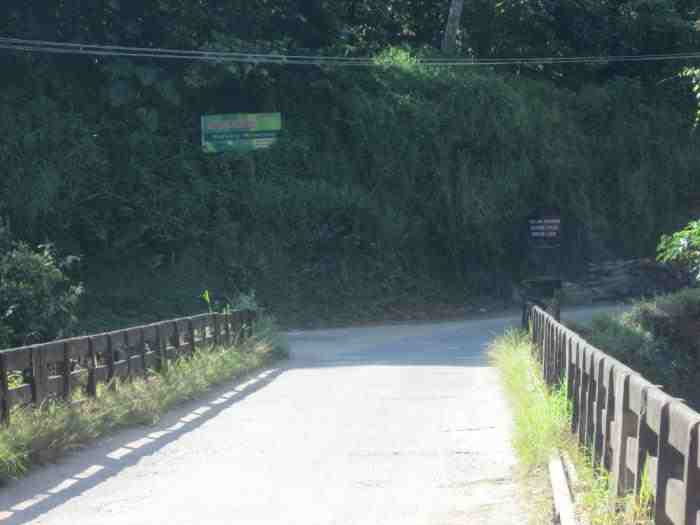
Ellakkal Bridge

Ellakkal is a habitation in the Idukki district of Kerala, India. Located in the Western Ghats, it is administered by Vellathooval panchayat, as a part of the Kunchithanny village.

It is located 7 km from Rajakkad, 1.8 km from Kunchithanny and 15 km from Munnar. The Kunchithanny-Rajakkad road passes through Ellakkal.

St. Antony's Church is the main religious centre here.
