= Pazhampillichal =

- Village
- Location in Kerala, India Pazhampillichal (India)
- Coordinates: 10.059969°N 76.833599°E
- Country: India
- State: Kerala
- District: Idukki
- Talukas: Devikulam
- Elevation: 517.245 m (1,697.00 ft)

Population (2001)
  - Total: 1,552

Languages
  - Official: Malayalam, English
- Time zone: UTC+5:30 (IST)
- PIN: 685561
- Telephone code: 04868

Pazhampillichal is a village in the High Range district Idukki of Kerala State, India. It is one of the far-flung forest fringe villages in the Munnar/Devikulam deciduous and evergreen forest, connecting from Aarammile (6th Mile) which is in between Adimaly - Neriamangalam on the Munnar – Cochin State Highway.

== History ==
In 1972, a few families from other early-settled Idukki towns and villages under the leadership of Sri, M.C. Kuttappan, Sri. Mathew, Sri. Maniyanattu Varghese (Kallippara Varghese) and Sri. C. K. Govindhan migrated to the forest, but the state forest officials ousted them. In 1974 they came again and settled, naming the possession of lands as Pazhampillichal. They were severely punished by legal authorities against the possession of forest land and many of them were jailed.

The migrant families were mainly from the backward communities like SCs and Cheramar Christians, which still continued, but not a PESA or such categorized area, for there are other classes or castes groups also settled here. Though Pazhampillichal was established earlier than the nearby or neighboring two villages Padikkappu and Mamalakandom, it had no school up to recent years and the post office is still Padikkappu only.

There are indications of the presence of early man's habitations or settlements in the area through the relics and vestiges found here.

The first migrant families including women and children suffered a lot due to many factors like torture from forest department officials, wild animals, and natural calamities and evacuation. Though other villages of the district got title deeds (Pattayas) to their procession of lands, Pazhampillichal families still wait for a title deed despite living here over 40 years.

In the past forty years, two landslides devastated the agricultural lands and infrastructure of Pazhampillichal, and killed 11 people in 1997.

== Etymology ==
This location gets its name, as many migrant elders conveyed, from an early family of settlers with the name "Pazhampilli". They were from a Muslim family who took the forest land on lease for cultivation. In order to have self-protection they shot an elephant, which died on the field itself. This incident brought them fear of officials jailed, so they fled the location. Later the name "Chaal" was added, which in Malayalam (local dialect) means a trench, watercourse or gully.

== Geography ==
Enchathotti Chain Bridge built across the River Periyar

Pazhampillichal is situated at an altitude of 1696.998 with coordinates of 10.059969"E and 76.833599"N’. It is a hilly aslant location only. The junction or headquarters is located at the center of households which are situated on the north west side of the hill. Starting from Chappath, elevation gradually increases towards the upper side of the hill followed by a road which goes to Padikkappu. The other sides of the hill are dense forest with animals like elephants, monkeys and kezha. Below this, household situated areas go down to a small stream and from there another mountain starts and its east side is also occupied by people. The other side of this hill is forest only. Thus Pazhampillichal is a copiously forest-fringe hamlet located between two hills separated by a small stream.

The two hilly mounds situated to the east and west with the forests and natural vegetation provide safety, water resources and fecundity for Pazhampillichal, but also pose threats in rainy seasons. More than other places in Idukki district, the village gets a teeming downpour. In winter the village also gets cold higher, due to the coverage of the forests.

== Road connectivity ==
The village is connected to other areas through one road only that is connected to the road that starts from 6th Mile (Aaram mile) situated on the Cochin-Munnar highway towards north having a distance of 5.00 kilometers. This same road further goes from the locality called Chappath (a part of Pazhampillichal) towards north east to the only village exists beyond Pazhampillichal in the forest called Mamalakandom at a distance of 7 kilometers and the road goes towards south in height facilitating transportation and connectivity for all the people and ends up at Padikkappu at a distance of 3 kilometers away. The highway is connected to Adimaly, Munnar, Devikulam towards south-west and to Neriamangalam, Muvattupuzha and Ernakulam-Cochin towards north-east crossing Kerala's biggest river, the Periyar, at a distance of 12 kilometers.

== Demographics ==
Per 2001 Census of India, there are 320 households with a total number of 1552 people. The majority of communities in the village belong to SC and Cheramar Christian with 60% of households and population; Syro-Malabar or RC families are 11%; ST households are 26%. Other communities make up the remaining 3%. Pazhampillichal has many small localities like Chappathu, Kambiline, Kurathikudi, Velliamparakudi, Chupam, Kollamkudi etc. with mostly ST families and population.

Though this is of backward communities and a remote settlement far-flung forest fringe village, Pazhampillichal has 100% literacy.

== Constituency ==
Pazhampillichal comes under Adimaly Gramapanchayath and Mannamkandom Village of Devikulam Taluk. The Parliament and Legislative Assembly constituency of Pazhampillichal are Idukki and Devikulam respectively. It is the first (1) ward in the Adimaly Gramapanchayath.

== Educational institutions ==
Earlier there was not any educational institution in Pazhampillichal, which might be due to the remoteness, reserve and less population of the village. Now it has a school under state government: Govt. LP School (1st Standard to 4th Standard).

Afterward, children receive education in Neriamangalom 15 km away), Eattam mile (8th Mile) (8 km by walking) or Adimaly (23 km).

== Worship and religious institutions ==
Since 1974, Sri, Lukose Mulavathukuzhi has worked in the village spreading gospel and conducting bible classes. He was a dedicated evangelist and the person who started prayers and support services in Pazhampillichal. In 1976 he established Vellassery Church here.

There are Hindu and Christian religious congregations and groups in this village. Christianity is the major religion in the village.

Christian There are a number of Christian churches and worship centers in Pazhampillichal. They are:

- St. Mary's Church (BVM Assum) (under Syro-Malabar or RC Denomination and Kothamangalom Eparchy)
- CMS Church (under the Church Mission Society, Anglican Episcopal Churches)
- CSI (under Church of South India)
- Marthoma Church
- Jacobite Church
- IPC Prayer Hall (under the Indian Pentecostal Churches)
- Manjadi Believers' Church (under Believers' Church, Manjadi, Tiruvalla)
- Seventh-day Adventist (under Seventh-day Adventists Missions)
- Global Mission Prayer Hall (under Global Mission Churches Ministry)
- New India Church
- Sharon Fellowship
- Emmanuel Church
- Independent Church

Hindu and related religions

- Prathyaksha Raksha Dhaiva Sabha (Under Poikayil Yohannan's Movements)
- Devi Temple (Chappathu Vana Durga)

== Income and livelihood ==
The mainstay income of this migratory village is from agriculture. Around 94% of families depend on agriculture for their income and livelihood. There is no other income generation option in this village like enterprises of high levels or micro-cottage industries etc. Though forests are nearby, no NTFP collection or such activities among the villagers.

The remaining 6% of families depend on agro-labour works. Since many of the agriculture-investment families are of marginal farming cultivators, they go for cutting and loading of paper-raw material "Eeta" in the forest in order to supplement their income.

There is active participation and implementation of the central Government Scheme facilitated by State Government under 100 days guarantee pattern; Mahatma Gandhi National Rural Employment Guarantee Scheme in Malayalam equivalent "Thozhilurappu Padhathi". Out of the total population 94% people have such job cards in this village.

== Languages ==
Malayalam, the popular and official governing vernacular language of Kerala is the etymological dialect of the people of Pazhampillichal. Some use English and Hindi as well.
