= Carmelagiri Elephant Park =

Coordinates: 10.0951656°N 77.0971215°E

Carmelagiri Elephant Park is a private park for elephant riding through the hilly paths of Munnar forest, a part of Kerala tourism, India.

== Overview ==
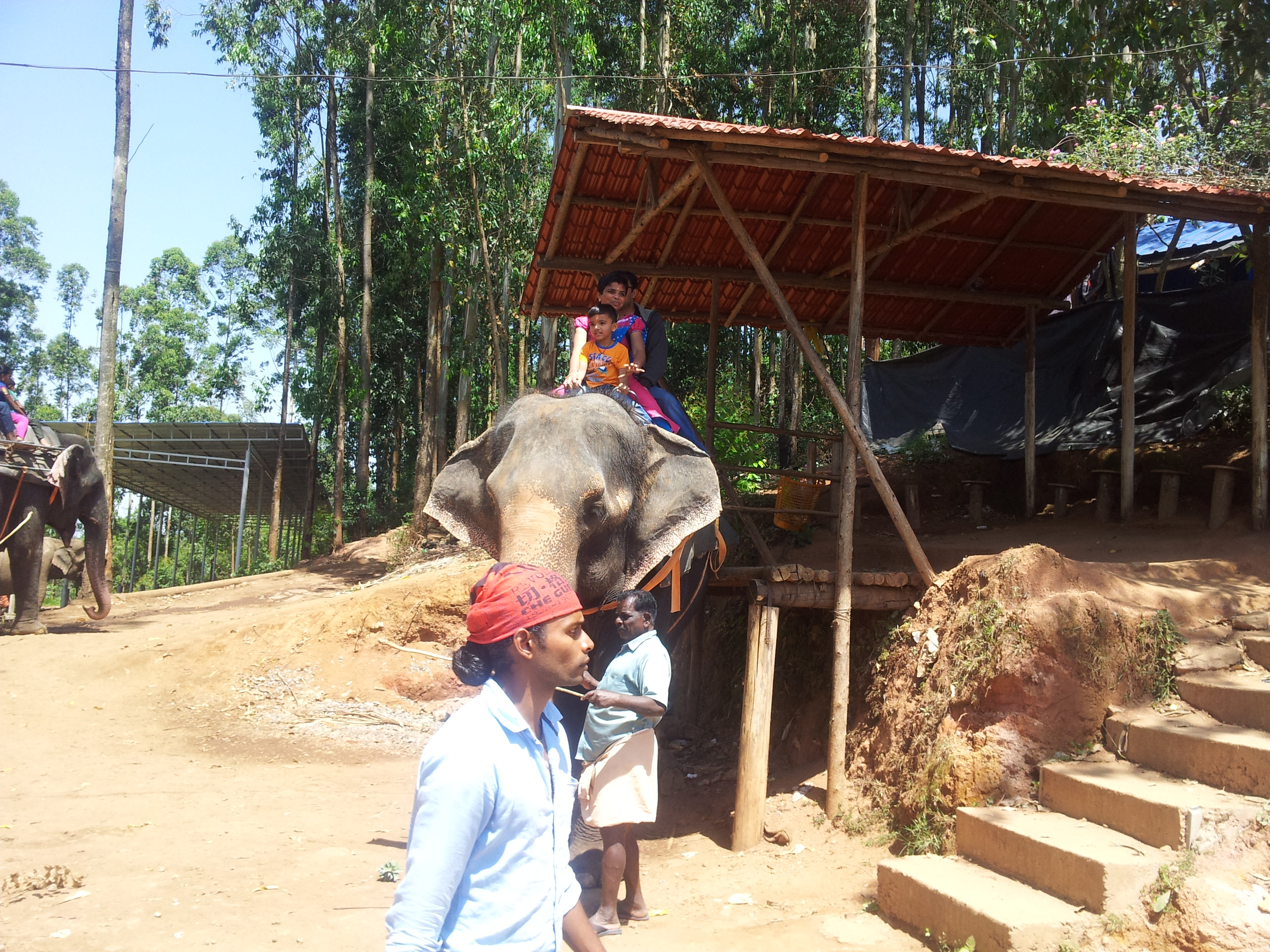
Ready to ride-from Carmelagiri Elephant Park

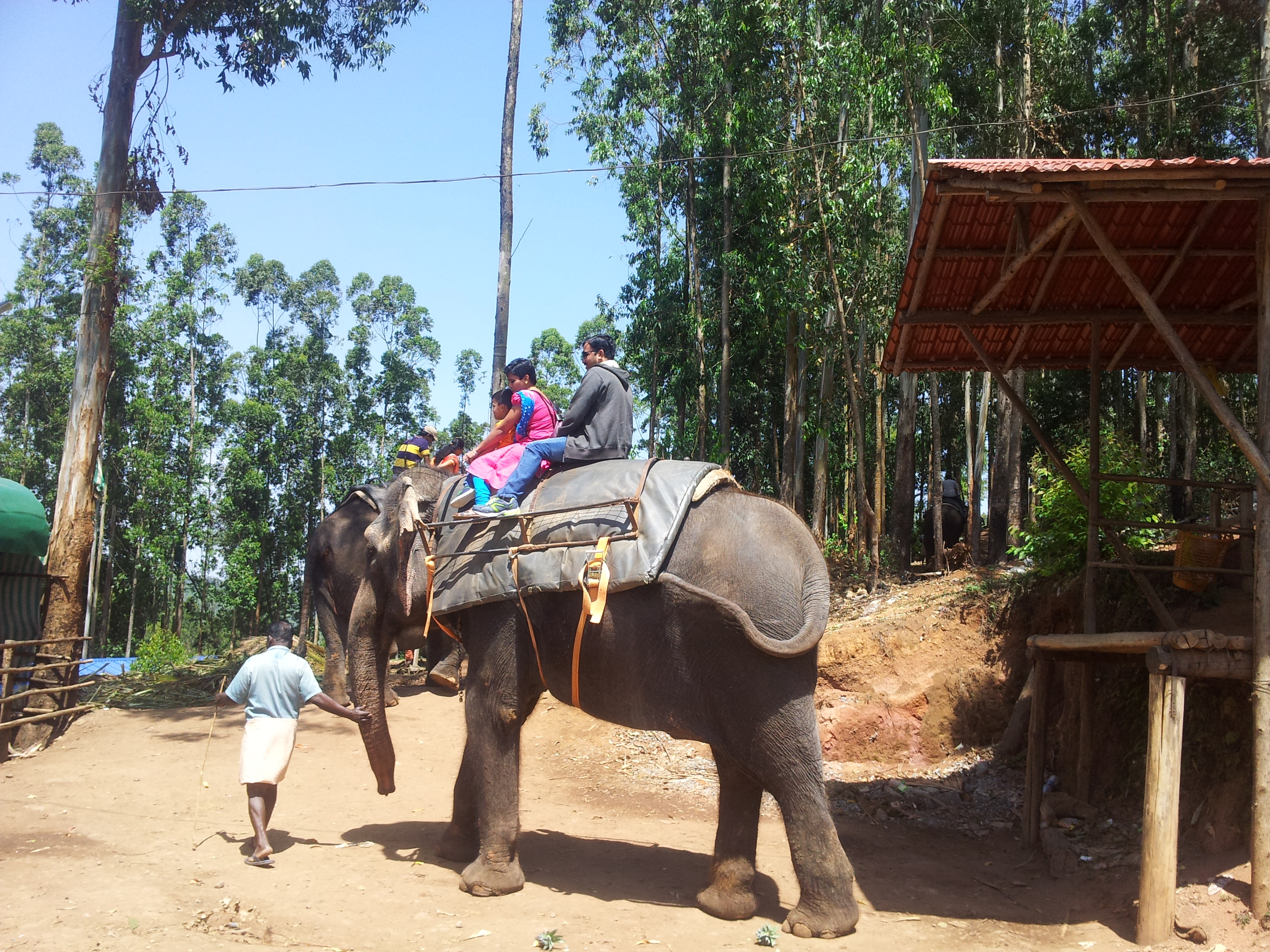
The ride starts-from Carmelagiri Elephant Park

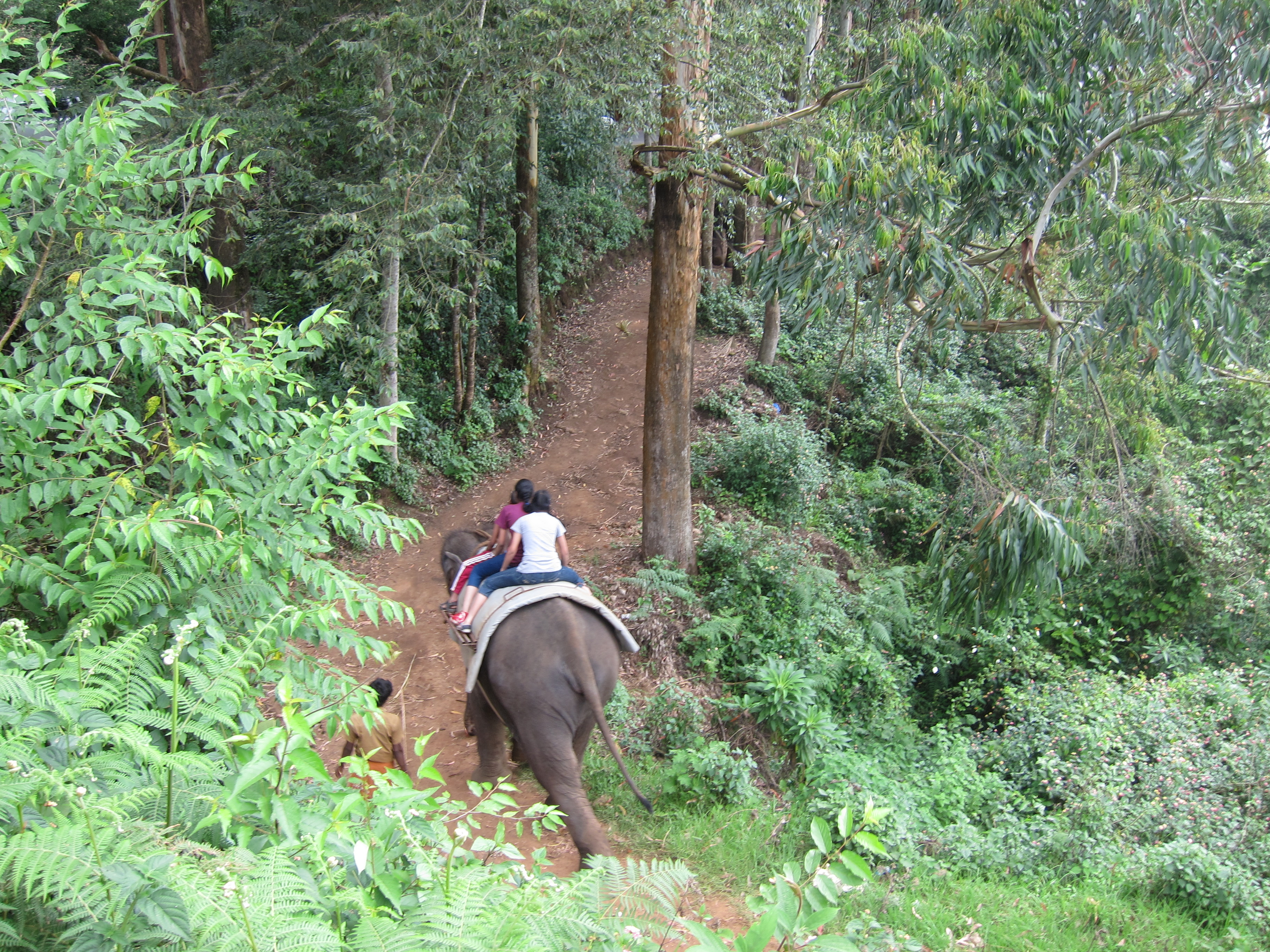
Elephant riding inside of Munnar forest

The park is located in Top Station, close to the city of Munnar in Kerala. The visitors get an experience of elephant ride and learn about multiple talents of the park’s elephants like demonstrations of commands, communication and timber pulling, elephant's bathe and can also participate in feeding one of the elephants. The park offers various tours, which range from excursions for 1 hour, a half day or a full day. There are many green hills, lush valleys, misty cloud-covered forests and sprawling tea plantations around the park and the park is open daily.
