= Cheeyappara Waterfalls =

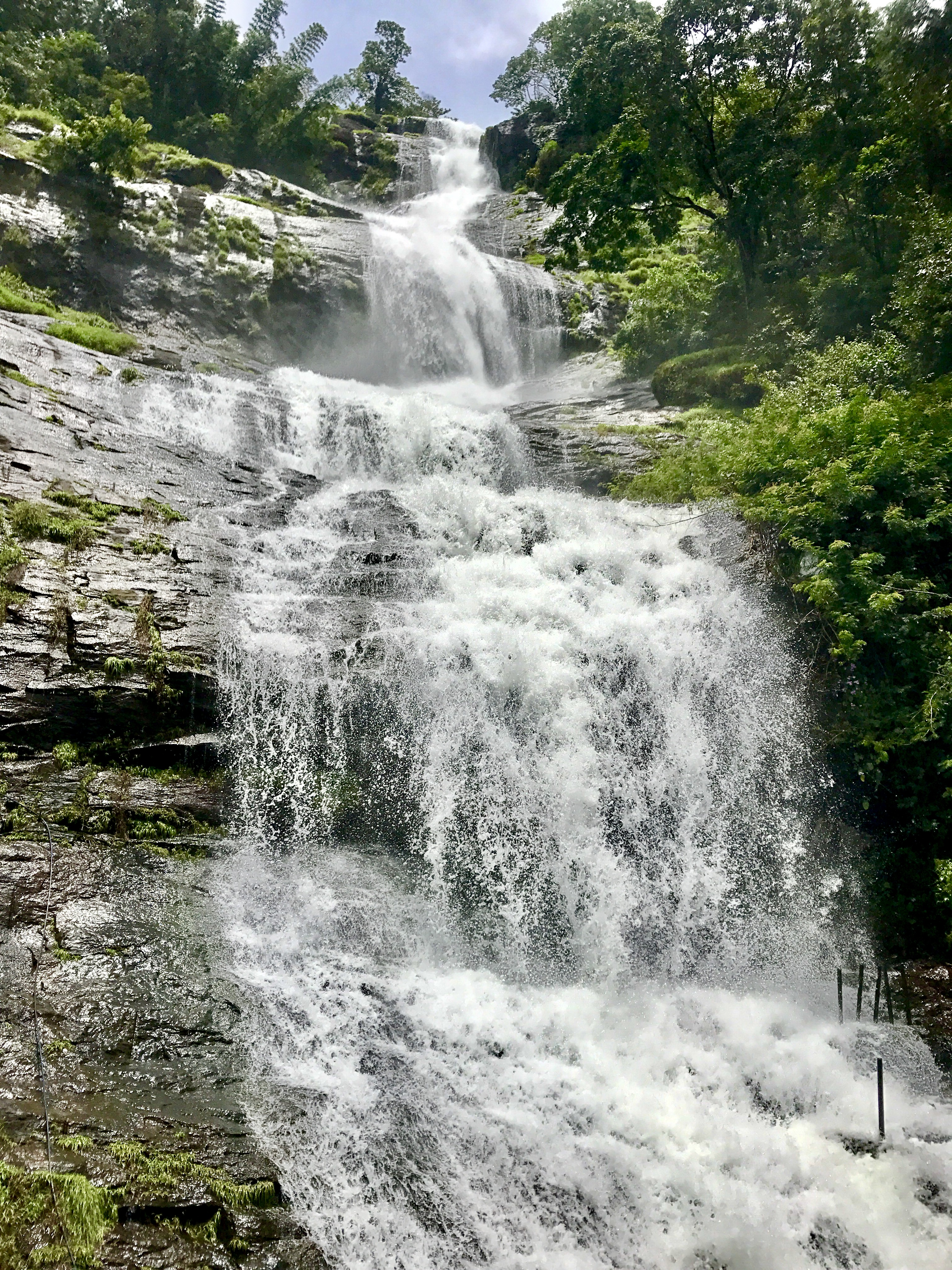
- Interactive map of Cheeyappara Waterfalls
- Location: Idukki district, Kerala, India
- Coordinates: 10.05403°N 76.82967°E
- Type: Tiered
- Total height: Not known
- Number of drops: 7
- Watercourse: Not known

The Cheeyappara Waterfalls is a waterfall in the Idukki district, Kerala, India. It is located alongside the National Highway 85, between Neriamangalam and Adimali.

The Cheeyappara Waterfalls cascades down in seven steps. It is also reachable via trekking and hiking trails.

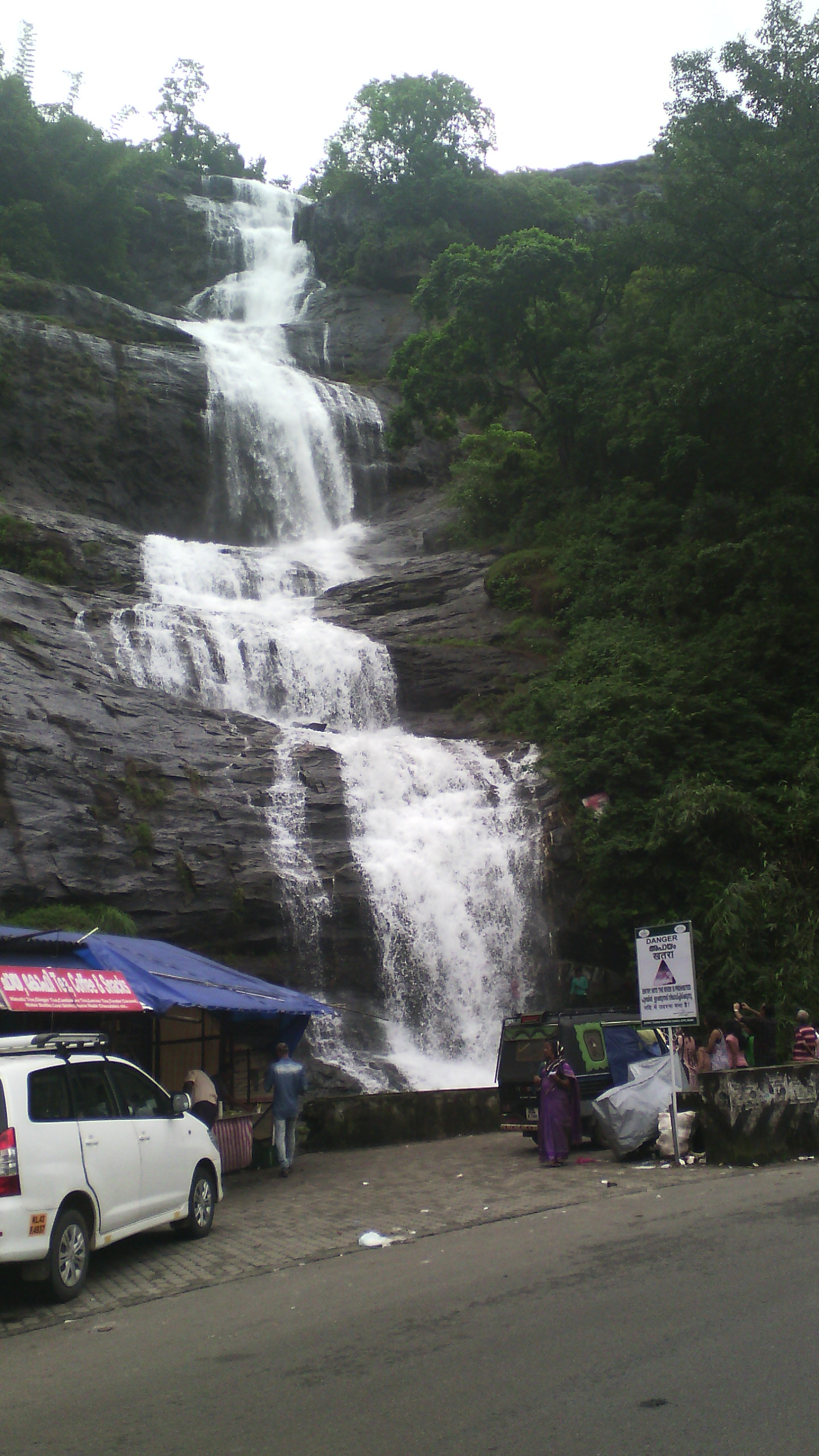
With visitors

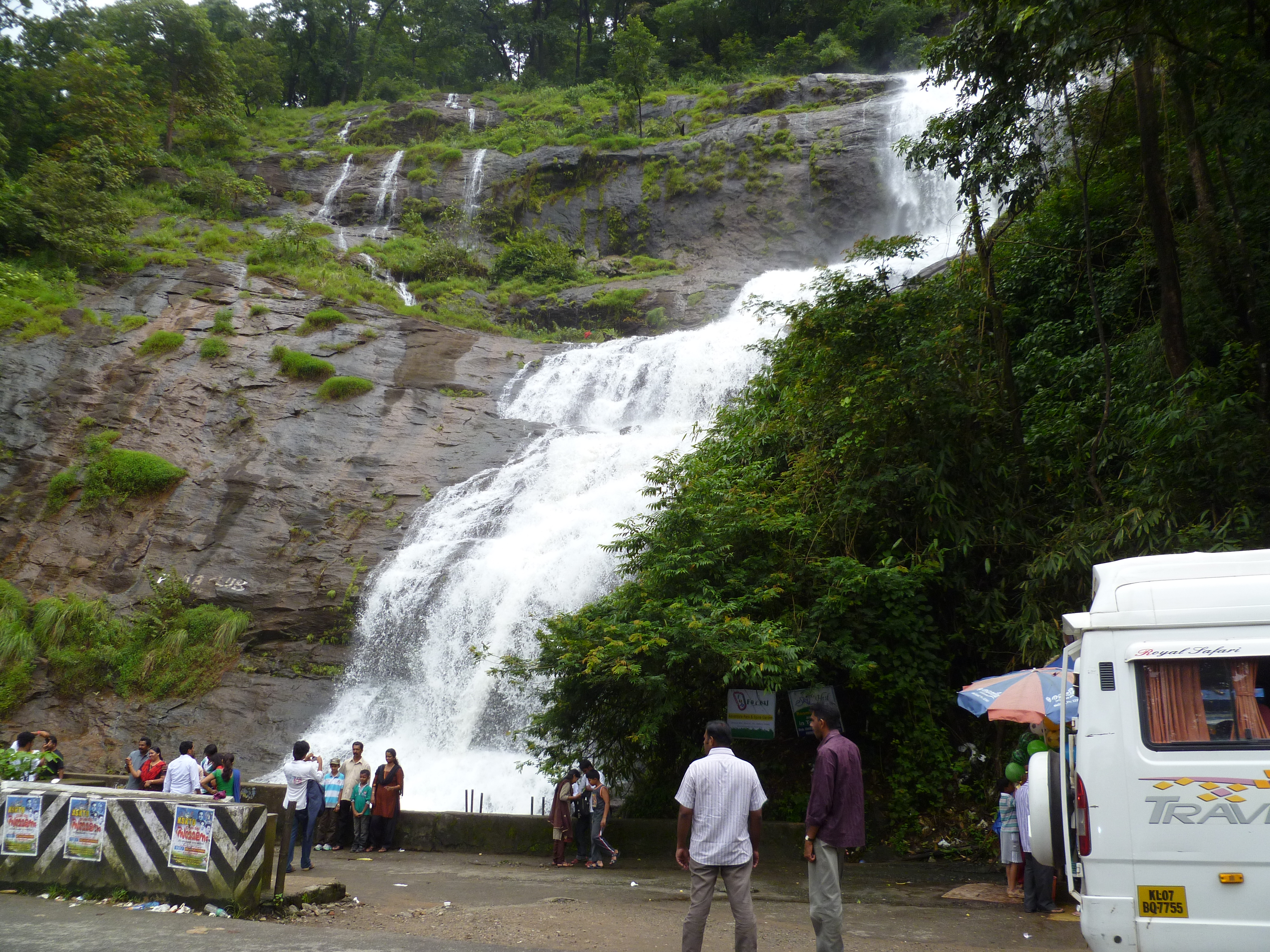
from right

video

== See also ==
- List of waterfalls
- List of waterfalls in India
- Munnar
- Valara Waterfall
- Ponmudi Dam
