= CSI Christ Church, Munnar =

Coordinates: 10°04′51″N 77°03′42″E

- CSI Church, Munnar
- CSI Christ Church, Munnar
- Location: Munnar, Idukki district, Kerala
- Country: India
- Denomination: Church of South India
- Previous denomination: Anglicanism

History
- Status: Active
- Founded: 1910

Architecture
- Architectural type: Church
- Style: Gothic Revival

CSI Christ Church is a historic church of Munnar in Idukki district in Indian state of Kerala. It is located in the Old Munnar area. The church is known for its stone construction, stained-glass windows and memorial plaques associated with British planters.

== History ==
The church was established during the period of British tea plantations in the region and was built in 1910. It is closely associated with the development of the town as a centre of tea plantations. There is a churchyard in the adjacent hill under the maintenance of the church authority.

== Gallery ==
Entrance of C.S.I.Christ Church

Board of C.S.I.Christ Church

Church campus

CSI graveyard

CSI Graveyard
