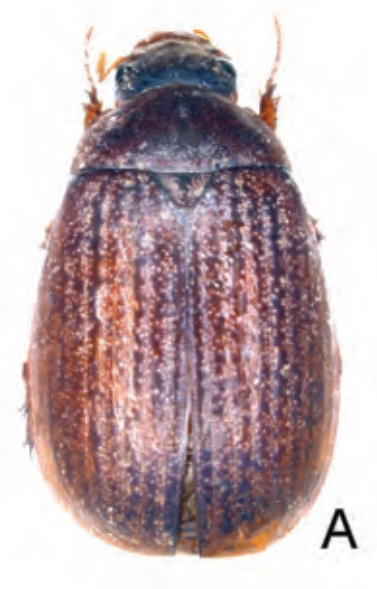

Scientific classification
- Kingdom: Animalia
- Phylum: Arthropoda
- Class: Insecta
- Order: Coleoptera
- Suborder: Polyphaga
- Infraorder: Scarabaeiformia
- Family: Scarabaeidae
- Genus: Neoserica
- Species: N. munnarensis

Binomial name
- Neoserica munnarensis Ahrens & Fabrizi, 2016

= Neoserica munnarensis =

Species of beetle

Neoserica munnarensis is a species of beetle of the family Scarabaeidae. It is found in India (Kerala).

== Description ==
Adults reach a length of about 12–14.6 mm. They have a dark brown, oblong-oval body. The antennal club and abdomen are yellowish brown. The dorsal surface is dull and sparsely setose.

== Etymology ==
The species name refers to its occurrence close to Munnar.
