= Cochin State Forest Tramway =

Indian cable railway (1907–1963)

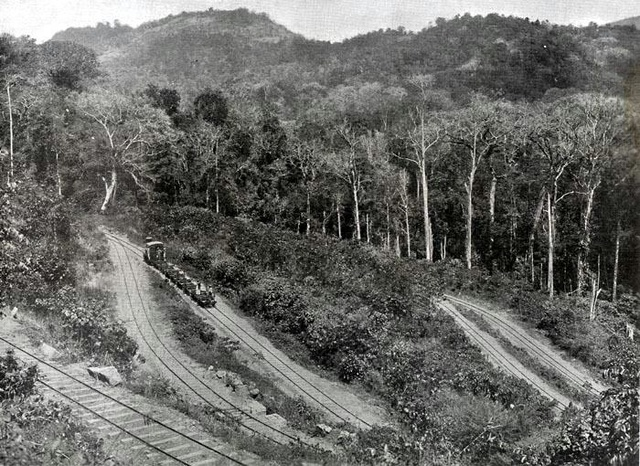
- Switchback on the main line

Overview
- Status: closed
- Locale: Palakkad and Thrissur Districts, State of Cochin
- Termini: Parambikulam Wildlife Sanctuary; Chalakudy
- Stations: 16

Service
- Type: Tramway

History
- Work began: 3 October 1905
- Opened: 1907
- Closed: 1963

Technical
- Line length: 79.5 km (49.4 mi)
- Track gauge: 1,000 mm (3 ft 3 3/8 in) metre gauge
Route map
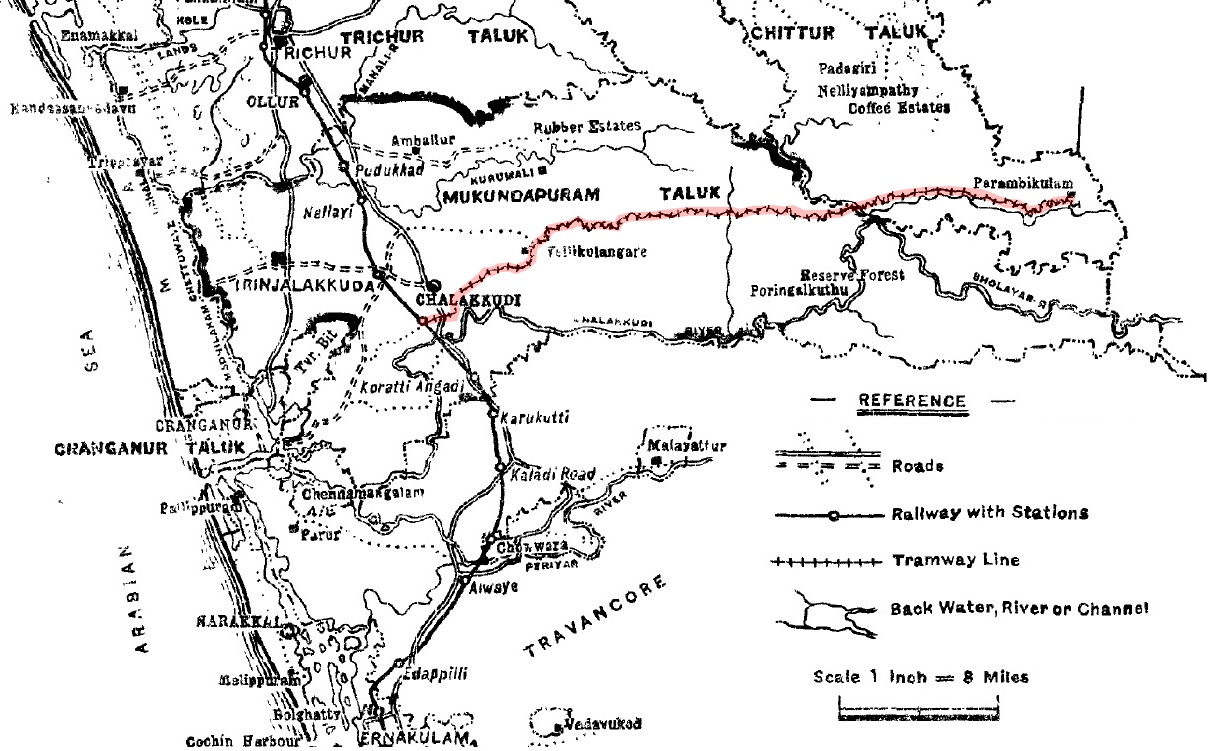
The line in 1944
Legend

- Headquarters: Chalakudy, India
- Key people: Rama Varma XV
- Products: Teak and Rosewood
- Revenue: Rs 17.5 lakhs
- Operating income: Rs 2 lakhs

The Cochin State Forest Tramway was a 1,000 mm (3 ft 3 3/8 in) metre gauge cable railway line that ran from the Parambikulam Wildlife Sanctuary in Palakkad District to the town of Chalakudy in Thrissur District in India. Operating from 1907 to 1963, it served the State of Cochin and brought prosperity by enabling the transport of teak and rosewood from the forest into town. These goods could then be exported abroad.

== History ==
=== Inception ===
The idea of a forest tramway was put forward by J.C. Kolhoff, first Conservator of Forests of the city of Cochin, and was implemented by V. Alwar Chetty, a forest officer on special duty. British officers Haldwell and Floukes performed the initial survey and route. R.E. Haffield was the first tramway engineer who cleared the forests and laid down the lines. The tramway was built during the rule of Rama Varma XV, Maharaja of Cochin (1895 to 1914). Sir Oliver Russell, 2nd Baron Ampthill, the Governor of Madras, inaugurated its construction on 3 October 1905. The tramway began operating in 1907. On 26 June 1907, the Maharaja of Cochin passed the Cochin Forest Tramway Act, which provided for the protection and management of the tramway.

=== Tram routes ===
The tramway was divided into three sections: the first started from Chalakudy and ended at Anapantham, covering a length of 21 miles; the second ran from Kavalai to Pothupara, covering six miles; and the third ran from Komalapara to Chinnar, covering 22.5 miles. The total length of tramway was 49.5 miles (79.5 km).

=== Machinery ===
Chalakudy used to house the tramway workshop and timber yard. The section had two locomotives to pull the trucks and saloons. The locomotives, rolling stock and machinery for the tramway were supplied by Orenstein and Koppel of Germany. P&W MacLennan of the U.K. supplied the bridges and culverts. K.R. Menon was the last tramway engineer. The tramway system had double lines and worked on rollers and cables. Empty wagons were rolled up while loaded wagons were pushed down along the other rails.

=== Demise ===
In 1926, the special finance committee recommended the abolition of the tramway, but was rejected by the Government in 1928. Another special committee was set up in 1950 under the chairmanship of the Chief Conservator of Forests, which recommended discontinuing of the tramway. In 1953, another commission was appointed but given the report that tramway should be revived at any cost. Finally in 1963, after serving 56 years and making modern Cochin Port a present-day commercial harbour and Cochin City, the economic hub, the Cochin State Forest Tramway was abolished on the basis of a special finance committee report. The staff was absorbed in various departments of Government.

== Legacy ==
The tramway was an engineering wonder in that period for South India. The money was used for building ports, bridges, roads, colleges, schools, etc. Cochin Port, a major port on the Arabian Sea – Indian Ocean sea-route, was constructed by the earnings from the tramway. Willingdon Island, which was created during construction of Cochin Port, was also bankrolled by tramway revenues.

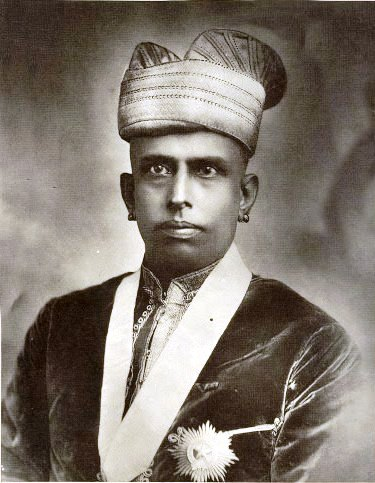
Rama Varma XV was the brain behind the idea of Cochin State Forest Tramway

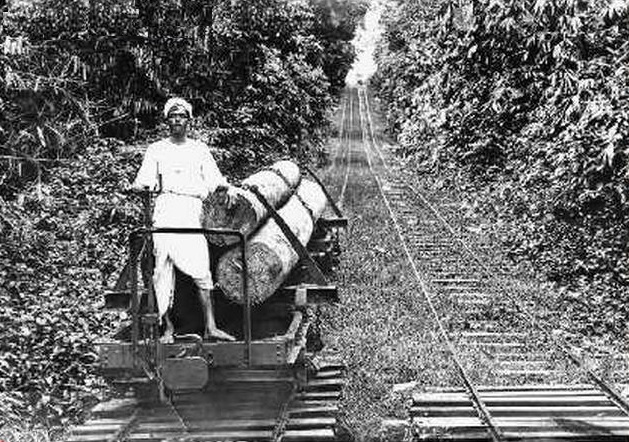
A section of the Tramway without locomotives

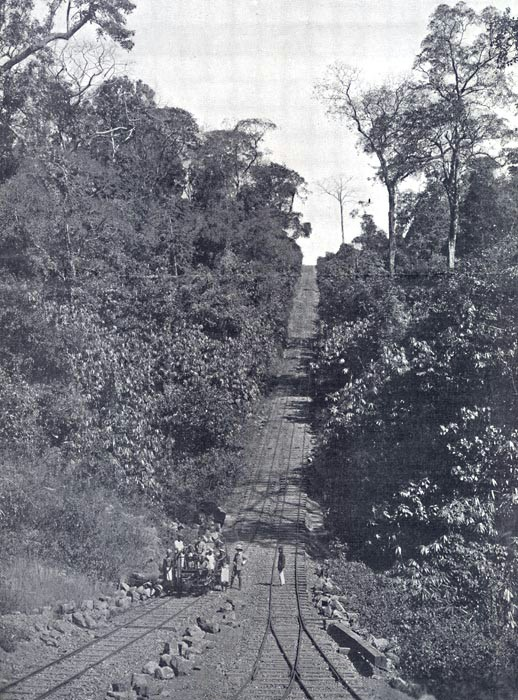
Steep incline section of the Tram

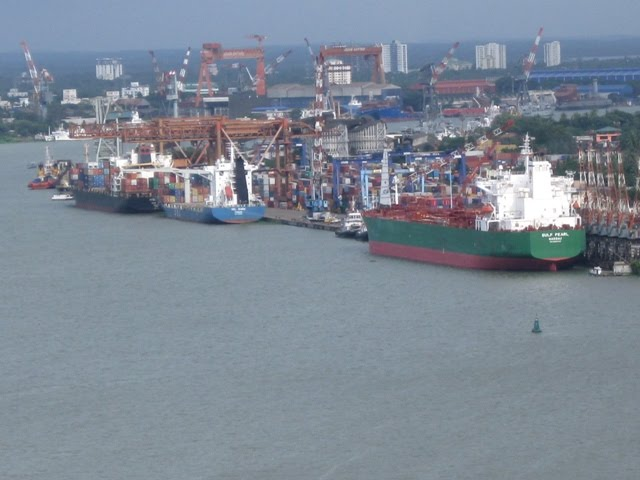
Cochin Port, the cherry in Kerala's growth, was constructed from the earnings of the tramway
