= Kambilikandam =

Village in Kerala, India

Kambilikandam is a village in Idukki district, Kerala state, India. Located 16 km from Adimaly, 30 km from Kattappana, 32 km from Munnar, 14 km from Thopramkudy and 27 km from Nedumkandam.

Most of the residents are farmers. There are so many attractive places nearby Kambilikandam. Also the place acts as the shortest connecting destination among various places of Idukki district for it is located almost at the center of the district. The place is situated in Konnathady Grama Panchayath of Idukki Thaluk.

There are two post offices in this area one is Mukkudam(685562) and the other one is Parathode-Idukki(685571). There is a post office in Manguva also.

Archaeological findings suggests of a clan based society in the Megalithic period in the High Ranges of Idukki district. Earthen burials were found at several places including Kambilikandam. Thellithodu is located near to it.
