= Adimali =

Adimali Adimali
- Town
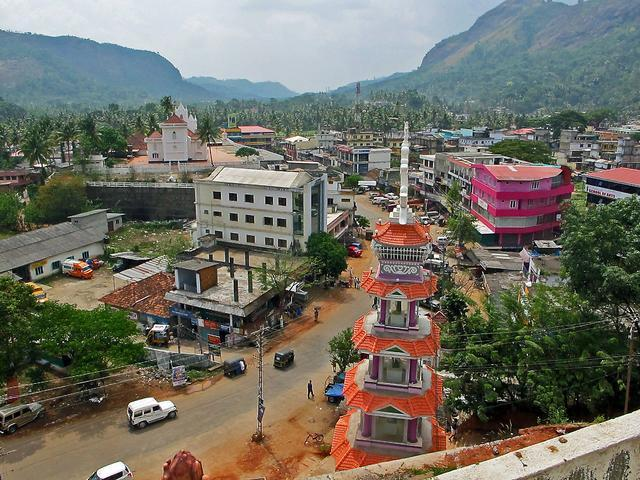
- Aerial view of Adimali town

- Location in Kerala, India Adimali (India)
- Coordinates: 10.0147600°N 76.956139°E
- Country: India
- State: Kerala
- District: Idukki
- Taluk: Devikulam

Government
  - Type: Grama Panchayat

Area
  - Total: 271.5 km^{2} (104.8 sq mi)
- Elevation: 650 m (2,130 ft)

Population (2011)
  - Total: 40,484
  - Density: 149.1/km^{2} (386.2/sq mi)

Languages
  - Official: Malayalam, English
- Time zone: UTC+5:30 (IST)
- PIN: 685561
- Telephone code: 04864
- Vehicle registration: KL-68
- Nearest towns: Kothamangalam, Kattappana, Nedumkandam
- Lok Sabha constituency: Idukki
- Vidhan Sabha constituency: Devikulam
- Sex ratio: 1005 ♂/♀

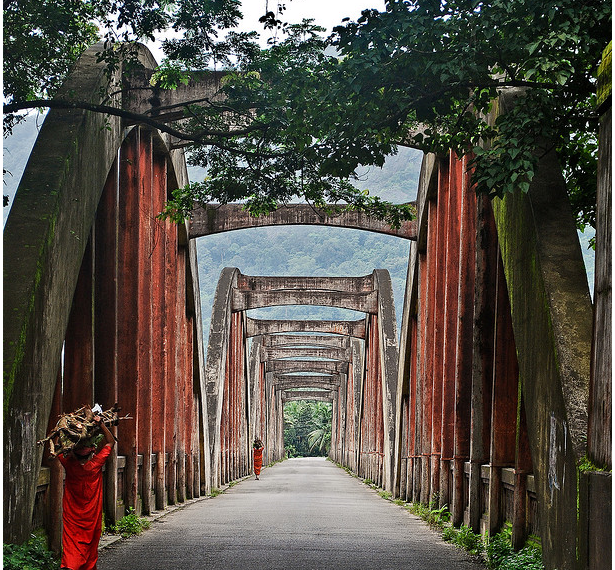
Neryamangalam bridge

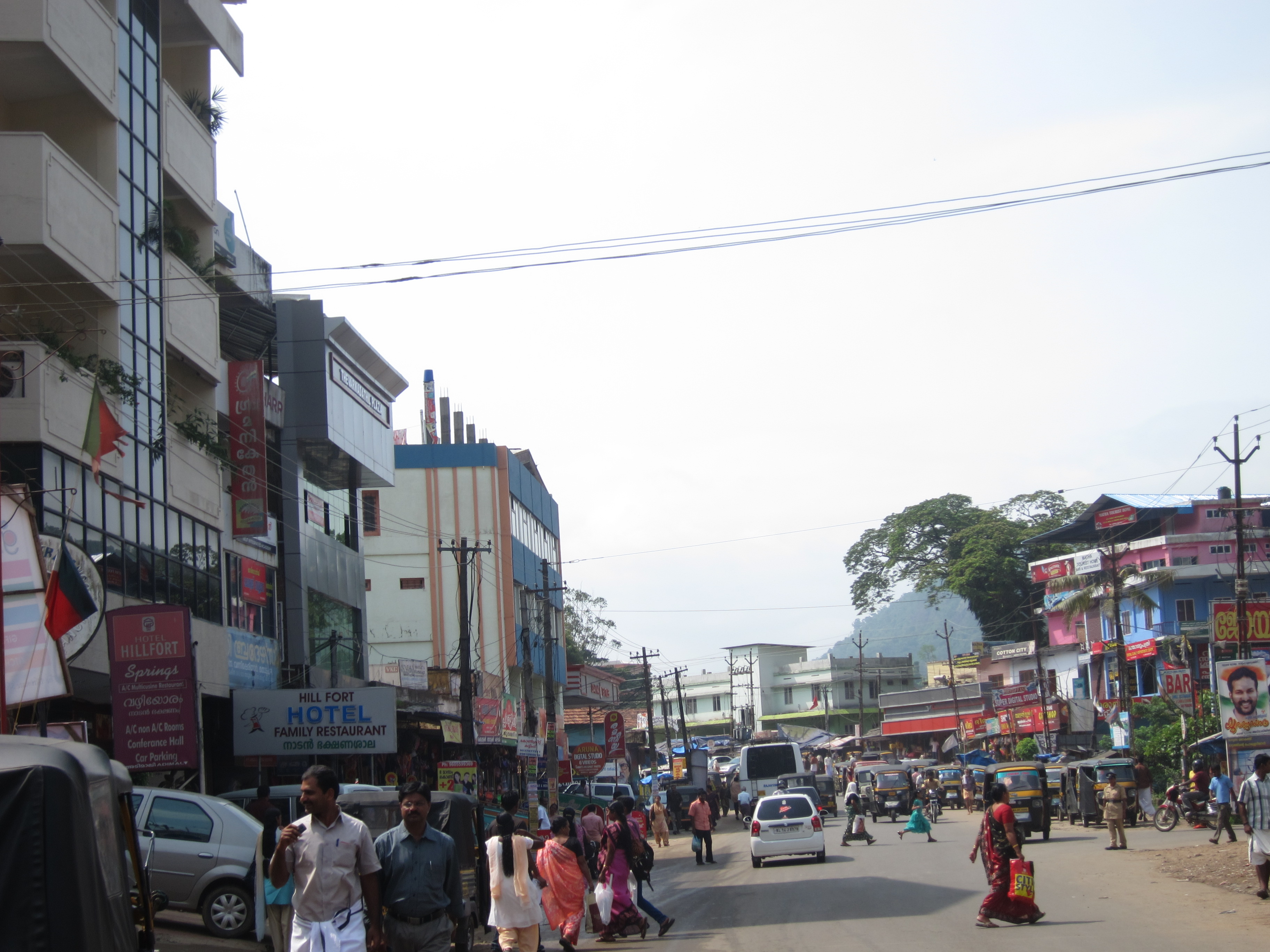
Adimali town

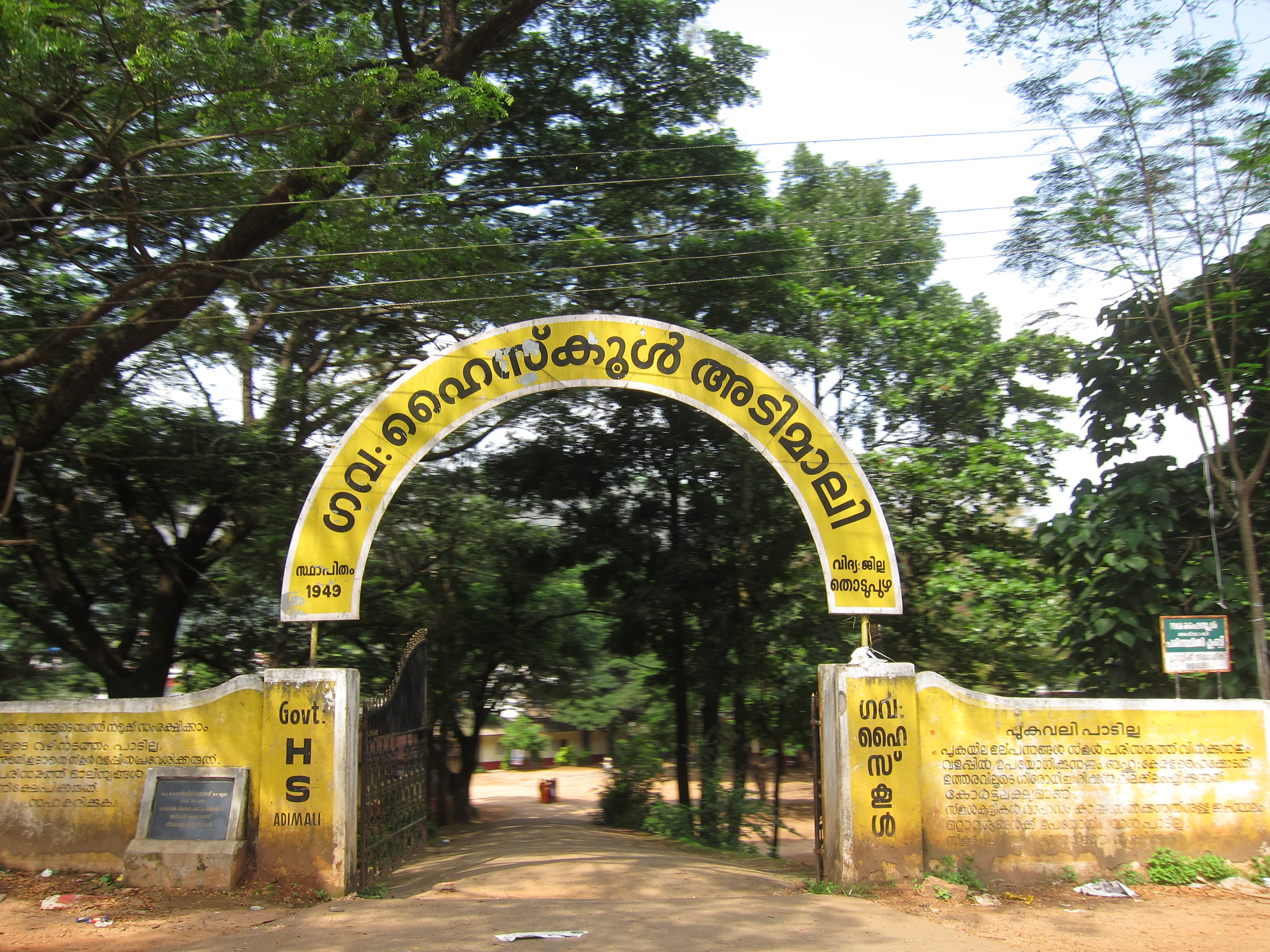
Government high school

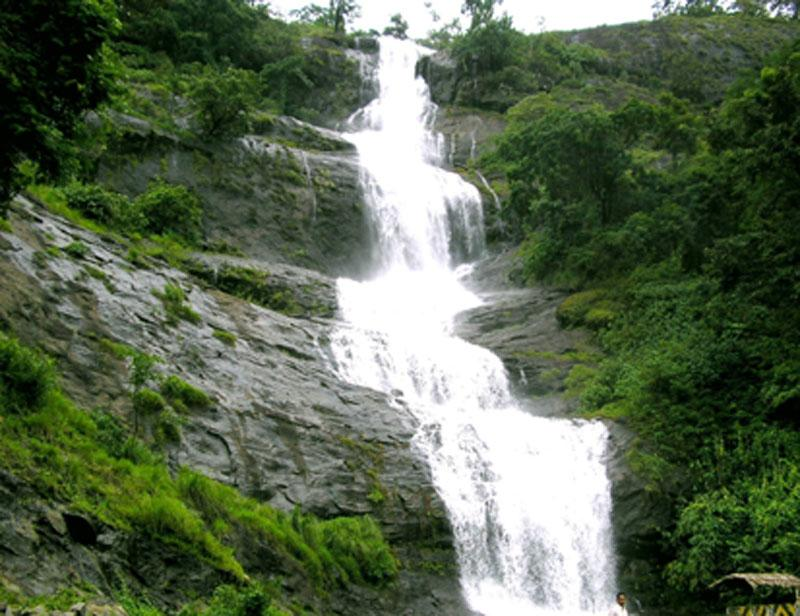
Cheeyappara

Adimali is a town in the Idukki district of Kerala, in southwestern India. Adimali is located on the National Highway 85, known as the Kochi-Thondi National Highway, earlier known as the Kochi Madhura Highway (or the old Alwaye Munnar road), which connects Kochi and Madurai. The highway NH 185 starts from Adimali junction with the new NH 85 connecting Cheruthoni, Painavu and terminates at its junction with the new NH 183 near Kumily in the State of Kerala. From Adimali, it is only 27 kilometers to Munnar, which is a famous hill station. The waterfalls Cheeyappara, Adimali and Valara are located nearby. Pepper and cocoa cultivation is the main agricultural activity of this area. The Ponmudi Dam (294 metres in length) was constructed in 1963 across the Panniar river, nearly 15 km southeast of Adimali, on the way to Rajakkad.Thopramkudy is the nearest town. Adimali is known for its proximity to Munnar and for its natural environment. Adimali has almost all basic facilities, including roads, supermarkets, markets, educational institutions and hospitals.

The former name of the Adimali area was Mannamkandam, as the name indicates the Mannan tribe once populated the area. Other tribal groups collectively called the Muthuvan were also living in Adimali. Before 1980, the main crops under cultivation were rice as well as pepper and cardamom. Now almost 90 percent of the paddy fields have been modified for other purposes such as residential land, rubber plantations or banana fields.

== History ==
Adimali is a relatively new town located between Kochi and Munnar. It gained its importance when the Government of Kerala allowed mass settlements of people from the neighboring districts in the Mid 20th Century. The majority of the people migrated from the Kottayam, Thodupuzha, Kothamangalam, and Muvattupuzha regions. Since it intersects two major roads and is a popular resting point on the way to Munnar, Adimali slowly grew in size. Adimali has emerged as a major population center in the district.

Adimali is located on the National Highway 49 connecting Kochi and Madurai. Munnar -a hill station- is about 30 km from Adimali. The Cheeyappara and Valara waterfalls are located en route to Adimali. Pepper is the major cultivation in this area. Kallarkutti dam, which is constructed across the Muthirappuzha River, is about 9.5 km from Adimali, on the way to panikkankudi. The dam was constructed in 1961 as the part of Neriamangalam hydro electric project. Ponmudi Dam, which is constructed across the Panniar river, is about 15 km from Adimali, on the way to Rajakkad. The dam which was built in 1963 has a length of 294 m. The places nearby to this area are Kuthirayalla, Pettimudi, and Mankulam. Pettimudi area is near to Tamil Nadu.

Adimali for decades served as a commercial hub for many smaller towns nearby such as Kunjithanny, Anachal, Rajakkad, Shanthanpara, Vellathooval, Murikkassery, Thopramkudi, Panikkankudi, Kallarkutti etc. However, the reliance on Adimali by these smaller towns faded during the years due to development of adequate roads and other infrastructure, few have emerged as self-reliant commercial townships.

== Geography ==
Adimali is located in an area with several waterfalls, valleys and hills. It is known for its pepper and cardamom plantations. The area also has a few dams and adjoining man-made reservoirs.

=== Cheeyappara Waterfall ===
The rapids of Cheeyappara descend from a height of about 1000 feet, churning with force onto 13 rock slabs in the vicinity of a bridge on National Highway 49. It is one of the few waterfalls one can view from the bottom, standing so close to the water. Next to the falls, there is a designated bathing area.

=== Valara Waterfall ===
Valara Waterfall is another 1 kilometer from Cheeyapara waterfall en route to Adimali. One of the tributaries of The Periyar River cascades steeply from the top of a hill to a depth of about 200 feet, into a gorge.

=== Adimali Waterfall ===
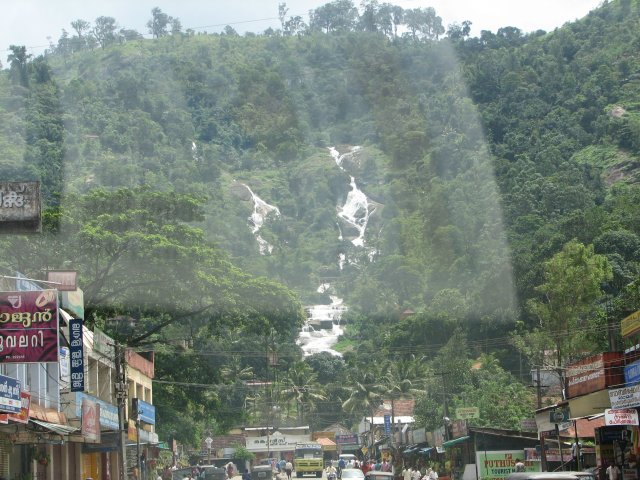
Adimali waterfall

Near the centre of Adimali township, an eponymous waterfall has become an attraction and landmark, accessible from the town.

== Healthcare ==
Adimali is served by both public and private hospitals. The Taluk Head Quarters Hospital, Adimali is the major government facility and became the first taluk hospital in Kerala to have a functional Cardiac ICU and catheterisation laboratory (cath lab) in November 2026.

Morning Star Medical Centre, located on Nazareth Hill, is a major private hospital established in 1985 and run by the Nazareth Medical Society.

== Climate ==
Adimali generally has a cool climate throughout the year, typical of the higher altitudes, though not as cold as Munnar. Temperatures rarely exceed 26 degrees and never drop below 10 degrees as it usually stays around 17-24 degrees. December and January are cooler than other months. Adimali is a place with heavy rainfall mostly throughout the year and it is heaviest during the June–September season of southwest monsoon. Rains in Adimali sometimes continue for hours or even days without any dry spell, which may bring the town to a standstill.

New residents frequently relocate to Adimali, owing to its atmosphere and surroundings.

== Notable people ==
- Maina Umaiban, Malayalam language writer and academic
- Binu Adimali, an Indian comedian and actor who primarily works in Malayalam Film Industry
- Sachin Baby, an Indian cricketer who plays for Kerala

== Nearby places ==
- Munnar
- Kallarkutty
- 200 Acre
- 1000 Acre
- Kambilikandam
- Pullukandam
- Parathode
- Panickankudi
- Pallivasal
- Vellathooval
- Konnathady
- Murickassery
- Koompanpara
- Muniyara
- Rajakkad
- Rajakumari
