= Myna Umaiban =

Indian Malayalam language writer

- Born: 22 February 1978 (age 48); Adimali, Idukki district, Kerala
- Occupations: Short story writer, novelist, academic
- Spouse: Sunil K. Faisal
- Children: 2
- Writing career
- Notable awards: Kerala State Institute of Children's Literature Award

Myna Umaiban is a toxicology book researcher and author from Kerala, India. She holds a Doctorate in Scientific and Cultural Analysis of Traditional Toxicology Books in Kerala. She has authored numerous books including novels, short stories and books on toxicology.

== Biography ==
Myna Umaiban was born on 22 February 1978 in Adimali Deviar Colony in Idukki district of Kerala. She done her primary education from Government Lower Primary School, Marayoor, St. Mary's Upper Primary School, Marayoor and Deviar Colony Vocational Higher Secondary School, Idukki. She then completed a degree in commerce and post graduate degree in Malayalam and Sociology and post graduate diploma in Mass Communication & Journalism.

Myna was born in a family that traditionally treats poisoning. Her grand father was also a traditional medical practitioner. That's how Maina's interest in books about Traditional Toxicology came about.

Myna Umaiban has worked as a clerk in Calicut Co-operative Urban Bank for some time. She got the job in the bank while studying journalism. After completing her studies on leave, she returned to work in the Co-operative Urban Bank.

Myna later done her Doctorate in Scientific and Cultural Analysis of Toxicology Books in Kerala. After that she joined MES Mampad College as a teacher. While working as the Head of the Malayalam Section at MES College, she represented Kerala at the United Nations World Reconstruction Conference held in Geneva, Switzerland from 13 to 17 May 2019. In Geneva, she presented a paper on the subject 'Floods and Gender Justice'. She is also a member of the Executive Committee of the Malabar Natural History Society, a member of the Editorial Board of the Eureka Biweekly and a member of the Executive Committee of the MES College Biodiversity Club.

=== Personal life ===
Her husband Sunil K Faisal is a senior manager in Kozhikode District Co-operative Bank. They have two children.

== Literary career ==
Myna started writing when she was eight or nine years old. After seeing a play in school, she wrote a play first. Later, the plays were performed with the help of friends and relatives. Maina, who started writing poetry while studying in the eighth grade, started writing short stories during her degree studies. Attending the Basheer Memorial Short Story Workshop at Nehru College, Kanhangad inspired her to focus more on writing. Her first novel Chandanagramam has been shortlisted in the Mathrubhumi Novel Competition.

Myna writes articles and stories on environmental, women and social issues in many periodicals.

== Selected works ==
=== Novels ===
- Chandanagramam (in Malayalam). Mathrubhumi Books. 2007. ISBN 978-8182643727.
- Athmadamshanam (in Malayalam). Logos Books. 2012. ISBN 9789388364195.
- Highrange theevandi (in Malayalam). Poorna Publications. 2018. ISBN 9788130021225. Children's literature.
- Mavu Valarthiya kutti (in Malayalam). Poorna Publications. 2017. ISBN 9788130019581. Children's literature.

=== Short story collection ===
- Oruthi (in Malayalam). Logos Books. 2016. ISBN 9789385064746.

=== Article collections ===
- Pen Nottangal (in Malayalam). National Book Stall. 2012. ISBN 9780000106216.
- Athmadamshanam (in Malayalam). Logos Books. 2012. ISBN 9789388364195.

=== Studies ===
- kadhayamama. Sikha Grandhavedi. 2017. ISBN 9788192796574. Studies of Contemporary Malayalam Short stories wrote with Rajesh monji.

=== Travelogue ===
- Chuvappu pattayam thedi (in Malayalam). Kerala Shasthra Sahithya Parishath. 2014. ISBN 9789383330416.

=== Toxicology ===
- Keraleeya Vishachikitsa Paramparyam (in Malayalam). Kerala Bhasha Institute. 2013. ISBN 9788176385367.
- Visha Chikilsa (in Malayalam). Olive Publications. ISBN 9789381788363.

== Awards and honors ==
- Anganam Award 2013 (for a collection of environmental articles named athmadamsanam)
- New Age Icon 2011
- Singapore World Malayalee Council Travelogue Award
- Kerala State Institute of Children's Literature Award 2020 (for the novel High Range Theevandi)
