= Valara =

- village
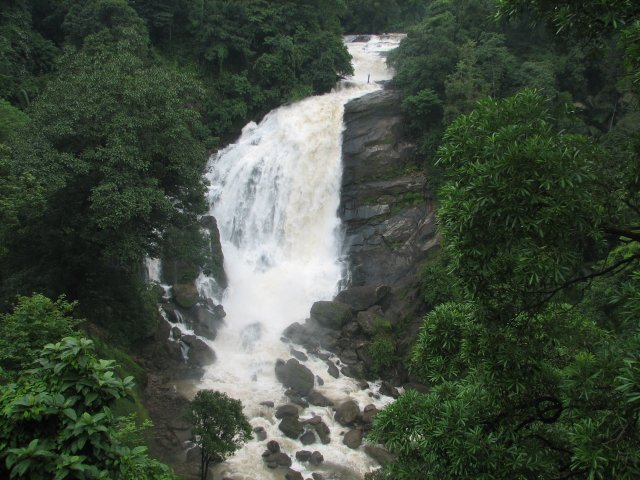
- Valara Waterfalls from National Highway 49

- Location in Kerala, India
- Coordinates: 10°18′36″N 76°29′45″E
- Country: India
- State: Kerala
- District: Idukki
- Talukas: Devikulam

Languages
  - Official: Malayalam, English
- Time zone: UTC+5:30 (IST)
- PIN: 685561
- Telephone code: 914864
- Vehicle registration: KL-68
- Nearest city: Kochi
- Lok Sabha constituency: Idukki
- Vidhan Sabha constituency: Devikulam

Valara (Malayalam: വാളറ) is located in between Neriamangalam on the eastern border of the Ernakulam District and Adimali of Kochi - Madurai National Highway (NH-49). It is in Idukki district, Kerala, at a distance of 14 km from Adimali.

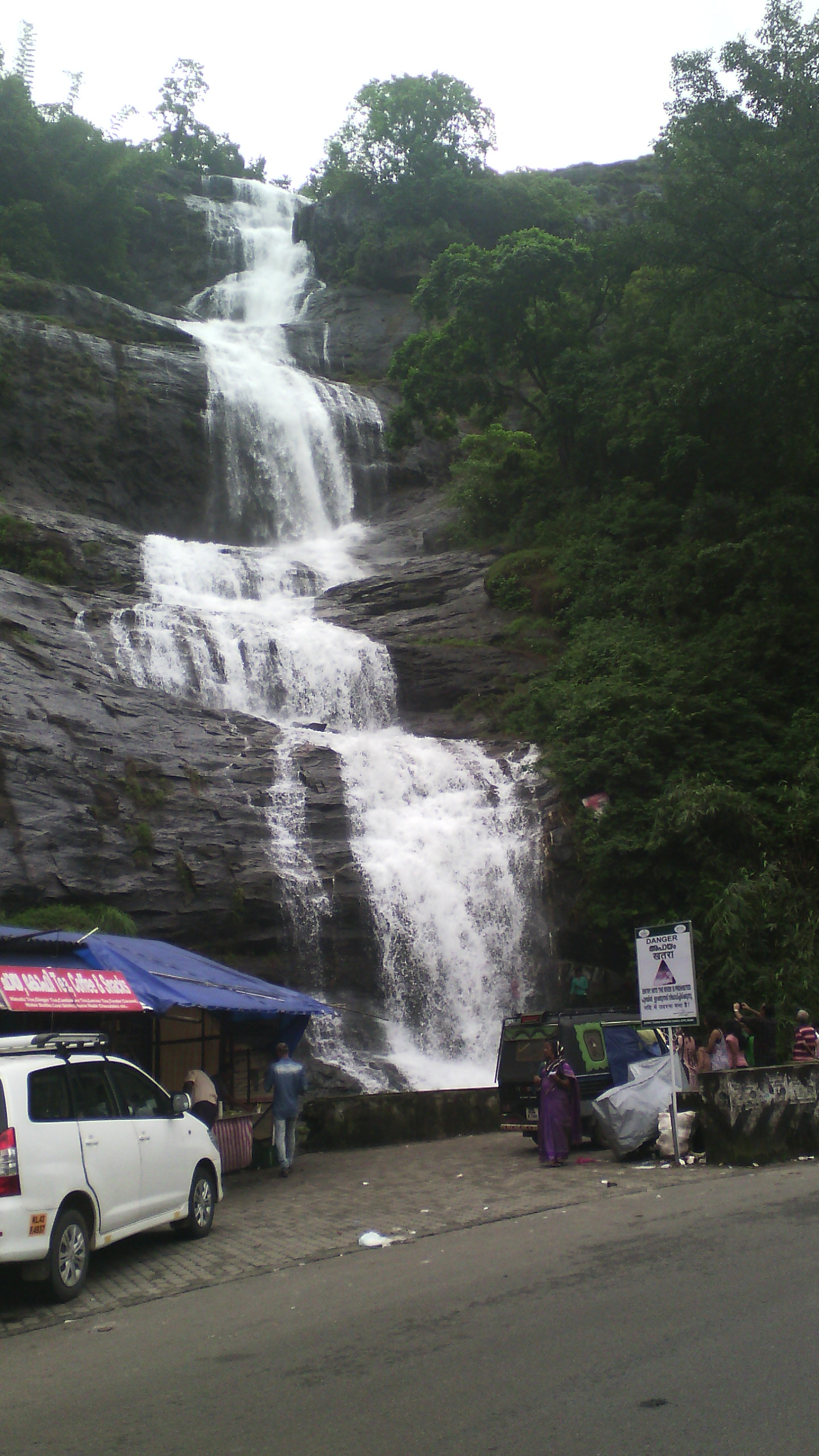
Cheeyappara Waterfalls from National Highway 49

The main attraction of this place is Valara waterfalls. Which is in the Deviyar river, a small river originating from western ghats, passing through Adimali Grama Panchayath. The Thottiyar Hydro Electric project is the New project of KSEB. The Project proposed in the river Thottiyar (Deviyar), a tributary of river Periyar in Idukki District of Kerala State. The scheme envisages utilization of the water from a catchment area of 59 km^{2}, and by diverting the water by constructing a weir across the river Thottiyar through an open cut channel, conveyance tunnel, penstock to generate electricity in a surface power house. The tail race water will be led to the same river through a tail race channel. Valara has chain of waterfalls surrounded by thick green forests. Cheeyappara Waterfall is nearby.

== See also ==
- List of waterfalls
- List of waterfalls in India
