= Konnathady =

- village
- Location in Kerala, India Konnathady (India)
- Coordinates: 9°58′0″N 77°1′0″E
- Country: India
- State: Kerala
- District: Idukki
- Taluk: Idukki

Population (2011)
  - Total: 29,092

Languages
  - Official: Malayalam, English
- Time zone: UTC+5:30 (IST)

Konnathady is a gram panchayat village in Idukki district in the Indian state of Kerala. It is situated 14 km south of National Highway 49, just south of the Mullayar River.

== Demographics ==
As of 2011 India census, Konnathady had a population of 29,092 with 14,637 males and 14455 females.
