= Kunchithanny =

- village
- Location in Kerala, India Kunchithanny (India)
- Coordinates: 10°0′48″N 77°3′48″E
- Country: India
- State: Kerala
- District: Idukki district

Government
  - Body: Vellathooval Grama Panchayat

Area
  - Total: 25.77 km^{2} (9.95 sq mi)

Population (2011)
  - Total: 12,202
  - Density: 473.5/km^{2} (1,226/sq mi)

Languages
  - Official: Malayalam
  - Regional: Malayalam, Tamil
- Time zone: UTC+5:30 (IST)
- Vehicle registration: KL-06, KL-68, KL-69

Kunchithanny is a village in the Idukki district in the Indian state of Kerala. The village is on the banks of the river Muthirappuzha.

== Demographics ==
As of 2011 Census, Kunchithanny had a population of 12,202 with 6,193 males and 6,009 females. Kunchithanny village has an area of 25.77 km^{2} (9.95 sq mi) with 3,069 families residing in it. The average male female sex ratio was 970 lower than the state average of 1084. In Kunchithanny, 9.56% of the population was under 6 years of age. Kunchithanny had an average literacy of 93.5% higher than the national average of 74% and lower than state average of 94%.

== See also ==
- Ellakkal
