= Devikulam =

- Village
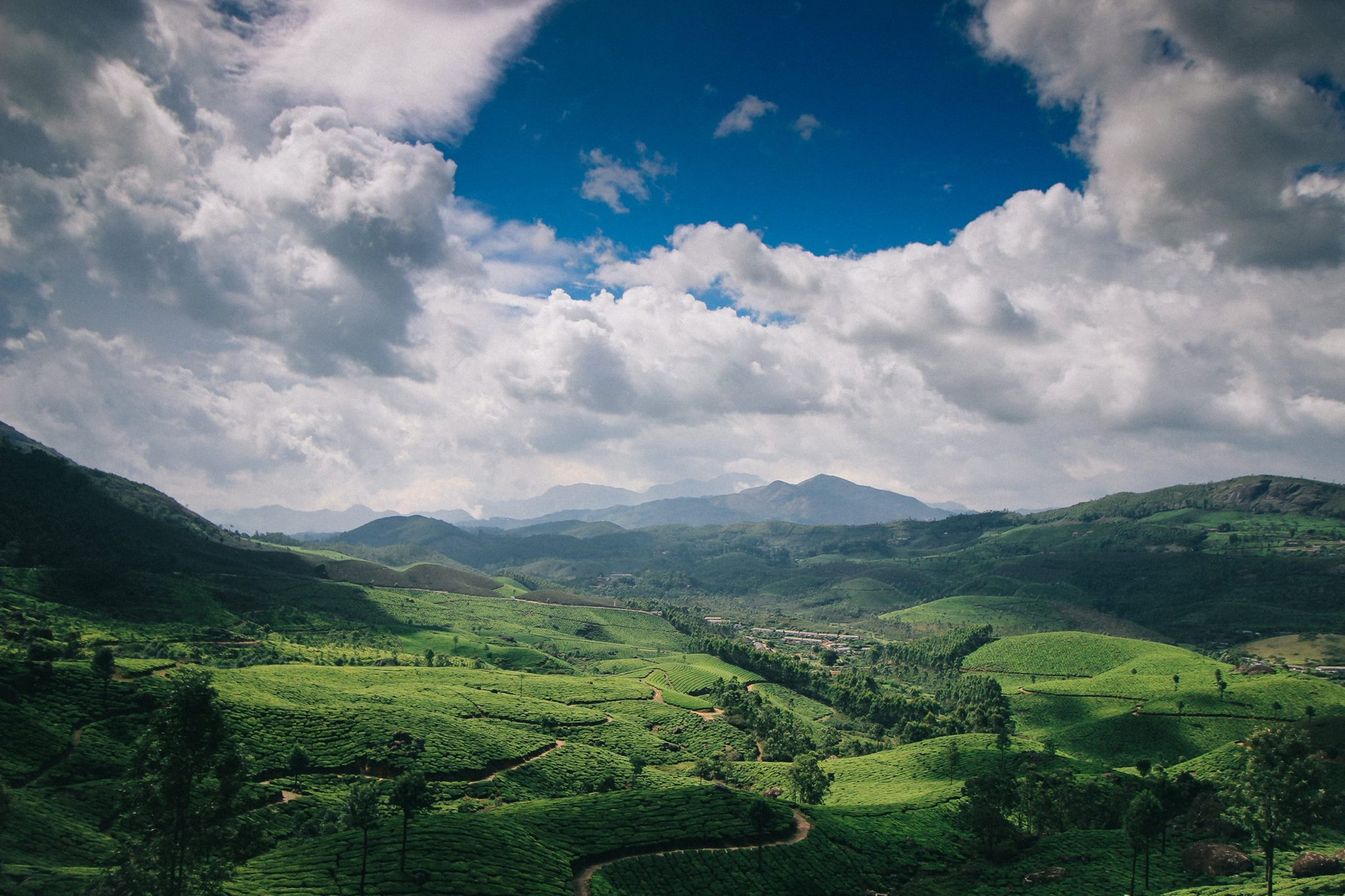
- Tea plantations of Devikulam. Taken from National Highway 85

- Location in Kerala, India Devikulam (India)
- Coordinates: 10.062640°N 77.103990°E
- Country: India
- State: Kerala
- District: Idukki

Government
  - Type: Panchayati raj (India)
  - Body: Devikulam Grama Panchayat

Area
  - Total: 215 km^{2} (83 sq mi)

Population
  - Total: 23,709
  - Density: 110/km^{2} (286/sq mi)

Languages
  - Official: Malayalam, English
  - Regional: Malayalam, Tamil
- Time zone: UTC+5:30 (IST)
- PIN: 685613
- Area code: 04865
- Vehicle registration: KL-68

Devikulam is a Grama Panchayat and small hill station about 8 kilometres (5.0 mi) away from Munnar in the Idukki District of Kerala, India. It lies about 1,800 metres (5,900 ft) above sea level.

== Etymology ==
The name Devikulam is a conjunction of the words Devi, from the goddess Devi and kulam, meaning pond.

== Demographics ==
As of 2011 Census, Devikulam Grama Panchayat had a population of 23,709 among which 11,912 are males and 11,797 are females. The total number of families in the Panchayat limits were 6,166. The average sex ratio was 990, lower than the state average of 1084. In Devikulam, 8% of the population was under 6 years of age. Devikulam had an average literacy of 86.3%, lower than the state average of 94%.

== History ==
According to legend, the goddess Sita Devi of the Ramayana epic bathed in the Devikulam lake which is now called Sita Devi Lake.

=== Gallery ===
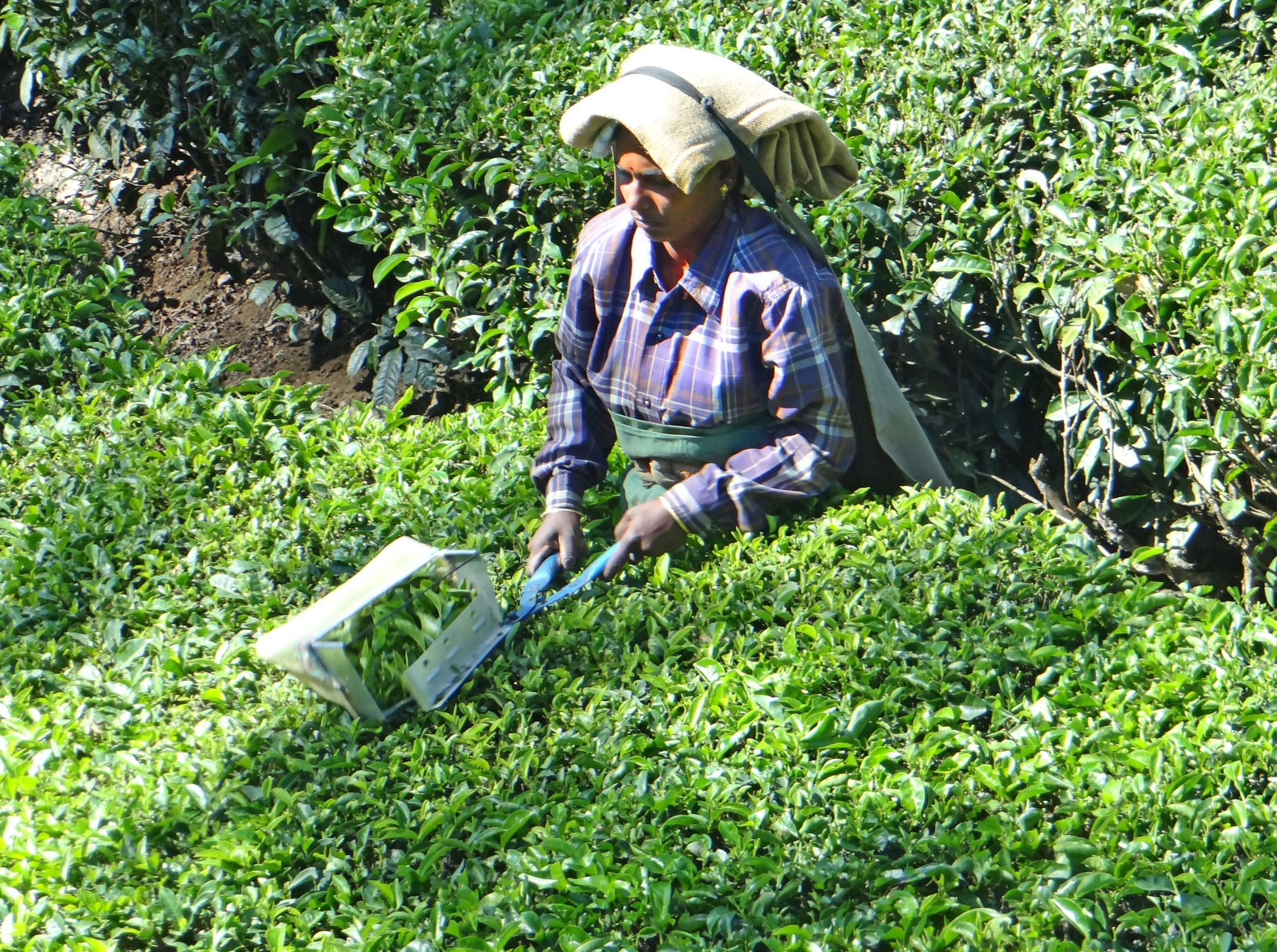
Devikulam estate

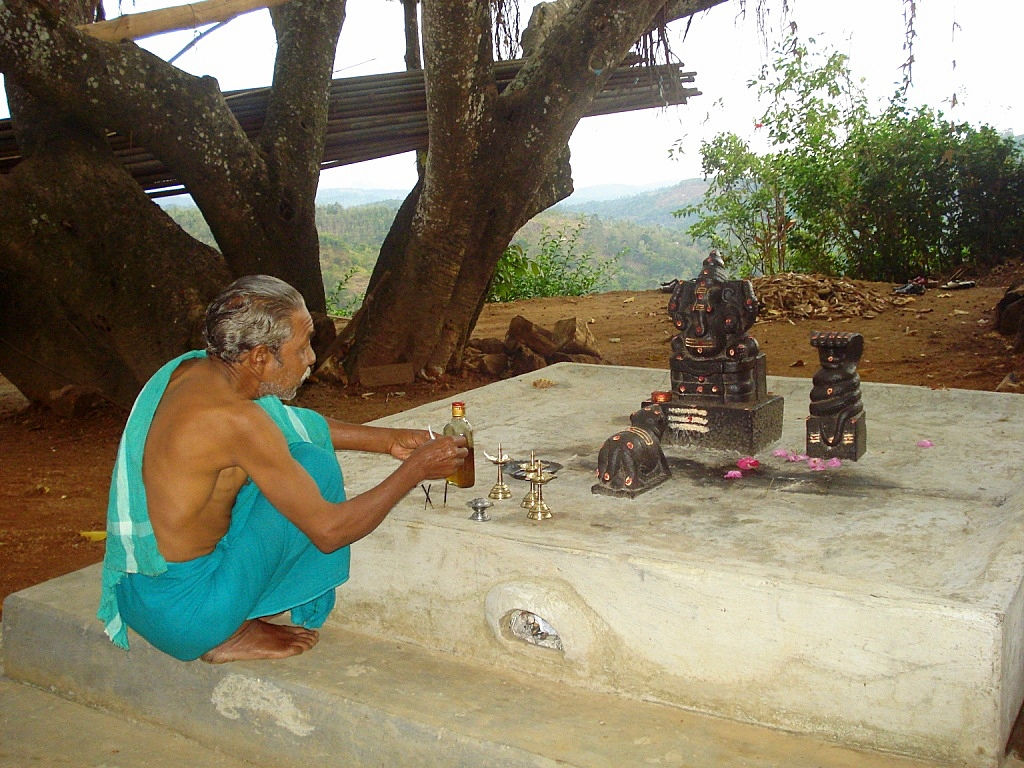
Tribal Temple at Rajakumari
