= Rajakkad =

- Town
- Location in Kerala, India Rajakkad (India)
- Coordinates: 9°57′50″N 77°6′0″E
- Country: India
- State: Kerala
- District: Idukki

Area
  - Total: 32.66 km^{2} (12.61 sq mi)

Population (2011)
  - Total: 16,486

Languages
  - Official: Malayalam, English
- Time zone: UTC+5:30 (IST)
- PIN: 685566
- Telephone code: 04868
- Vehicle registration: KL-69, KL-06, KL-37
- Nearest towns: Kothamangalam, Thodupuzha, Munnar, Kattappana, Cheruthoni, Nedumkandam, Adimali, Rajakumari
- Lok Sabha constituency: Idukki
- Vidhan Sabha constituency: Udumbanchola

Rajakkad is a town in the Idukki district of the Indian state of Kerala. Situated in the Western Ghats, it is an important commercial and agricultural centre in the high ranges of Idukki district.

== History ==
Until the early twentieth century, much of the area surrounding present-day Rajakkad consisted of dense forests within the high ranges of Travancore. The region remained sparsely populated due to its rugged terrain and limited transportation facilities.

Large-scale settlement began during the first half of the twentieth century when migrants from Central Travancore, particularly from present-day Kottayam, Pathanamthitta and Ernakulam districts, moved into the high ranges in search of agricultural land. Forest areas were gradually cleared and converted into plantations and farmlands, leading to the establishment of several settlements in the region.

The development of roads connecting Adimali, Munnar, Kattappana and neighbouring high-range settlements contributed significantly to the growth of Rajakkad. Owing to its strategic location, the town emerged as a commercial centre serving nearby agricultural communities and plantation estates.

During the post-independence period, the expansion of cardamom, pepper, coffee and tea cultivation accelerated economic growth in the region. Rajakkad developed into an important market town for the surrounding plantation belt and became a centre for education, trade and public services in eastern Idukki district.

The town's demographic and cultural character continues to reflect the migration history of the high ranges, with many families tracing their origins to the Central Travancore region.

== Geography ==
Rajakkad is in the eastern part of Idukki district in the high-range region of Kerala in the Cardamom Hills of the Western Ghats. It forms part of the elevated Periyar river basin plateau of Idukki district.

== Economy ==
Agriculture is the primary economic activity in Rajakkad and surrounding areas. The town lies within the Cardamom Hills region of Idukki district, one of India's most important centres of small cardamom cultivation.

Cardamom, black pepper, ginger, coffee, tea, nutmeg and cloves are among the major crops cultivated in the region.

Rajakkad is a commercial centre for nearby plantation settlements and agricultural communities.

== Demographics ==
As of 2011 Census, Rajakkad had a population of 16,486 with 8,229 males and 8,257 females. Rajakkad village has an area of 32.66 km^{2} (12.61 sq mi) with 4,094 families residing in it. In Rajakkad, 9.2% of the population was under 6 years of age. Rajakkad had an average literacy of 96.7% higher than the state average of 94%: male literacy was 97.9% and female literacy was 95.5%.

== Education ==
Rajakkad serves as an educational centre for nearby villages and plantation settlements. The town has a number of government and private educational institutions offering primary, secondary and higher secondary education.

Government Higher Secondary School, Rajakkad, established in 1955, is among the prominent educational institutions in the region.

== Transportation ==
Rajakkad is connected by road to Munnar, Adimali, Kattappana, Thodupuzha, Kochi and other towns in Kerala. Both Kerala State Road Transport Corporation (KSRTC) and private bus services operate through the town.

The nearest major railway station is Aluva railway station, while the nearest airport is Cochin International Airport.

== Tourism ==
Rajakkad is surrounded by scenic landscapes, spice plantations and viewpoints. Tourist attractions in and around the region include Kallimali View Point, Ponmudi Dam, Kanakakunnu View Point and Kuthumkal Waterfalls.

The town serves as a gateway to several destinations in the high ranges of Idukki district, including Munnar and surrounding hill regions.

== See also ==
- Idukki district
- Munnar
- Western Ghats
- Udumbanchola
