= Munnar =

Town in Kerala, India

- Town
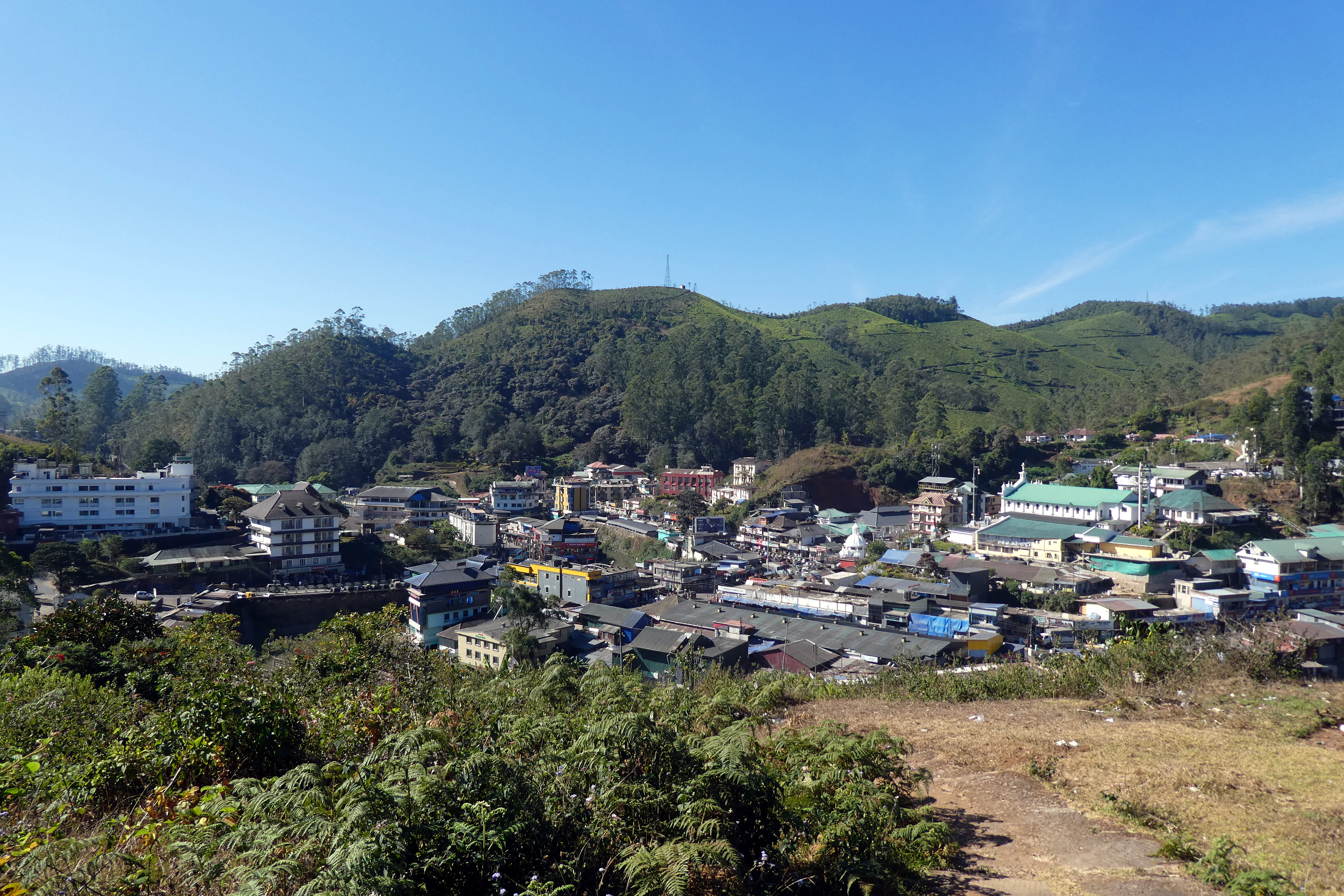
- A view of Munnar downtown.

- Location within Kerala Location within India
- Coordinates: 10°05′21″N 77°03′35″E
- Country: India
- State: Kerala
- District: Idukki
- Taluk: Devikulam
- Named for: Three rivers confluence

Government
  - Type: Grama Panchayat
  - Body: Munnar Grama Panchayat

Area
  - Total: 187 km^{2} (72 sq mi)
- Elevation: 1,532 m (5,026 ft)

Population (2011)
  - Total: 32,029
  - Density: 171/km^{2} (444/sq mi)

Languages
  - Official: Malayalam
  - Regional: Tamil, Malayalam
- Time zone: UTC+5:30 (IST)
- PIN: 685612
- Telephone code: 04865
- Vehicle registration: KL-68, KL-06
- Literacy: 84.9%
- Website: keralatourism.org/destination

Munnar (Malayalam pronunciation: [muːn̪ːɐːr]) is a town located in the Idukki district of the southwestern Indian state of Kerala. Munnar is situated at around 1,600 metres (5,200 ft) above mean sea level, in the Western Ghats mountain range. This ancient plantation settlement, dominated by its tea industry, is also a growing modern hill station.

== Etymology ==
The name Munnar is a combination of the words "Munnu" and "Aaru" in the local languages of Malayalam/Tamil meaning "three rivers", referring to its location at the confluence of the Muthirapuzha, Nallathanni and Kundali River rivers.

== History ==
The region has been inhabited by hunter-gatherer tribals like the Malayarayan and Muthuvan for thousands of years. In the early days, only Tamils and few Malayalis lived there. They were brought as workers in the tea plantations. Tradition states that Colonel Arthur Wellesley, later the Duke of Wellington, was the first British person to pass through Munnar during Tipu Sultan's campaign in Travancore, but this is unsubstantiated. The first survey of the terrain was undertaken by Benjamin Swayne Ward in 1816–1817, who followed Periyar into the Western Ghats and established a camp at the confluence of three rivers, from which the name of Munnar is derived.

50 years later Sir Charles Trevelyan who was the Governor of Madras, instructed Col. Douglas Hamilton to explore the hill country in the western part of the Madras Presidency, requesting special advice on the feasibility of establishing sanatoria for the British in the South and of developing revenue- earning projects without endangering the environment, as had happened in Ceylon where coffee had destroyed not only the rain forest but also paddy cultivation in the north-central rice bowl of ancient Ceylon. Hamilton climbed throughout the Ghats in Munnar region. 15 years later, John Daniel Munro noted that much of Munnar's land was suitable for coffee plantations. Munro, Henry Turn, and his half-brother AW Turner obtained ownership of the Cardamom Hills from the Raja of Travancore and began clearing forest around Devikulam in 1879. Soon many other Europeans began establishing tea plantations in the area throughout the 1880s. Early plantations had few facilities and were mainly huts of straw.

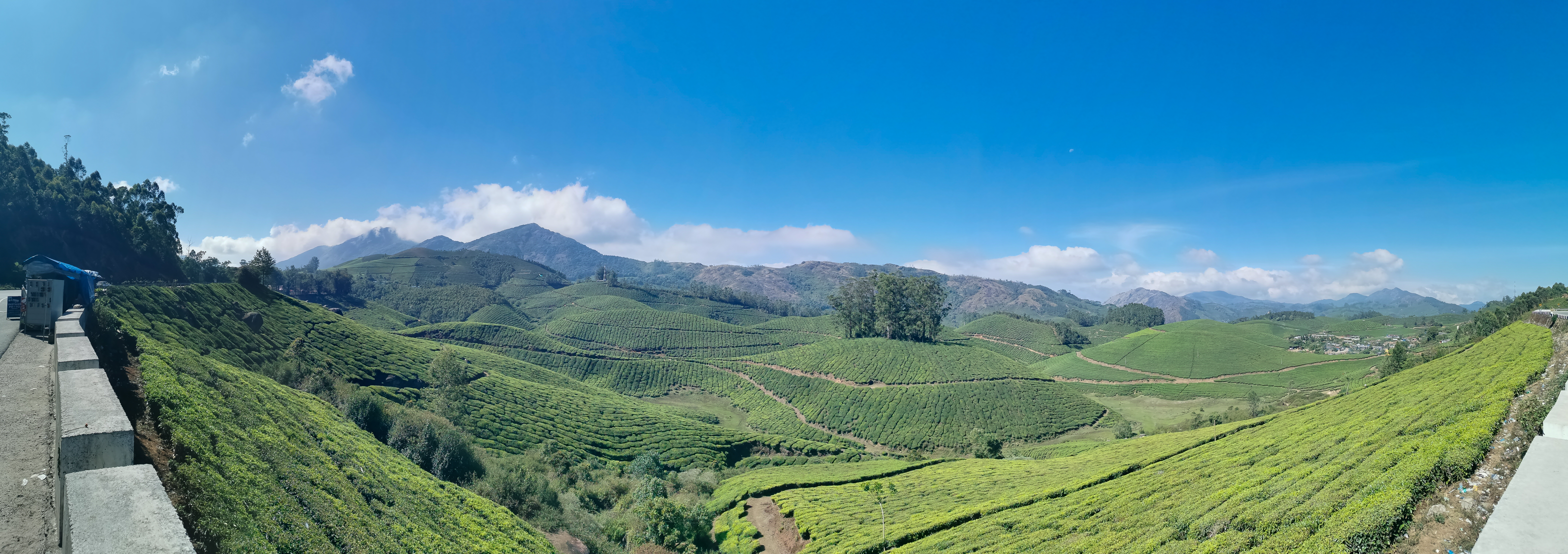
Tea plantations in Munnar. Taken from National Highway 85

Eventually roads were opened to the lowlands and in Bodinayakanur in western Madras Presidency, planters got provisions from a local headman - Suppan Chetty. He and his son, Alaganan Chetty (later an MLA) would continue providing supplies to the tea estates in the region. By 1894, 26 estates were established in the hills, but all were facing losses. In 1897, a separate company, Kannan Devan Hills Corporation (KDHC) was registered to operate the tea estates which was later taken over by the American Direct Tea Trading Company Ltd., who owned 26 estates, most with coffee and some with cinchona, almost all in the area except for a few in the lower areas.

In 1900, a ropeway was built and eventually monorails were installed for easier transport of goods to the plains. In 1901, P. R. Buchanan took over as General Manager and began the most extensive clearing of jungles for plantations. In 1908, construction started on a new railway which opened in 1909. By 1911, around 6,500 hectares (16,000 acres) of the region was under cultivation.

In 1924, a flood swept through Munnar, damaged the road and destroyed the rail track. In its place it was decided to create a ropeway to transport tea. In 1930, this in turn was replaced by a modern road that made transport much easier. By 1952, almost 11,000 hectares (28,000 acres) of land was under cultivation. After Independence, Indian planters took over. In 1964, the KDHC which owned most tea estates was acquired by Tata and Finlay who started the first instant tea factory in the country. In 1971, the Kerala government wanted to reforest all land in the hills not used for plantations. However, negotiations that followed resulted in Tata keeping most of the land, leaving it with 23,000 hectares (57,000 acres).

Most tea estate labourers are landless. In the early 2000s, the Viduthalai Chiruthaigal Katchi, a Dalit outfit from Tamil Nadu, started demanding land for the labourers, started making inroads into Kerala. In 2009, VS Achuthanandan promised his support for providing land to the mainly Tamil Dalit estate labourers. However, the process became very slow and as of 2018, most families still had no land.

The former Kunda Valley Railway in Munnar was destroyed by a flood in 1924, but in 2019 tourism officials were considering reconstructing the railway line to attract more tourists to the area.

== Geography ==
The region in and around Munnar varies in height from 1,450 metres (4,760 ft) to 2,695 metres (8,842 ft) above mean sea level. The temperature ranges between 5 °C (41 °F) and 25 °C (77 °F) in winter and 15 °C (59 °F) and 25 °C (77 °F) in summer. Temperatures as low as −4 °C (25 °F) have been recorded in the Sevenmallay region of Munnar.

Köppen-Geiger climate classification system classifies it as subtropical highland (Cwb).

Climate data for Munnar
Month	Jan	Feb	Mar	Apr	May	Jun	Jul	Aug	Sep	Oct	Nov	Dec	Year
Mean daily maximum °C (°F)	22.4 (72.3)	23.7 (74.7)	25.3 (77.5)	25.6 (78.1)	25.6 (78.1)	23.7 (74.7)	22.4 (72.3)	22.8 (73.0)	23.2 (73.8)	22.7 (72.9)	21.8 (71.2)	21.9 (71.4)	23.4 (74.2)
Daily mean °C (°F)	17.6 (63.7)	18.7 (65.7)	20.2 (68.4)	21 (70)	21.4 (70.5)	20.3 (68.5)	19.3 (66.7)	19.5 (67.1)	19.6 (67.3)	19.2 (66.6)	18.3 (64.9)	17.7 (63.9)	19.4 (66.9)
Mean daily minimum °C (°F)	12.9 (55.2)	13.7 (56.7)	15.1 (59.2)	16.5 (61.7)	17.3 (63.1)	16.9 (62.4)	16.3 (61.3)	16.3 (61.3)	16 (61)	15.7 (60.3)	14.8 (58.6)	13.5 (56.3)	15.4 (59.8)
Average precipitation mm (inches)	18 (0.7)	29 (1.1)	47 (1.9)	129 (5.1)	189 (7.4)	420 (16.5)	583 (23.0)	364 (14.3)	210 (8.3)	253 (10.0)	164 (6.5)	64 (2.5)	2,470 (97.3)
Average rainy days	2	2	3	6	8	9	10	9	10	12	8	5	84
Mean monthly sunshine hours	248	232	248	240	217	120	124	124	150	155	180	217	2,255
Source 1: Climate-Data.org, altitude: 1461m
Source 2: Weather2Travel for sunshine and rainy days

== Transportation ==
=== Road ===
Munnar is well connected by both National highways, state highways and rural roads. The town lies in the Kochi - Dhanushkodi National highway (N.H 49), about 130 km (81 mi) from Cochin, 31 km (19 mi) from Adimali, 85 km (53 mi) from Udumalaipettai in Tamil Nadu and 60 km (37 mi) from Neriyamangalam.

Distance from major cities & tourist destinations.

- Aluva - 109 km
- Varkala - 245 km
- Trivandrum - 280 km
- from Kochi - Ernakulam - 150 km

=== Railway ===
The nearest railway station is Bodinayakkanur (68 km) in Tamil Nadu and nearest major railway stations in Kerala are at Ernakulam (126 km) and Aluva (110 km).

Kerala State Road Transport Corporation (KSRTC) bus stand is in walking distance from Aluva Railway Station, and buses are available for Munnar every hour.

=== Airport ===
The nearest airport is Cochin International Airport, which is 110 kilometres (68 mi) away. The Coimbatore and Madurai airports are 165 kilometres (103 mi) from Munnar.

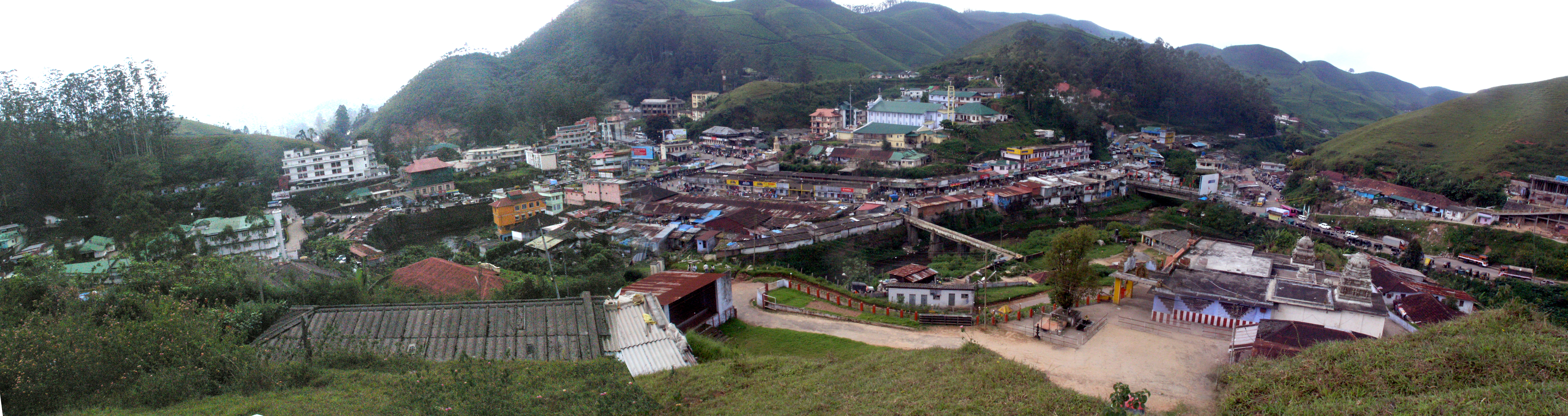
Downtown Munnar

== Administration ==
The Panchayat of Munnar formed on January 24, 1961, and it is divided into 21 wards for administrative convenience. Coimbatore district lies to the north, Pallivasal to the south, Devikulam and Marayoor to the east, and Mankulam and Kuttampuzha Panchayats to the west.

== Demographics ==
According to the 2011 Census, Munnar Grama Panchayat had a total population of 32,039. 16,061 were males and 15,968 were females, with 7,968 families total residing therein. Children represented in the age group of 0-6 were 2,916 (9.1% of the total population), which constitutes 1,478 males and 1,438 females. Munnar Panchayat had an overall literacy rate of 84.85%, substantially lower than the Kerala state average of 94.00%. Male literacy stands at 91.05% and female literacy at 78.64%.

== Flora and fauna ==
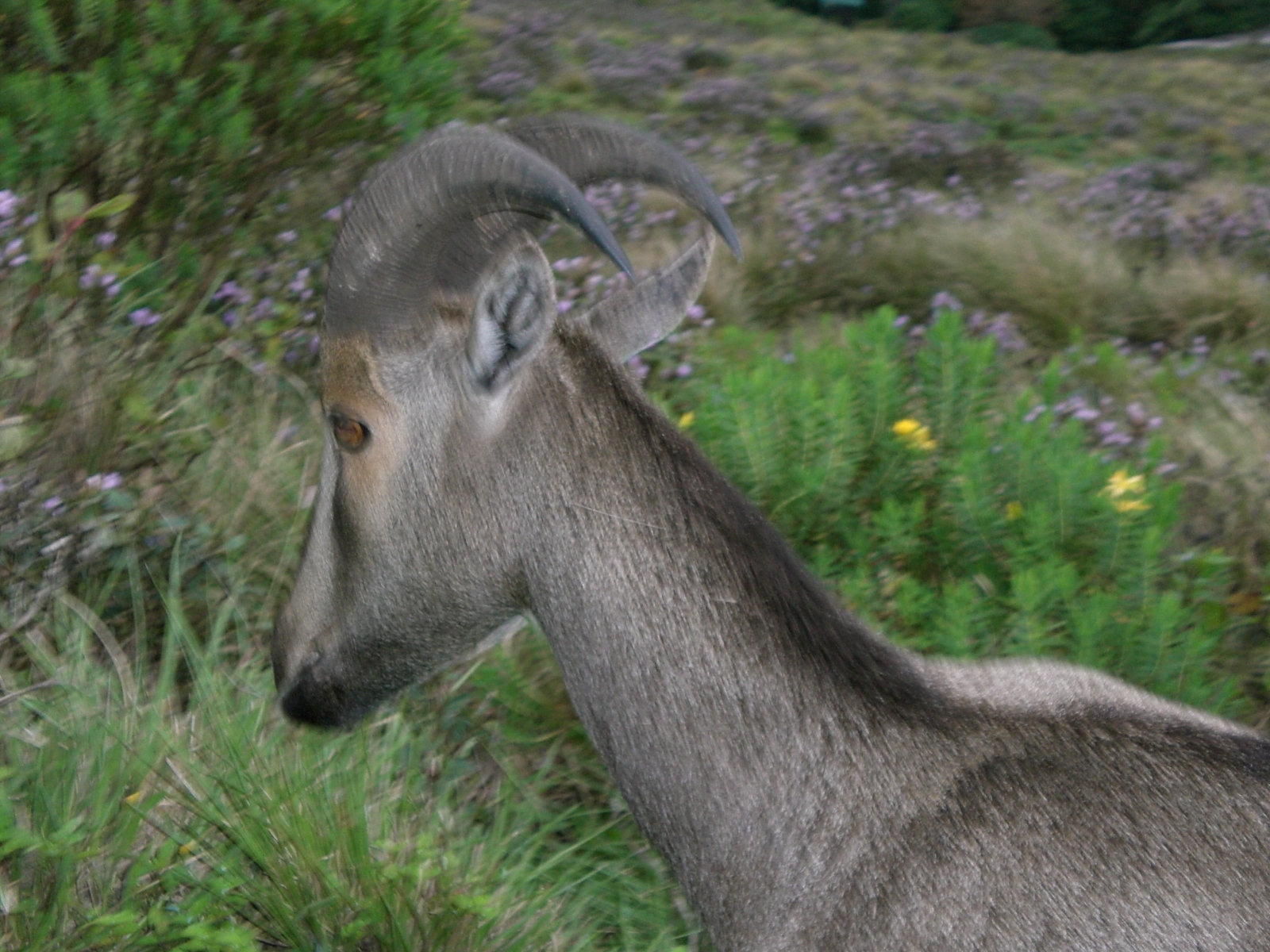
A Nilgiri tahr at Rajamalai near Munnar

Most of the native flora and fauna of Munnar have disappeared due to severe habitat fragmentation resulting from creation of the plantations. However, some species continue to survive and thrive in several protected areas nearby, including the new Kurinjimala Sanctuary to the east, the Chinnar Wildlife Sanctuary, Manjampatti Valley and the Amaravati reserve forest of Indira Gandhi Wildlife Sanctuary to the north east, the Eravikulam National Park and Anamudi Shola National Park to the north, the Pampadum Shola National Park to the south and the proposed Palani Hills National Park to the east.

=== Endemic species ===
These protected areas are especially known for several threatened and endemic species including Nilgiri Thar, the grizzled giant squirrel, the Nilgiri wood-pigeon, elephant, the gaur, the Nilgiri langur, the sambar, and the Neelakurinji (that blossoms only once in twelve years).

== Land ownership ==
There has been action to address the problems of property takeovers by the land mafia that have, according to successive governments, plagued the area. In 2011, the government estimated that 20,000 hectares (49,000 acres) of land had been illegally appropriated and launched a campaign of evictions that had first been mooted in 2007.

== Gallery ==
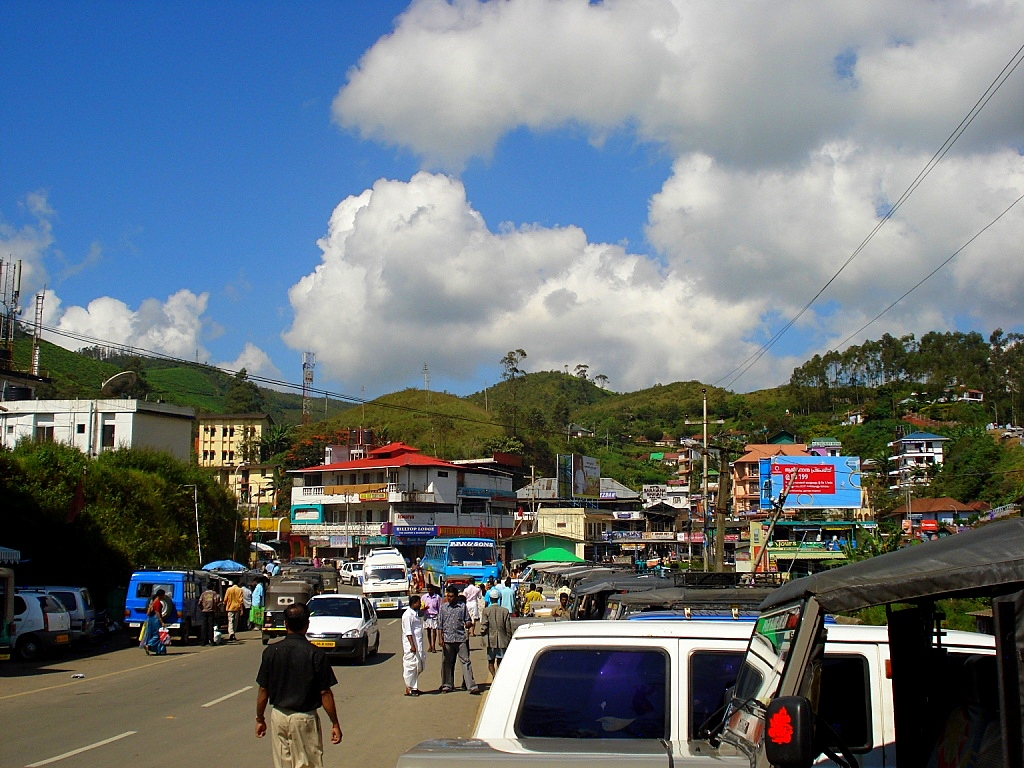
Downtown Munnar with State Highway 17

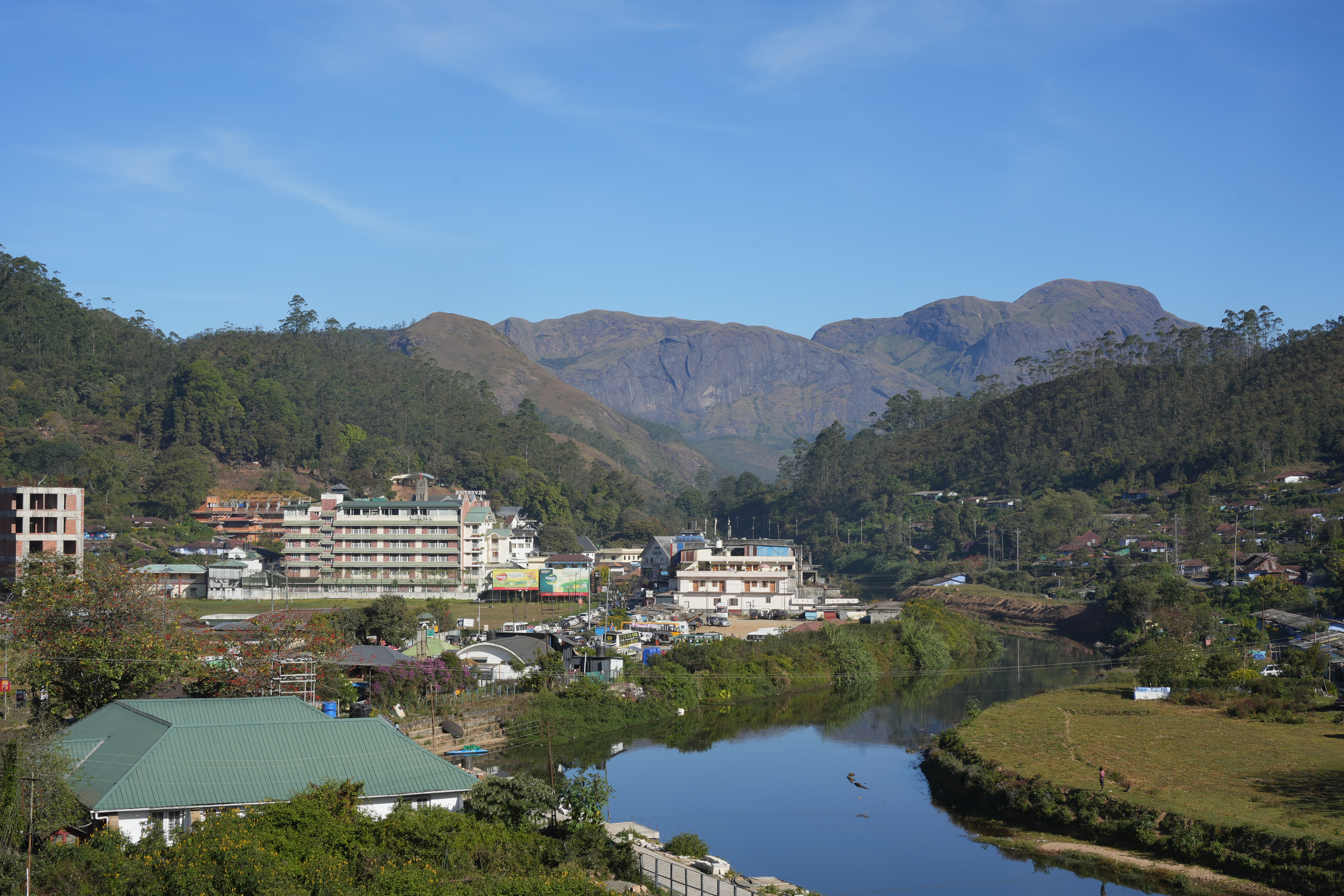
Muthirapuzha River with Anamudi mountain

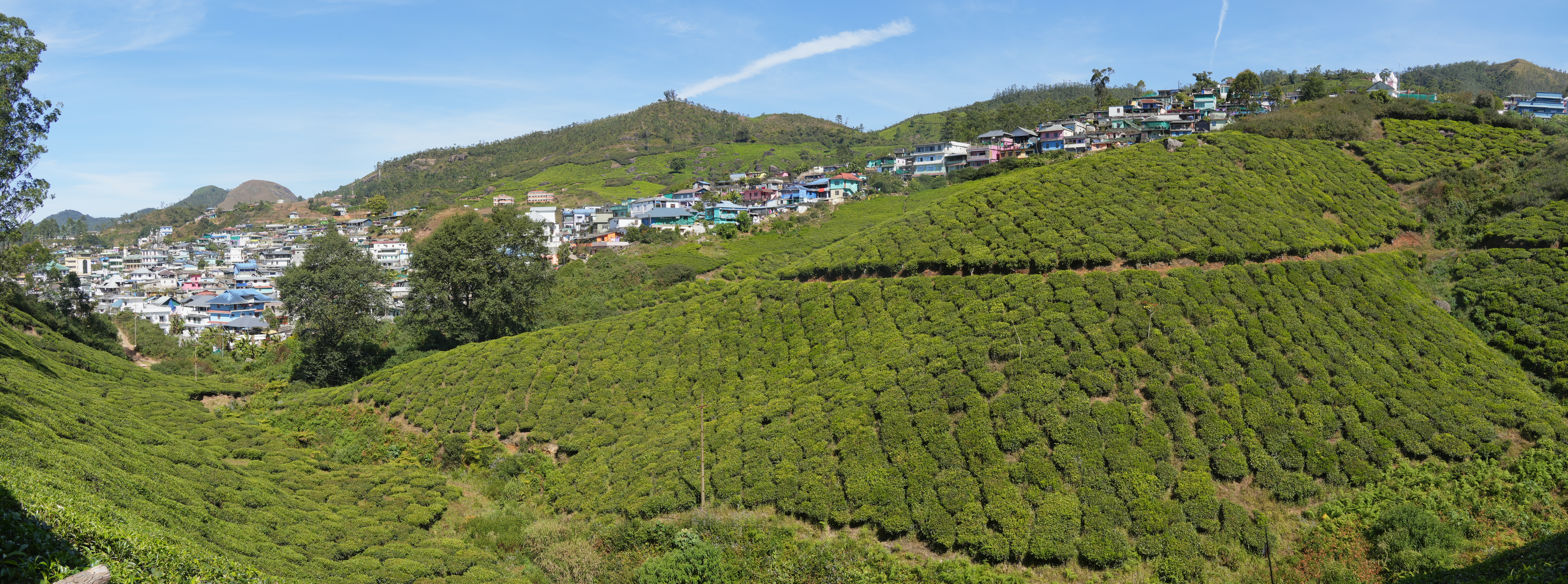
The town of Munnar from the neighbouring plantations

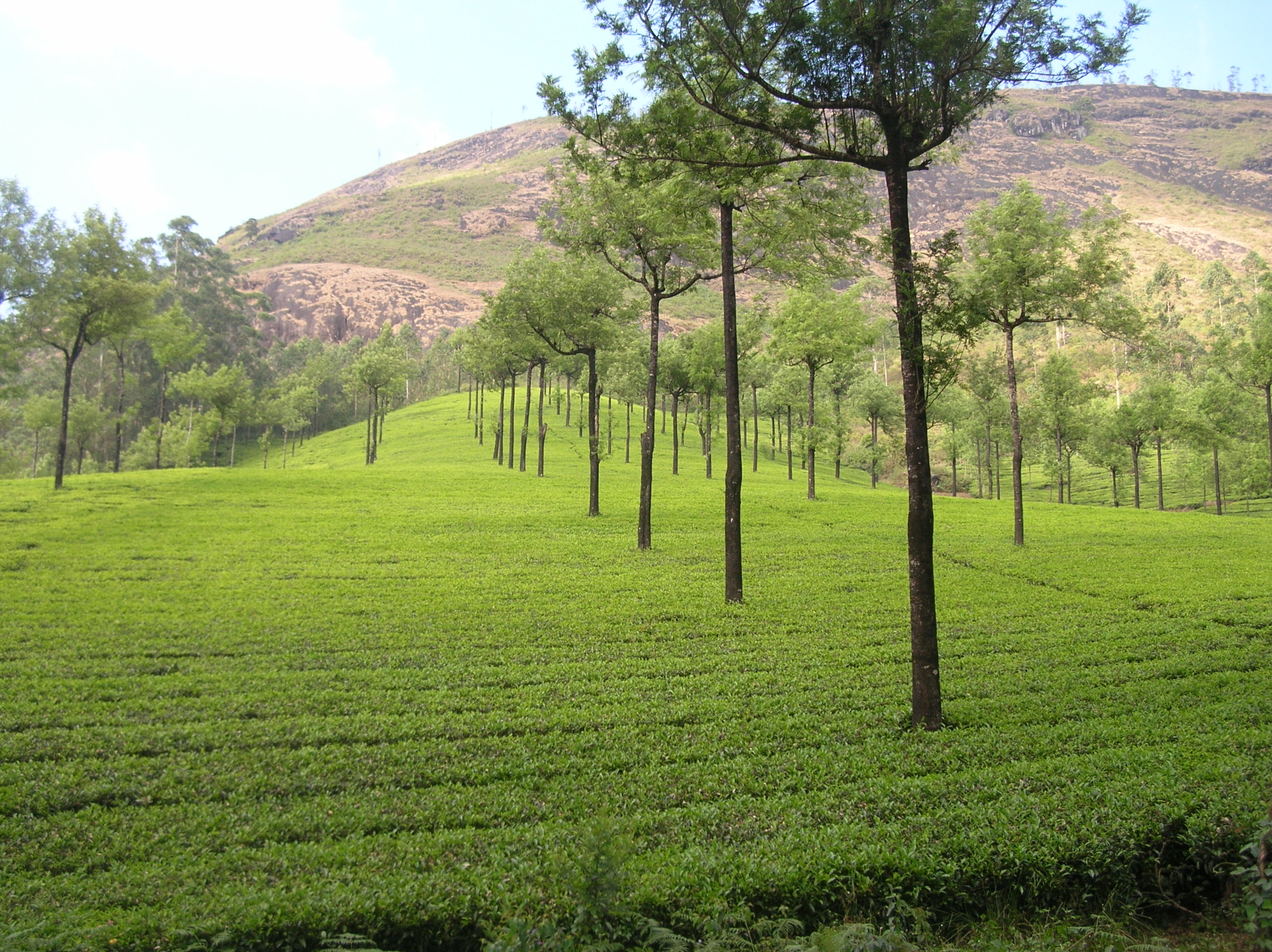
Famous tea plantations viewpoint in Munnar

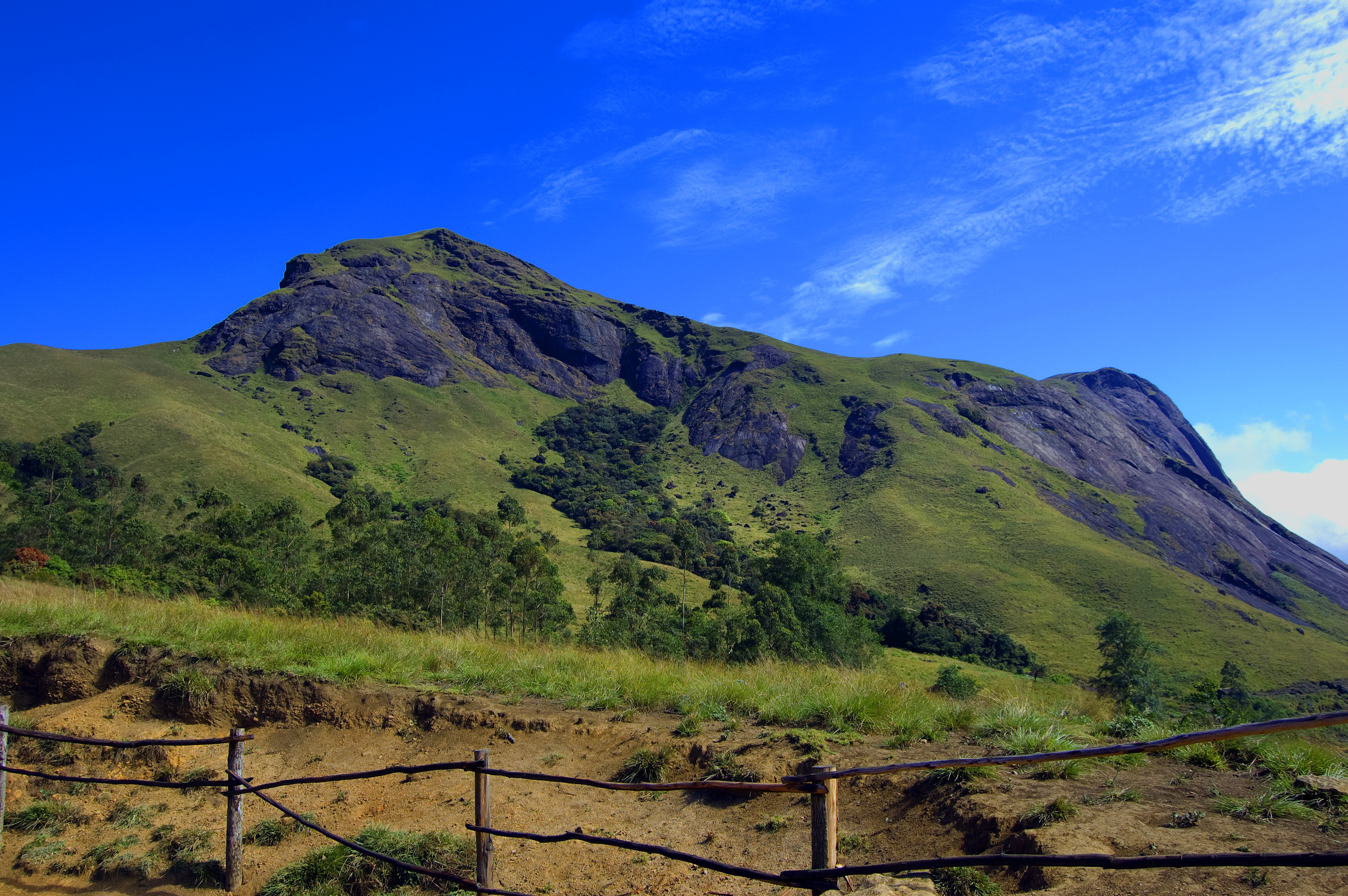
Eravikulam National Park

Munnar CSI Church

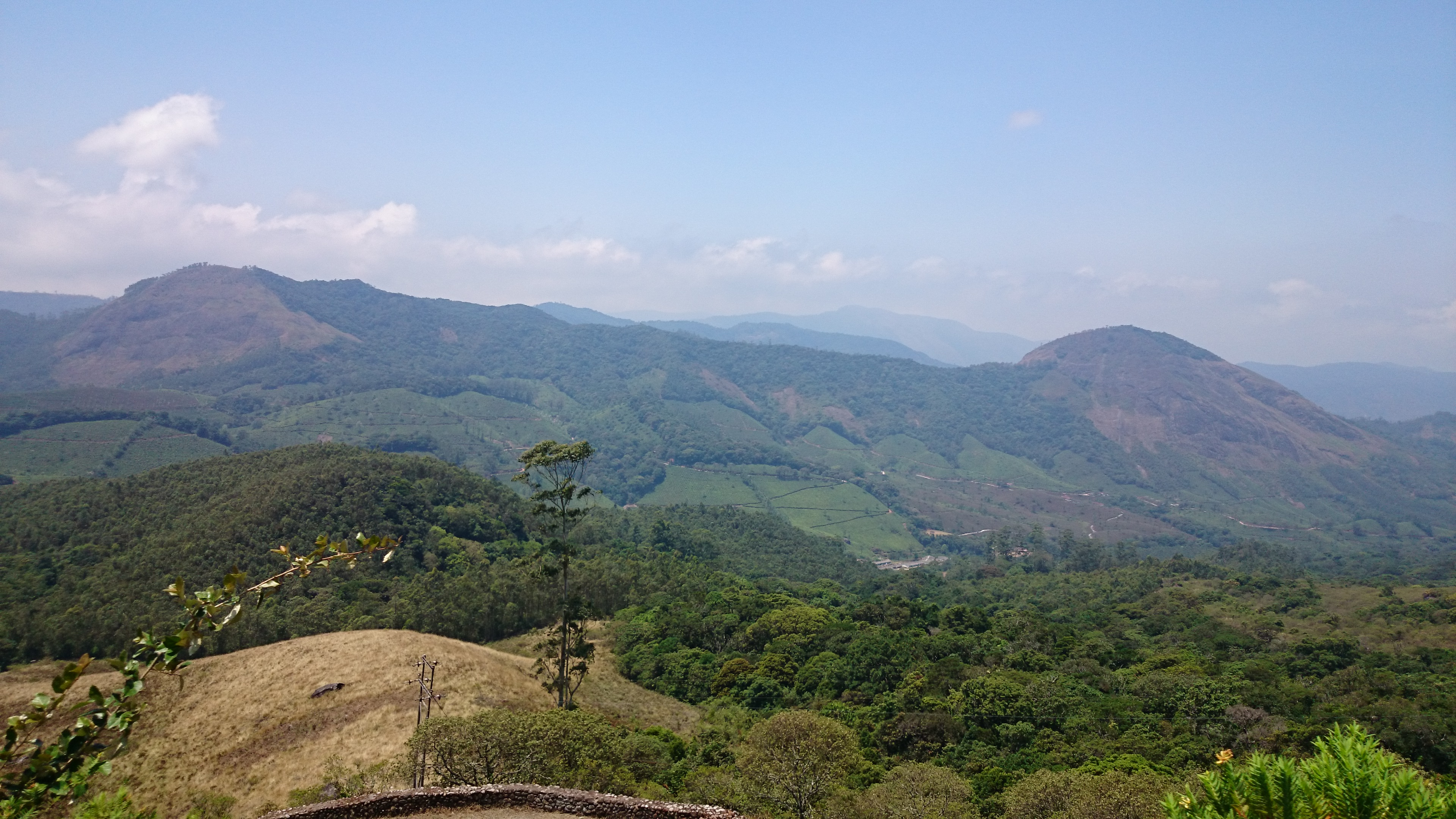
View from Eravikulam National Park Road

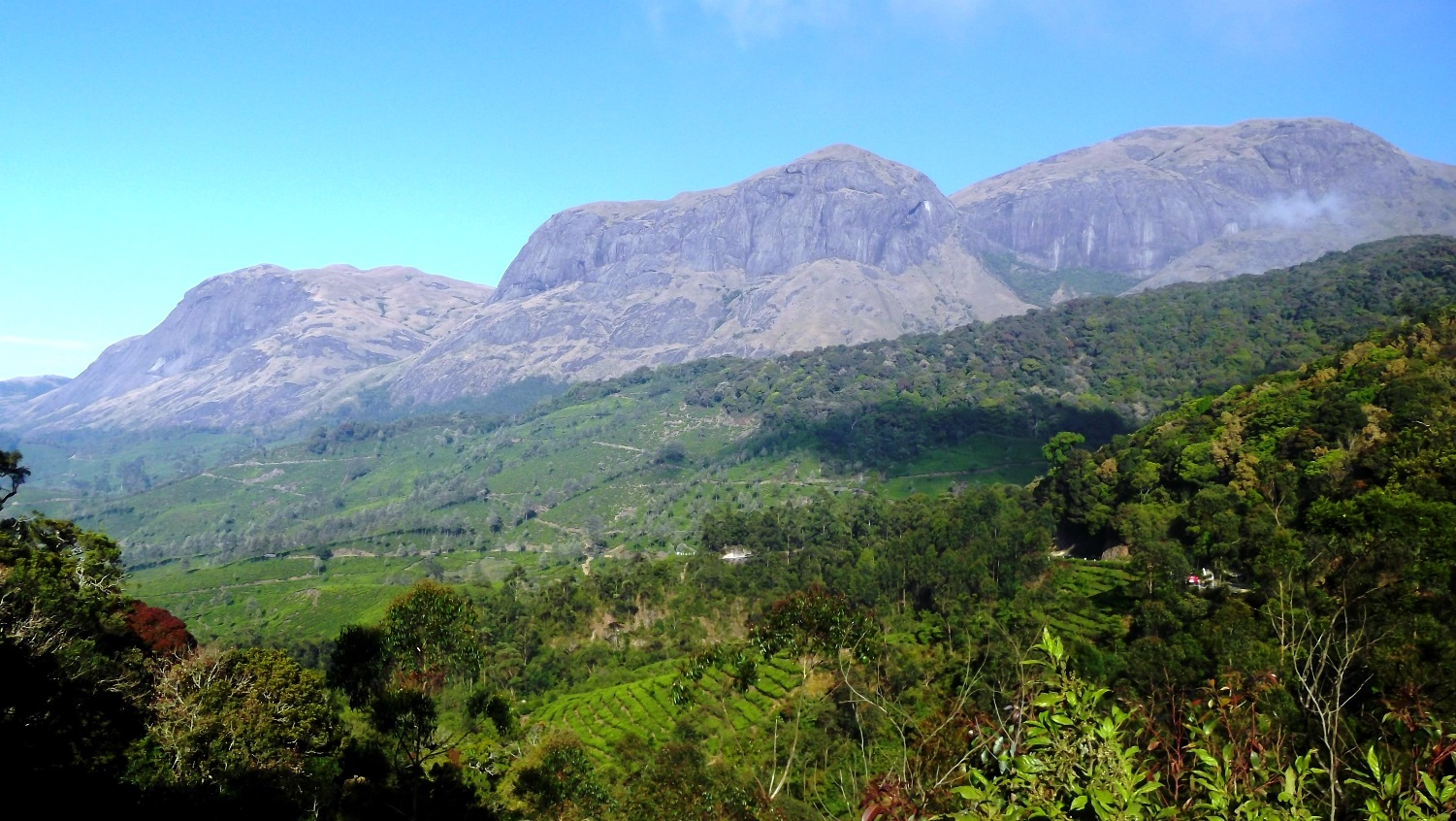
Anamudi with tea plantations

CSI cemetery in Munnar

== See also ==
- Bisonvalley
- Kunchithanny
- Marayur
- KDHP Tea Museum
- 2015 Munnar Plantation strike
- Rajakkad
