= Mullayar =

River in India

- Native name: മുല്ലയാർ (Malayalam)

Location
- Country: India

Physical characteristics
- Source
  - location: Kottamalai peak in the Periyar Tiger Reserve
- Mouth
  - location: Periyar at Mullakudy

Mullayar River is a tributary of the Periyar River, the longest river in Kerala. It originates at Kottamalai peak in the Periyar Tiger Reserve. The Mullayar flows west through the reserve and joins the Periyar at Mullakudy just at the beginning of the Periyar lake formed by the Mullaperiyar dam.

== See also ==
- Periyar - Main river

== Other major tributaries of Periyar river ==
- Muthirapuzha River
- Cheruthoni
- Perinjankutti
- Edamalayar
- Muttar River
