= Parakkadavu Weir =

Dam in Kerala, India

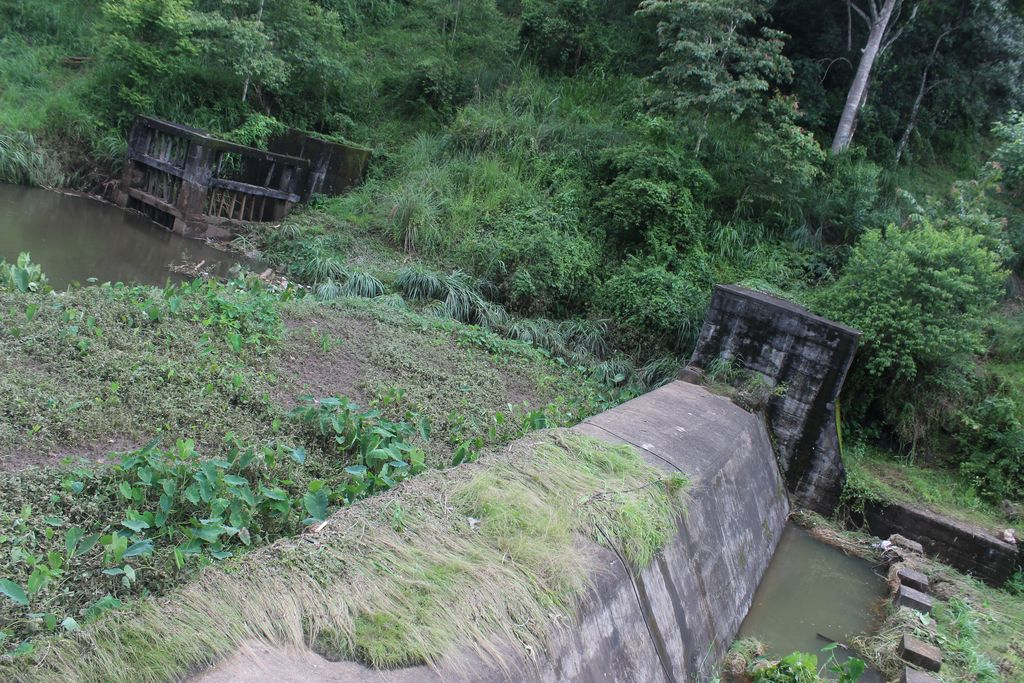
Parakkadavu Weir

Parakkadavu Weir (Malayalam: പാറക്കടവ് തടയണ) is a concrete diversion dam constructed across Parakkadavu river in Vellathooval panchayath of Vellathooval village in Idukki district of Kerala, India. Parakkadavu weir is constructed as a part of Panniar Augmentation Scheme. Spill water from R A Headworks in Mudirappuzha river is partly diverted at Ellackal through a tunnel to Parakkadavu weir. From Parakkadavu weir the water is diverted to Mullakkanam weir and from this weir to Ponmudi reservoir.

== Specifications ==
- Latitude: 10⁰ 0′ 39 ” N
- Longitude: 77⁰ 01′ 58” E
- Panchayath: Vellathooval
- Village: Vellathooval
- District: Idukki
- Type of DamConcrete
- Classification:Weir
- Maximum Water Level: (MWL)
- Full Reservoir Level (FRL): EL 722.3 m
- Storage at FRL: Diversion only
