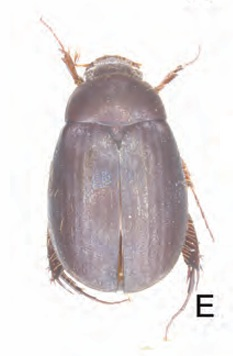

Scientific classification
- Kingdom: Animalia
- Phylum: Arthropoda
- Class: Insecta
- Order: Coleoptera
- Suborder: Polyphaga
- Infraorder: Scarabaeiformia
- Family: Scarabaeidae
- Genus: Maladera
- Species: M. anaimalaiensis

Binomial name
- Maladera anaimalaiensis Ahrens & Fabrizi, 2016

= Maladera anaimalaiensis =

Species of beetle

Maladera anaimalaiensis is a species of beetle of the family Scarabaeidae. It is found in India (Tamil Nadu).

== Description ==
Adults reach a length of about 8.2 mm. They have a dark brown, oblong-oval body. The antennae are yellowish. They are dull and the dorsal surface is nearly glabrous, except for some setae on the head.

== Etymology ==
The species name refers to its occurrence in the Anaimalai Hills.
