= Edamalayar =

Tributary of the Periyar river, Kerala, India

Edamalayar River
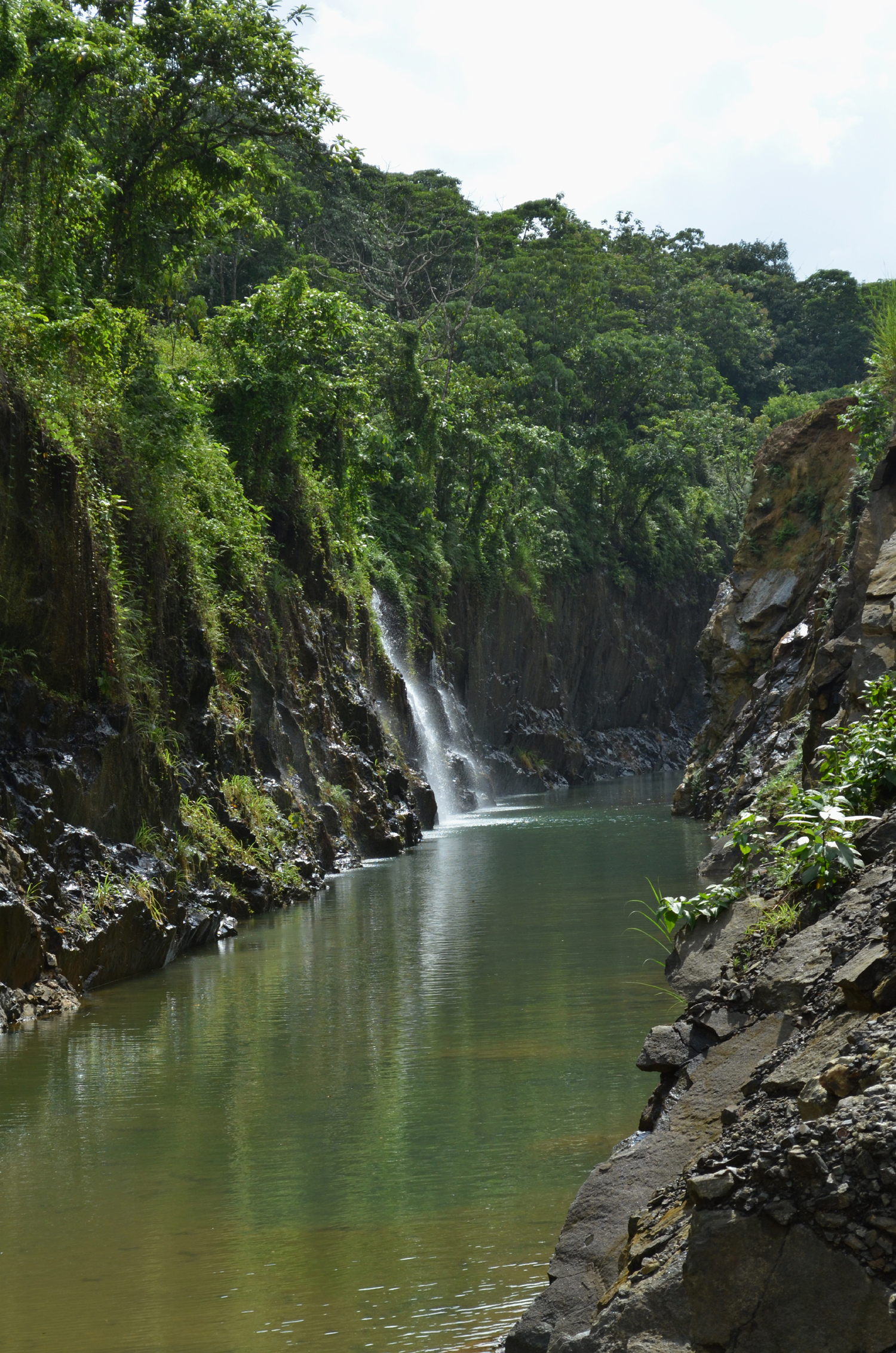
- A waterfall inside Edamalayar forest

- Location within Kerala Location within India

Physical characteristics
- Mouth
  - coordinates: 10.1647122°N 76.7344053°E

Basin features
- Progression: Periyar River

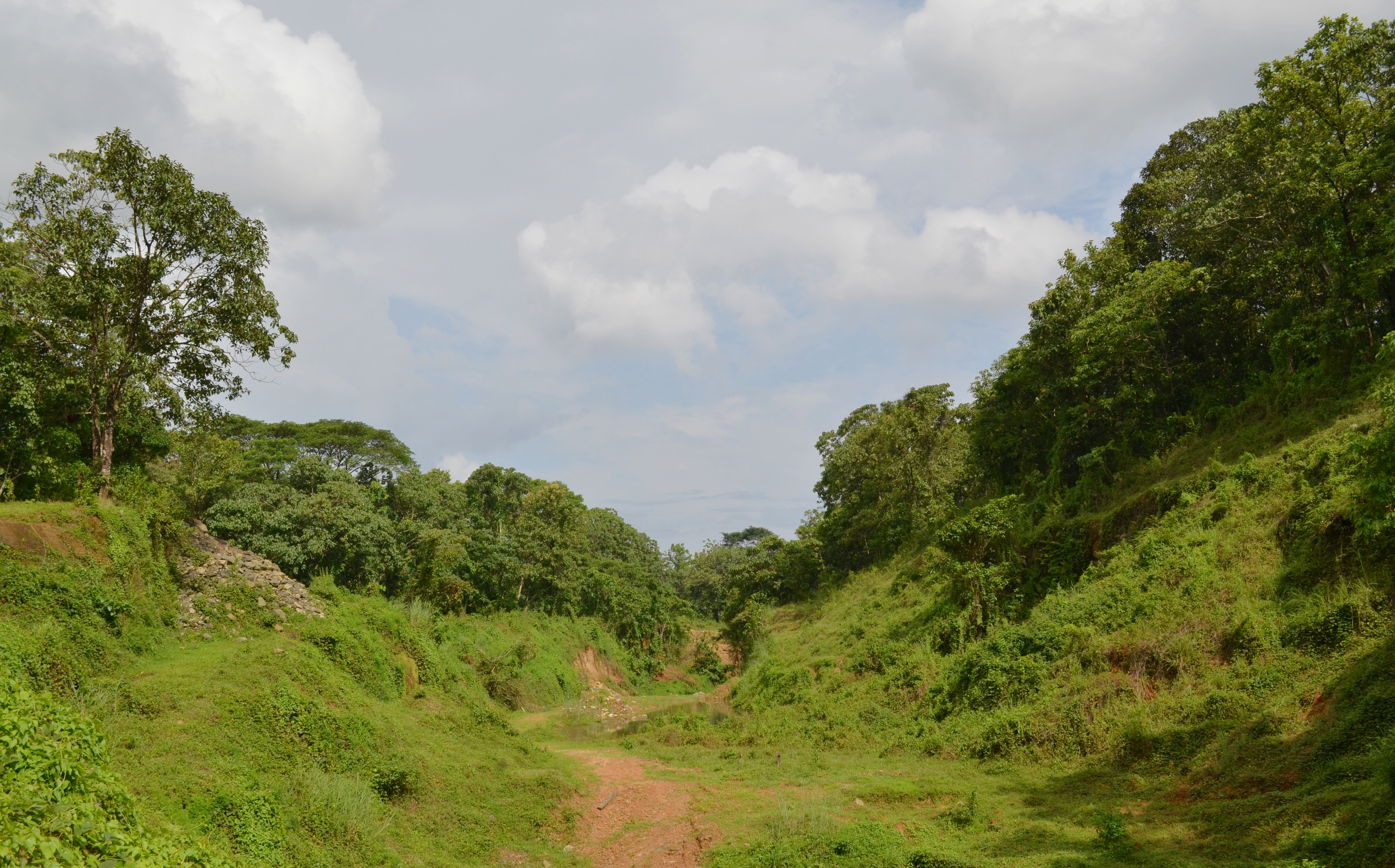
A view of Edamalayar Forest

Edamalayar or Idamalayar is one of the major tributaries of the Periyar River, the longest river in Kerala, India. The Idamalayar Dam is built on this river. It originates in the Anamalais of Kerala's Ernakulam district, and flows into Tamil Nadu before re-entering Kerala near Malakkappara and flowing into the Idamalayar Dam. The river joins the Periyar near Kuttampuzha.

== See also ==
- Periyar River - Main river

== Other major tributaries of Periyar river ==
- Muthirapuzha River
- Mullayar
- Cheruthoni
- Perinjankutti
