= Ramanamudalipudur =

Coordinates: 10°33′N 76°58′E

Ramanamudalipudur is a town situated in Coimbatore rural district, in the state of Tamil Nadu, India.

== Geography ==
Ramanudalipudur is situated near an abundance of wildlife. The region is home to animals such as panthers, crocodiles, tigers, elephants, spotted deer, civet cats, and wild boars. Numerous bird species can also be observed, including the Malabar pied hornbill, black-headed oriole, rocket-tailed drongo, tree pie, spotted dove, and red-whiskered bulbul. The town's name, which translates to "elephant hill," reflects its association with wildlife.

Located in Tamil Nadu's Coimbatore Hills district, the area's main attraction for tourists is its stunning natural beauty, characterized by the dense forest's varying shades of green. The town also boasts a fascinating history.

Ramamudalipudur is one of the eight sacred Jaina hills. Near the village lies a natural cavern containing numerous berths, both inside and outside. A Brahmi inscription on the outer wall dates back to the 1st or 2nd century, stating that the berths were gifts from Nathan of Karurattur in honor of three monks: Eri Aritian, Attuwa, and Arattakayipian. This is an unusual discovery, as the village was not known as a Jain center until the 9th century, when local devotees began carving stone sculptures into the rocks

== Climate ==
Ramanamudalipudur climate is quite moderate.

Summers (March to May) are bit hot with maximum temperature lies between 35 °C to 40 °C. However, this season is good for exploring the forest wildlife. Monsoons [June to September] are accompanied with medium to heavy rainfalls owing to southwest and northeast monsoons. Post-monsoons [October to November] offer maximum rainfalls in Ramanamudalipudur, the forests looks beautiful during rainy seasons. Winters (December to February) have an average temperature of about 20 °C, with minimum not going below 15 °C.

Best season to visit Ramanamudalipudur is June to March, tourists may avoid heavy rainy days.

- March to May Sanctuary may be closed and the season is good for other sight seeing.
- June to September is good for nature viewing and also to spot wild animals.
- October to November is heavy rainy season, only suitable for short trips.
- December to February is highly pleasant and excellent for all tourist activities.

== Religion ==
There are many temples in Ramanamudalipudur

== Transportation ==
Bus service is available from Pollachi to Ramanamudalipudur. They are S. B. S 17 & CTC 17.

== Education ==
- School

== Politics ==
Name	Position
R.S. Thangavel	Ex.MLA (VALPARAI) 1977-1980

Name	Position
V.Kasthoori Vasu	Union Chairman
R.M. Papathi	Ex Union Chairman

Panchayath Details

Name	Position
M.Dhanabakiyam	Panchayath President
R.U.Saravanan	Vice president

Details of Ex.Panchayath President

Sno	Name
1	M.Arumugasamy Chettiyar
2	R.K.Rangasamy Chettiyar
3	V.Kasturi Vasu
4	R.M.Pappathi

== See also ==
- Anaimalai Hills
