= Perinjankutti =

Perinjankutti River

Location
- Country: India

Perinjankutti River is one of the major tributaries of the Periyar River, the longest river in Kerala state of south India.

Pennaiyar River originates from Sivagiri hills in the Western Ghats. One of its four tributaries is Perinjankutti river. The other three are Muthirapuzha, Mullayar, Cheruthoni.

Tamil Nadu and Karnataka have disputes of water sharing over this river.

== See also ==
- Periyar River - Main river

=== Other major tributaries of Periyar river ===
- Muthirapuzha River
- Mullayar
- Cheruthoni
- Edamalayar
