= Muttar River =

Muttar River is a major distributary of Periyar flowing through Eranakulam District of Kerala. Malayalam:മുട്ടാർ. The river is a major source of water for Aluva, Choornikkara, Kalamassery, Kadungaloor, Alangad, Cheranalloor, Varapuzha and parts of Kochi corporation. The river has a length of 12 kilometers and an average width of 50 meters. Muttar river is currently under threat of pollution from nearby industries. Edappally Canal is a link between the two industrial hubs Udyogamandal and Ambalamugal. It connects the Muttar River on northern end and Chitrapuzha River on the Southern end.
