= Idamalayar Dam =

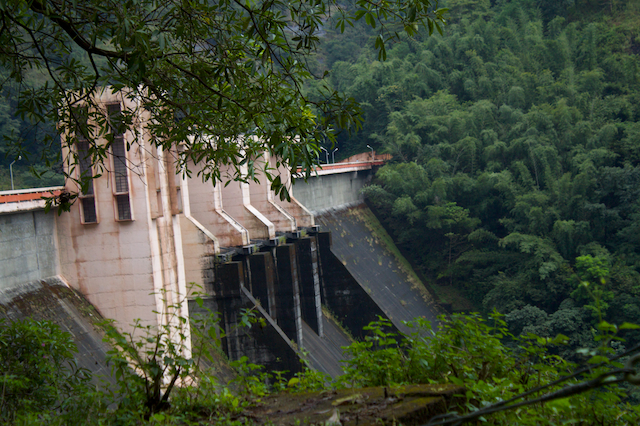
- Idamalayar Dam

- Location within India Location within Kerala
- Official name: Idamalayar Dam
- Country: India
- Location: Ernakulam District, Kerala
- Coordinates: 10°13′19″N 76°42′24″E
- Construction began: 1970
- Opening date: 1985
- Construction cost: Rs. 539.50 crores (US$1.199 billion)
- Owner: Kerala State Electricity Board

Dam and spillways
- Type of dam: Gravity dam
- Impounds: Edamalayar/Periyar river
- Height: 102.80 metres (337.3 ft)
- Length: 373 metres (1,224 ft)

Reservoir
- Creates: Idamalayar Reservoir
- Total capacity: 1.0898 cubic kilometres (0.2615 cu mi)
- Catchment area: 381 km^{2} (147 sq mi)
- Surface area: 28.3 km^{2} (10.9 sq mi)

Power Station
- Operator: Kerala State Electricity Board
- Turbines: 2 x 37.5 MW
- Installed capacity: 75 MW
- Annual generation: 380 GW·h

Idamalayar Dam is a multipurpose concrete gravity dam located at Ennakkal between Ayyampuzha and Bhoothathankettu in Ernakulam district of Kerala on the Idamalayar, a tributary of the Periyar River in Kerala, South India. The dam however extends east as far as Malakkappara. Completed in 1985, with a length of 373 metres (1,224 ft) and a height of 102.8 metres (337 ft), the dam created a multipurpose reservoir covering 28.3 km^{2} (10.9 sq mi) in the scenic hills of the Anamalais.

The reservoir storage is utilized by a hydroelectric power station which has an installed capacity of 75 MW with two units of 37.5 MW capacity, producing an annual energy output of 380 GW·h.

The large reservoir created by the Idamalayar Dam is operated by the Kerala State Electricity Board to augment its peak power generation requirements. The dam will benefit the Idamalayar Irrigation Development Project by diverting water released from the tail race channel of the Idamalayar power station.

== Geography ==
The Idamalayar Dam is located on the Idamalayar River, a tributary of the Periyar River in Kerala. Edamalayar originates in the Anamala Hills in Ernakulam district itself at elevation of 2,520 metres (8,270 ft). The river is a perennial source draining a catchment area of 381 km^{2} (147 sq mi) with a topography of high relief. The catchment receives annual rainfall of 6,000 millimetres (240 in), 90% of which occurs during the monsoon months of June to September.

The dam is located 81 kilometres (50 mi) from Ernakulam in Ernakulam district and 10–12 kilometres (6.2–7.5 mi) from the Bhoothathankettu dam (literal meaning in Malayalam language: "monster dam") on the Periyar River, which takes its name from local myths attributing its construction to demons who built it with the intention of submerging Thrikkariyoor temple.

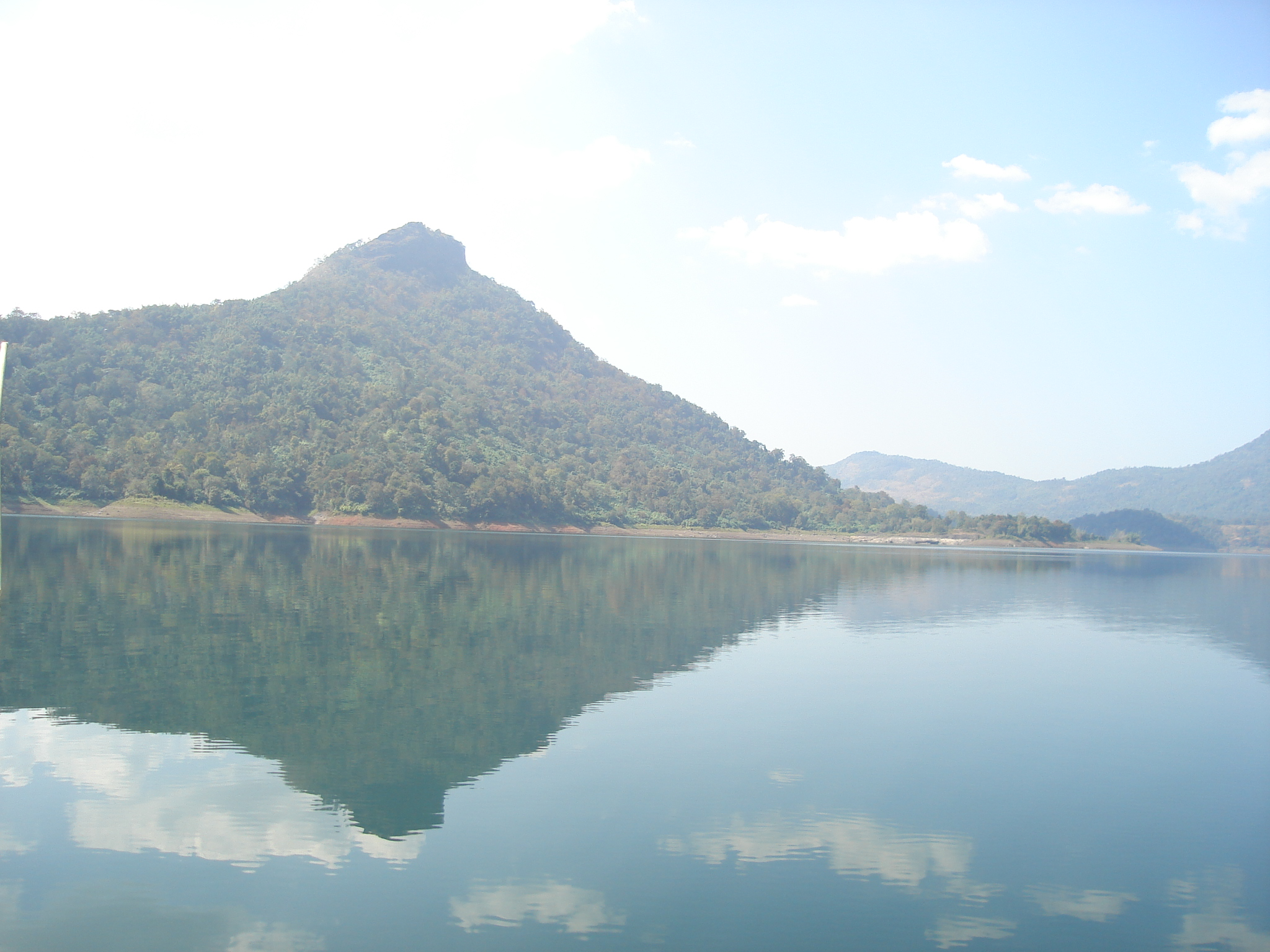
Reservoir area where birds are spotted

Dams in Periyar Basin

=== Water resources ===
Based on detailed hydrological analysis, with observed data supplemented by rainfall-runoff correlation and prediction of low flows during dry months, the mean annual runoff was estimated as about 1,207 million cubic meters (million cubic metres) and that at 95% availability as 730 million cubic metres. Therefore, the live storage in the reservoir was fixed at 1,032.3 million cubic metres. However, subsequent to the commissioning of the project in 1987, availability of the flows was reassessed. It was noted that flows reduced to 1,178 million cubic metres in dry season and reached 4,361 million cubic metres during the monsoon. The total annual flow was assessed as 5,539 million cubic metres. As irrigation requirements are not critical during monsoon season the assessment of dry weather flows is relevant for irrigation.

Further, Idamalayar storage is being supplemented from diversion of flows from the Peringalkuthu Reservoir during the monsoon season through the Vachumaram diversion canal constructed during 1997. The water stored in the reservoir is used for energy generation during the monsoon season by adopting a suitable reservoir operational schedule so that the water diverted from the diversion canal is not spilled out.

== Structural details ==
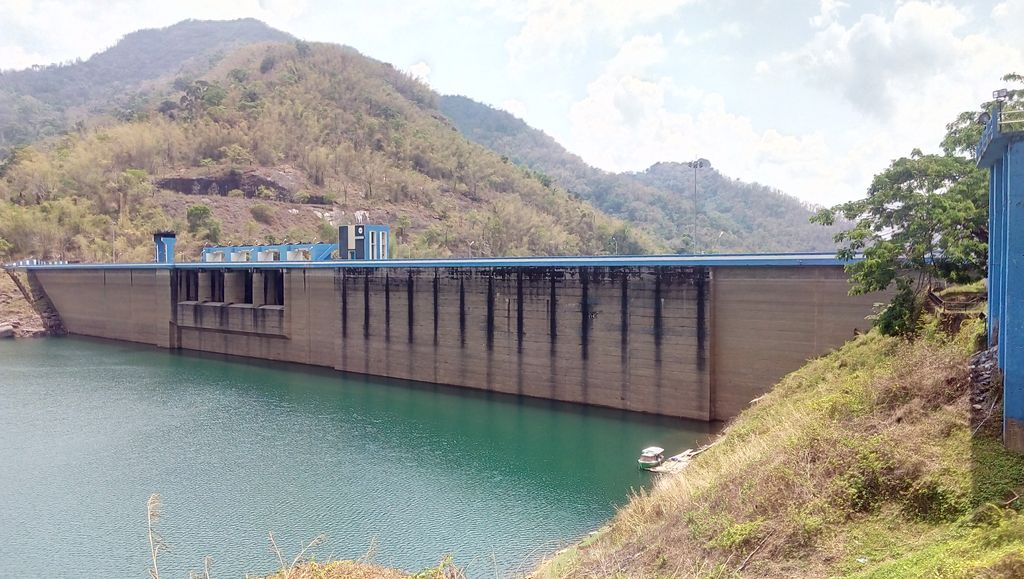
Upstream view of the dam from the reservoir

The dam built across the Idamalayar River is a gravity concrete structure with a total height of 102.80 metres (337.3 ft) above the deepest foundation level with a length of 373 metres (1,224 ft) at the crest level. The full reservoir level is elevation 169 metres (554 ft) and the minimum draw down level (MDDL) is 115 metres (377 ft). The dam has created a reservoir with a water spread of 28.3 km^{2} (10.9 sq mi). The reservoir has a gross storage capacity of 1,089.0 million cubic metres of which the effective storage is 1,017.8 million cubic metres. The spillway has been designed to pass a design flood discharge of 3,012.8 cubic metres per second (106,400 cu ft/s).

The storage in the reservoir created behind the high concrete gravity dam is utilized for power generation by diversion through a water conductor system comprising a 1,700 metres (5,600 ft) long power tunnel, surge shaft and two lines of penstocks connected to the turbines installed in a surface power station for generation of 75 MW of power with two units of 37.5 MW capacity each.

Instrumentation is provided in the Idamalayar Dam and the observations carried out are analysed regularly to monitor the safety of the structure. However, a rehabilitation project envisaging improving the safety and operational performance of selected structures such as dams, barrages and regulators, which covers 19 projects under the Irrigation Department and 12 projects of the Kerala State Electricity Board, has been approved under the World Bank funded "Dam Rehabilitation and Improvement Project (DRIP)" to be implemented from January 2011. Idamalayar Dam is one of the projects included in this programme. However, the rehabilitation work on this dam is proposed to be taken up in the second stage.

== Power Generation ==
Idamalayar project is a low head Hydro Electric Scheme located in Ernakulam District. The power house is situated downstreams of the dam. Installed capacity of the Project is 75 MW. It is in the fifth position in Kerala in terms of Installed capacity. There is a power tunnel of 1,700 metres (5,600 ft) length from where 2 penstock pipes takes the water to the power house. Two generators of 37.5 MW capacity produce the electricity. The units were commissioned in 1987 February. They generate 380 Million Units of power annually. There are two feeders from this Power house. First one is to Chalakudy and to Madakkathara from there and the second one is to Malayattur, perumbavur and joins the power grid in Kalamassery.

=== Irrigation benefits ===
Irrigation benefits from the water stored in the Idamalayar Reservoir are proposed by utilizing the tail-race water released from the Idamalayar Power house. For this purpose, the project titled "The Idamalayar Irrigation Project" is under implementation. Under this project, the tail race discharge from the Idamalayar powerhouse is picked up at the barrage constructed across the Periyar River at Bhoothathankettu and diverted through a canal system on the right bank of the barrage. The irrigation benefits envisaged covers an area of 14,394 hectares (35,570 acres) of wet and dry agricultural lands, out of which the cultivable command area is 13,209 hectares (32,640 acres). The project is under implementation since 1981. The cost of the project was initially Rs 18.5 crores (about US$411.11 million), which as per latest reports of 2007 is stated to be Rs. 539.50 crores (US$1198.9 million). According to the Annual Plan 2010–2011 of the State Government, substantial work of the main canal, the low level canal and the link canal still needs to be completed to derive full planned benefits of irrigation.

Apart from power and irrigation benefits, the project situated in scenic forest area also provides recreational benefits of boating in the reservoir, bird watching and trekking.

== Construction delays ==
The Idamalayar Dam project was started in 1970 and completed after 17 years. In an analysis carried out in 2001 on the reasons for the delay in completion of Hydropower Projects resulting in immense cost overruns in Kerala, it was noted that the Idamalayar project could be commissioned only in 1987 with a time overrun of 9 years and consequent cost overrun of 285% resulting in a capital cost of Rs 2.81 per kWh of generation. While technical reasons for the delays were fully documented, the delay highlighted, however, was attributed to the "irrational behaviour of the organized militant labour". A High Level Committee set up by the Government of Kerala, which examined this issue, observed that the Idamalayar Dam project has been the "victim of recurring and long inertial periods of labour unrest".

There was also controversy over the contract awards. The government appointed Justice K. Sukumaran to inquire into allegations related to the Idamalayar and Kallada dam construction contracts. Based on his report, Minister R. Balakrishna Pillai and others were prosecuted by a Special Court. The Kerala high court later acquitted them, but in February 2011 the Supreme Court of India sentenced R. Balakrishna Pillai and two others to a year in prison for abusing their positions when awarding the contracts.

== Birds ==
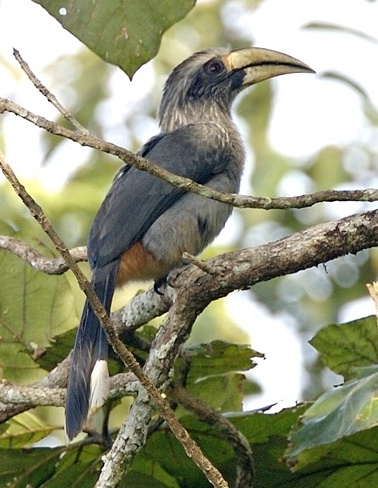
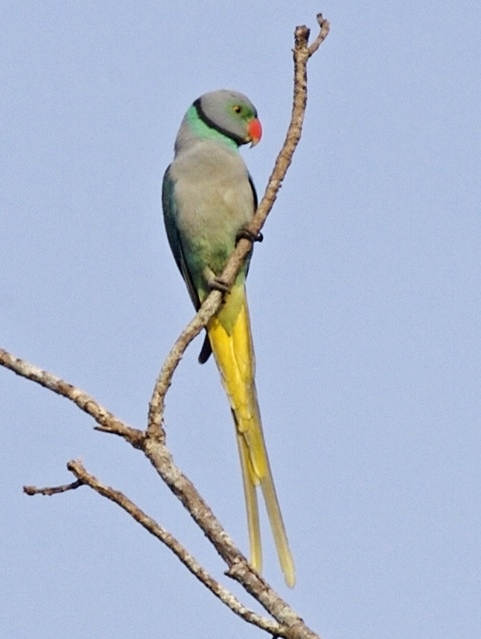
Left: Malabar grey hornbill of the Western Ghats. Right: Malabar parakeet

In the reservoir area of the Idamalayar Dam, several species of birds have been reported. The reservoir and surrounding areas are very rich in bamboo. The birds found are: heart-spotted woodpecker, common flameback, black rumped flameback, greater flameback, crimson-fronted barbet, Malabar grey hornbill, Malabar trogon, dollarbird, Oriental dwarf kingfisher, stork-billed kingfisher, common hawk cuckoo, plum-headed parakeet, Malabar parakeet, white-rumped needletail, brown-backed needletail, jungle owlet, green imperial pigeon, emerald dove, grey-fronted green pigeon, river tern, brahminy kite, hornbill, grey-headed fish eagle, black eagle, Oriental honey buzzard, rufous-bellied hawk-eagle, little heron, Asian openbill, fairy bluebird, small minivet, bar-winged flycatcher-shrike, black-naped monarch, Asian paradise flycatcher, Malabar whistling thrush, rusty-tailed flycatcher, white-bellied blue-flycatcher, Indian blue robin, chestnut-tailed starling, velvet-fronted nuthatch, great tit, dusky crag martin, red-rumped swallow, Asian koel, yellow-browed bulbul, Wayanad laughingthrush, dark-fronted babbler, rufous babbler, Nilgiri pipit, yellow-billed babbler, brown-cheeked fulvetta, plain flowerpecker, crimson-backed sunbird, and little spiderhunter. white bellied wood pecker
