= S. Sitaraman =

Indian environmentalist (1946-2020)

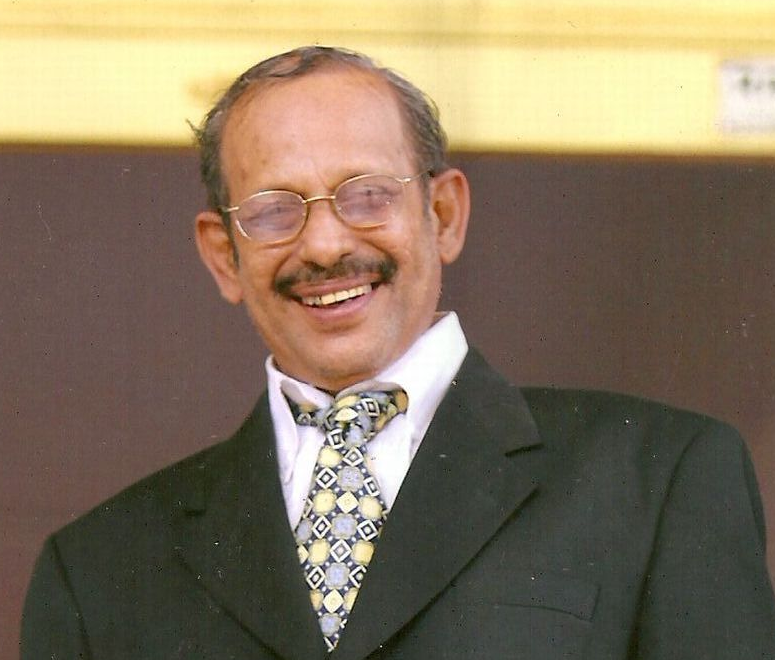
- Born: Sitaraman Sankaranarayana Iyer; 4 May 1946; Koovappady, Ernakulam
- Died: 9 December 2020 (aged 74)
- Education: Maharaja's College, Ernakulam; Sree Sankara College

Sitaraman Sankaranarayana Iyer (4 May 1946 – 9 December 2020), also known as S. Sitaraman was an environmentalist and teacher from Aluva, Kerala, India. He has been active in the protection of rivers, water bodies and forests of Kerala. He is best known for his campaign on the protection of river Periyar and is the founder of e.g. the All-Kerala River Protection Council. He died on 9 December 2020 aged 74.

== Early life ==
Sitaraman was born on 4 May 1946 in Koovappady, Ernakulam district, Kerala. He obtained his undergraduate (BSc) degree in chemistry from Sree Sankara college, Kalady and graduated with MSc degree from Maharaja's college, Cochin, Kerala in 1969.

== Professional life ==
He joined the department of chemistry at Sree Sankara College, Kalady as a lecturer in 1970 and later on became the head of the Department of Chemistry in 1996 and held this position for six years until retirement. Sitaraman then became the head of science and humanities at Adi Shankara Institute of Engineering and Technology (ASIET) from 2001 to 2011.

== Environmental activities ==
His most recognized work is regarding the protection of river Periyar. He led the afforestation programme along the banks of Periyar (river) at Aluva Shivratri Manappuram, to prevent the excessive soil erosion at the confluence of its tributary, Mangalapuzha. The project was initiated in 1987 under Integrated Development of Kochi scheme with small amount of funding from the Science and Technology Department.

Sitaraman has also extensively studied heavy metal contamination and water quality of Periyar (river) at several locations along its course and has suggested critical measures to prevent water pollution and illegal sand mining. He is actively involved in environment awareness programmes in high schools around Kochi area and is also the chairman of the Western Ghat Protection Council.

== Books ==
Sitaraman has coauthored several books and reports and is also the managing editor of Jalatharanagam publication.

His books include The Periyar Action Plan submitted to the Kerala state government in 1997, and Periyar, Keralathinte Jeevanadi coauthored with Dr. C. M. Joy.

== Awards and honors ==
- Down to Earth "Joseph C. John" National Award (2007)
- Paristhithi Ratna Award (2011)
