= Vellathooval Dam =

Dam in Kerala, India

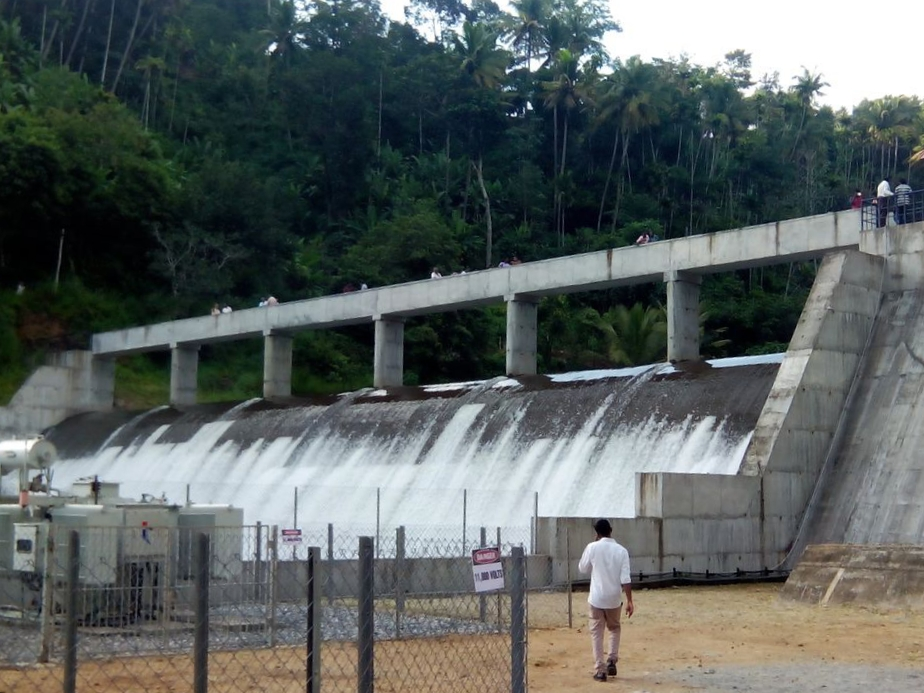

- Location within Kerala Location within India
- Country: India
- Location: Idukki, Kerala
- Coordinates: 9°58′27″N 77°01′40″E
- Purpose: Power
- Status: Operational
- Opening date: 2016
- Owner: Kerala State Electricity Board

Dam and spillways
- Type of dam: Gravity dam
- Impounds: Muthirapuzha river
- Height (foundation): 16 m (52 ft)
- Length: 75 m (246 ft)
- Elevation at crest: 472 m (1,549 ft)
- Spillway type: Ungated

Reservoir
- Normal elevation: 472 m (1,549 ft)

Vellathooval Power House
- Coordinates: 9°58′26″N 77°01′40″E
- Operator: Kerala State Electricity Board
- Turbines: 2 × 1.8 MW
- Installed capacity: 3.6 MW
- Website; KSEB - Official website

Vellathooval Dam is a diversion dam built on the Muthirappuzha river in Vellathooval village in Devikulam taluk of Idukki district in Kerala, India. The height of the dam from the deepest foundation is 16 metres (52 ft) and length is 75 metres (246 ft). Water from the Sengulam Power House and from the Muthirapuzha river gets released to the Vellathooval dam. Water from this dam is diverted through a canal system to the powerhouse near Panniyar After the water flow is used to generate hydroelectricity, the water is released back into the river. The dam is one of the major tourist attractions in the Idukki District, Kerala.

== Specifications ==
- Latitude : 10⁰ 0′ 39 ” N
- Longitude: 77⁰ 01′ 58” E
- Panchayath : Vellathooval
- Village : Vellathooval
- District : Idukki
- River Basin : Muthirappuzha
- River : Muthirapuzha
- Release from Dam to river : Muthirappuzha
- Year of completion : 2016
- Name of Project : Vellathooval Small H E P
- Type of Dam Concrete – gravity
- Classification : Weir
- Maximum Water Level (MWL) : EL 474.80 m
- Full Reservoir Level ( FRL) EL 472.0 m
- Storage at FRL: 0.069 Mm3
- Height from deepest foundation : 16 m
- Length: 75 m
- Spillway : Ungated
- Crest Level : 472.00 m
- River Outlet : 1 No. Circular type, 1.00 m dia.
