= Muthirapuzha River =

River in Kerala, India

Muthirapuzha
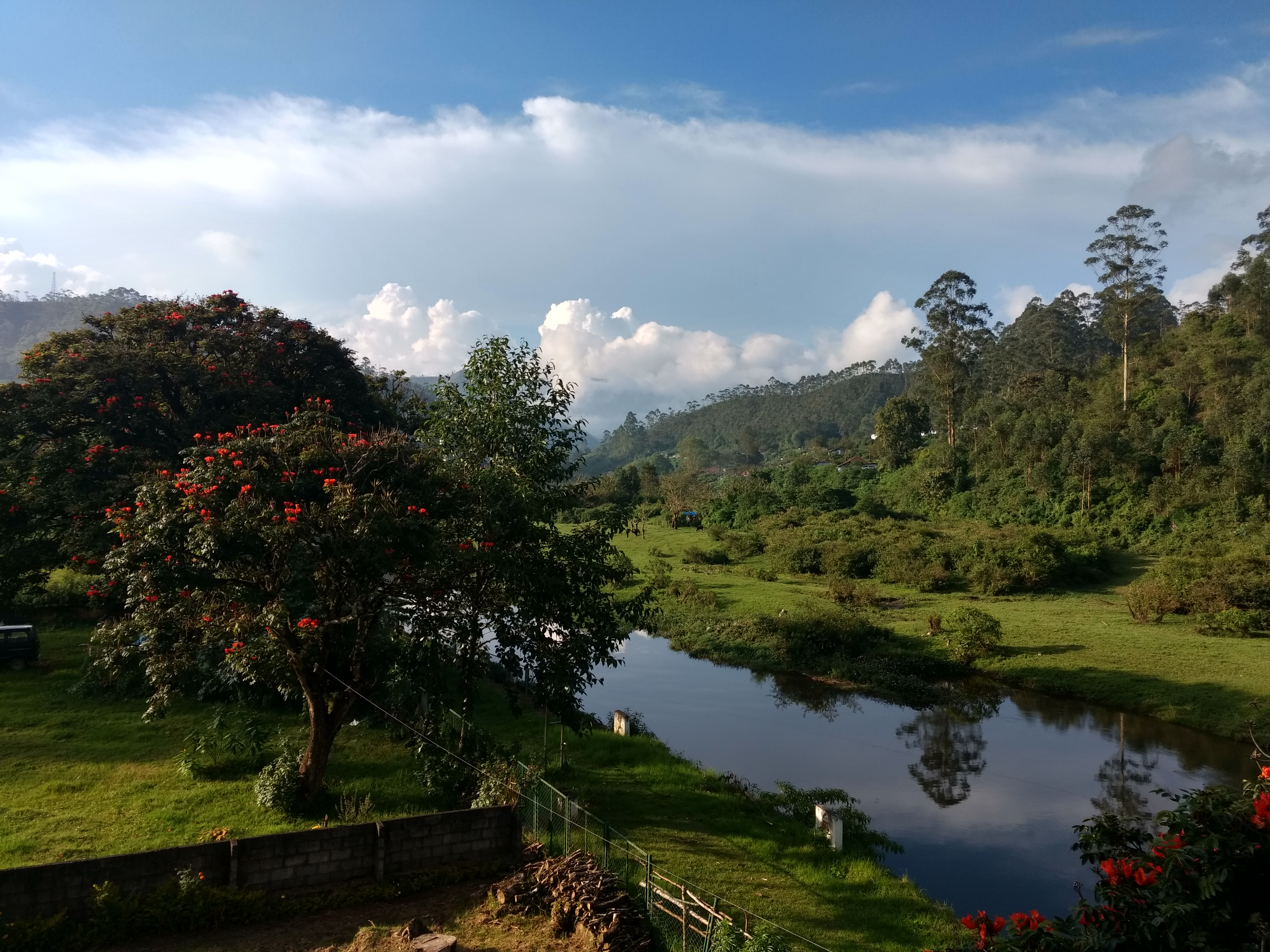
- River flowing through Munnar

Location
- Country: India

Muthirapuzha River is one of the major tributaries of the Periyar River, the longest river in Kerala state south India. It begins in remote forests above the Pooyamkutty- Edamalayar valley in Ernakulam district of Kerala, and joins the Periyar at Kunchithanny.

A hand shaped rock emerged after the 2020 floods that attracted people.

== See also ==
- Periyar River - Main river

== Other major tributaries of Periyar river ==
- Mullayar
- Cheruthoni
- Perinjankutti
- Edamalayar
