= Anaimalai Hills =

Mountain range in India

Anamala Hills Elephant Hills
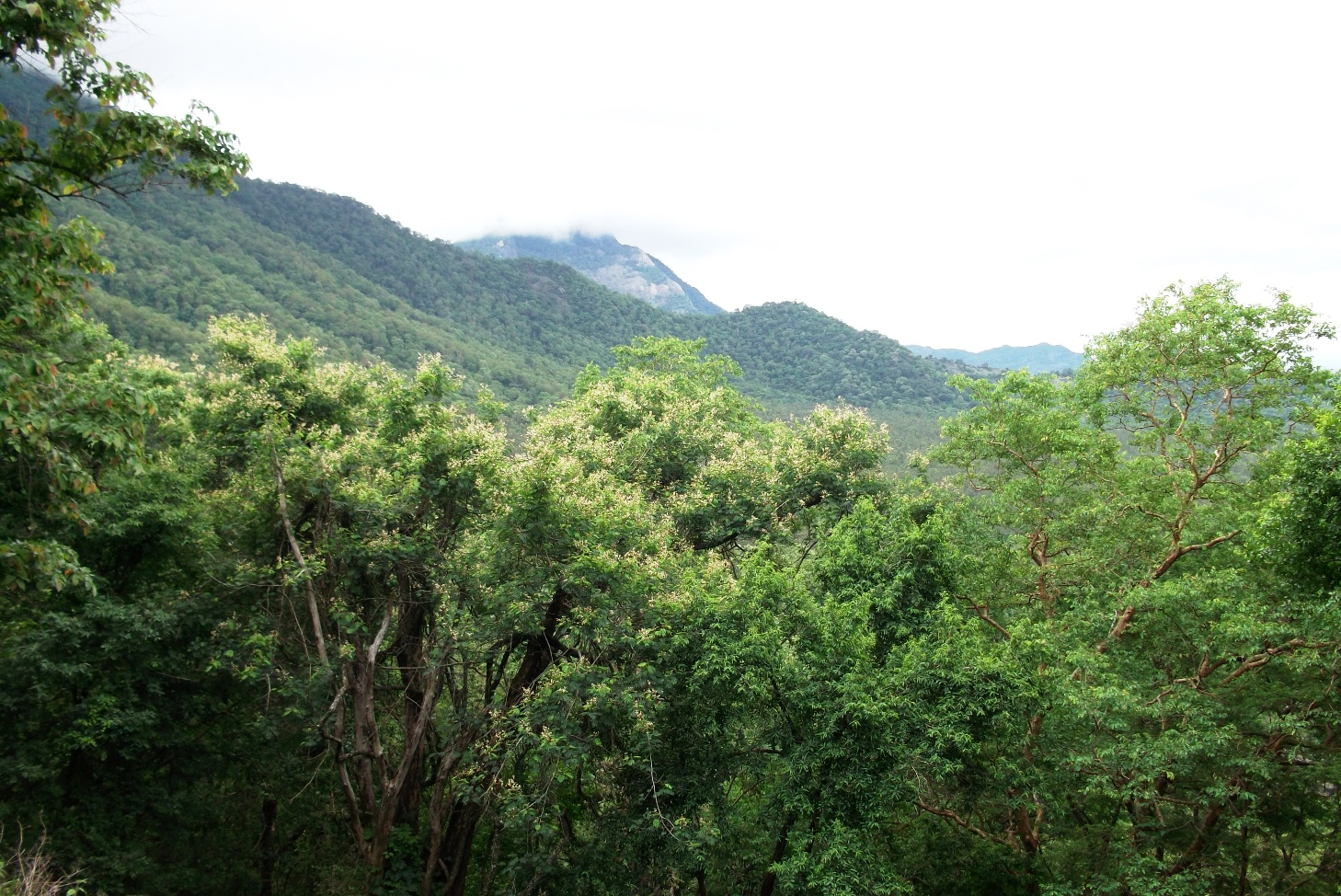

Highest point
- Peak: Anamudi, Kerala
- Elevation: 2,695 m (8,842 ft)
- Coordinates: 10°12′56.0″N 76°52′39.3″E 10°12'56.0"N 76°52'39.3"E

Geography
- Location within Kerala
- Country: India
- States: Kerala; Tamilnadu
- Range coordinates: 10°10′12.0″N 77°03′40.9″E10°10'12.0"N 77°03'40.9"E
- Parent range: Western Ghats
- Topo map: (Terrain)

Geology
- Rock age(s): Cenozoic; 100 to 80 mya
- Rock type: Fault

The Anamala or Anaimalai, also known as the Elephant Mountains, are a range of mountains in the southern Western Ghats of central Kerala (Idukki district, Ernakulam district, Palakkad district, Thrissur district) and span the border of western Tamil Nadu (Coimbatore district and Tiruppur district) in Southern India. The name anamala is derived from the Malayalam word aana and the Tamil word yaanai, meaning elephant, or from tribal languages. Mala or Malai means 'mountain', and thus literally translatable as 'Elephant mountain'.

Anamudi Peak (8,842 feet (2,695 metres)) lies at the southern end of the range and is the highest peak in southernmost India. The Palakkad Gap is the mountain pass which divides it from the Nilgiri Mountains. The northern slopes of the hills in Tamil Nadu now have coffee and tea plantations(especially around Valparai), as well as teak plantations of high economic value. The rest are mostly forests, of mainly two ecoregions-the South Western Ghats moist deciduous forests (mainly in Palakkad district and Idukki district of Kerala, as well as Tamil Nadu) and the South Western Ghats montane rain forests(mainly in Idukki district, Ernakulam district, Palakkad district of Kerala, Coimbatore district of Tamil Nadu).

The Western Ghats and Anaimalai Sub-Cluster, including the Anaimalai Hills, are now a UNESCO World Heritage Site.

== Geography ==
The hills are located between 10° 13' and 10° 31' N. and 76° 52' and 77° 23' E with a central point of: 10°22′N 77°07.5′E. They are south of where the Western Ghats are broken by the Palakkad Gap, which in, turn is south of the Nilgiri Hills. They border on Kerala to the southwest and the Cardamom Hills to the southeast. To the west is the bamboo-rich Idamalayar-Pooyamkutty valley. The Palni Hills lies to the east, extending into Kerala as the Pampadum Shola National Park. They are spread largely over Palakkad district, Thrissur district, Ernakulam district and Idukki district of Kerala(mainly Palakkad and Idukki), Tamil Nadu's Coimbatore district and Tiruppur district.

Their geological formation is metamorphic gneiss, veined with feldspar and quartz, and interspersed with reddish porphyrite. Twelve major forest types are found in the area. The landscape is fragmented by many coffee and tea plantations on the lower slopes and teak plantations higher up. Monsoon rains are heavy. Annual rainfall varies from 2,000 mm to 5,000 mm in the area. Formed by fault-block movements in the Holocene Epoch (i.e., about the past 11,700 years), the Anaimalai Hills descend to form a series of terraces about 3,300 feet (1,000 metres) high.

== Fauna ==
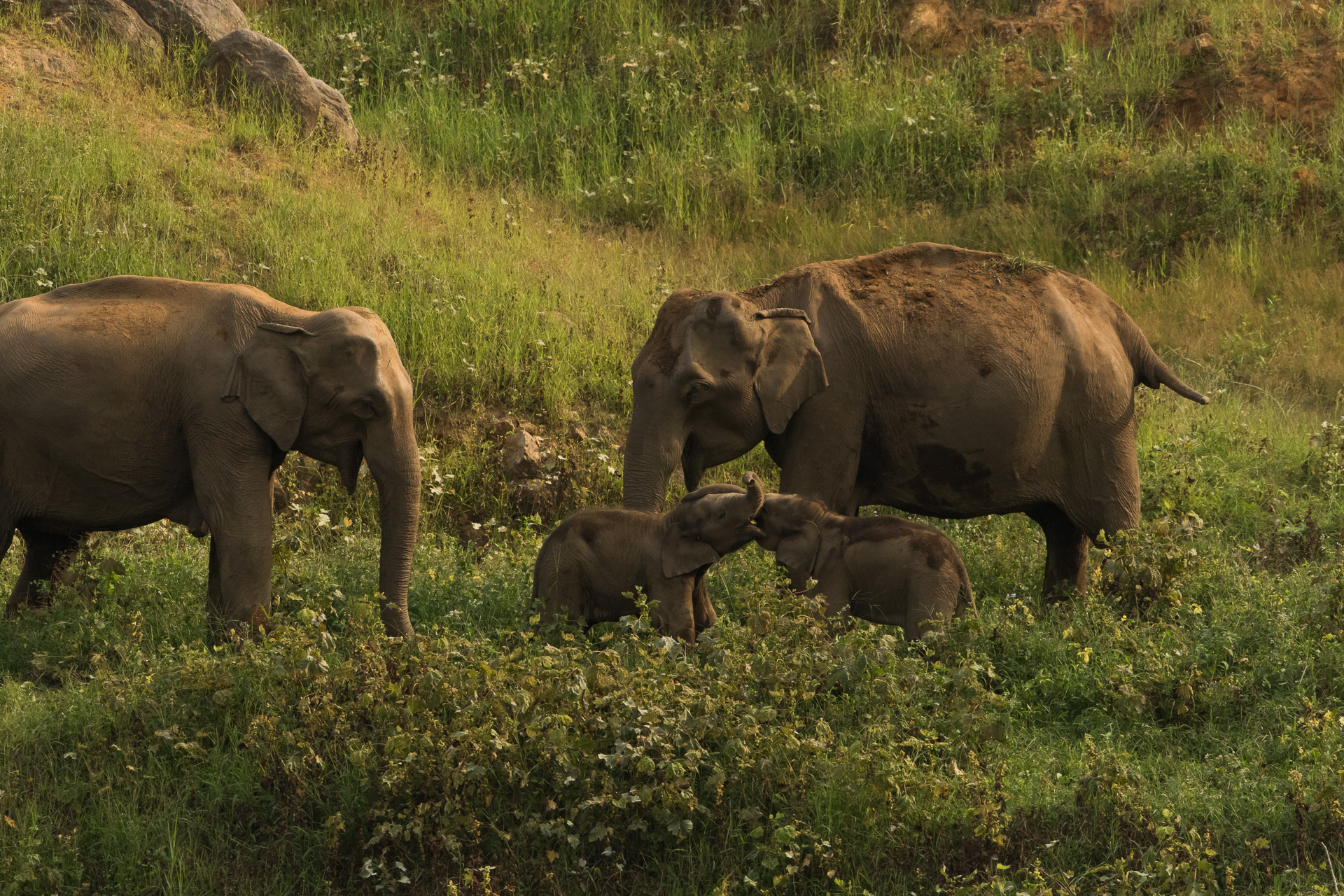
Wild elephants in Anamalai Tiger Reserve, Tamilnadu

The Anamala/Anaimalai Hills are known for their abundant wildlife. Eravikulam National Park, Chinnar Wildlife Sanctuary, Idamalayar Reserve Forest, Mankulam Forest division Parambikulam Wildlife Sanctuary, and Anamalai Tiger Reserve located among these hills are well known for elephants. The Idamalayar Dam area is a major wildlife spot, along with Pooyamkutty and Aanakkulam. This area includes various tribal villages and is protected. Numerous wildlife species can be seen including elephants, gaur, water buffaloes, tigers, panthers, sloth bears, pangolins, black-headed orioles, crocodiles, green pigeons, civet cats, dhole, sambar, black buck, and 31 groups of endangered lion-tailed macaques. Birds seen include the Pied hornbill, Red whiskered bulbul and Drongo.

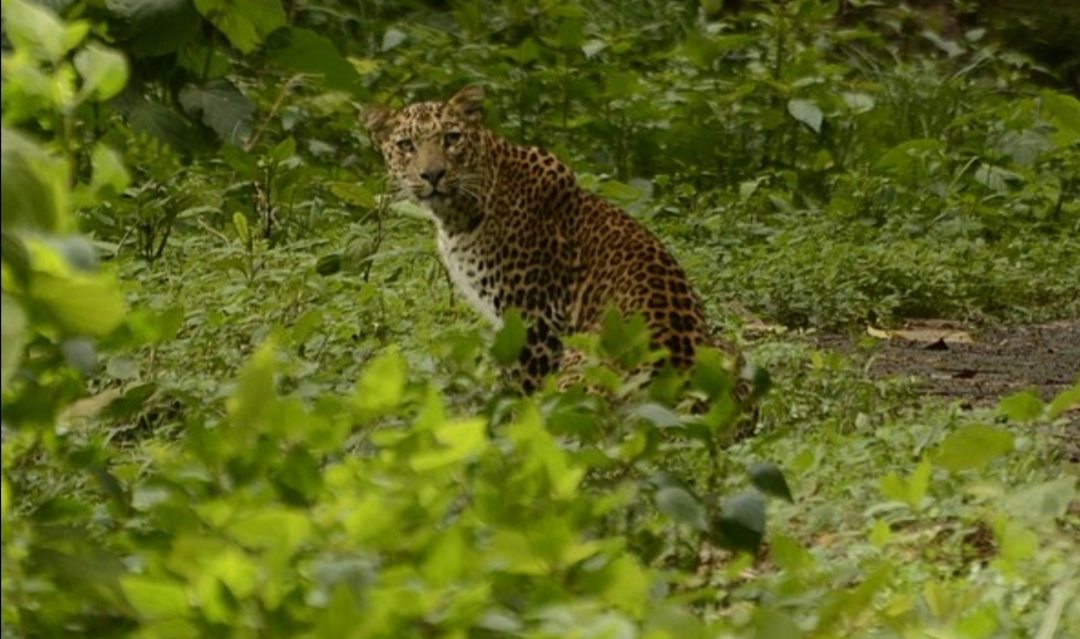
Leopard in Anamalai Tiger Reserve, Tamilnadu

Recently, a new frog species, Beddomixalus bijui, was found within the forest.

== Hydrology ==
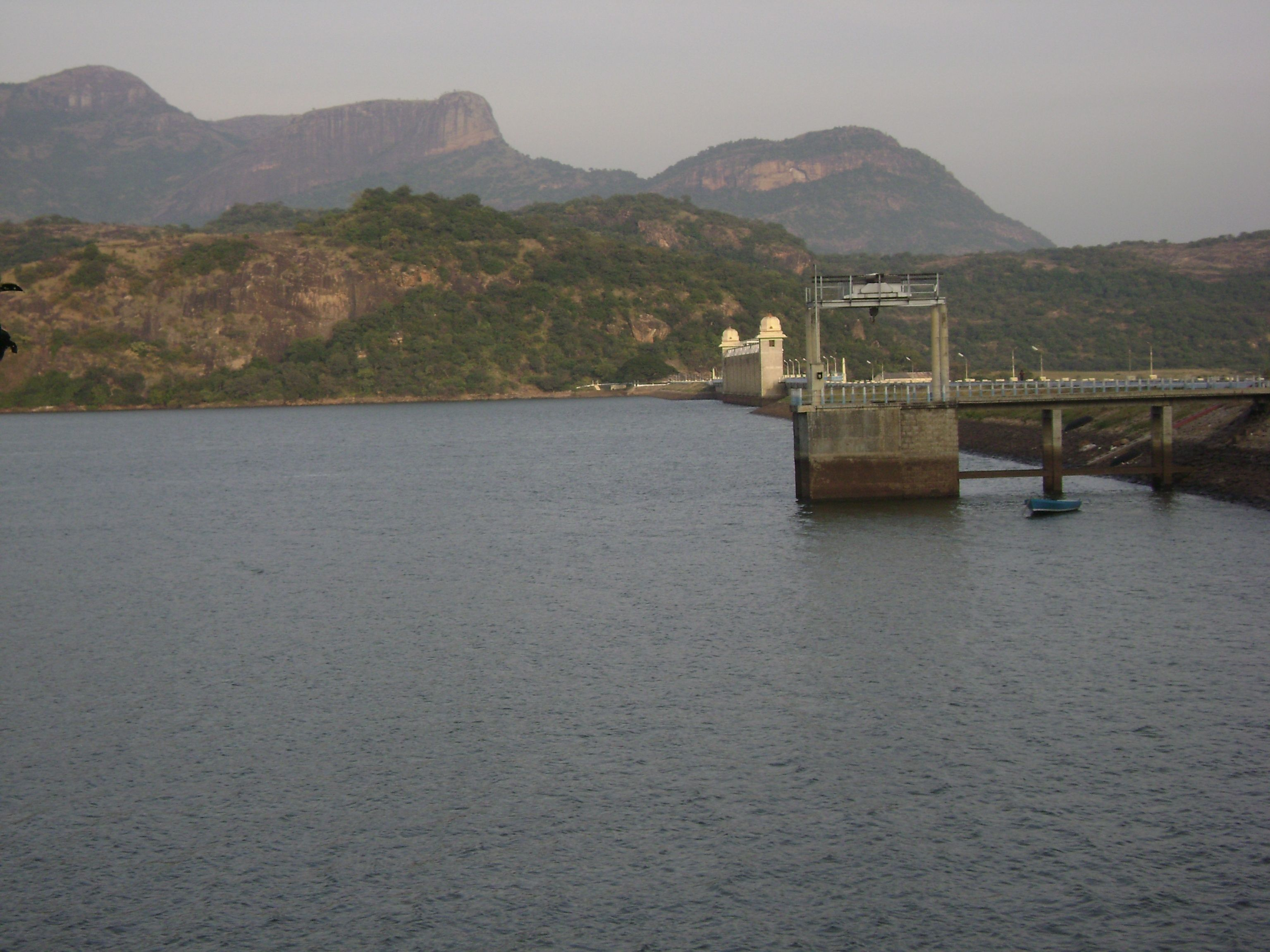
Amaravathi Reservoir and Dam

There are several rivers in the area including the Chalakkudipuzha, Aliayar, Apambar, Chinnar, Kaddambarrai, Neerar, Mannambhally, Pambar River, and the Idamalayar. Most of these rivers originate in the sholas, flowing mostly west towards the Arabian Sea, with a few exceptions, such as the Amaravathi and Pambar, which flow into Tamil Nadu, the Amaravathi being a tributary of the Kaveri. There are several large reservoirs in the area, including the Aliayar Dam, Amaravathi Dam, Kaddambarrai Dam, Neerar Dam, Sholayar Dam (one of the largest of its kind in Asia), Mannambhally Dam, the Idamalayar Dam and the Parambikkulam Dam. There is a water dispute between Kerala and Tamil Nadu about the Idamalayar Dam due to the construction of the Neerar Dam by Tamil Nadu on the Neerar, a tributary of the Idamalayar, and thereby, visitors are now prohibited from entering the Idamalayar Dam area. Vadattupara is the last destination that one is allowed to reach on the Bhoothathankettu-Idamalayar Dam Road. The area is also ecologically very sensitive.

== Tourism ==
The Anaimalai Hills are a popular trekking destination in the Western Ghats. Due to heavy rains during the wet season, the ideal time for tourism is between the months of November and May. SH-17 passes through the Anaimalai Hills, between Udumalapet and Munnar, SH-21 passes from Chalakudy to Malakkappara. The nearest towns are Munnar, Pooyamkutty, Mankulam, and Kothamangalam. The nearest international airports are Cochin International Airport and Coimbatore International Airport. Aluva railway station and Pollachi Junction railway station are the nearest railway stations.
