= Periyar River =

River in Kerala, India

Coordinates: 10°10′36″N 76°09′46″E

Periyar
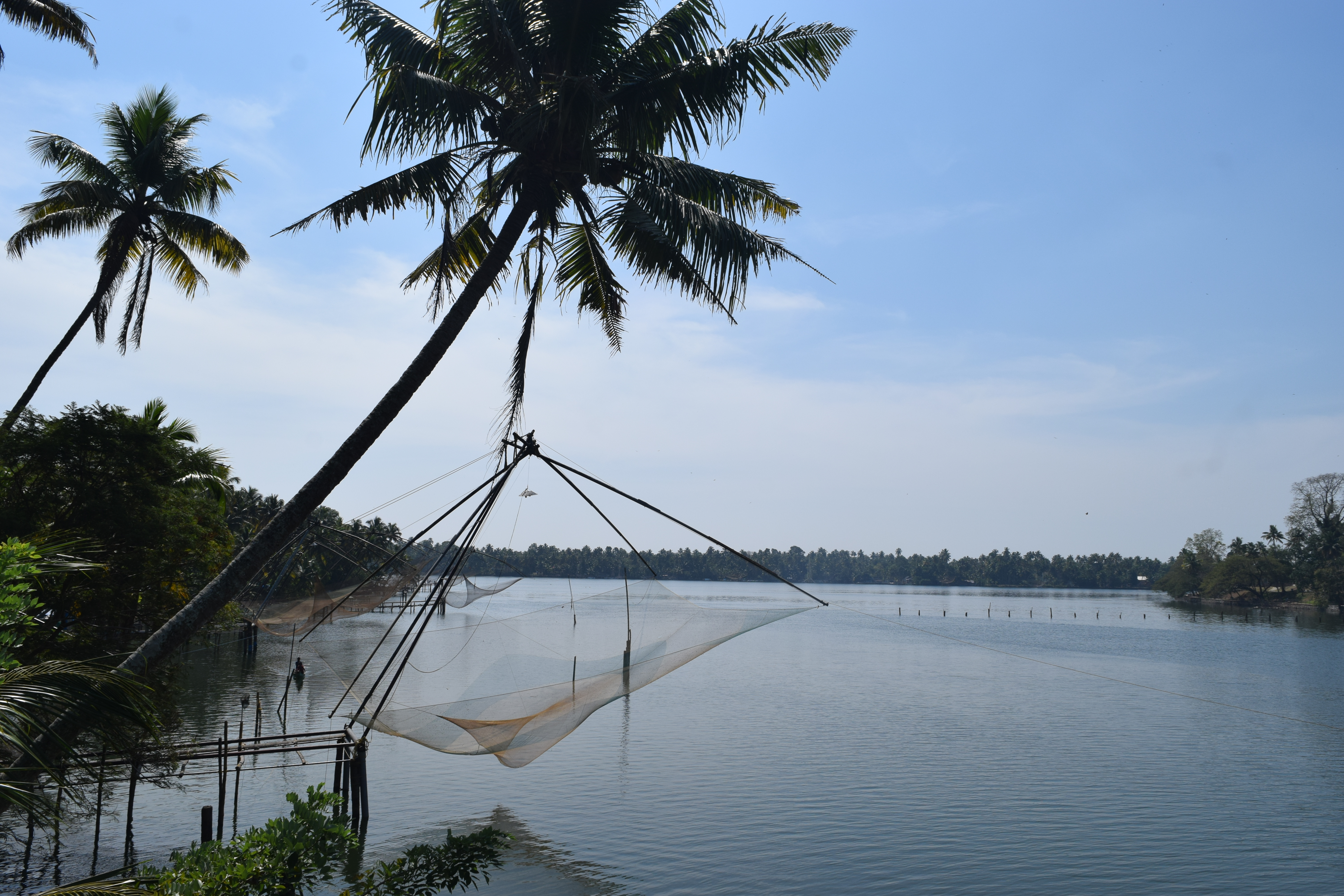
- Fishing nets over Periyar

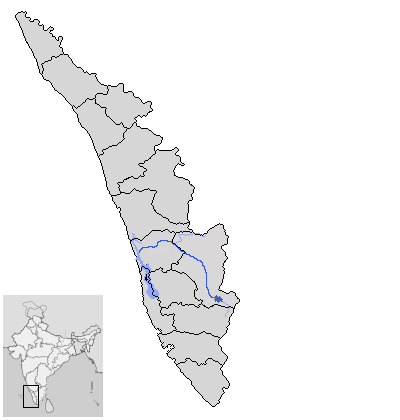
- Labelled map of Periyar River

Location
- Country: India
- State: Kerala
- Cities: Kochi, Neriamangalam, Kalady, Malayattoor

Physical characteristics
- Source: Chokkampatti Mala, Periyar Tiger Reserve
  - location: Kerala, India
- Mouth: Arabian Sea, Vembanad Lake
  - location: Kerala, India
- Length: 244 km (152 mi)
- Basin size: 5,398 km^{2} (2,084 sq mi)
- Discharge
  - location: mouth
  - average: 295 m^{3}/s (10,400 cu ft/s)
- Discharge
  - location: Kalady (1980–2004)
  - average: 223 m^{3}/s (7,900 cu ft/s)

Basin features
- Tributaries
  - left: Cheruthoni
  - right: Mullayar, Perinjankutti, Muthirapuzha, Edamala

Periyar river in Monsoon 2025 at Abhayaranyam Kaprikkadu Ecotourism

The Periyar (Malayalam: [peɾijaːr], meaning: big river) is the longest river and has the largest discharge potential in the Indian state of Kerala. It is one of the few perennial rivers in the region and provides drinking water for several major towns. The Periyar is vital to the economy of Kerala because it generates a significant proportion of Kerala's electrical power via the Idukki Dam and it flows along a region of industrial and commercial activity. The river also provides water for irrigation, domestic water use, and supports a rich fishery. Due to these reasons, the river has been named the "Lifeline of Kerala". Kochi city, in the vicinity of the river mouth, draws its water supply from Aluva, an upstream site sufficiently free of seawater intrusion. Twenty five percent of Kerala's industries are along the banks of the Periyar. These are mostly crowded within a stretch of 5 kilometres (3 mi) in the Eloor-Edayar region (Udhyogamandal), about 10 kilometres (6 mi) north of Kochi harbor.

== Origin and path ==
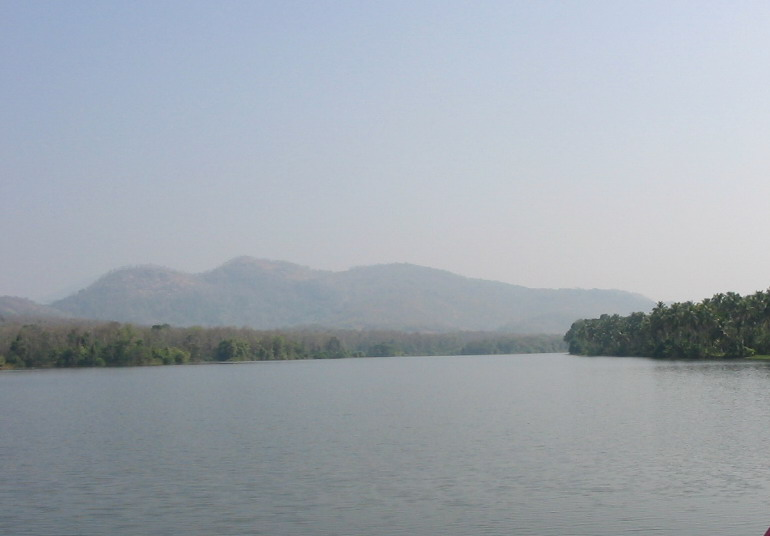
Periyar river at Bhoothathankettu near Kothamangalam, Ernakulam

The Periyar has a total length of approximately 244 kilometres (152 mi) and a catchment area of 5,398 square kilometres (2,084 mi^{2}), of which 5,284 square kilometres (2,040 mi^{2}) is in Kerala and 114 square kilometres (44 mi^{2}) is in Tamil Nadu.

=== Sources ===
The source of the Periyar lies high in the Western Ghats. The state of Kerala asserted during the hearings on the Mullaperiyar Dam issue in the Supreme Court of India that the Periyar originates in Kerala, flows entirely through Kerala and joins the sea in Kerala. This was also admitted by the state of Tamil Nadu in the court. Periyar originates at the southeastern border of Idukki district. The source of the river lies in the remote forests of the Periyar Tiger Reserve. The river originates from Chokkampatti Mala, a peak on the southern boundary of the Periyar Tiger Reserve. (Note: There is an alternate claim for a Tamil Nadu origin according to some non-governmental sources, indicating that the Periyar originates in the Sivagiri peaks of Sundaramala, Tamil Nadu. However, the Supreme Court of India in its judgement on the Mullaperiyar issue in 2014, made it clear that the state of Tamil Nadu cannot claim to be a riparian state of the river Periyar.)

=== Course ===
In its early course, the river flows in a narrow north sloping valley starting from the Chokkampatti hills and extending north about 25 kilometres (16 mi), with a number of sharp lateral ridges running down to it from east and west. After flowing 48 kilometres (30 mi) from its origin and on reaching Mount Plateau at its eastern end, it is joined by the west-flowing Mullayar—an important tributary—at Mullakudy. During this journey the Periyar traverses through the Periyar Tiger Reserve, flowing across or forming the boundaries between various sections of the reserve. Going downstream, it defines a part of the border between Periyar section of the reserve in the east and Sundaramala section in the west and then the borders between Moolavaigai and Thannikudy sections in the east and Ummikuppan, Mlappara and Aruvioda sections in the west before reaching the Periyar Lake.

The Mullaperiyar Dam is constructed at the confluence of the Periyar and Mullayar to create the Periyar Thekkady lake and reservoir, as well as the Periyar National Park. The area belonging to Tamil Nadu in the Periyar basin is located far down the river from the Mullaperiyar Dam site. This area is drained by the tributary Nirar, which is diverted to Tamil Nadu as a part of inter-state Parambikulam-Aliyar Project (PAP) agreement.

From Periyar Thekkady lake and reservoir, some water is diverted eastwards to Tamil Nadu via a tunnel. The diverted water, after power generation, is let into the Suruliar river (a tributary of the Vaigai River) thereby resulting in an inter-basin transfer of water. Downstream of the Mullaperiyar dam, the Periyar continues to flow northwestward for 35 kilometres (22 mi), exiting the Periyar Tiger Reserve and passing through Vandiperiyar, Elappara and Ayyappancoil to the Idukki reservoir formed by the Idukki, Cheruthoni and Kulamavu dams. The Idukki dam is constructed across the Periyar river on the famous Idukki gorge formed by the Kuravan and Kurathi hills.

The main Periyar below the Idukki reservoir flows due north parallel to the western edge of the Idukki plateau and is joined by the Perinjakutty from the east and Muthirapuzha from the north. After the confluence with Muthirapuzha, the river flows northwestwards and enters Ernakulam district at Neriamangalam. It is joined by its major tributary, the Idamalayar, 1.5 kilometres (0.9 mi) upstream of the Bhoothathankettu barrage. After receiving the waters of the Idamalayar river, the Periyar flows west along the midlands of Ernakulam district.

At Aluva, the river bifurcates into the Marthandavarma and the Mangalapuzha branches. The Mangalapuzha branch joins Chalakudy River and empties into the Lakshadweep Sea at Munambam, and the Marthandavarma branch flows southwards, again dividing into two near Kunjunnikkara island, going through the Udhyogamandal area and finally draining into the Cochin backwater system (part of Vembanad Lake) at Varappuzha. The Vembanad backwaters are connected to the Lakshadweep Sea at Cochin and Kodungallur.

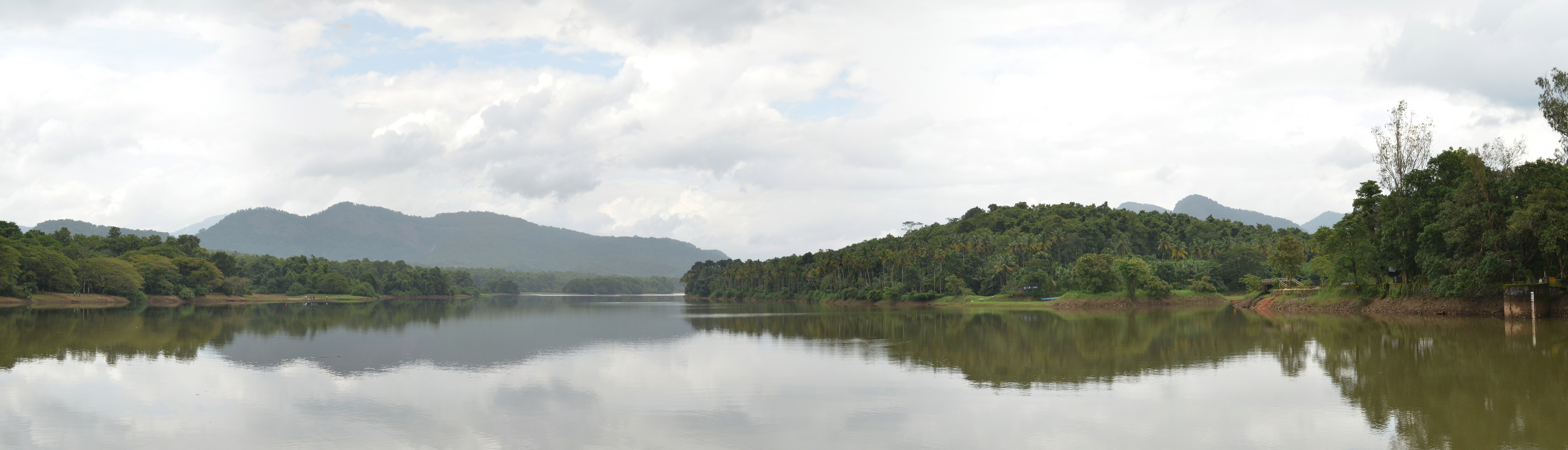
Panoramic view of Periyar River from Bhoothathankettu Dam

== Tributaries ==
Its major tributaries are:

- Muthirapuzha River
- Mullayar River
- Cheruthoni River
- Perinjankutti River
- Edamala River

Minor tributaries are: Muthayar, Perunthuraiar, Chinnar, Deviyar, Cheruthony, Kattappanayar

Although the Chalakudy river in strict geological sense is a tributary of the Periyar, for all practical purposes it is treated as a separate river by Government and other agencies. Chalakudy river itself has a catchment area of 1,704 square kilometres (658 mi^{2}), with 1,404 square kilometres (542 mi^{2}) in Kerala and 300 square kilometres (116 mi^{2}) in Tamil Nadu.

== Basin ==
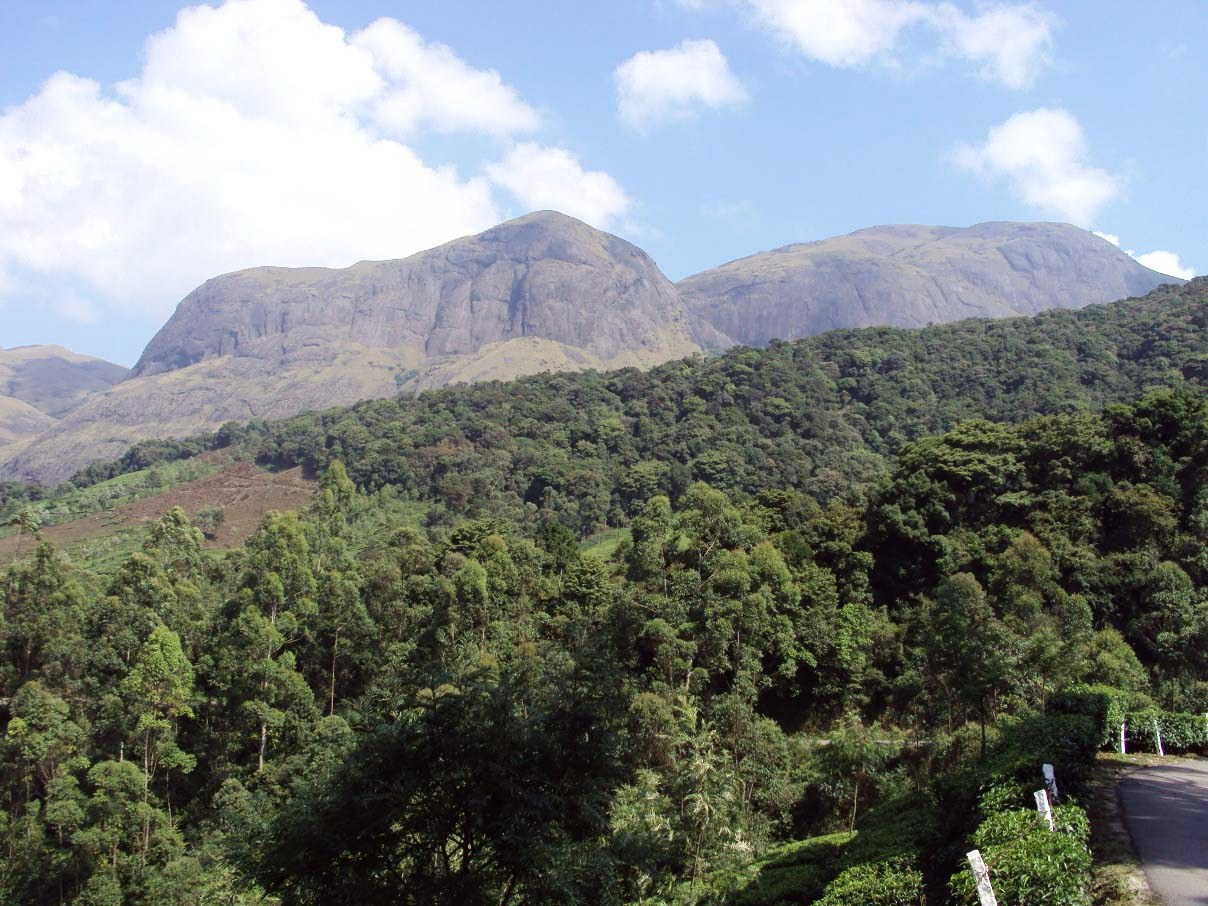
Anamudi peak, on the right, is the highest point of the Periyar basin at 2,695 m (8,842 ft).

The Periyar basin spreads over an area of 5,398 square kilometres (2,084 mi^{2}), most of it in central Kerala. It lies between latitudes 9°15’30"N and 10°21’00"N and longitudes 76°08’38"E and 77°24’32"E. The river drains parts of Idukki, Ernakulam and Thrissur districts in Kerala and Coimbatore district in Tamil Nadu. The basin has an inverted "L" shape with a maximum width at the intersection. The length-width ratio is 6:1. Most of the streams flow in deep gorges with steep valleys along the highlands of the basin. Coming out of the hills, the Periyar flows west and its basin occupies the northern part of Ernakulam district, covering the region from Neriamangalam through Aluva to Varapuzha and Munambam.

The Periyar is an 8th order stream with considerable development of tributary network. The average drainage density of the basin is 2.46 km/ km^{2} with a total number of first order streams of 15,773. The total stream length inclusive of all orders in the basin is 13,291 kilometres (8,259 mi). The river originates from the high hills of the Western Ghats and the influence of tectonism can be evidenced from the stream pattern and presence of structural valleys. Forests occupy nearly 1,500 square kilometres (580 mi^{2}) (28%) of the basin area whereas cardamom and settlement with mixed tree crops occupy an area of 322 square kilometres (124 mi^{2}) and 2,176 square kilometres (840 mi^{2}) respectively. The basin is ecologically sensitive. Nearly 80% of the total area situated in the high ranges are susceptible to erosion and mass movements.

Anamudi, at 2,695 metres (8,842 ft) the highest peak in South India, is the highest point in the basin.

=== Cardamom Hills ===
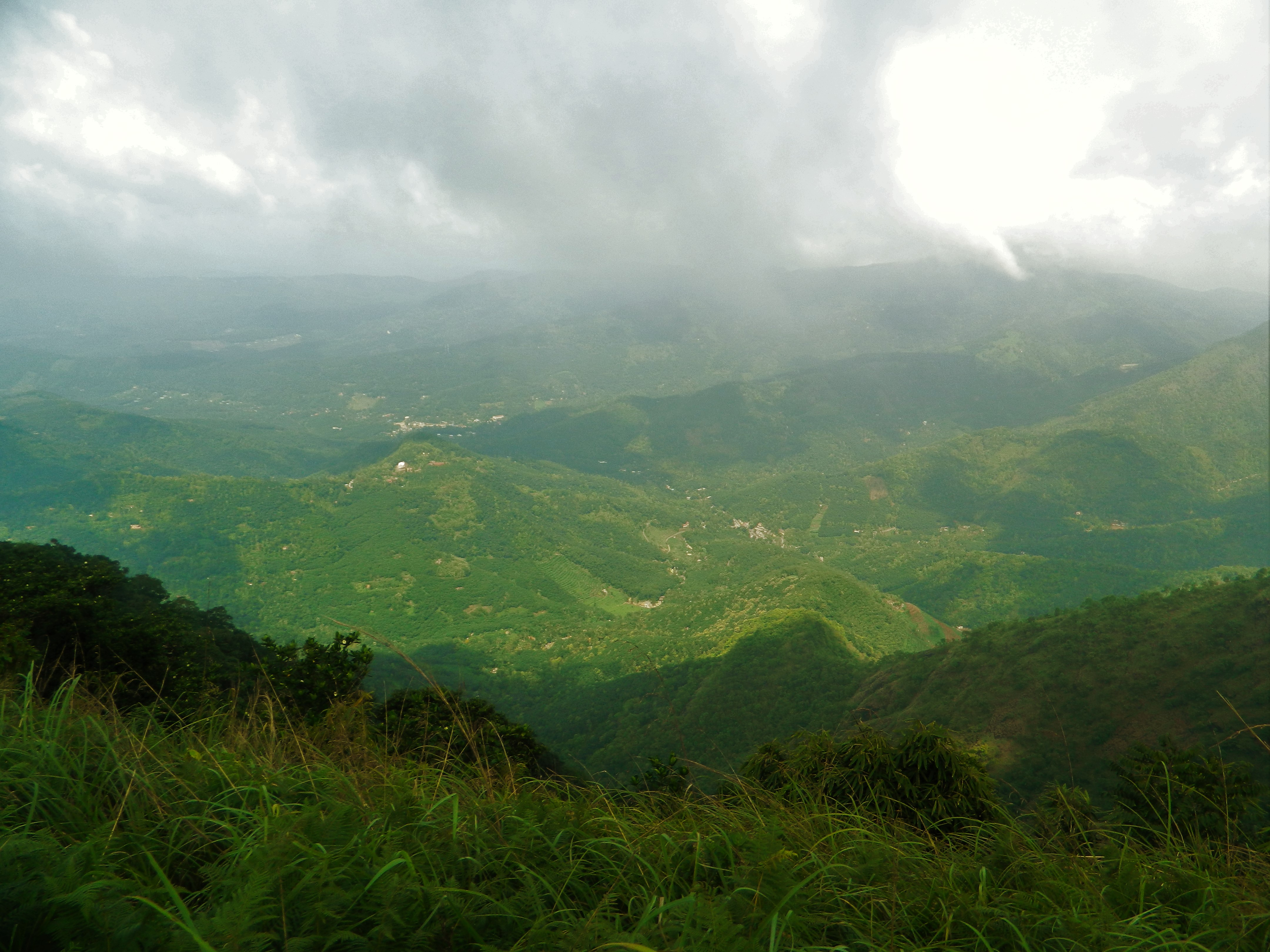
Cardamom Hills, Southern Western Ghats, Near Thekkady in Kerala

The upper part of the Periyar basin extends across the Cardamom Hills. In the north, these hills extend up to the high Munnar saddle running east to Chokkanad Mala and further on to Kolukkumala on the eastern edge of the Ghats. In the south, the hills reach up to the westerly spur at Chokkampatti Mala. This section of the basin is divided into three parts.

==== Source – Southern Cardamom Hills ====
The southernmost part of the Cardamom Hills i.e. the source of Periyar River is a narrow valley extending south of Kumily. This is the southern extreme of the Periyar basin. It is less than 20 kilometres (12 mi) wide and is about 40 kilometres (25 mi) long. The upper catchments of Periyar extend as a wedge deep into the northeastern corner of the neighboring Pandalam Hills. This section of the Cardamom Hills extends deep into but is clearly separated from the Pandalam Hills. The main Western Ghats watershed line forming the eastern border of the Cardamom Hills is highest to the southeast of the Kumily Gap. Here the High Wavies branch off towards north-west into Tamil Nadu, with some peaks reaching elevations of over 1,900 metres (6,200 ft) along the border between Kerala and Tamil Nadu. Further south, the ridge along the watershed line is heavily forested. This part of the Cardamom Hills is called the Sivagiri Range and it extends south up to Chokkampatti Mala which is at the junction of Pamba and Periyar River basins. The southern boundary of the Cardamom Hills runs along a westerly spur hill starting from the Chokkampatti Mala which initially runs north and then turns northwest almost parallel to the Sivagiri Range. This ridge separates the basin of Pamba from Periyar. From its source near Chokkampatti Mala initially Periyar flows north between these two heavily forested ridges. The valley floor is at an elevation of 1,000 metres (3,300 ft) and the ridges on either side often reach 1,800 metres (5,900 ft). This valley of Periyar at its source and the valley of Kunthi River in the Silent Valley are the only two forested higher valleys in the Western Ghats left intact even now. The 925-square-kilometre (357 mi^{2}) Periyar Tiger Reserve is mostly within this southernmost part of the Cardamom Hills.

==== Cardamom Hills plateau ====
A poorly defined ridge that runs from near Chakkupallam (north of Kumily) on the border between Kerala and Tamil Nadu extending southwest to near Vallakkadavu segregates the upper reaches of Periyar from the rest of the Cardamom Hills. Immediately downstream of Mullaperiyar dam, Periyar cuts through this ridge. North of this ridge, the Cardamom Hills extend up to the high Munnar saddle. Here, east of the river channel, the undulating plateau rises up to the watershed line of the Western Ghats. This section drains into the Periyar through the Perinjankutty Ar and the drainage channel is essentially from south-east to north-west. This portion of the Cardamom Hills is on an average 800 metres (2,600 ft) high. The northern edge of the Cardamom Hills bordering the High Range Plateau on the other hand slopes steeply to the south and is drained by Panniyar. The Panniyar joins the Muthirapuzha, which drains the High Range Plateau section of the Periyar Basin in the north. The crestline of the Cardamom Hills in this section along the border with Theni and Kambam, in comparison with the rest of the main watershed line of the Cardamom Hills and the High Ranges, is low, reaching up to only about 1,000 metres (3,300 ft). East of Chakkupallom, a small part of the adjacent Vaigai basin protrudes from Tamil Nadu into Kerala in this section. This portion of the Periyar basin is drier than all other west sloping parts of the Western Ghats. It has no significant extent of natural forests remaining anywhere. At the turn of the 20th century, it was fully covered by evergreen forests.

==== Idukki Sub-plateau ====
The portion west of the main Periyar channel which flows from south to north here, is the true Idukki sub-plateau. This is the lowest part of the Cardamom Hills sloping towards the north in which the Idukki reservoir is located. It is separated from the rest of the Cardamom Hills by the deep channel of the Periyar River. The sub-plateau extends north from near Ayyappankoil to near Neriamangalam. Its western border is the clearly demarcated scarp face of the Ghats descending to the plains of Thodupuzha. This 900-to-1,000-metre (3,000 to 3,300 ft) high western crestline separates the Periyar catchment from the Manimala, Meenachil and Moovattupuzha drainage basins. It ends in the north along the channel of Periyar from Neriamangalam to Panamkutty. The catchment of Kattappana Ar located beyond the southeastern corner of the Idukki reservoir also falls in this portion. A southwest to northeast ridge called the Chekuthan Mala separates the Idukki Sub-plateau from the Peermade Plateau as well as the main mass of Cardamom Hills. Its eastern boundary is a northwest to southeast ridge separating the Idukki reservoir from the Kallar/Perinjankutty tributary of Periyar which drains the main Cardamom Hills. The Idukki Subplateau is at an average elevation of 700 metres (2,300 ft). This area was heavily forested till the 1950s but now only three small fragments of forest vegetation alone remain. The largest is within the Idukki Wildlife Sanctuary. South of Vagamon, the tributaries of Meenachil, Manimala and Pamba have eroded away extensive areas of the Periyar basin between Ayyappankovil and Vallakkadavu. The Periyar only has a narrow strip of the Cardamom Hill tableland to flow northward here.

=== High Range Plateau ===
The High Range Plateau is located around Munnar and Devikulam. It has an average elevation of about 1,800 metres (5,900 ft) and drains to the south through Muthirapuzha into Periyar. The high Rajamala-Anamudi-Umayamala part of the main Anamalai ridge forms its northern boundary. A spur ridge starting from the main Anamalai ridge, going south immediately to the west of Munnar and continuing on to Parvathi Mala forms the western boundary of the High Range Plateau. This ridge separates the High Ranges from the Lower Periyar Valleys further to the west. The eastern edge of the High Range plateau runs north from Kolukkumala, at the junction of the High Range Plateau with the Cardamom Hills, and continues onto the Top Station along the border between Kerala and Tamil Nadu. The High Range portion is essentially the south and west draining slopes of the main Anamalai ridge with the Cardamom Hills located to its south. All the northern slopes of the main Anamalai ridge falling within Kerala drain into Idamalayar and Pooyamkutty Ar, both tributaries of Periyar.

The High Range Plateau has been almost totally transformed by tea plantations and hydroelectric dams. The original forest was mostly of the Shola-Grassland type. From the biodiversity value, this unit is of special importance because of its specialized high altitude flora and fauna.

=== Lower Periyar Valleys ===
The Lower Periyar Valleys includes Idamalayar and Pooyamkutty Ar and were formed from heavy rainfall on a likely geologically unstable part of the Western Ghats. The heavy rains have led to rapid weathering and erosion, creating a topographically complex segment along the western edge of the High Range Plateau. This region extends from Neriamangalam in the southwest to Panamkutty in the southeast, following the Periyar River. It reaches north to divide the Periyar and the Chalakudy Basins and its eastern border is the Anamalai ridge.

The western slope of the Western Ghats is deeply carved and has distinct geographical and ecological characteristics that are unique the Western Ghats. The southern part of the Lower Periyar Valleys includes the Idukki sub-plateau and the Cardamom Hills to the southeast. The eastern boundary is formed by the western edge of Panniyar and Muthirapuzha Basins and the Parvathimudi-Umayamala ridge forms the northeastern edge of the Lower Periyar Valleys.

Towards north, the Lower Periyar Valleys and the Periyar Basin extend up to the Idamala gorge cut by Periyar’s northernmost tributary – Idamalayar. The basin is bounded in the north by the ridge separating Sholayar from the Idamala River. This ridge is a spur hill extending from near Valaparai in Tamil Nadu, projecting far west into Kerala. The Idamala gorge separates the Sholayar forests in the Nelliyampathies towards the north from the southern Anamudi Reserved Forest and High Range Plateau. The area belonging to Tamil Nadu in the Periyar basin is situated here. This area forms the north-eastern corner of the Periyar basin. It is drained by the tributary Nirar, which runs in a South Westerly Direction and falls into Idamalayar. Within this section there are a series of deep west-sloping valleys where the valley floors are often at elevations less than 300 metres (980 ft). Separating these valleys are a jumble of steep hills and flat topped plateaux with scarp faces rearing up to elevations of around 900 to 1,500 metres (3,000 to 4,900 ft). The Idamala and Pooyamkutty rivers drain most of this section while its southern edge drains into the main Periyar. This tract is almost entirely forested and the forests extend northwest between Periyar and Chalakudy rivers along the plains almost up to Kalady.

=== Periyar Midlands and Lowlands ===
To the west of the Lower Periyar Valleys are the midlands, which are characterized by undulating topography with small hills separated by valleys. The general gradient is towards the west here. The lowlands occur as a narrow belt almost parallel to the present shoreline. The landforms of this section are broad valleys, submerged lands with swamps and marshes and subdued sand dunes. Many parts of the area are directly connected to the backwaters with a network of canals. The river bifurcates near Aluva into two major distributaries; one continues to flow through Desam as Mangalappuzha and finally drains into the Lakshadweep Sea. The Chalakudy river also joins to this branch of the Periyar 10 kilometres (6 mi) south-east of Kodungalloor which expands to its maximum width at Munambam. The Marthandavarma branch flows southwards, again dividing into two near Kunjunnikkara Island, and finally drains into the Vembanad backwaters at Varapuzha. The most industrialized zone of Periyar lies in this part of the basin between Angamaly and Cochin, with over 50 large and medium scale industries. The Edayar branch of Periyar caters to the needs of these industries.

== Dams ==
=== Hydro-electric projects ===
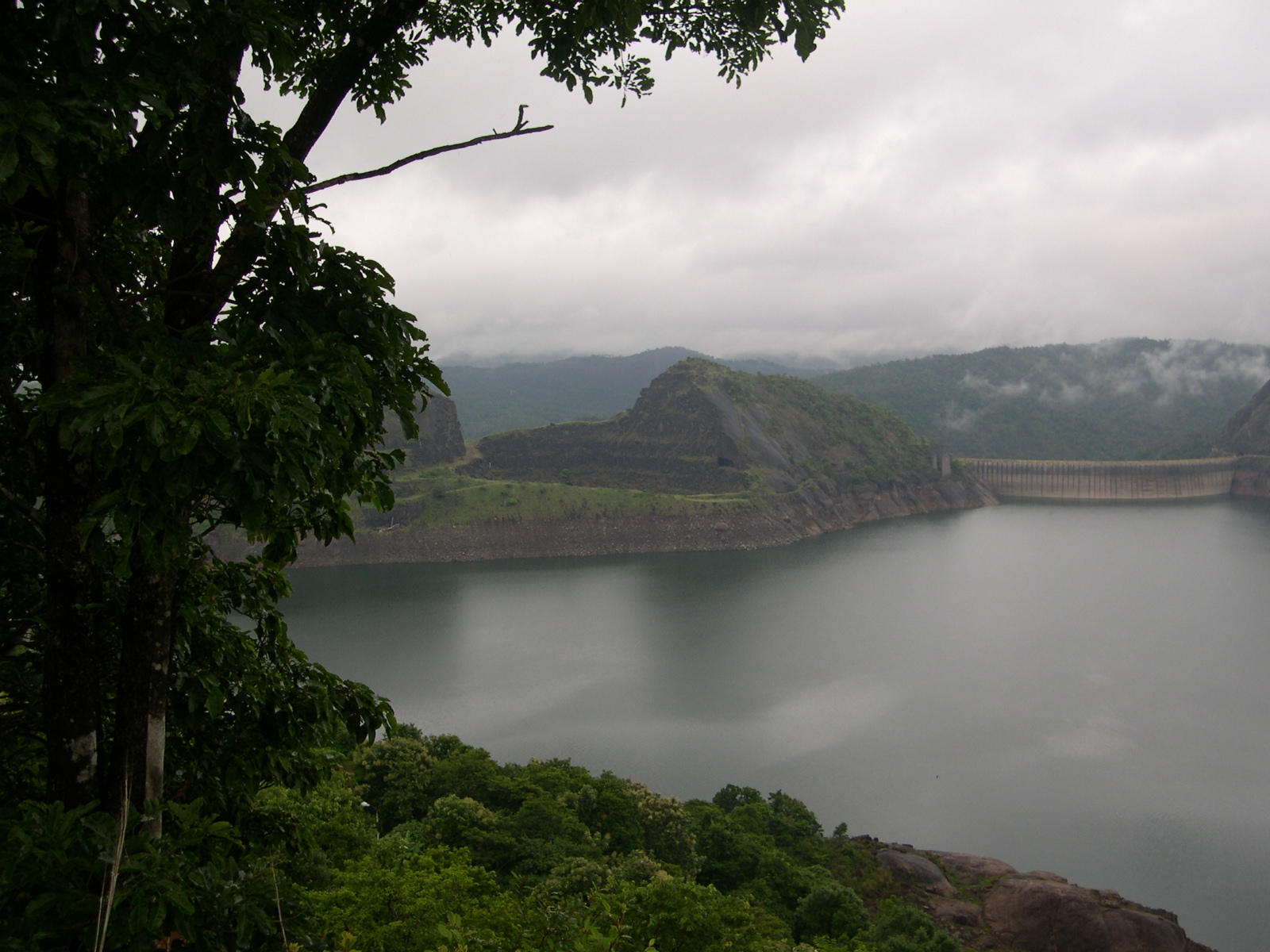
Idukki Dam across the Periyar river

The Idukki Dam is the largest hydro-electric project in Kerala and lies on the Periyar. It is the biggest dam of its kind (a concrete, double curvature parabolic, thin arc dam) in Asia and the second-biggest in the world. Its generators have a power output of 780 MW (6 × 130), and generate electricity through the underground facility at Moolamattam, built by an India-Canada joint venture. Power generation at Idukki is minimal during the monsoon. The dam also permits storage of water for the dry summer period when many other reservoirs in the area are low. Since the commissioning of the Idukki project in 1976, tail-race water (between 19.83–78.5 m^{3}/s) has been diverted from the Idukki reservoir through the Moolamattom power station into the Thodupuzha tributary of the Muvattupuzha river.

There are other hydro-electric generation facilities on the river at Pallivasal, Chenkulam, Panniyar, Neriyamangalam and Lower Periyar.

=== Reservoirs ===
The important reservoirs in the Periyar basin within Kerala are Bhoothathankettu, Idamalayar, Lower Periyar, Mattupetty, Anayirangal, Kundala, Ponmudi, Kallarkutti, Idukki (formed by construction of three dams—Idukki, Cheruthoni and Kulamavu), Sengulam, Kallar, Erattayar and Mullaperiyar. The dams falling within Tamil Nadu in the Periyar basin are the Upper Nirar Weir and the Lower Nirar Dam. These dams help divert water from the Nirar tributary of Periyar to the adjacent Sholayar basin.

=== Irrigation ===
The Periyar valley Irrigation project in Ernakulam district envisages the utilization of the tail race discharge from the completed Hydel scheme in the Muthirapuzha tributary of river Periyar together with the controlled release from Ennackal dam constructed by Kerala State Electricity Board under Hydel scheme across the Idamalayar tributary and the dependable run off from the uncontrolled catchment of Periyar river, for irrigating an area of 32,800 hectares (81,000 acres) of land lying on the left bank of Periyar river through a network of canal system and controlling devices. The scheme consists of the Periyar Barrage at Bhoothathankettu with a catchment area of 3,048 square kilometres (1,177 mi^{2}) along with a network of canals.

Apart from irrigation on left bank of Periyar, the project also enables a supply of minimum quantity of water through the river to check the intrusion of salinity at lower reaches of the river as well as to meet the requirements of many lift irrigation schemes of river Periyar. Supply of water for drinking and industrial purposes are met by a portion of storage water by the barrage of Bhoothathankettu.

=== Inter-basin transfer of water ===
Mullaperiyar dam was one of the earliest instances of inter-basin transfers in the peninsular India. While it met the demand for water on one hand, it led to the deterioration of water quality downstream of the river. Salinity intrusion and pollution dispersion problems arose in the lower reaches of the Periyar due to non-availability of sufficient quantity of water for flushing. Another inter-basin transfer from the Periyar to the Muvattupuzha river due to the Idukki project has further adversely affected the downstream flow in the Periyar river.

The Parambikulam Aliyar Project (PAP) agreement was conceived to harness and share the waters in the inter-State rivers in Bharathappuzha, Chalakkudypuzha and Periyar basins. Nirar and Anamalayar, tributaries of Periyar are covered under this agreement. Water from these rivers are transferred to the adjacent Sholayar basin as part of the PAP agreement.

Due to all the diversions in its basin, the Periyar has lost 22 per cent of its average flow.

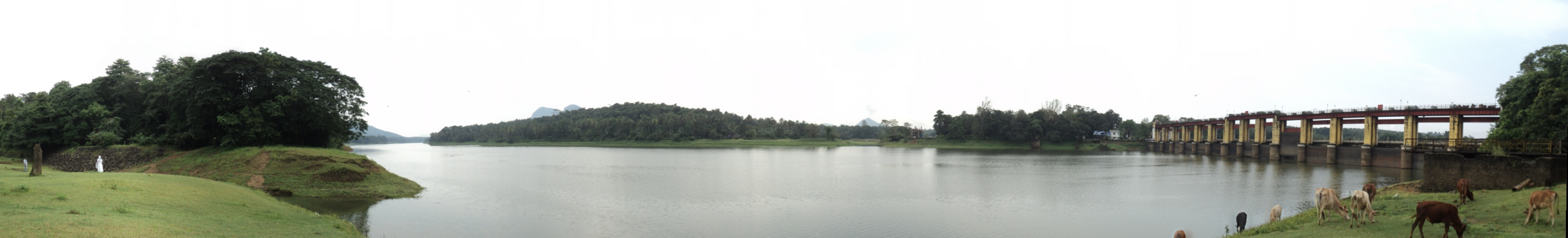
Periyar Barrage, Bhoothathankettu

== Ecological significance ==
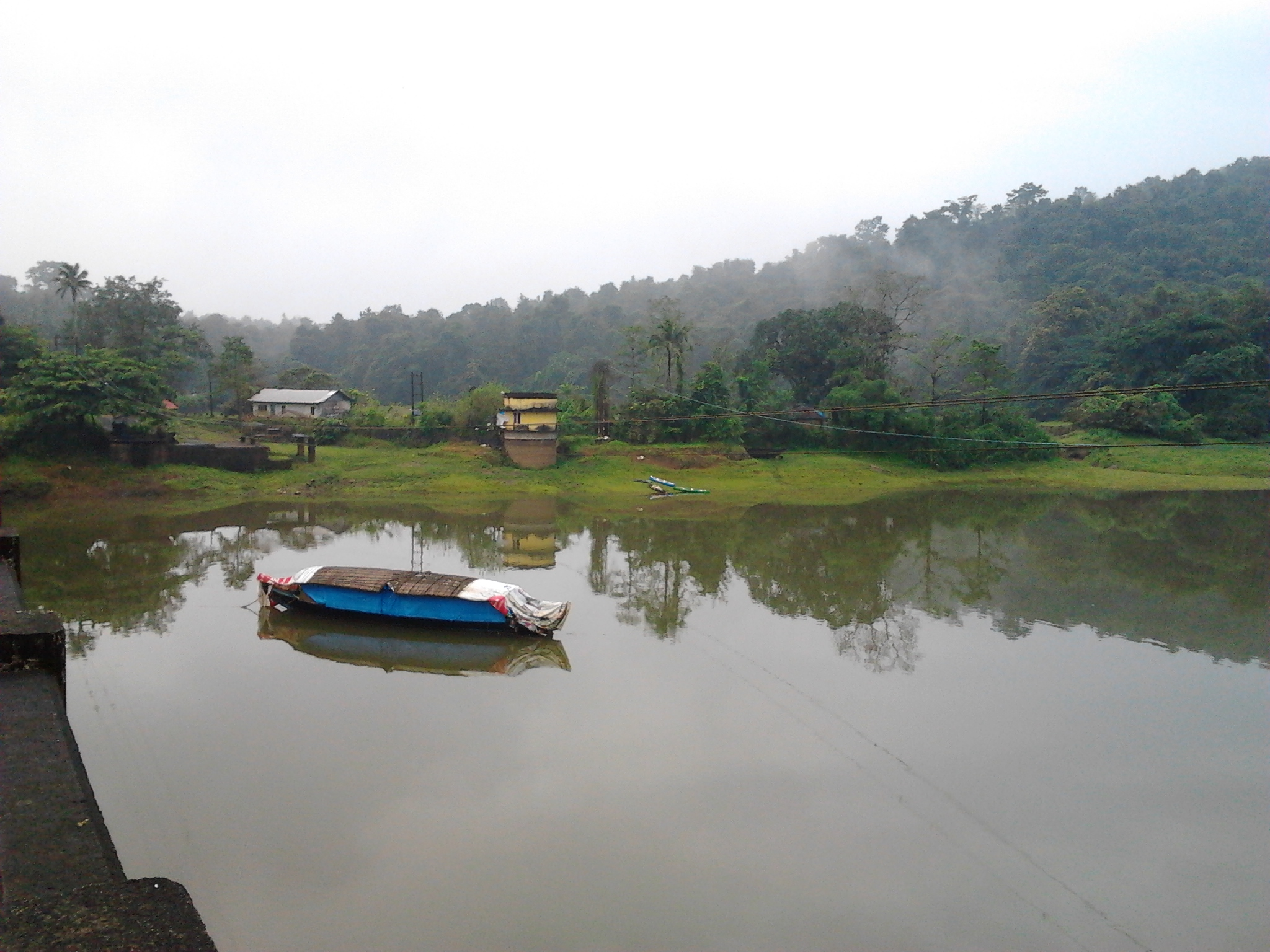
Thattekad Bird Sanctuary is an evergreen low-land forest located between the branches of Periyar River

South of the Mullaperiyar reservoir, at the source of Periyar River, there is an unbroken stretch of about 350 square kilometres (140 mi^{2}) of sheltered, unmodified rainforests within the Periyar Tiger Reserve. These rainforests extend further west into the adjacent Pamba basin within the Gudarakal Forest Range and continue south beyond the Gudarakal Range into the forests of the Achankovil Division. This entire stretch contains about 600 to 700 square kilometres (230 to 270 mi^{2}) of undisturbed wet evergreen forests typical of the Western Ghats. The forests on the upper reaches of Periyar are mostly inaccessible and is one of the least disturbed evergreen forests left in the Western Ghats.

The Periyar Tiger Reserve (PTR) is also one of the most ecologically diverse regions in India. The flora of the reserve is very rich and diverse. Out of the estimated 3,800 species of angiosperms of Kerala, 1,966 have been reported from within the reserve. Nowhere in the subcontinent, has such a large number of taxa been reported from an area comparable to that of the PTR. Apart from this, the reserve also contains an estimated 323 species of birds, 38 species of fish and 44 species of reptiles.

The Periyar plateau forms a part of the Project Elephant Reserve 10, which also includes the Agasthyamalai-Mahendragiri hills. The landscape on the Periyar Plateau portion of Elephant Reserve 10 maintains the most intact elephant range in Southern India. This area is believed to harbour about 2,000 elephants and is one of the potential landscapes for the long-term conservation of the species. This population is genetically more diverse and distinct from the much larger elephant population further north in the Ghats. This region is also known for its rich biodiversity. On the other hand, the landscape has also witnessed a variety of developmental activities including commercial plantations, hydroelectric and irrigation projects and other forms of infrastructural development that impede the movement of elephants.

Thattekad Bird Sanctuary, one of the important bird sanctuaries of India, is an evergreen low-land forest located between the branches of Periyar River. It has a rich and varied birdlife. Several species of birds, both forest birds as well as the water birds visit the sanctuary. Dr. Salim Ali, India's greatest ornithologist, once described this tiny, 25-square-kilometre (10 mi^{2}) bird sanctuary, located about 60 kilometres (37 mi) north-east of Kochi, as "The richest bird habitat in peninsular India".

Periyar is one of the six major rivers flowing into the Vembanad lake. Vembanad Kol Wetland was included in the list of wetlands of international importance, as defined by the Ramsar Convention for the conservation and sustainable use of wetlands. It is home to more than 20,000 waterfowls—the third largest such population in India.

== Religious and cultural significance ==
There are several places of religious significance along the banks of the Periyar. The famous Aluva Sivarathri festival is celebrated on the banks of the Periyar River in Aluva. The temple festival is conducted every year on Sivarathri day of the Kumbham month of Malayalam calendar. The Siva temple on the sand bank of Periyar River throngs with devotees every year on Mahasivarathri day.

Kalady is a town located on the banks of the Periyar river. It is the birthplace of Sri Adi Shankara, the Hindu philosopher who consolidated the doctrine of Advaita Vedanta. Kalady started featuring in the spiritual map of India only after its rediscovery in the late 19th century by the then Shankaracharya of Sringeri and the subsequent consecration of a temple for Sri Adi Shankara in 1910.

Located 52 kilometres (32 mi) from Kochi, the Malayatoor Church is situated atop the 609-metre (1,998 ft) high Malayatoor Hill. The church is dedicated to St. Thomas, who is believed to have prayed at this shrine. One of the most important Christian pilgrim centres in Kerala, it attracts devotees in very large numbers not only from Kerala but also from the neighbouring states. This famous church is situated at Kurisumudi, a verdant hill in the Western Ghats girdled partially by the Periyar (river). The Church has a life-size statue of St. Thomas and the imprint of the feet of the Apostle on a rock. This shrine has now been accorded an international pilgrimage station.

== Environmental issues ==
=== Pollution ===
The lower reaches of the Periyar are heavily polluted. Industries in the Eloor industrial zone discharge waste into the river. Greenpeace India describes the lower Periyar as "a cesspool of toxins, which have alarming levels of deadly poisons like DDT, endosulfan, hexa and trivalent chromium, lead, cyanide, BHC". Several studies have pointed out that the riverbed has deposits of heavy metals like lead, cadmium, mercury, chromium, nickel, cobalt and zinc and the ecosystem of the river has many dead zones. Some of the major recommendations are ensuring zero effluent discharge from the industrial units in the Eloor-Edayar stretch and zero emission from companies. Pollution of the river and surrounding wetlands has almost wiped out traditional occupations, including fishing and farming.

=== Illegal sand mining ===
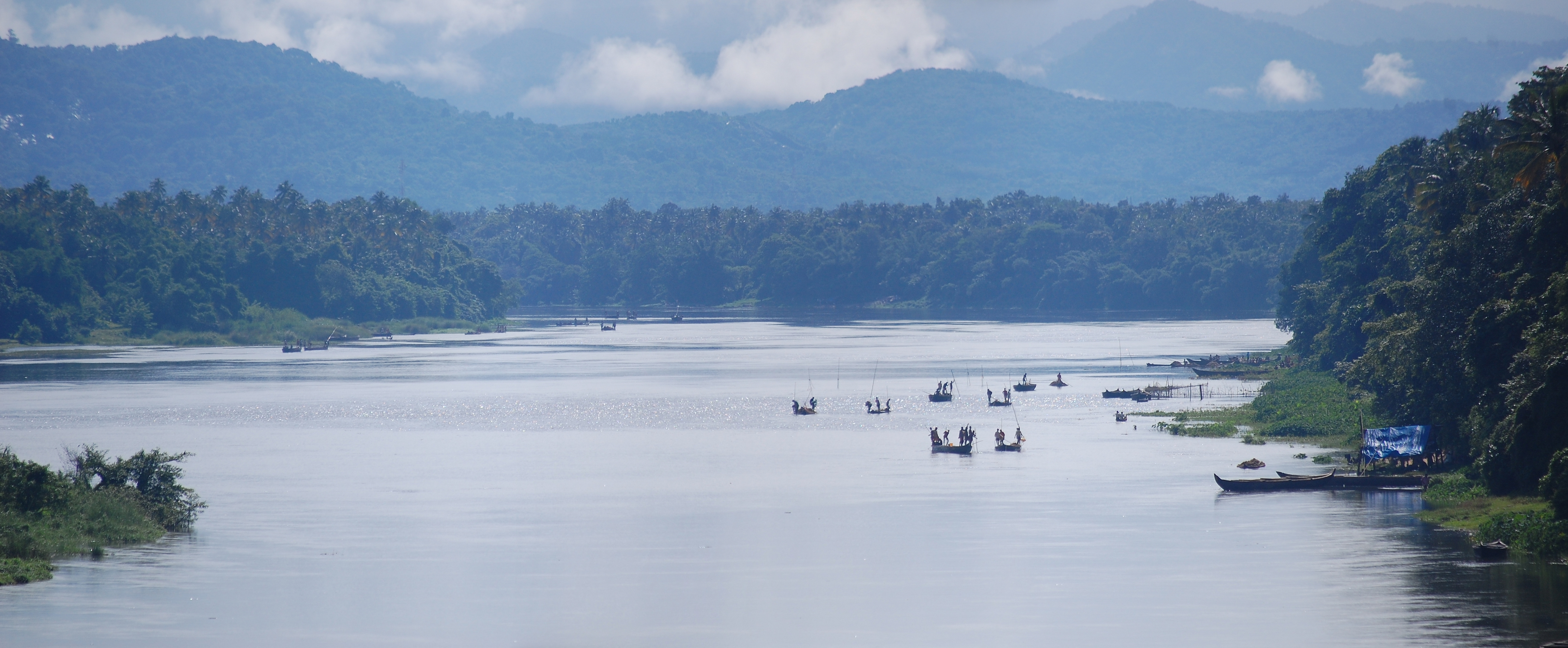
Sand mining

Illegal sand mining from the Periyar is another major environmental issue. Studies have pointed out that the quantity of sand being mined from the Periyar is at least 30 times the actual quantity that can be taken out without causing damage to the river’s environmental system. In the Periyar river basin, land sand mining is widespread in the plateau region in the highlands. Mining of sands from these areas impose severe environmental problems to the river basin environment.

=== Environmental protection efforts ===
Efforts have been made to prevent soil erosion on the banks of river periyar at Aluva Sivarathri manappuram (sand bank) through afforestation programs headed by renowned environmentalist, Prof. S. Sitaraman, since 1992. The Aluva Environmental Protection Forum started by Sitaraman and others have played a pivotal role in the prevention of illegal sand mining and water pollution in the lower reaches of the river.

== Dispute ==
The control and safety of the Mullaperiyar dam on the river and the validity and fairness of the corresponding lease agreement have been points of dispute between Kerala and Tamil Nadu states. Intertwined with this, there is a dispute as to whether the Periyar should be classified as an inter-state river or not. Kerala states that the Periyar is an intrastate river since no part of it flows through Tamil Nadu. The river originates in Kerala, flows entirely through Kerala and joins the Arabian Sea in the Kerala. Although these facts have been admitted by Tamil Nadu, it counters that the Periyar should be considered an inter-state river since a part of the catchment of the river lies in Tamil Nadu. It has also cited a 1950 report signed by the then Kerala state irrigation minister V R Krishna Iyer recording that Periyar is an inter-state river since some of its drainage area lay in Madras state. Essentially, the dispute over the status of the river comes down to the definition of an inter-state river, with Kerala supporting the definition to be according to the course of the river, while Tamil Nadu favouring the definition to be according to the catchment area of the river.

The Supreme Court of India, in its verdict on 7 May 2014, stated that although the Periyar rises in and traverses only in the territory of Kerala before entering into Arabian sea, no part of the land in Tamil Nadu abuts river Periyar and that Tamil Nadu is not a riparian state of the Periyar river, the fact that a small part of the Periyar river basin lies in Tamil Nadu is enough to make the river interstate in nature.

== See also ==
- 2018 Kerala floods
- List of most-polluted rivers
