= Cheruthoni =

- village
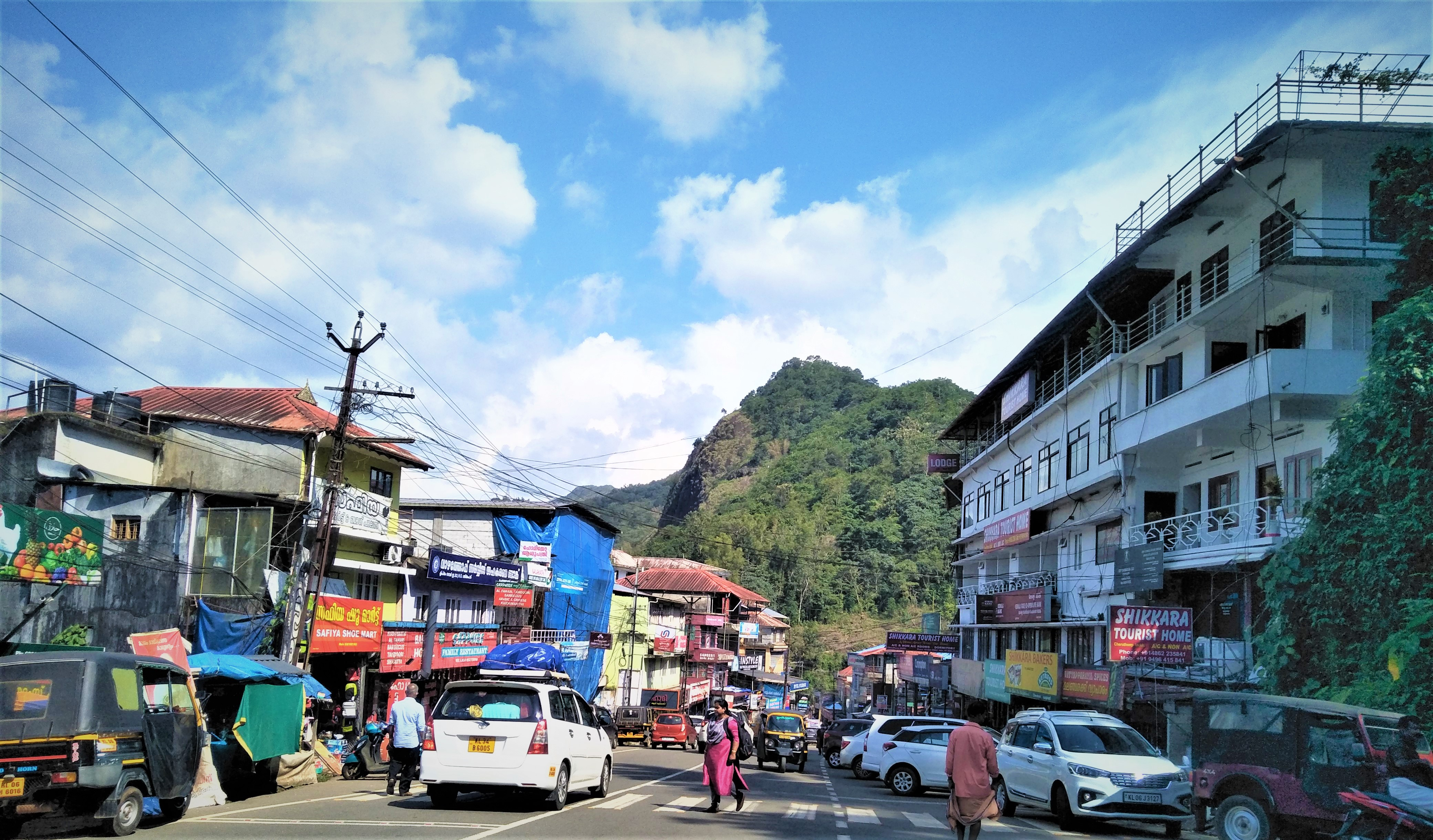

- Location in Kerala, India Cheruthoni (India)
- Coordinates: 9°46′25″N 77°2′07″E
- Country: India
- State: Kerala
- District: Idukki

Government
  - Type: Panchayath

Languages
  - Official: Malayalam, English
- Time zone: UTC+5:30 (IST)
- PIN: 685602
- Vehicle registration: KL-06
- Nearest city: Kattappana, Thopramkudy

Cheruthoni is a town on the banks of Cheruthoni River, a major tributary of the Periyar River, the second longest river in Kerala state, in southwestern India. The area is known by Cheruthoni Dam, which is a part of Idukki reservoir, which provide hydroelectric power to the region.

== Location ==
The town is adjacent to the famous Idukki Arch Dam and the Cheruthoni dam. These dams, along with the Kulamavu Dam, form the Idukki Reservoir. Cheruthoni is part of Vazhathope Panchayat, in the Idukki District. Villages adjacent to Cheruthoni are Vazhathope, Thadiyampadu, Karimban, Manjappara, Maniyarankudi, Bhoomiyamkulam, Peppara, Manjikkavala and Painavu.

== Origin ==
The origins of this place can be traced back to 1940s, following a famine the government allowed farmers to migrate to unoccupied arable lands in the mountains, where they cleared the land for agriculture. Later, this region was identified as an ideal spot for a hydroelectric project. The Hindustan Construction Company was contracted to build the dams on behalf of the Kerala State Electricity Board.

== 2018 Floods ==
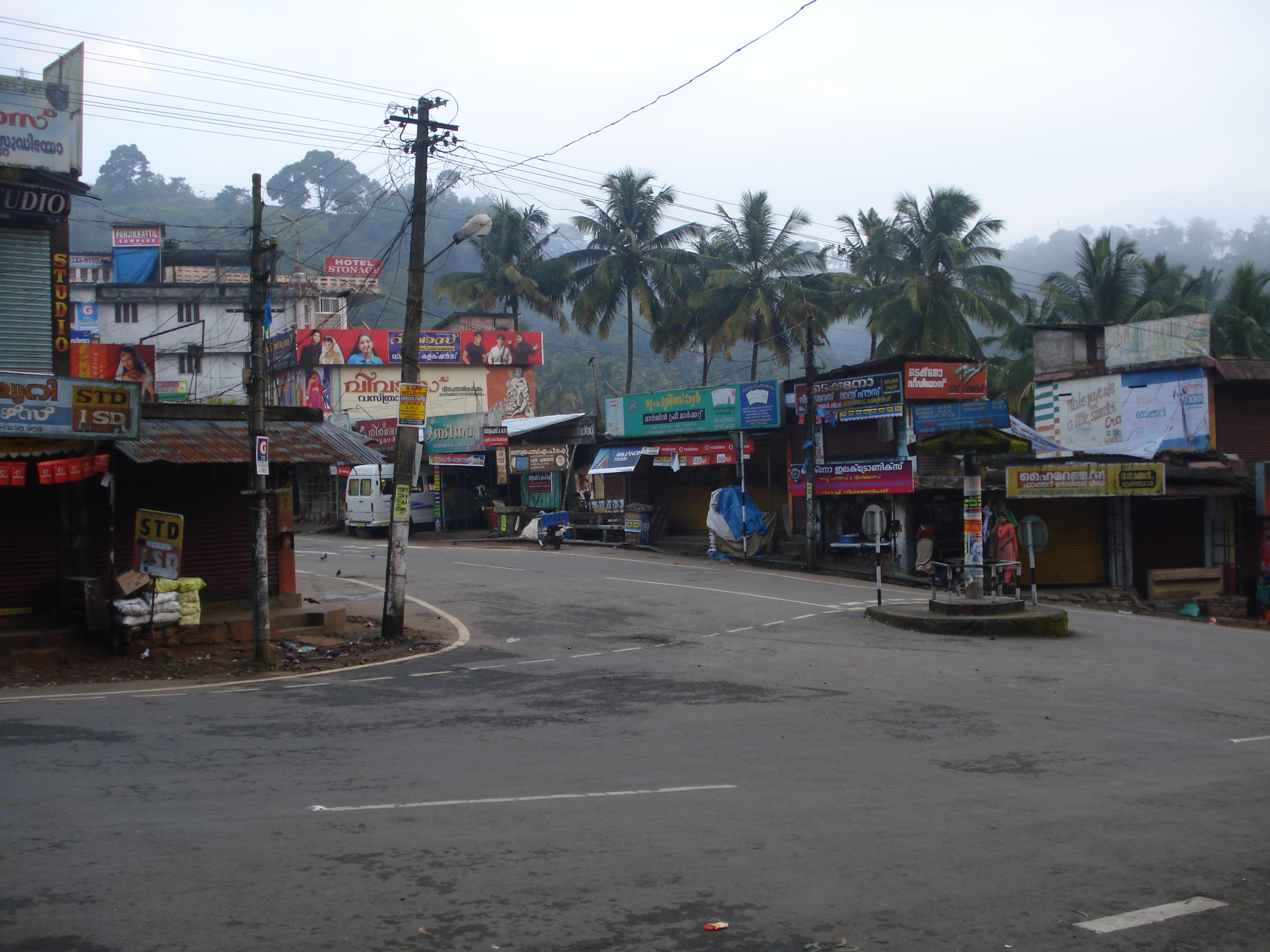
Cheruthoni Junction

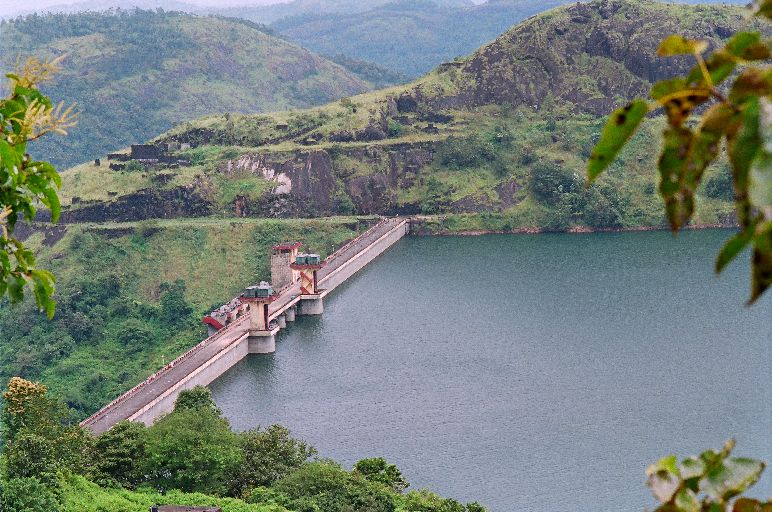
Cheruthoni dam

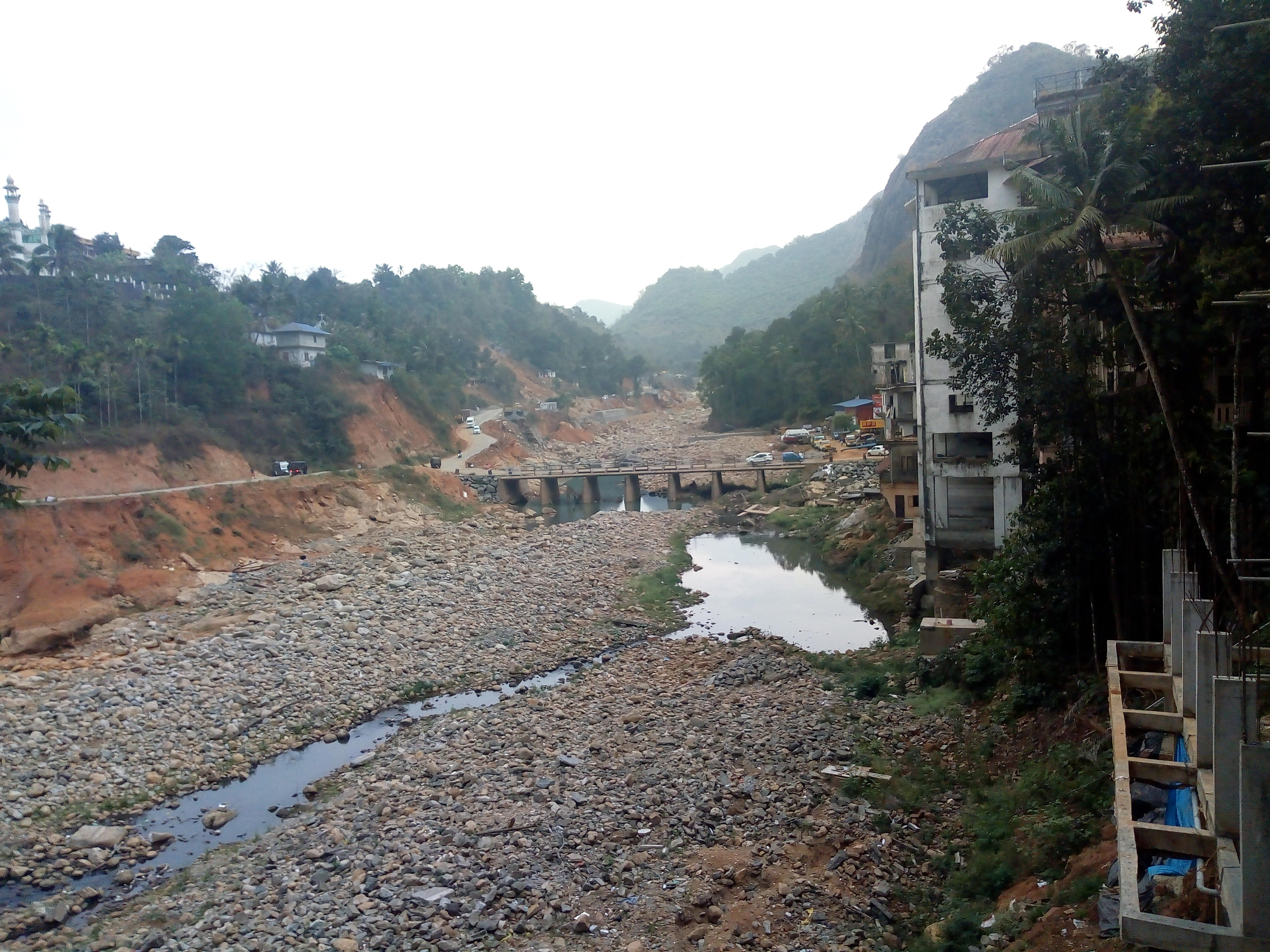
The cheruthoni periyar river after flood
