= Edamalakkudy =

Village in Kerala, India

- Village
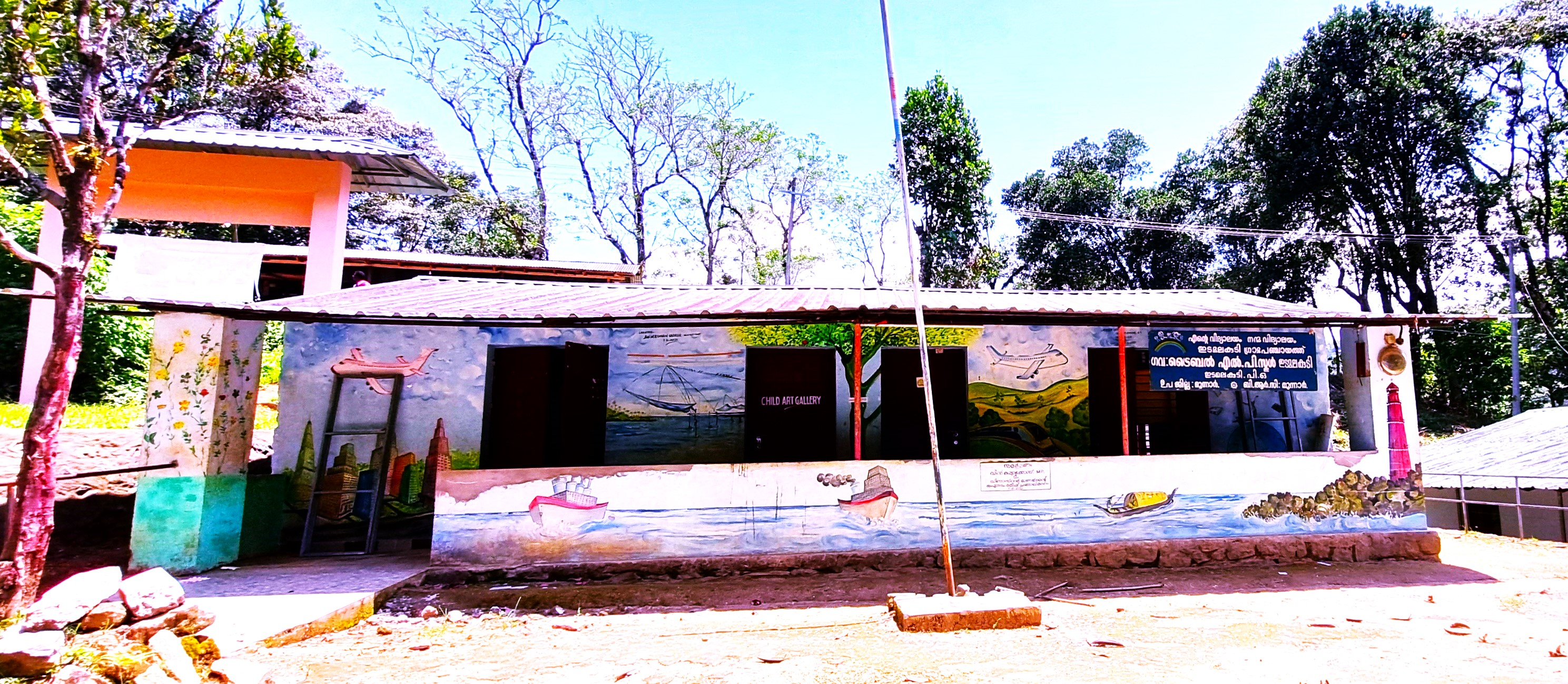
- Govt. Lower Primary School in Edamalakkudy

- Location in Kerala, India Edamalakkudy (India)
- Coordinates: 10°12′19.3″N 76°55′13.3″E10°12'19.3"N 76°55'13.3"E
- Country: India
- State: Kerala
- District: Idukki

Government
  - Type: Panchayat
  - Body: Edamalakkudy Grama Panchayat

Area
  - Total: 106 km^{2} (41 sq mi)

Population (2011)
  - Total: 2,236
  - Density: 21.1/km^{2} (54.6/sq mi)

Languages
  - Official: Malayalam, English
- Time zone: UTC+5:30 (IST)
- PIN: 685561/685612
- Area code: 04865
- Vehicle registration: KL-44
- Website: Official website

Edamalakkudy, or Idamalakkudy, is a remote tribal village and gram panchayat between the Idamalayar Reserve Forest and Mankulam Forest Division of the Anaimalai Hills in the Idukki district of the Indian state of Kerala.

== Location ==
Edamalakudy is located at an elevation of 1100–1700 metres, 22 km north-west of Pettimudi, a village about 4 km west of the Anamudi, the tallest mountain peak in South India on the border of Ernakulam district and Idukki district. Pettimudi was hit by a landslide in 2018 and the debris have not been cleared. Pettimudi is not very remote, but is still not easy to reach as the path is hilly and fog is common and often intense, passing through the Eravikulam National Park, 16 km from Munnar by road and 18 km from Aanakkulam by walking through thick forests. Edamalakkudy is located in a large and mostly remote forest area between Malakkappara and Marayoor in the Anamalais, mainly spread over Ernakulam district, Idukki district, and a part of Thrissur district, which contains the Idamalayar Reserve Forest, covering a large area to the north, west and south of the Edamalayar Dam. The Idamalayar Reserve Forest covers various other tribal villages, spread over parts of eastern Ernakulam district, including Kappayam and Kaserapara. The western parts of the Edamalakkudy gram panchayat, such as Mulakutharakudy are also part of the Idamalayar Reserve Forest, while the rest comes under the Mankulam Forest Division of Kuttampuzha gram panchayat. The forests are surrounded to the south by a range of high-altitude grasslands, which include the village of Pettimudi and the highest peak in South India, the Anamudi. To the south-west is the Idamalayar-Pooyamkutty Valley, and various settlements including Pooyamkutty and Kuttampuzha, as well as Aanakkulam. Edamalakkudy is on this border, Valparai being on the Tamil Nadu side. While the area in Kerala consists of thick and remote forests, the Tamil Nadu area has mostly been deforested for tea plantations. Edamalakkudy was initially not very remote, but the Great flood of 99 which occurred in July 1924 destroyed the old Aluva-Munnar road making it hard to reach. The principal way of reaching Edamalakkudy was via Kuttampuzha-Mankulam at the time. The road was rebuilt till Pooyamkutty. The route via Idamalayar forest was closed to the public in 1985 due to environmental concerns after the construction of the Idamalayar Dam. Therefore, the route via Eravikulam National Park, which is a tourist location, is preferred today.

== Tiger trail ==
The tourism department of the Government of Kerala has decided to make this village an adventure tourism destination. A tiger trail project is being launched in the village. The trekking program will last four days and will start from Kochi. It involves 18 km of walking in forest tracks and staying at the Edamalakudy forest camp. Two jeeps will be used to transport the tourists.

== Travel book ==
In 2016, the first book on Edamalakudy was published by a tribal teacher called P.K.Muraleedharan. The book is called Edamalakkudy Orrum Porulum or 'The truth of Edamalakkudy'. Mr.Muraleedharan was a teacher at Edamalakkudy for seventeen years. He had to trek early in the morning to reach the school He had to evade elephants, snakes and leeches to reach the village. The book was published by SPSS, Kottayam. The book gives details about the lifestyle of the Muthuvan tribal people. Edamalakkudy is a cluster of 26 hamlets scattered in an area of 106 km (66 mi) forest.

== Transportation ==
Aluva railway station and Ernakulam Junction railway station are the nearest major railway stations. Aluva railway station is about 65 km from Aanakkulam and Ernakulam Junction is about 74 km away. Edamalakkudy is 8 km by walk from Aanakkulam. It is possible to reach Idamalayar Dam via Kothamangalam and Bhoothathankettu by road. By walk, Edamalakkudy is about 13 km south-east of the Idamalayar Dam. However, this area is forbidden to the public as it is ecologically sensitive. From Cochin International Airport, Aluva railway station and Ernakulam Junction, buses are available to Munnar. From Munnar it is 18 km by jeep(taking about an hour) to reach Pettimudi village near Rajamala by going through the Eravikulam National Park.From the Eravikulam National Park, jeeps are provided by the Forest Department. The work on the 22 km stretch to Edamalakkudy will be delayed. The government of Kerala allotted Rs.2 crore for the road. Another Rs.8 crore was allotted for the development of the village. The road contract was first given to VSS and later to KITCO. The road is required of the villagers as they are unable to use vehicles to transport goods. However, it is unlikely that the Forest Department will approve of it as the area is protected and ecologically sensitive.

== Economy ==
The tribal people live by selling cardamom. Tapioca is grown across the village on hills. The population density of the village is low, with houses standing far away from each other. Facilities available include a hospital, gram panchayat office and two schools.

== Administration ==
In 2010, a separate panchayath was created for administering Edamalakkudy-it was earlier part of Kuttampuzha panchayat. Thus it became the first tribal panchayath of Kerala state. A new road was also planned under the NREWP. Edamalakudy is panchayath included in Kothamangalam Taluk in Ernakulam District of Kerala in India. It was earlier part of Idukki district, but in 1998, Kuttampuzha panchayat was added to Ernakulam district. It belongs to Central Kerala Division. It is located 88 km east of the district headquarters Kakkanad and 205 km from State capital Thiruvananthapuram. Edamalakudy has the pincodes is 685561 and 685612:685561 which covers a large and mostly remote forest areas from Malakkappara to Marayoor, over three districts, Thrissur district, Ernakulam district and Idukki district, containing only one town, Adimali, the rest being inside forest, while 685612 has its headquarters in Munnar. The villagers need to post or receive letters from either Adimali or Munnar. Distance to nearby settlements:Kuttampuzha(33 km), Pooyamkutty(26 km), Aanakkulam(8 km), Kothamangalam(53 km), Mankulam(12 km), Vellathooval (42 km), Pallivasal (40 km), Munnar (43 km), Chinnakanal (56 km), Rajakkad (50 km), and Malakkappara(about 23–25 km). Edamalakudy is surrounded by the Idamalayar Dam-Pooyamkutty area and Malakkappara to the north-west and west, Aanakkulam to the south-West, Devikulam to the south, Marayoor to the east, and Valparai to the North.

== Demography ==
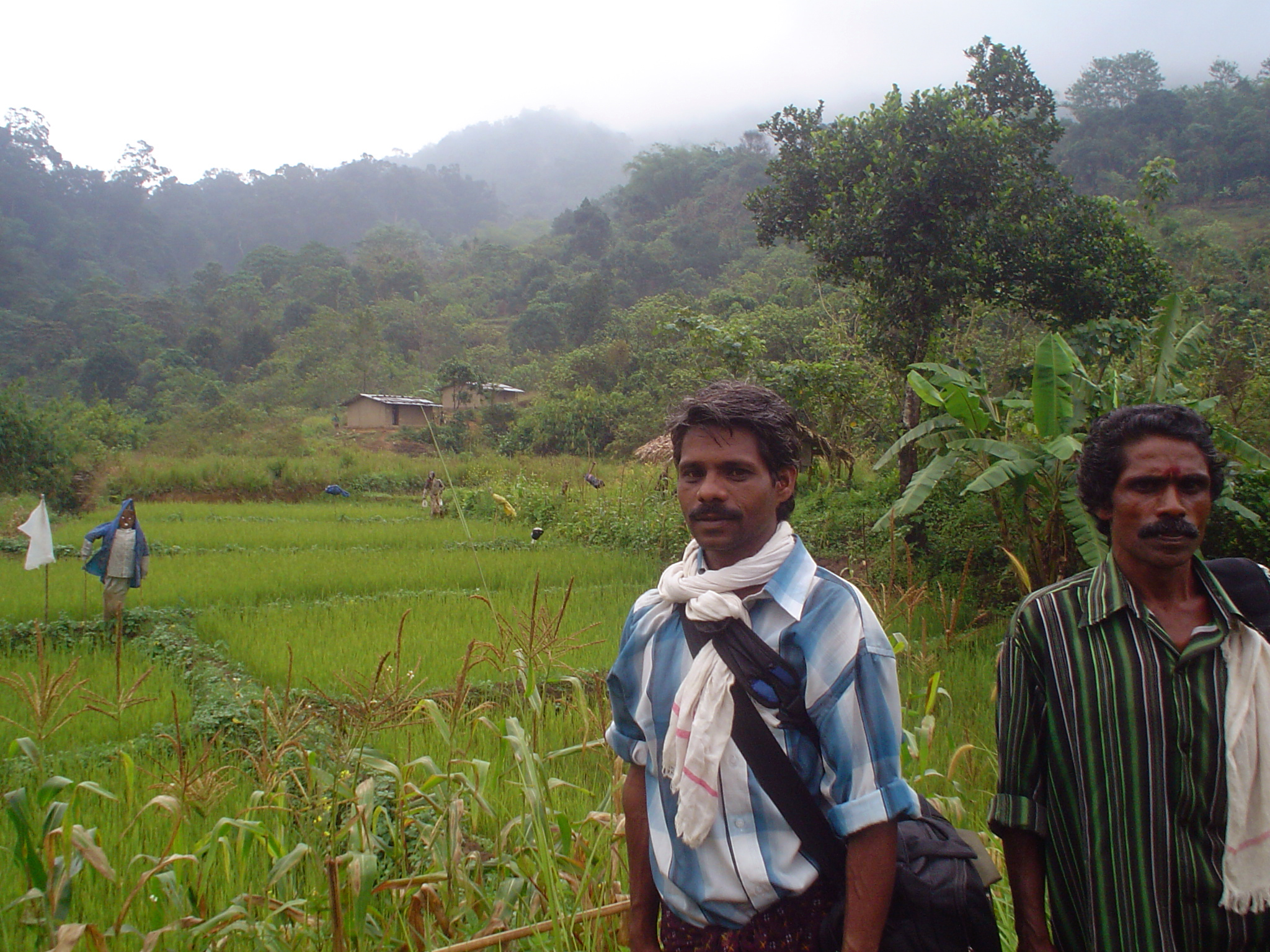
People at Edamalakkudi

About 600 people live in Edamalakkudy in 18 houses. Recent interventions by the Kerala government looked into issues like food security, education, medical facilities and drinking water supply.

In 2015, all the villagers of Edamalakkudy were given the Indian social security card Aadhaar. A special camp was held for this purpose at the nearby village of Societykudy. The panchayat office of Edamalakkudy is also located at Societykudy. The government is planning to provide e-banking facility and internet facility in the near future.

== Education ==
There is one tribal primary school and ten nursery schools in this village. There is a school at Erupukalkudy, located between the main hamlet of Edamalakkudy and Aanakkulam. The government conducts teacher training programs for the tribals. Free study materials are also distributed to the students.

== Elections, 2016 ==
During the legislative elections of 2016, 180 government officials applied for this location in spite of its remoteness. 12 were selected to conduct the election. To reach the polling station, they had to travel 44 km by road and then walk three km deep inside the forest. The polling team was assisted by another 40 officials including the police, forest and medical team. Ham radio was used for communication as other modes were not accessible. There were nearly 1,800 voters in this station. The government officers opted this hard location because it is otherwise restricted to visitors. Volunteers of various political parties also visited the village for campaigning. During the trip to the polling station deep inside the forest, there were many hitches like the presence of wild animals. In spite of some delay, the polling team managed to arrive at the station well in time. The village has no motor-able road, no power or communication network. 700 families live here.

== Infrastructure ==
The village council sits not in Edamalakkudy but in the next village called Societykudy. The work of the village council is a little challenging as there is no electric and internet connection. Telephones are also absent. An extension office of the village council is situated at Devikulam town. During the monsoon, the footpath from Pettimudy to Edamalakkudy gets washed away. Because of the inaccessibility, only tribal Councillors attend the village council meeting at Societykudy. The bureaucratic assistants and the commissioners are not able to make it. Edamalakkudy is not a single village but a cluster of about 26 hamlets scattered in 35,000 acres of deep forest. Each hamlet is about three to ten km away from the next one.

== Wildlife ==
Bengal tigers and Asian elephants are sighted frequently near Edamalakkudy. Other mammals found around Edamalakkudy include the gaur, dhole, chital, sambar deer, Indian leopard, Nilgiri tahr, Indian muntjac, Nilgiri langur, Tufted grey langur, Fishing cat, and Indian giant squirrel. Blackbucks are known to occasionally stray from the drier deciduous forests of the neighbouring Tamil Nadu state. Edamalakkudy is one of the most attractive wildlife spots in Kerala. Special permission from Forest Department is needed to visit this village as the area spanning from the Idamalayar Dam across this village, to Pooyamkutty southwards and Marayoor eastwards is ecologically very sensitive and therefore protected. Various endemic butterfly species are found, including Mycalesis igilia, Colias nilagiriensis, and Heteropsis oculus among others. Common moth species are Ancylolomia cervicella, Ancylolomia dives, various Sphingidae, Chiasmia nora, and Herpetogramma species, as well as many endemic species.

== Muthuvan tribe ==
The Muthuvans are the only type of people living in Edamalakkudy. They are also found in other Kerala villages like Kanthalloor, Marayoor, Vattavada, Chinnakkal, Mankulam, Munnar, Shanthanppara, Adimali and Rajakumari. However, they are more common in parts of eastern Ernakulam district, including Edamalakkudy Panchayat and around Malakkappara.'Muthu' means back and 'van' means one who carries weight on the back. The language of the Muthuvan tribals is not Malayalam but a dialect closely related to Tamil. They live in dormitories called 'chavadies' and boys and girls are accommodated separately. The village head is called Kani and has great control on everything in the village. He presides over the meeting of the Council of Elders. The Muthuvan community is known for their organic farming of paddy and ragi. Shifting cultivation every two years is common. Cardamom and pepper are also cultivated. The Muthuvans believes in purity and pollution as a value system.

The provincial government of Kerala has sought the help of the National Biodiversity Authority of India to intervene for the preserving and conservation of the traditional way of life of the Edamalakkudy people. Some interventions were required in fields like power, drinking water and housing.

== Communication ==
The only operator to have mobile coverage in such a harsh terrain is BSNL. They have their mobile tower in Societykudy where connectivity to the mobile site is via satellite link.

Two more BSNL sites have come up recently in the road towards Edamalakudy from Rajamala, a kilometre south of Pettimudi and Rajamala Factory which are mainly tea plantation settlements and major contact points for people from Edamalakudy. Some kudies (name for small settlement of tribals in Edamalakudy village), scattered along this vast forest areas, still have no mobile coverage but have to rely on Ham Radio. The Ham network was extensively used by the government to conduct the legislative election in the village during 2016.

== See also ==
- Mankulam
