= Neriamangalam Bridge =

Bridge in the South Indian state of Kerala

Neriamangalam Bridge നേര്യമംഗലം പാലം
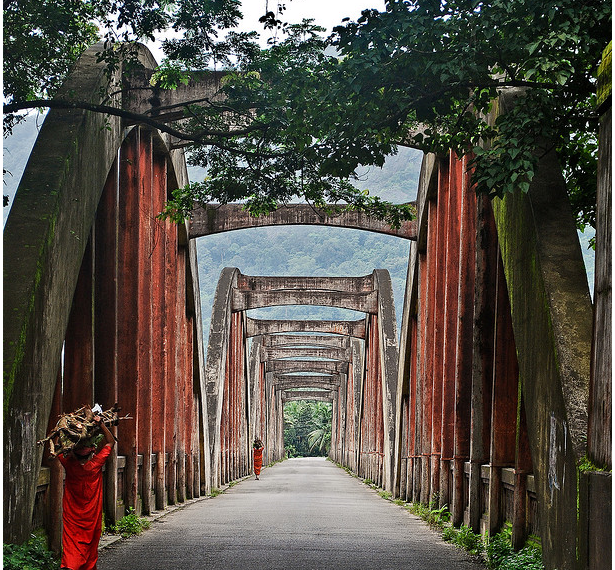
- Coordinates: 10°3′32.7″N 76°46′33.6″E
- Carries: NH 85
- Crosses: Periyar River

Characteristics
- Total length: 214 m
- Width: 4.9 m

History
- Inaugurated: 2 March 1935

Location
- Interactive map of Neriamangalam Bridge

The Neriamangalam Bridge is a bridge in the South Indian state of Kerala, that connects the Ernakulam and Idukki districts. Opened in 1935, it is the first Class A arch bridge in Asia. Popularly known as the gateway to the high ranges, it is located in Neriamangalam and presently a part of NH 85.

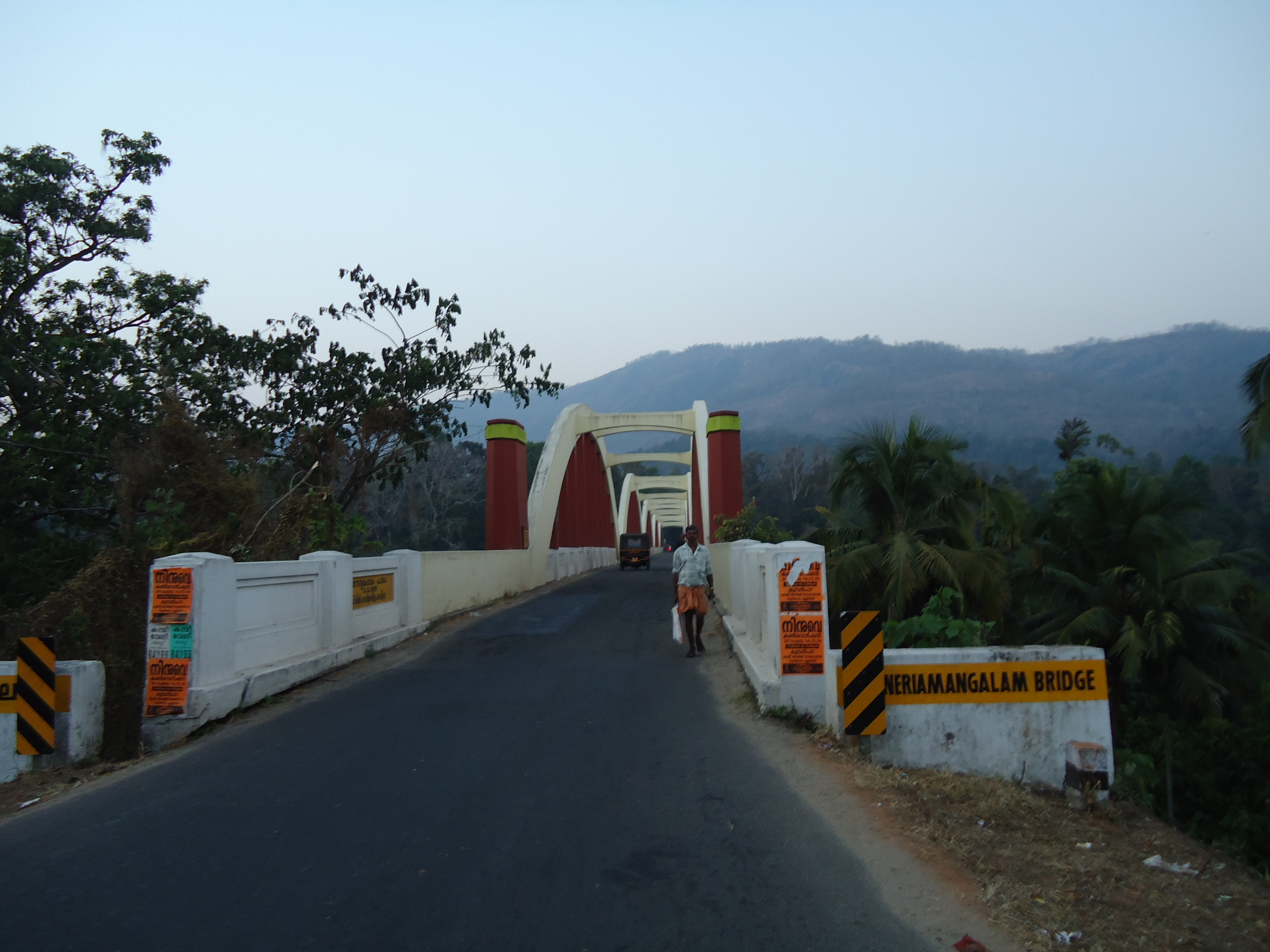
Bridge from Neriamangalam Side

== History ==
The railway and ropeway built by the British were destroyed in 1924 due to the great flood of 99. The road from Pooyamkutty to Mankulam was also damaged, ceasing the trade relations of high range with Kochi. Subsequently, Maharani Sethu Lakshmibai ordered the construction of a new road from Aluva to Munnar and a new bridge across Periyar to transport tea, aromatic crops and trees from the high range to Kochi. The new road was inaugurated in March 1931 by Maharani Sethulakshmi Bhai. The construction of the Neriamangalam bridge was started in 1924 and was opened on 2 March 1935 by Srichithira Tirunal Balaramavarma. In view of the strong currents that may occur in Periyar during the rainy season, the bridge is constructed in an arched shape to withstand the force of the water. The bridge has been instrumental in the growth of high range of Kerala since 1935. It also paved the way for migration of people from different parts of Kerala to high range. The bridge has been completed in five spans with a length of 214 meters and a width of 4.9 meters. The arches of the bridge are connected to the spans. It is made of surkhi and granite, which is a mixture of jaggery and lime. Since its inauguration, Neriamangalam bridge, has survived the great floods of 1961 and 2018.

== See also ==
- Marthanda Varma Bridge
