= Subramanya Temple, Munnar =

Subramanya Swami Temple Munnar
- திரு சுப்ரமணிய ஸ்வாமி திருக்கோவில், மூணாறு ശ്രീ സുബ്രഹ്മണ്യ സ്വാമി ക്ഷേത്രം, മൂന്നാർ
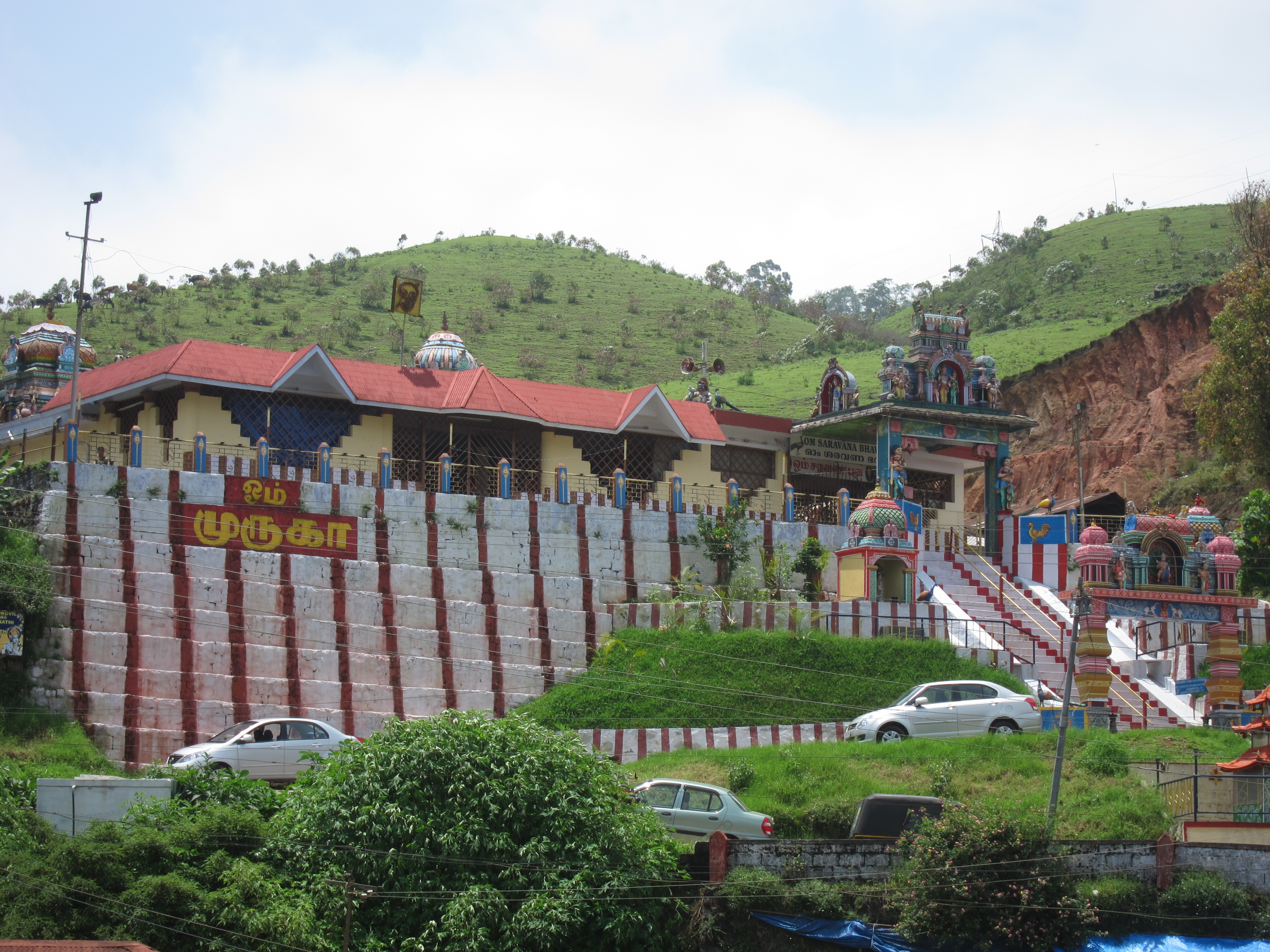
- Subramanya Swami temple Munnar

- Location in Kerala Subramanya Temple, Munnar (Kerala) Subramanya Temple, Munnar (Tamil Nadu)

Religion
- Affiliation: Hinduism
- District: Idukki
- Deity: Kartikeya
- Festival: Karthika Deepam

Location
- Location: Munnar
- State: Kerala
- Country: India
- Interactive map of Subramanya Swami Temple Munnar
- Coordinates: 10°05′21.2″N 77°03′39.4″E

Architecture
- Type: Mixture of Kerala and Tamil architecture

Specifications
- Temple: One
- Elevation: 1,480.74 m (4,858 ft)

Sri Subramanya Temple is a Hindu temple located in Munnar in Idukki district in the Indian state of Kerala. Lord Muruga is the principal deity.

== Poojas ==
Three poojas are held every day including 'Usha pooja' in morning section, 'Ucha pooja' in noon section and 'Attazha pooja' in desk section.

== Festivals ==
The annual festival 'Thrikarthika' is hosted in the Malayalam month of Vrischikam (i.e. November to December). Uthram asterism day in Meenam (i.e. March to April) is also an important festival.

== Temple ==
This temple located on a small hill was worshipped by the Muthuvan tribal community in the past. Later it was closed for a long time. But seeing the pathetic condition, the temple was renovated by the members of Travancore royal family when they came to visit Munnar during the summer season. Earlier Nambudiris held the tantric rights of the temple. At present the rights are held by local Tamil Brahmins. The temple is now administered by a committee of local Hindus.
