= Muppathi Moonu Waterfalls =

Waterfalls in Kerala, India

- Location: Mankulam, Idukki district, Kerala, India

Muppathi Moonu Waterfalls is located in Idukki district in Kerala, India. Located in Mankulam, it originates from a forest and is mostly visited by tourists, who visits Anakkulam for trekking and site seeing of elephants.
