= Mankulam =

Mankulam may refer to:

- Mankulam (Kerala)
- Maankulam (Sri Lanka)
