= Neriamangalam =

- village
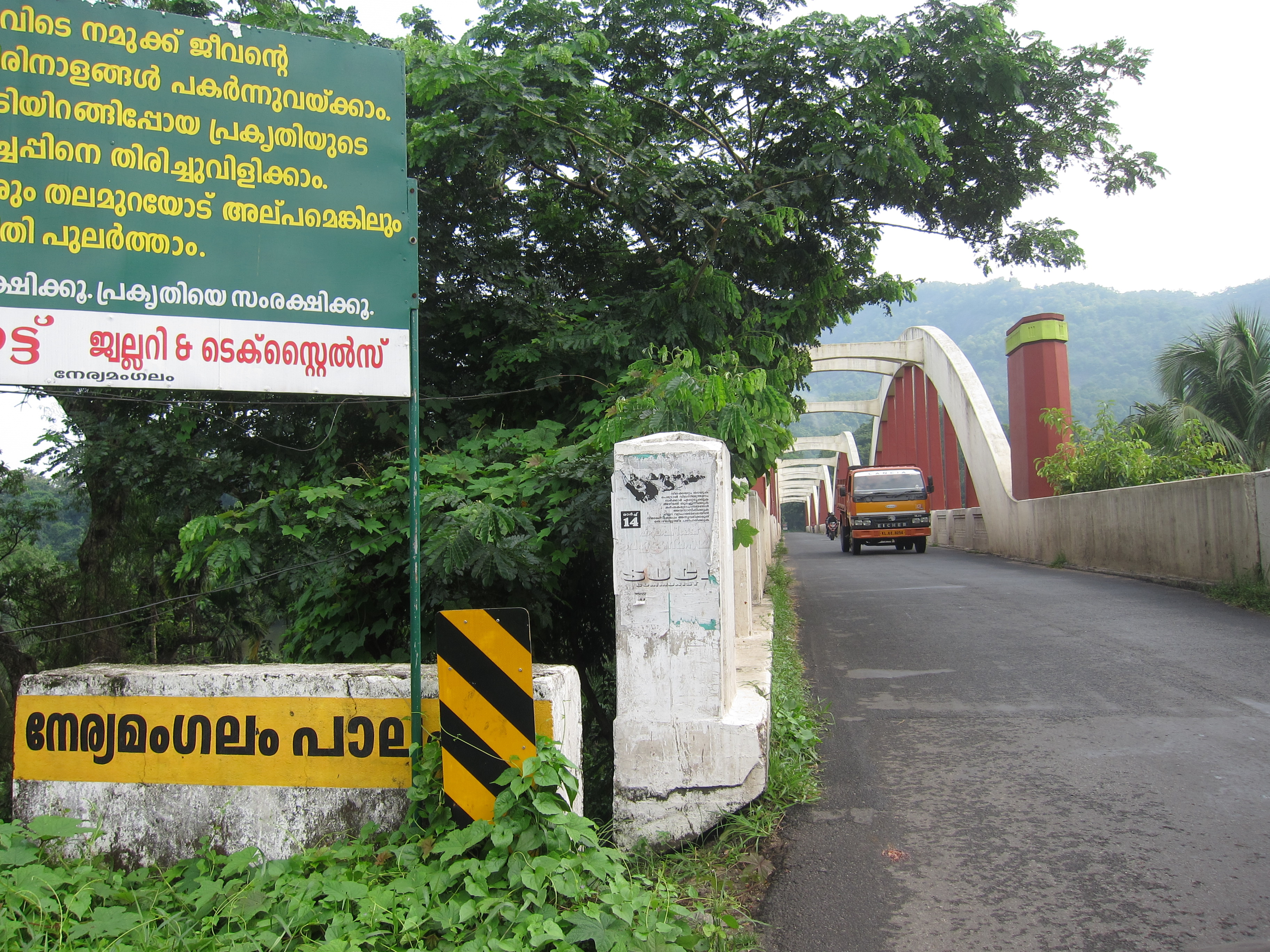
- Neriamangalam bridge

- Location in Kerala, India Neriamangalam (India)
- Coordinates: 10.05311°N 76.73986°E
- Country: India
- State: Kerala
- District: Ernakulam

Population (2011)
  - Total: 15,994

Languages
  - Official: Malayalam, English
- Time zone: UTC+5:30 (IST)
- PIN: 686693
- Telephone code: 0485
- Vehicle registration: KL-44
- Nearest city: Kochi
- Lok Sabha constituency: Idukki
- Vidhan Sabha constituency: Kothamangalam

Neriamangalam is a village in Ernakulam district in the Indian state of Kerala. Neriamangalam is on the banks of Periyar River. It is on the border of Ernakulam and Idukki districts. Agriculture is the predominant occupation in this area. The Neriamangalam Bridge, Ranikallu (stone of queen) etc. are of historical importance. The Neriamangalam Bridge, built across the Periyar river, is often referred as 'The Gateway to the Highranges' as it is on the way to the higher regions of Idukki district, especially Munnar. The bridge was made by the Maharaja of Travancore in 1935. Now the bridge is a part of National Highway 85 which leads to Dhanushkodi in Tamil Nadu. The St Joseph's church, Neriamangalam is a major place of worship for Syro-Malabar Christians of this region. The Jawahar Navodaya Vidyalaya, Neriamangalam is an important educational institution in this region.The nearest town is Kothamangalam, Neriamangalam gets one of the highest average rainfall in the state of Kerala. So this place is aptly hailed as 'The Cherrapunjee of Kerala'. The nearest town is Kothamangalam, which is about 17.6 km (11 mi) from Neriamangalam.

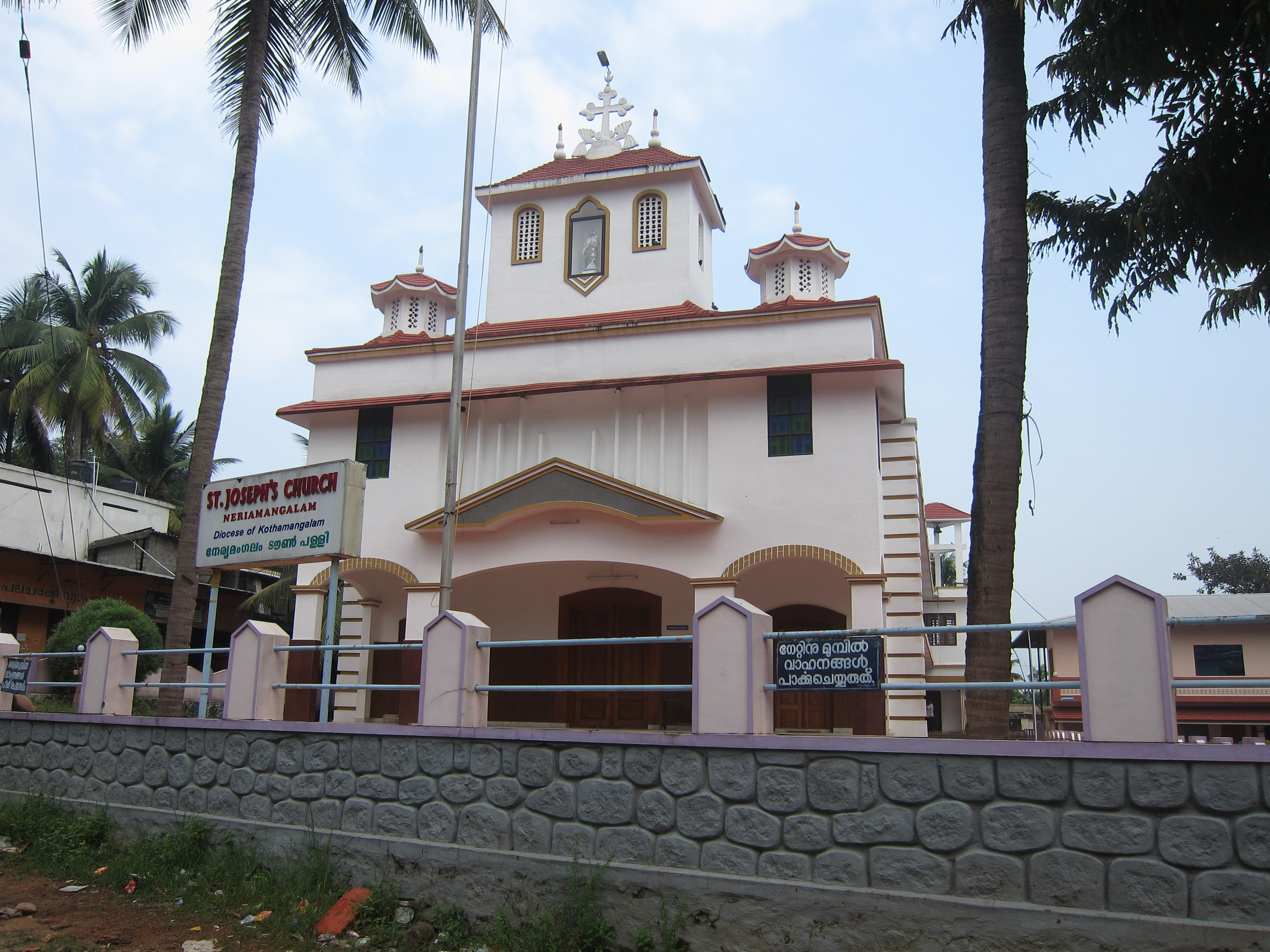
Town Church

== Demographics ==
As of 2011 India census, Neriamangalam had a population of 15,994 with 8,017 males and 7,977 females.
