= Mangalapuzha bridge =

Bridge in Kerala, India

Mangalapuzha Bridge
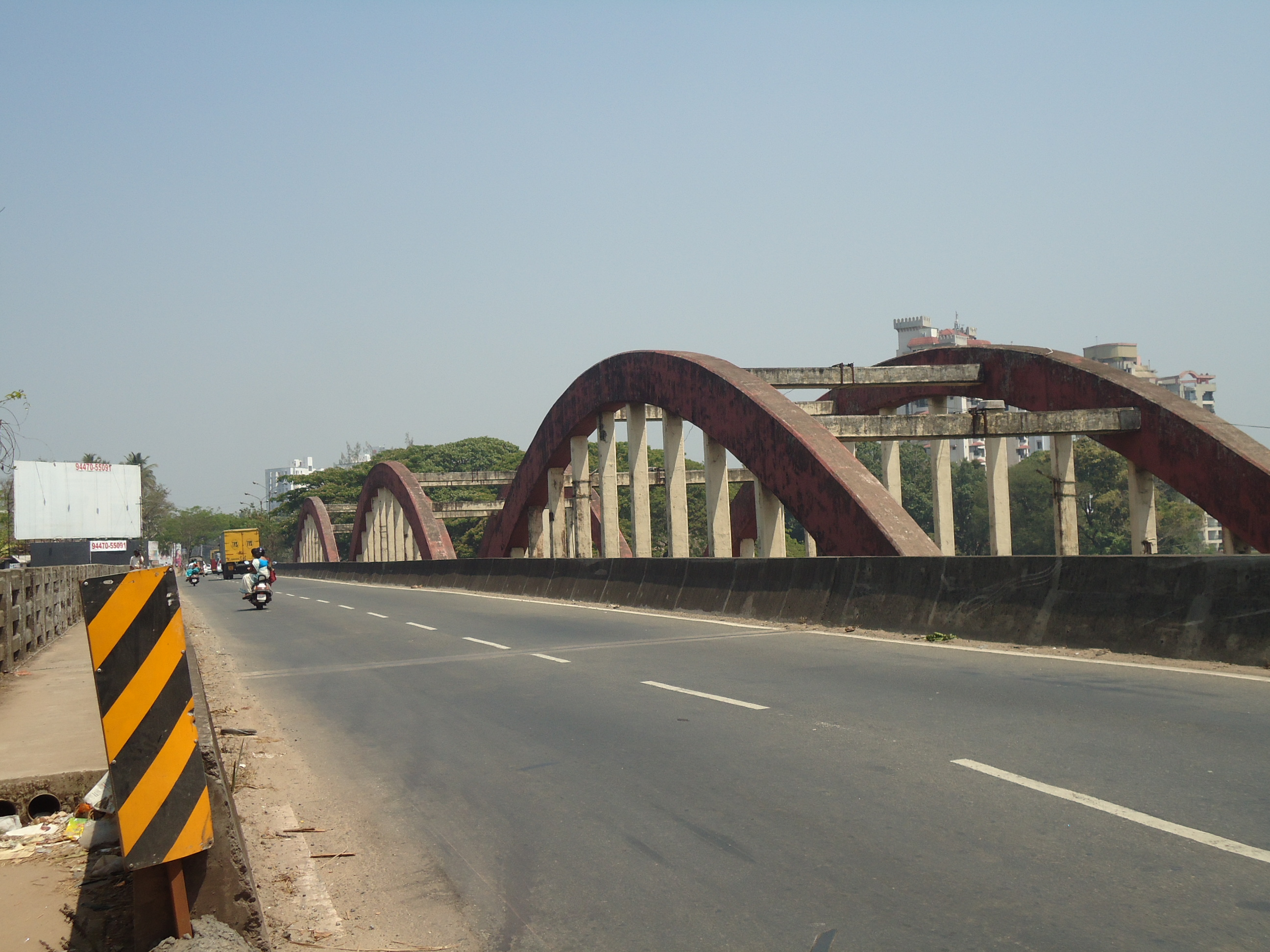
- Coordinates: 10.12625°N 76.34113°E
- Carries: NH 47 (now NH 544)
- Crosses: Periyar River
- Locale: Aluva, Kerala, India

History
- Constructed by: Techni Bharathi Ltd (new bridge)
- Opened: 25 September 1960 (Old Bridge); 2004 (New Bridge)

The Mangalapuzha bridge is a bridge in Aluva, Kerala, India. This bridge connects Desom and Aluva town. This bridge is situated 3 km away from Marthanda Varma Bridge and is a part of NH 47 Highway passing through Aluva. Aluva Pontifical seminary is situated near this bridge. A new bridge was constructed parallel to old bridge to widen the NH47. The construction of the new bridge was done by Techni Bharathi Ltd in 2004. This bridge is situated 9 km from Cochin International Airport near Desom.

== History ==
The original Mangalapuzha Bridge's foundation stone had been laid on February 5, 1956, by Dr. Rajendra Prasad, the first President of India. Before the construction of this bridge, people used rafts to cross the Periyar River at this location to travel towards Thrissur. The completion of the Mangalapuzha Bridge eliminated the need for these rafts. The bridge was opened to traffic on May 25, 1960. It's a crucial part of National Highway 47, connecting Salem, Cochin and Kanyakumari. A new bridge, constructed parallel to the original structure, was inaugurated on June 22, 2002, to accommodate increased traffic, costing ₹8 crore (equivalent to ₹31 crore or US$3.6 million in 2023).

== Structure ==
The Mangalapuzha bridge has a total length of 491 feet. It features two spans of 162 feet each and one span of 166' 9" at the left end. The 166' 9" span was the longest span in at the time of construction for bow string girders. The superstructure is made of reinforced cement concrete (RCC) bow string girders, with the roadway located at the springing level. The design accounts for Indian Road Congress (IRC) Class AA loading. The clear width of the roadway is 24 feet. Construction involved approximately 1,100 tons of cement and 500 tons of steel. The total construction cost was around ₹16 lakh (equivalent to ₹18 crore or US$2.2 million in 2023), with an approximate cost per running foot of ₹3,000 (equivalent to ₹343,052 in 2023).

== Traffic and maintenance ==
The Mangalapuzha Bridge, as a critical part of a national highway, is subject to periodic maintenance. These activities often lead to traffic congestion in the bridge vicinity. When maintenance work is underway, authorities typically implement traffic restrictions. These measures may include limiting the operational lanes on the bridge, for instance, to a single lane. Traffic management plans may also involve adjusting access points, such as the U-turn at Seminaripadi, requiring vehicles to utilize alternative turning areas like Paravoorkavala. Such strategies are employed to manage disruption and ensure traffic safety during periods of bridge maintenance.

== Plates on the bridge ==
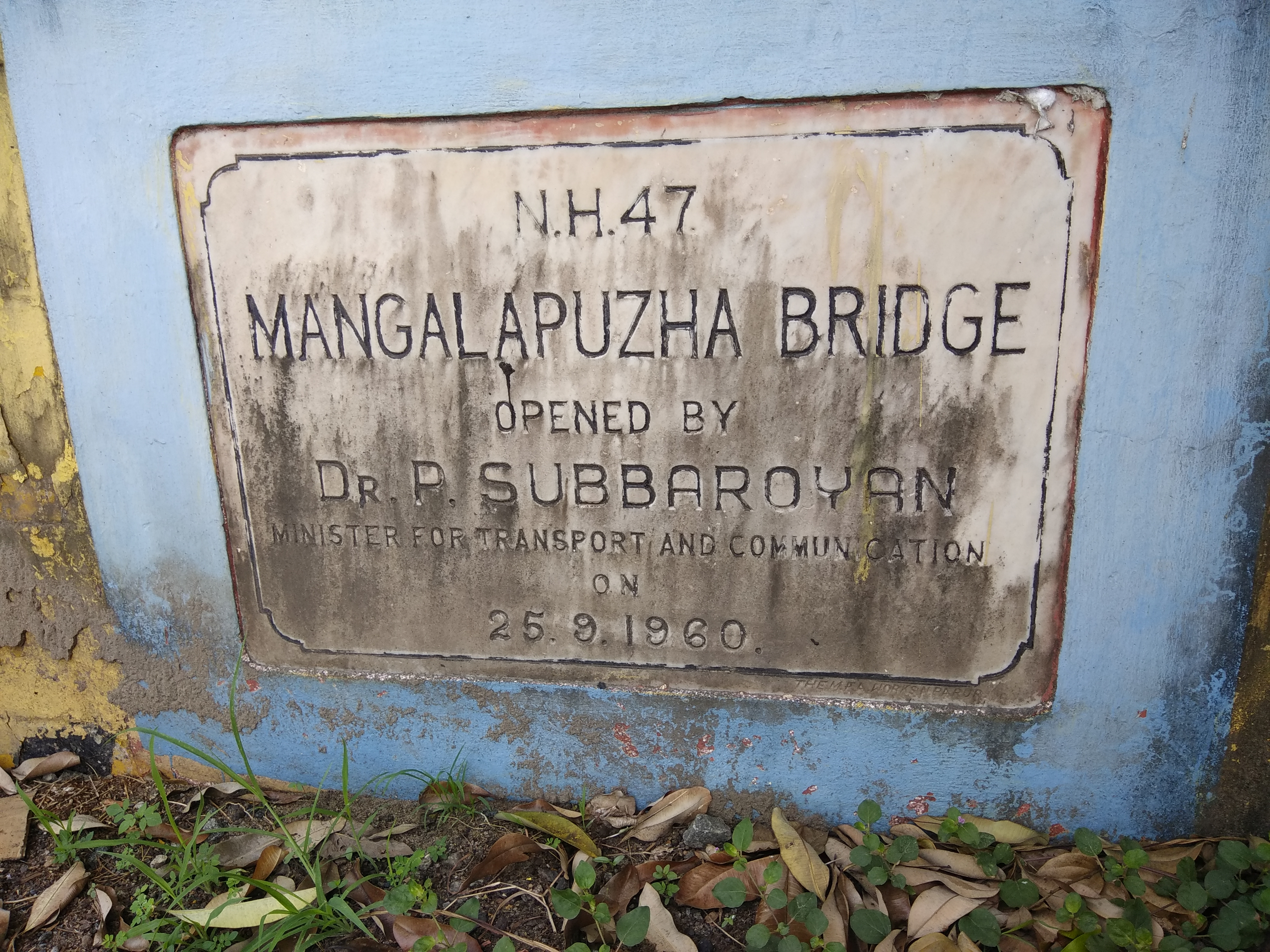
Opened by Dr. P. Subbaroyan on 25 September 1960

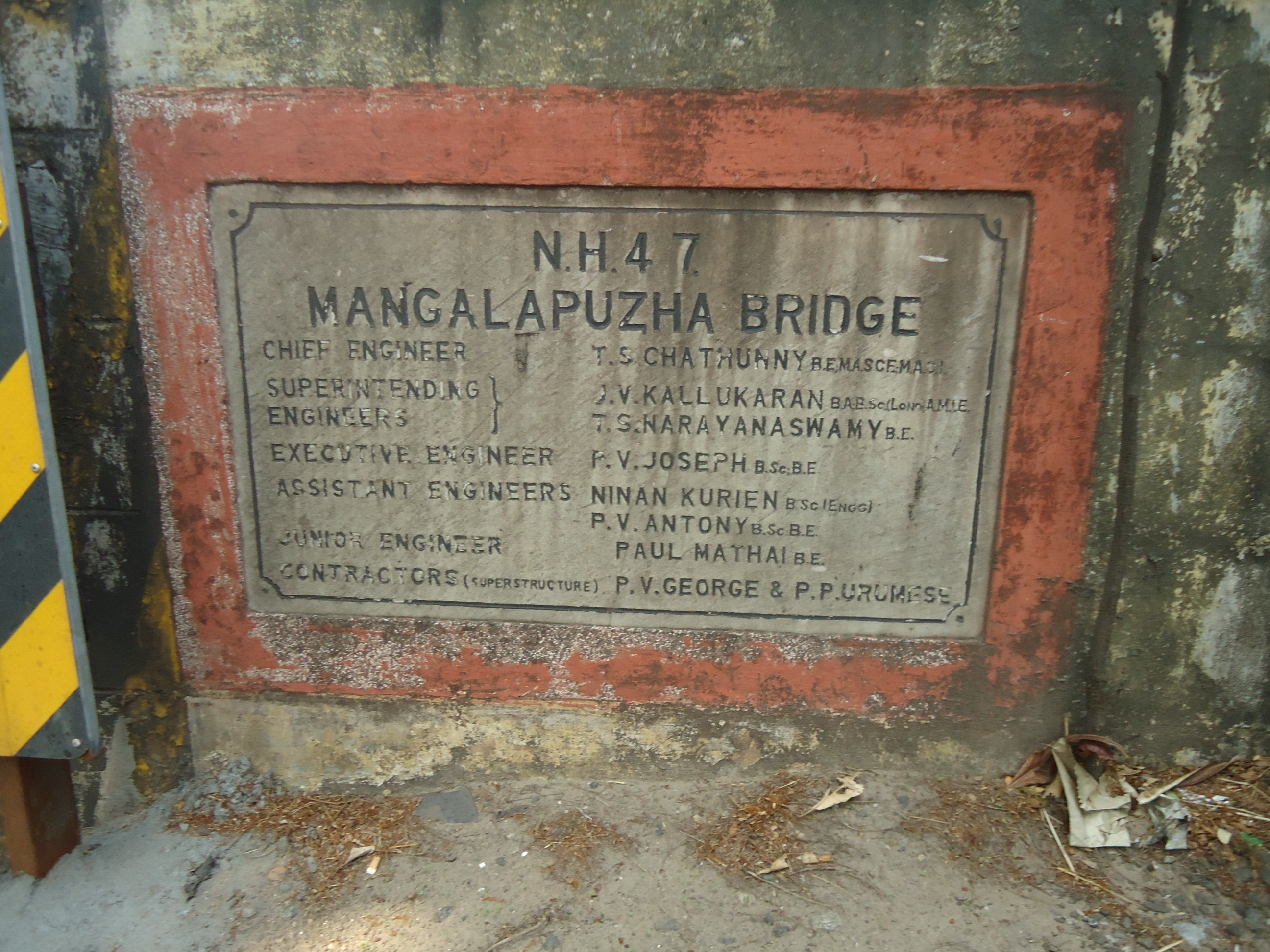
Details of the Engineers and Contractors

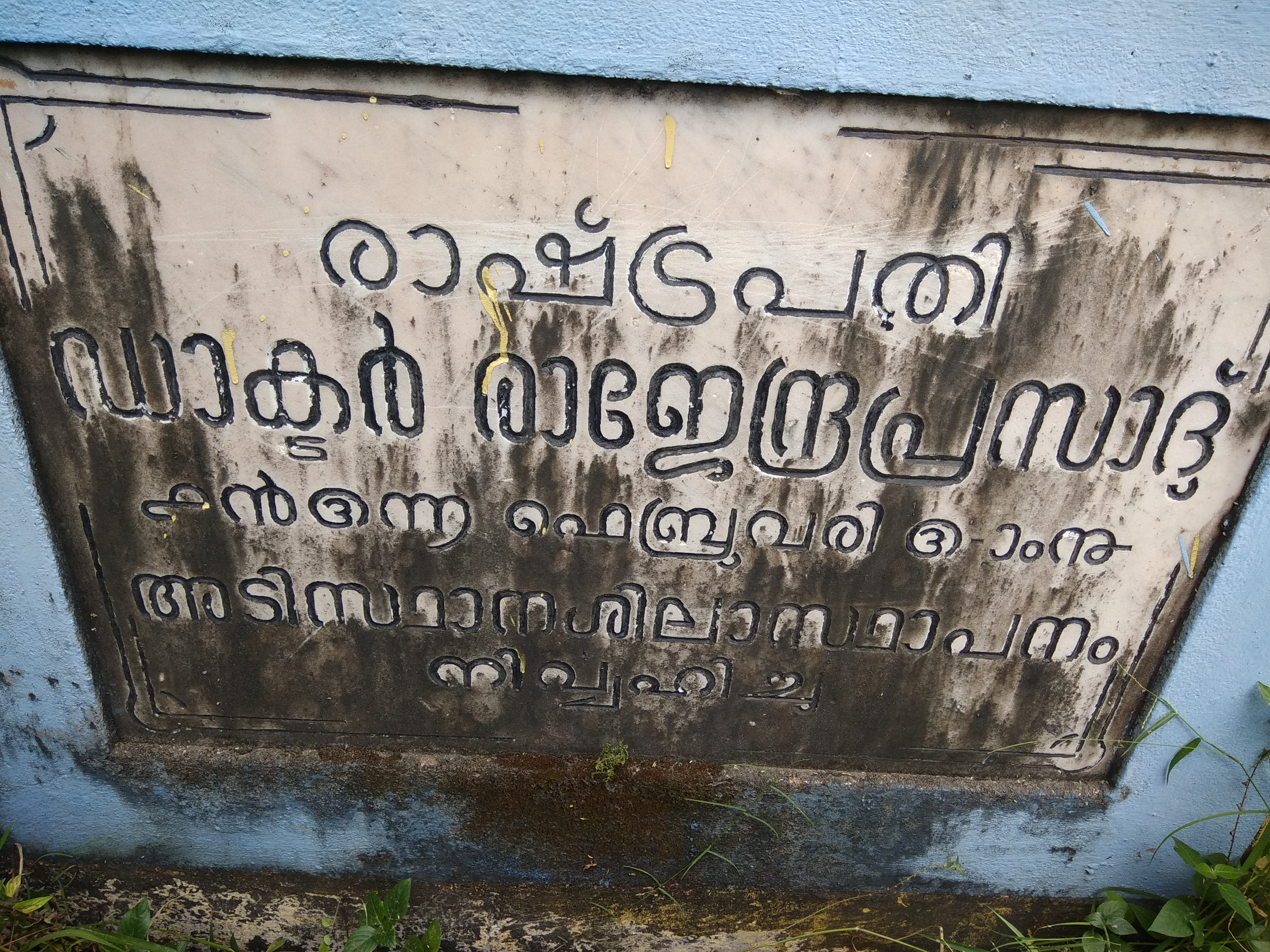
Dr. Rajendra Prasad laid the foundation stone on 5 February 1956
