= Marthanda Varma Bridge =

Bridge across Periyar in Aluva, India

Marthanda Varma Bridge മാർത്താണ്ഡവർമപ്പാലം
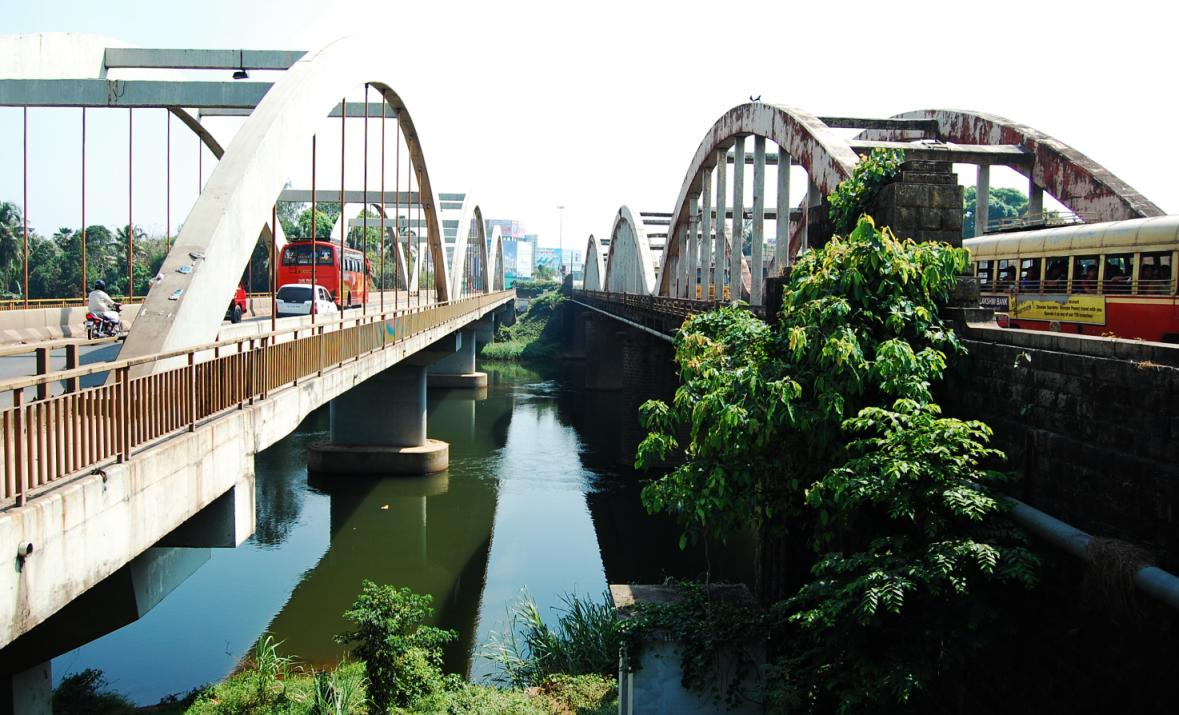
- The old bridge on right and the new bridge on left
- Coordinates: 10°06′44″N 76°20′52″E
- Carries: NH 544
- Crosses: Periyar River
- Locale: Aluva, Kerala, India

Characteristics
- Total length: 141 m
- Width: 5.5 m

History
- Engineering design by: GBS Truscourt; M.L. Duraiswamy
- Constructed by: JB Gammon Company
- Construction start: 1937 (old bridge)
- Construction end: 1940 (old bridge)
- Construction cost: ₹8 lakhs (old bridge) ₹8 crore (new bridge)
- Inaugurated: 14 June 1940 (old bridge); 22 June 2002 (new bridge)

Location
- Interactive map of Marthanda Varma Bridge

Marthanda Varma Bridge is a twin-bridge located in the city of Aluva, in the Ernakulam district, Kerala, India. The bridges lie on the NH 544 connecting the banks of the Periyar River. The old bridge opened in June 1940 is the second arch bridge in Asia, which was built in memory of Marthanda Varma, the sculptor of Travancore. A new bridge was built parallel to the old bridge to increase the traffic capabilities to four lanes, which was opened to the public in June 2002. The Marthanda Varma Bridge is regarded as one of the most important landmarks of Aluva and played a major role in its development into an industrial city. It has been featured in many Malayalam films and literary works.

== History ==
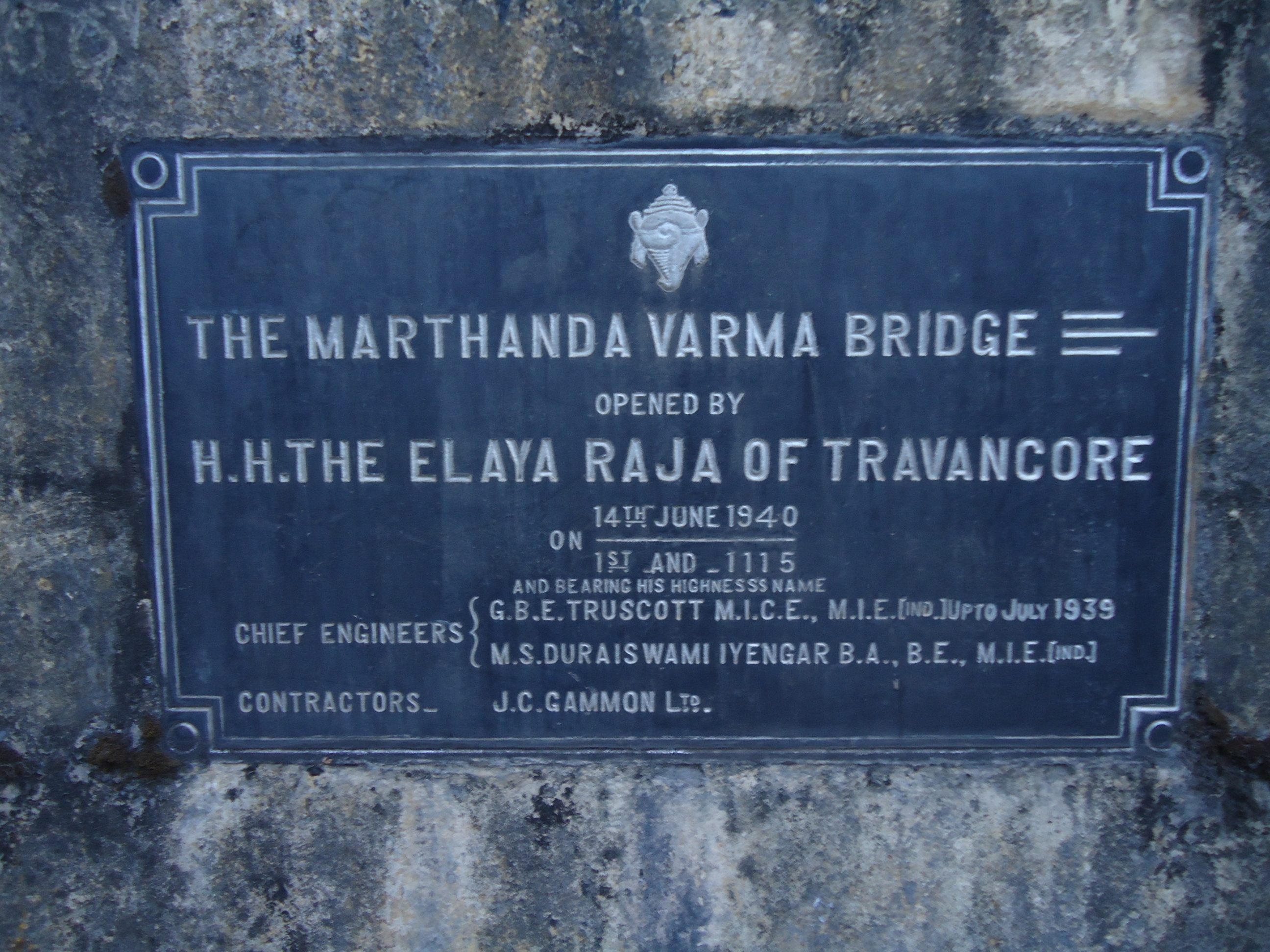
Plaque of the Bridge

Alangad and Paravur were the territories given to Travancore by the King of Cochin as a reward for driving out the Samoothiri with the help of the Dutch army. Marthanda Varma Bridge was built so that members of the Travancore royal family could go to Alangad and Paravur without boarding a raft from Aluva to cross the Periyar river The construction of the Marthanda Varma Bridge was started in 1937. The contract of eight lakh rupees was given to JB Gammon Company. The construction was done using all the important technologies of that time. A shock absorbing system, which is still working, was constructed by installing giant springs on concrete slabs at six places under the deck of the bridge. These springs were imported from Italy. The 5.5 meter wide and 141 meter long bridge has three arches on both sides. The crest of the Travancore princely state is still on the plaque.

GBS Truscourt and M.L. Duraiswamy Iyengar were the chief engineers. While the construction was in progress, a major landslide accident happened on 21 November 1938 around 9.30 pm. The tragedy happened when a ten feet wide and 20 feet long deep trench was dug and the soil was removed for the construction of the handrail. 11 people were trapped under the fallen soil and stones out of which 10 died. Despite these difficulties, the bridge was completed in three years. Although the technical facilities were very less, the work was completed in a short time. The earthwork sub-contract of the bridge was taken by former municipal chairman Pattamana George and Ittan Thomas. There is still a pillar in the Periyar river that was tilted during construction. As it could not be removed, another piling was being done nearby.

The bridge that was inaugurated on 14 June 1940 by Ilayaraja Marrthanda Varma. However, the bridge was built by Srichithira Tirunal Balaramavarma in memory of Marthanda Varma. As his younger brother's name was Marthanda Varma, he was chosen to inaugurate the bridge. On the occasion of the inauguration, 19 lorries and three elephants walked across the bridge. At this time Engineer G.B.S. Truscourt, his wife and son were sitting in a boat on the river. He moved away from the opening platform and stationed himself under the bridge to check the stability of the bridge. 12 years after the construction of the Marthandavarma bridge, another arch bridge was constructed across the Periyar at Mangalapuzha, 2 km away. With that bridge known as Mangalapuzha bridge, there was no need for a raft to go to Thrissur. After 62 years, when the traffic increased, another bridge with the same shape came up parallel to the bridge. It was inaugurated on 22 June 2002. Its construction was completed at a cost of ₹8 crores.

== Gallery ==
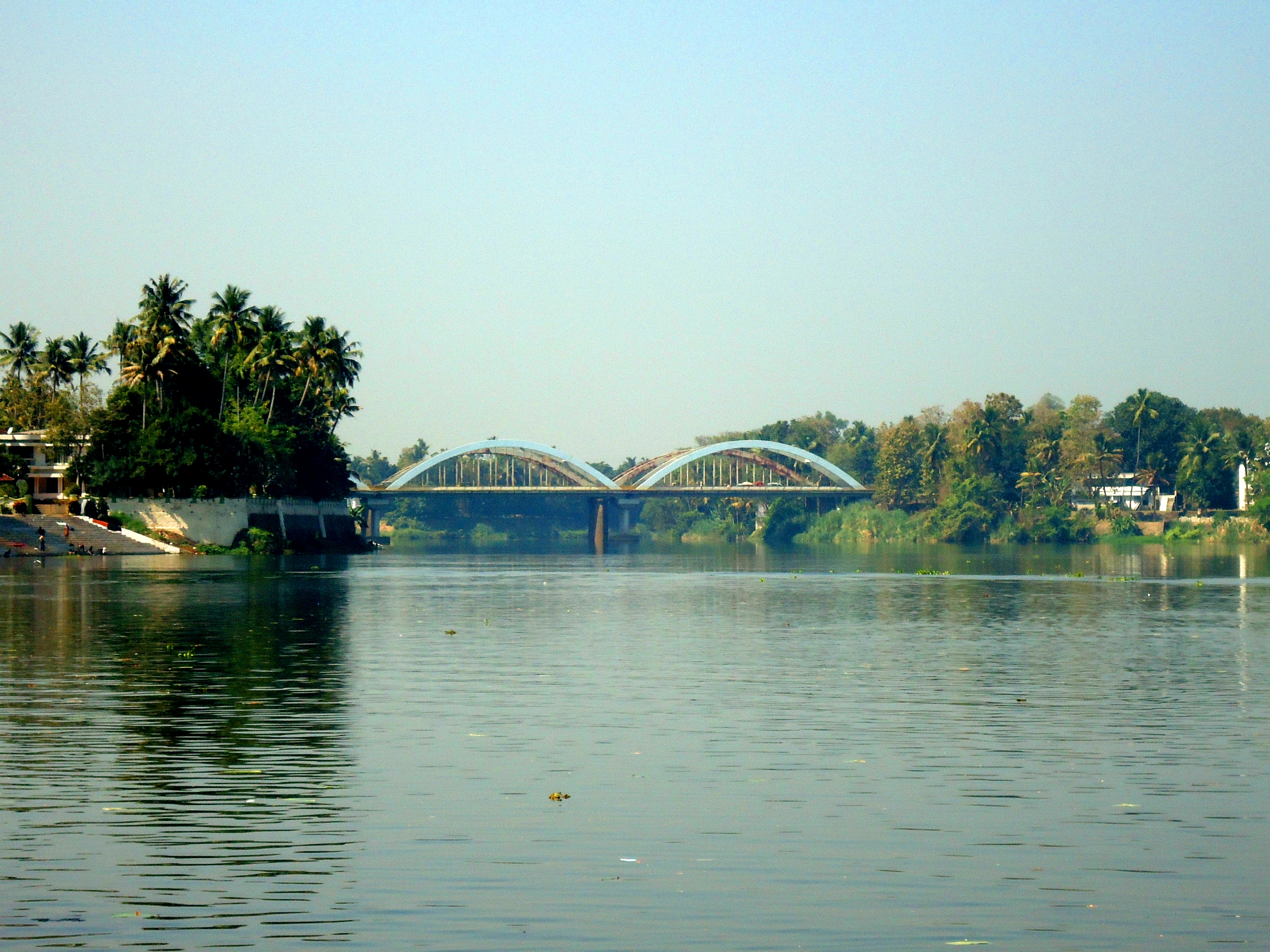
View of Bridge from Aluva Manappuram

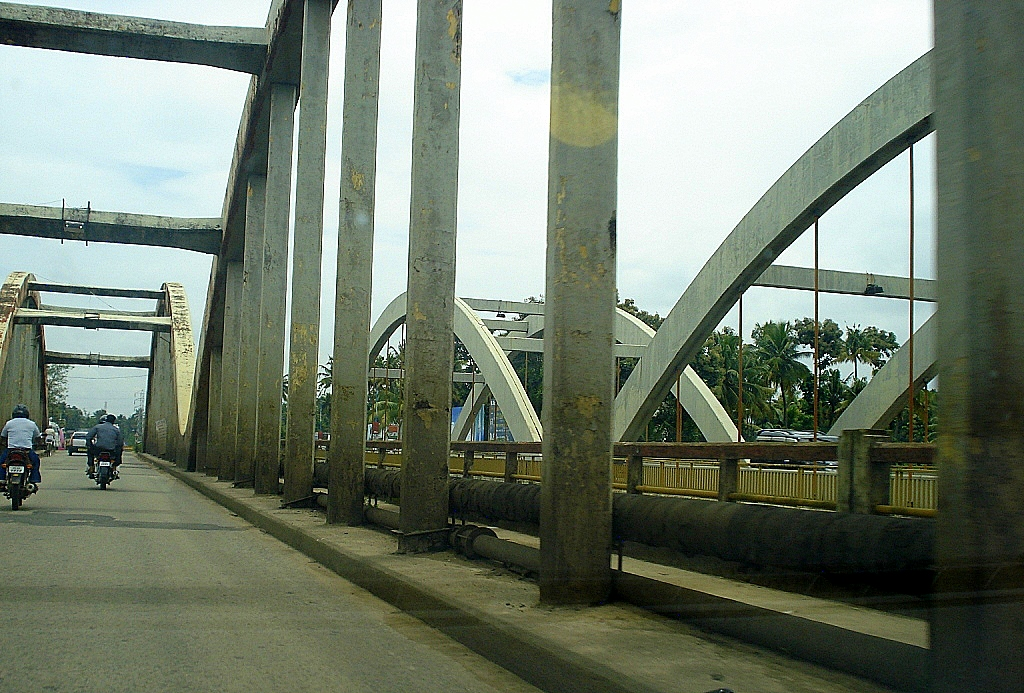
Inside of the Bridge

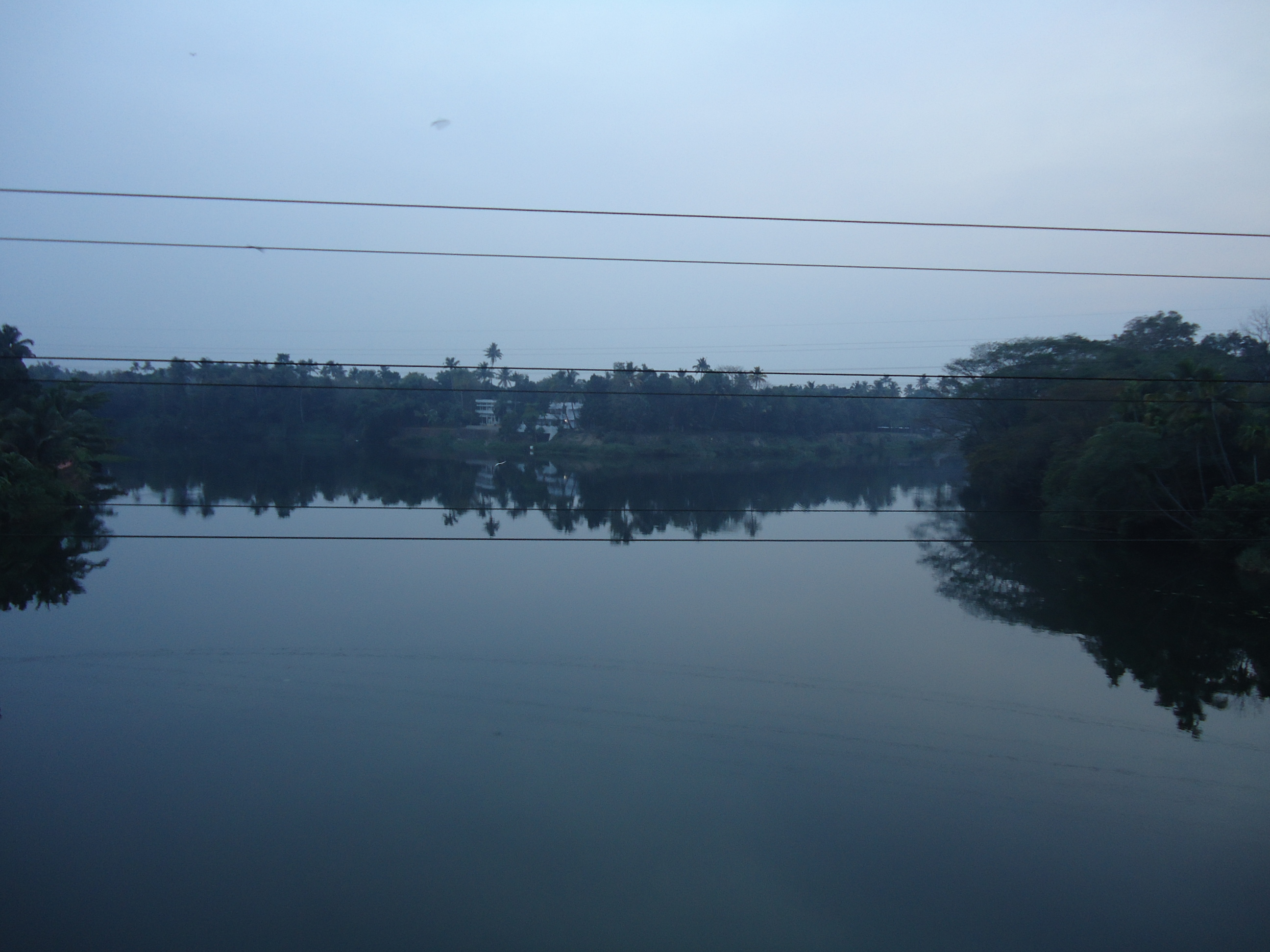
View of Periyar River from the bridge

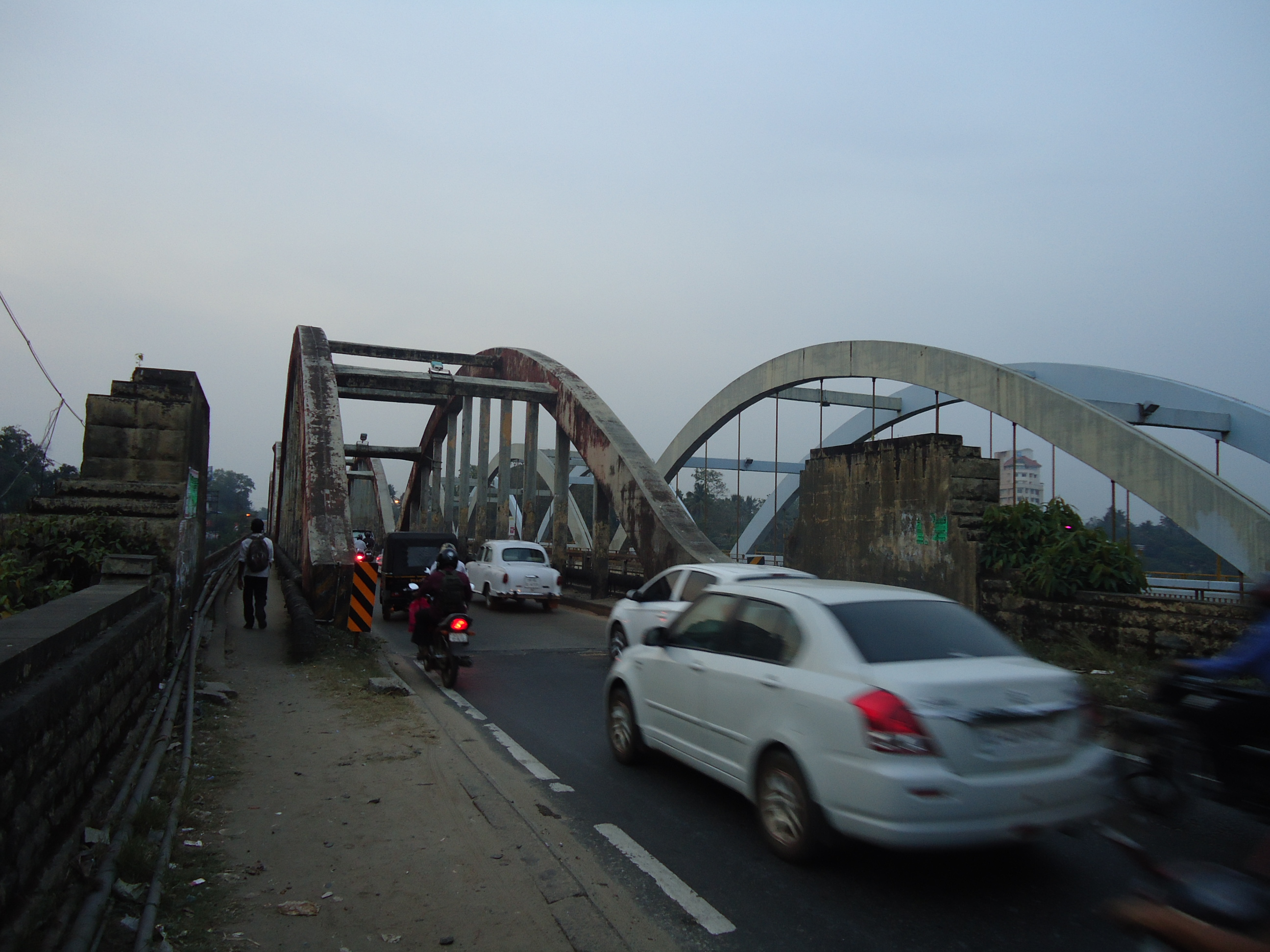
View from old bridge entrance

== See also ==
- Aluva
- Mangalapuzha bridge
- Neriamangalam Bridge
