= Muthuvan =

The Muthuvans (also known as Muduvar, Muduvan, and Muthuvan) are two tribes of forest dwelling cultivators located in the Anaimalai hills in Kerala and Tamil Nadu in south India. There are approximately 23,746 speakers of the Muthuvan language.

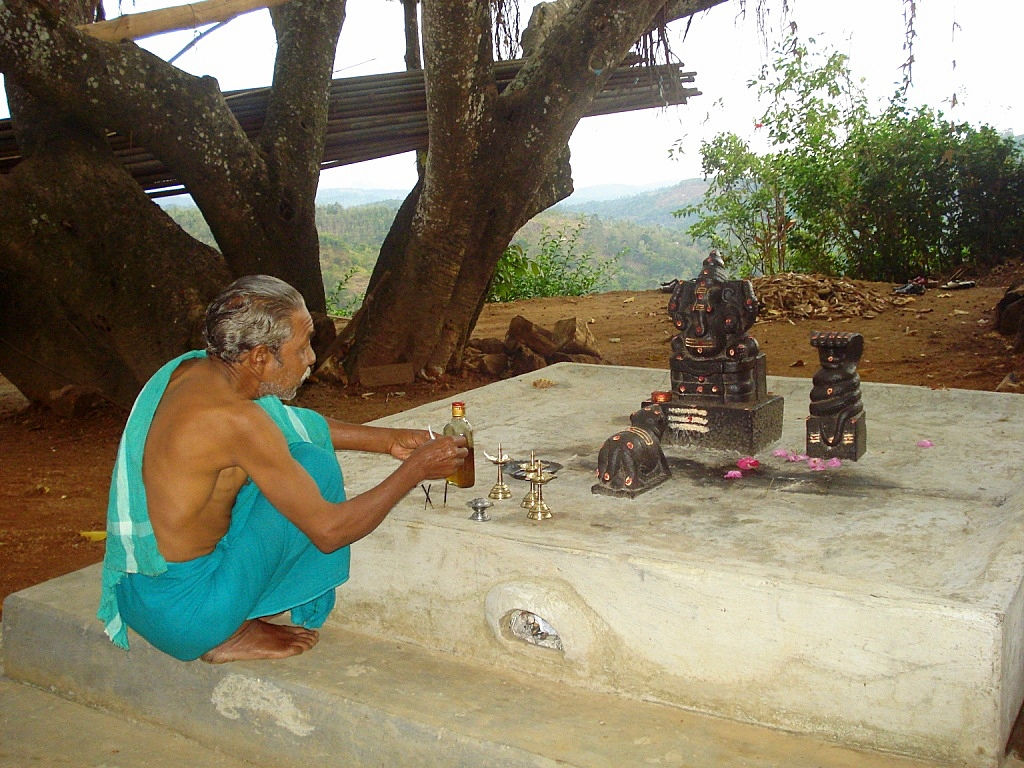
A Muthuvan leader doing rituals to a deity.

== Name ==
Muthuvan is the singular form, while Muthuvar is the plural form. Muthuku means "back". According to tribal legend, when the Muthuvans migrated from Madurai, they carried their children, belongings, and their dethroned king on their backs (rather than carrying belonging on their heads), and were given the name Muthuvans by the king.

== Language ==
There are two different groups which speak slightly different dialects, Malyalam Muthuvan and Pandi Muthuvan.

== Society ==
Villages, known as Kudis, consist of 30 or more related families. Housing consists of reed huts thatched with leaves, and occasionally mudded tree branch panels, split into a kitchen and a common room. Foods eaten are mostly ragi, rice, tapioca, birds, and lizards, along with honey, spices, and some wildflowers. Some Muthuvans cultivate rice, ragi, and bananas, as well as grow ginger, pepper, cardamom, betel nuts, and lemongrass as cash crops. Law and governance are handled by a group of elders, who elect a headman, called the Kani (or Kanikkar). Health care consists of traditional herbal medicines. Religion consists of animism and spirit worship, though Hinduism is also known. The literacy rate amongst women is low. Descent uses a matrilineal system, and at one time Western Muthuvans did not intermarry with Eastern Muthuvans.

== See also ==
- Edamalakkudy
- Muthuvan language
