= Pooyamkutty =

- village
- Location in Kerala, India Pooyamkutty (India)
- Coordinates: 10°9′39.79″N 76°47′11.94″E
- Country: India
- State: Kerala
- District: Ernakulam

Population (2001)
  - Total: 2,545

Languages
  - Official: Malayalam, English
- Time zone: UTC+5:30 (IST)

Pooyamkutty is a small town in Ernakulam district, Kothamangalam Taluk, Kuttampuzha panchayat and in the Indian state of Kerala. Pooyamkutty is situated along Pooyamkutty river, a tributary of the Periyar. The nearest Municipality is Kothamangalam which is 27 km away from Pooyamkutty and takes about one hour travelling time by road. It is very close to the Eravikulam National Park, despite being inaccessible in the short route by road.

Pooyamkutty is known for a hydroelectric project by KSEB. The project was designed to build a hydroelectric power station at Peendimedu waterfall, 8 kilometres deep inside the forest from Pooyamkutty. It was started in the 1980s and abandoned in 1990s. The project was initially designed to make an installed capacity of 1000MW, similar to Idukki dam, then changed to 210MW and subsequently abandoned due to environmental and financial issues by the government of India.

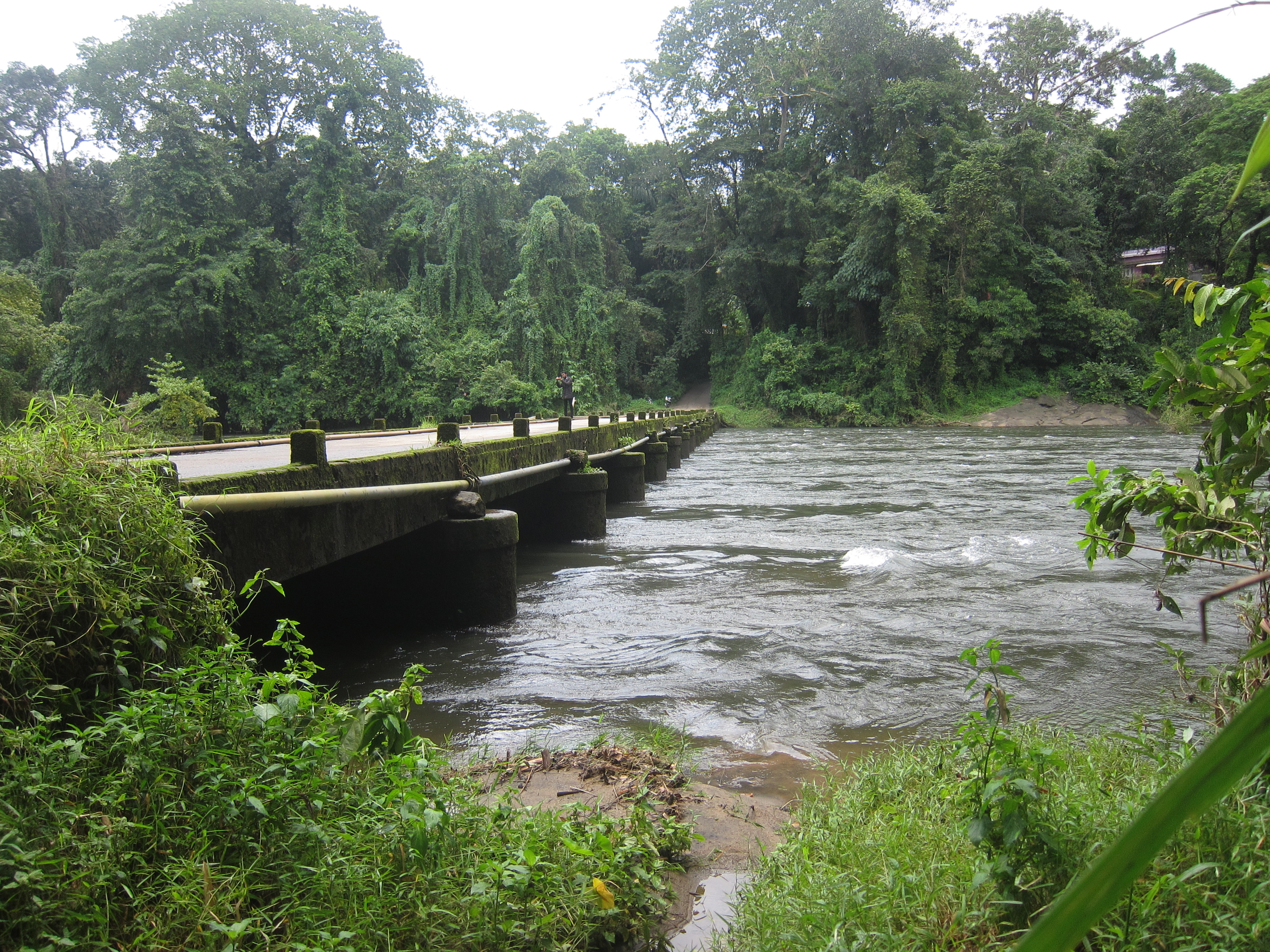
Pooyamkutty Bridge in 2017

Private buses are used as the first medium of transportation from the nearest town Kothamangalam which pass through Pooyamkutty and lead to Manikandamchal followed by Vellaramkuthu. Manikandamchal is fully occupied by farmers and Vellaramkuthu is by 'Adivasi' people. Manikandamchal bridge connects Pooyamkutty to Manikandamchal which was built in 2002, considered as a great addition by farmers staying in Manikandamchal, Vellaramkuthu and Kallelumedu. This is the one and only possible way to access the nearest town.

Many of the locations used in the Mohanlal movies Pulimurugan and Shikkar are filmed at Pooyamkutty.

== See also ==
- Kuttampuzha
- Kothamangalam
