= Rajamala =

Hill station near Munnar, Kerala, India

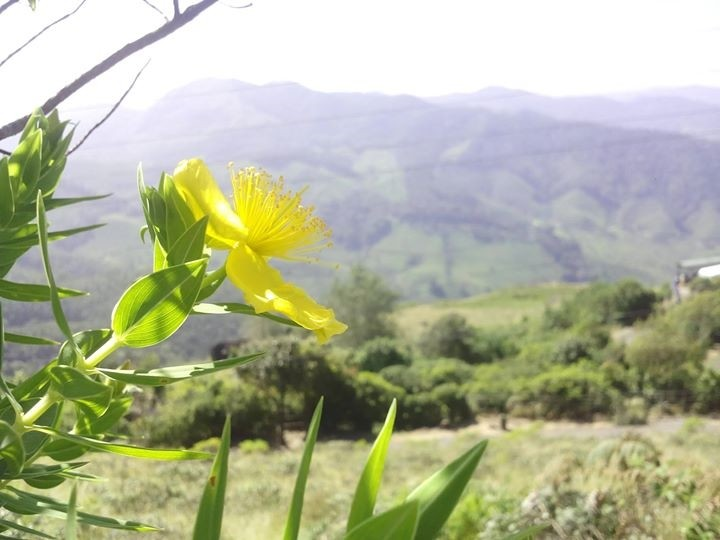
A view from Rajamala hill

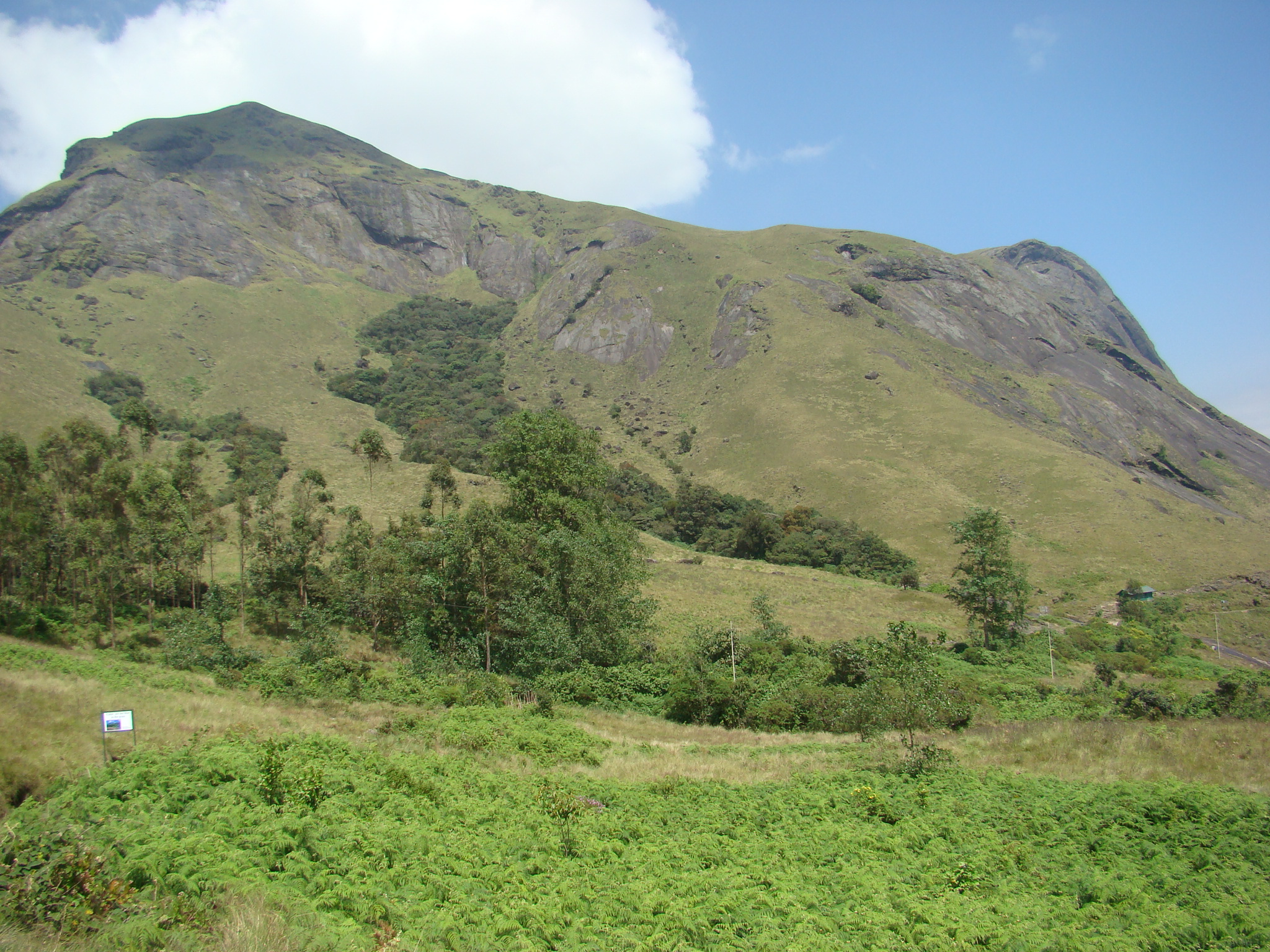
A view of Anamudi from Rajamala

Rajamala is a hill station in Eravikulam National park located about 15 kilometers from Munnar, Kerala, India. It is 2000 meters above sea level.
