= Kuttampuzha =

- village
- Location in Kerala, India Kuttampuzha (India)
- Coordinates: 10°9′0″N 76°44′0″E
- Country: India
- State: Kerala
- District: Ernakulam
- Taluk: Kothamangalam

Government
  - Type: Panchayati Raj (India)
  - Body: Kuttampuzha Grama Panchayat

Area
  - Total: 448.05 km^{2} (172.99 sq mi)
  - Rank: 1st

Population (2011)
  - Total: 24,799
  - Density: 55.349/km^{2} (143.35/sq mi)

Languages
  - Official: Malayalam, English
- Time zone: UTC+5:30 (IST)
- Vehicle registration: KL-44

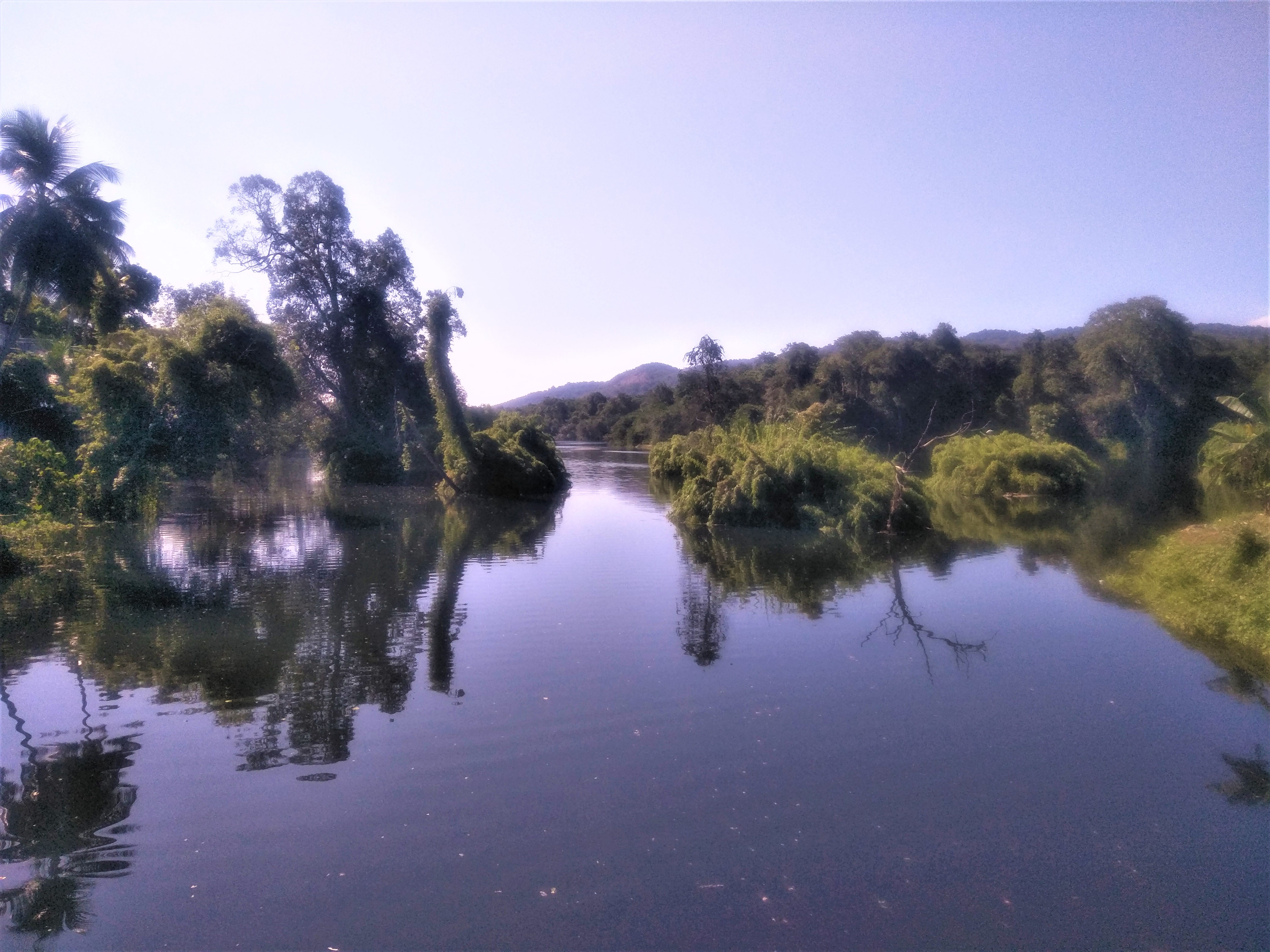
Kuttampuzha, a tributary of the Periyar river.

Kuttampuzha is a village and gram panchayat in Idukki district in the Indian state of Kerala. Situated 71 km east of Kochi, Kuttampuzha panchayat is home to the 17.7% of total area of the Ernakulam District.

The village has a large area under thick forest. There is a significant tribal population in the village (17.2% of total population).

This village was part of Idukki district until 1998. Then the district borders were reorganised and the village was shifted to Ernakulam district. Following this, Palakkad became the largest district in Kerala, followed by Idukki. This change also helped Ernakulam to share a boundary with the neighbouring state of Tamil Nadu and to be a part of the Anamalais. In 2010, the formation of Edamalakkudy panchayat led to the split of Kuttampuzha panchayat.

== Demographics ==
As of 2011 Census, Kuttampuzha village had a population of 24,799 with 12,554 males and 12,245 females. Kuttampuzha village spreads over an area of 448.05 km^{2} (172.99 sq mi) with 6,487 families residing in it. 10.3% of the population was under 6 years of age. Kuttampuzha had an average literacy of 89.4% higher than the national average of 74% and lower than state average of 94%: male literacy was 92% and female literacy was 86.7%.
