= Aanakkulam =

- place
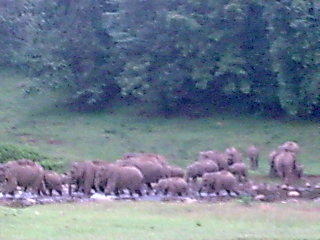
- Elephants at Aanakkulam

- Location in Kerala, India Aanakkulam (India)
- Coordinates: 10°10′24.4″N 76°55′37.1″E
- Country: India
- State: Kerala
- District: Idukki

Languages
  - Official: Malayalam, English
- Time zone: UTC+5:30 (IST)

Aanakkulam is a tourist place in Idukki district of Kerala state, India. Aanakkulam is in Mankulam Village, about 40 km away from Adimali. Aanakkulam means Pond of Elephants in local malayalam language.

Elephants comes to this particular place for drinking water as the water here has some kind of tastes which attracts them. Although there are many such water outlets throughout in that area, elephants come only to this place. It is 45 km from Kothamangalam.

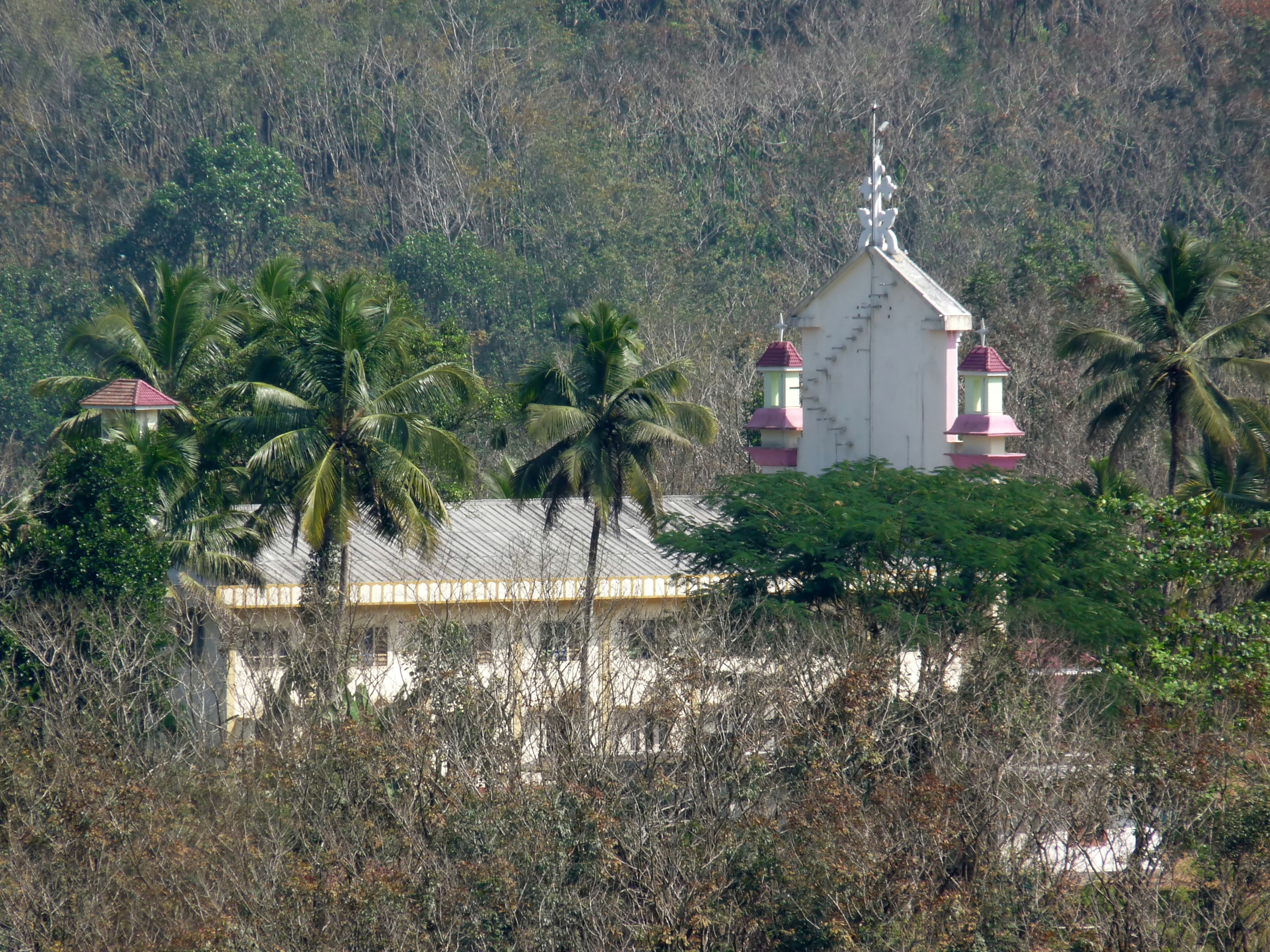
St. Joseph Church, Aanakkulam

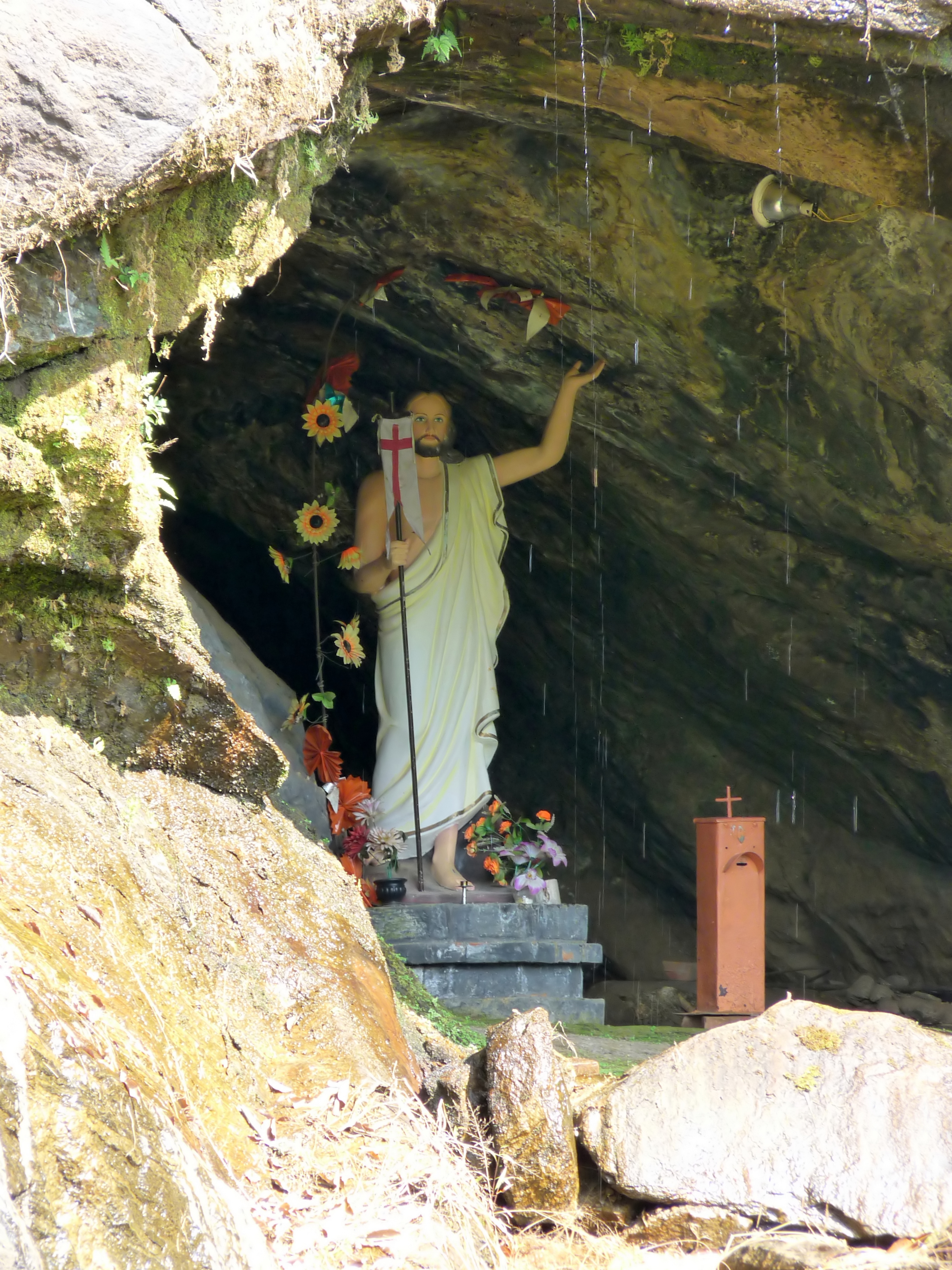
Grotto of St. Joseph Church, Aanakkulam

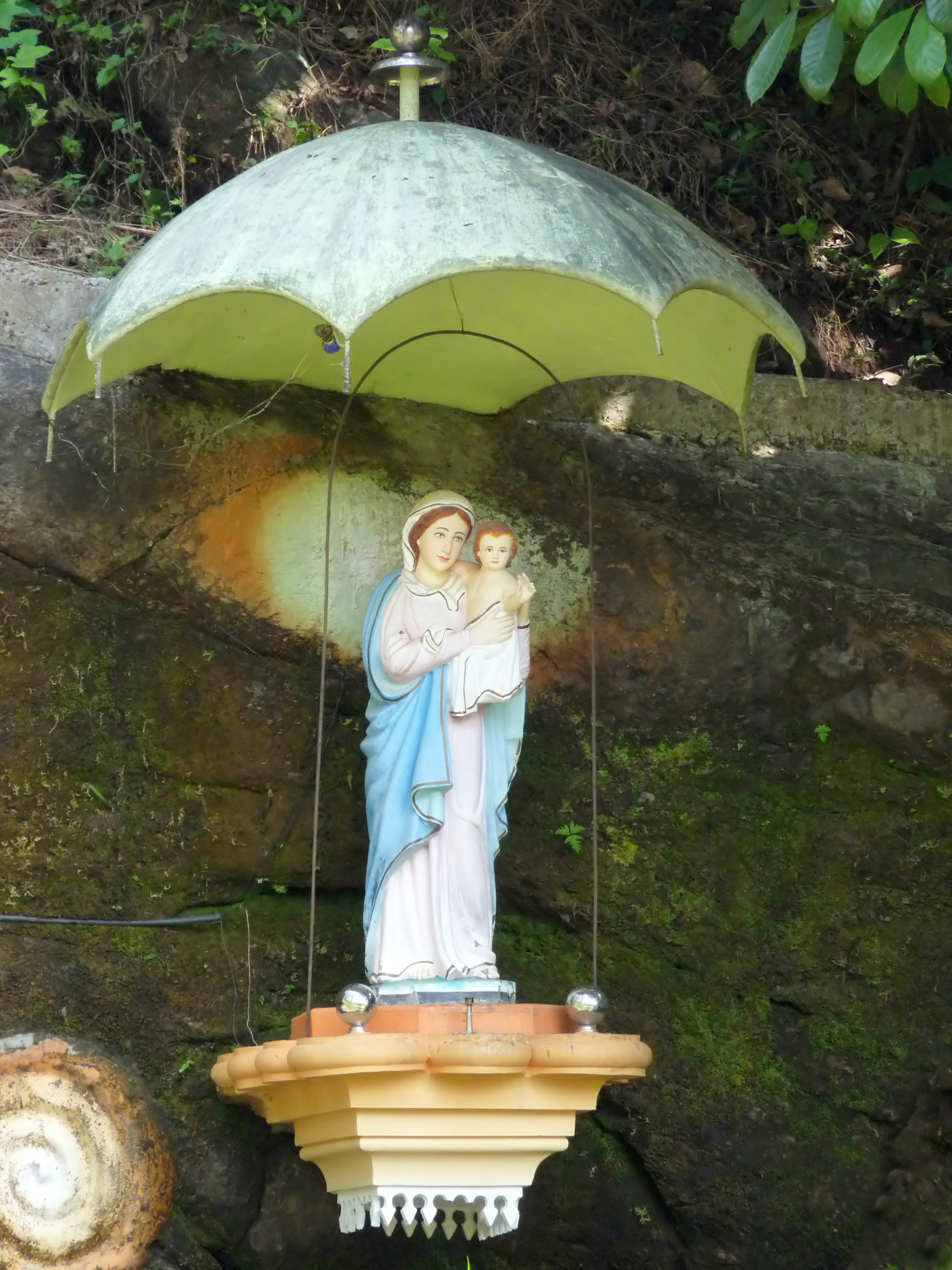
Grotto of St. Joseph Church, Aanakkulam
