= Mankulam, Idduki =

Mankulam
- village
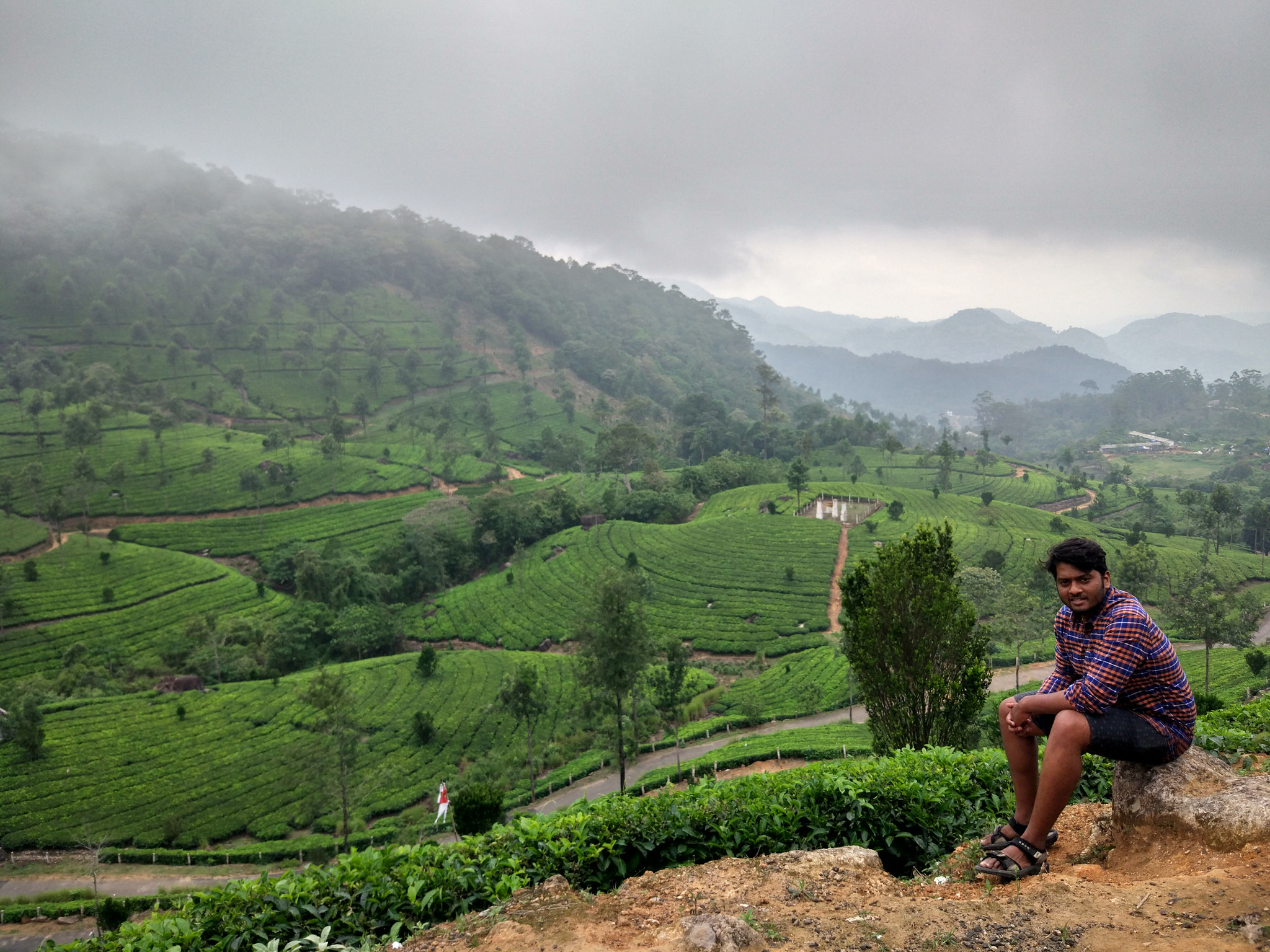
- Southern area of Mankulam

- Location in Kerala, India Mankulam (India)
- Coordinates: 10°7′12″N 76°55′41″E
- Country: India
- State: Kerala
- District: Idukki

Population (2011)
  - Total: 9,595

Languages
  - Official: Malayalam, English
  - Minority: Tamil
- Time zone: UTC+5:30 (IST)
- PIN: 685565

Mankulam is a village in Idukki district in the Indian state of Kerala. This is the first Grama Panchayat in Kerala which produces electricity on its own. It sells it to the Electricity board of Kerala.

== Demographics ==
As of 2011 India census, Mankulam had a population of 9595, with 4863 males and 4732 females.

== See also ==
- Aanakkulam
- Muppathi Moonu Waterfalls
