= Leptacanthus =

Leptacanthus can be one of these two genera:

- Leptacanthus Agassiz, 1837, a chimaeroid fossil fish genus
- Leptacanthus Nees, a synonym of the plant genus Strobilanthes.
