= Pteracanthus (beetle) =

Scientific classification
- Missing taxonomy template (fix): Pteracanthus

Genus of weevils

Pteracanthus is a genus of weevils. There are 2 species assigned to this genus, one of which is only provisionally accepted:

- Pteracanthus smidti Boheman, C.H. in Schönherr, C.J., 1843 (provisionally accepted)
- Pteracanthus smidtii (Fabricius, J.C., 1802)
