= List of plants known as ivy =

The term ivy usually refers to plant species in the genus Hedera, in the family Araliaceae, and most commonly Hedera helix (common ivy, English ivy or European ivy).

Ivy may also refer to other plant species (family names in parentheses):

- Boston ivy Parthenocissus tricuspidata (Vitaceae)
- cape ivy Senecio angulatus and Senecio tamoides (Asteraceae)
- coliseum ivy, Kenilworth ivy, Oxford ivy, Cymbalaria muralis (Plantaginaceae)
- devil's ivy Epipremnum aureum (Araceae)
- fig ivy (or creeping fig or climbing fig) Ficus pumila (Moraceae)
- German ivy (or parlor ivy) Delairea odorata (Asteraceae)
- grape ivy Parthenocissus tricuspidata (Vitaceae)
- ground ivy Glechoma hederacea (Lamiaceae)
- ivy of Uruguay Cissus striata (Vitaceae)
- ivy tree Heptapleurum heptaphyllum (Araliaceae)
- Japanese ivy Parthenocissus tricuspidata (Vitaceae)
- Natal ivy (or wax ivy) Senecio macroglossus (Asteraceae)
- poison ivy Toxicodendron radicans (Anacardiaceae)
- purple ivy Rhododendron catawbiense (Ericaceae)
- red flame ivy Hemigraphis alternata (Acanthaceae)
- Swedish ivy Plectranthus verticillatus (Lamiaceae)
- switch ivy Leucothoe fontanesiana (Ericaceae)
