= Cơm nếp =

Cơm nếp is a Vietnamese term that refers to:

- Strobilanthes tonkinensis, a plant also called chuỳ hoa bắc bộ in Vietnamese
- A Vietnamese dish involving flavored glutinous rice
