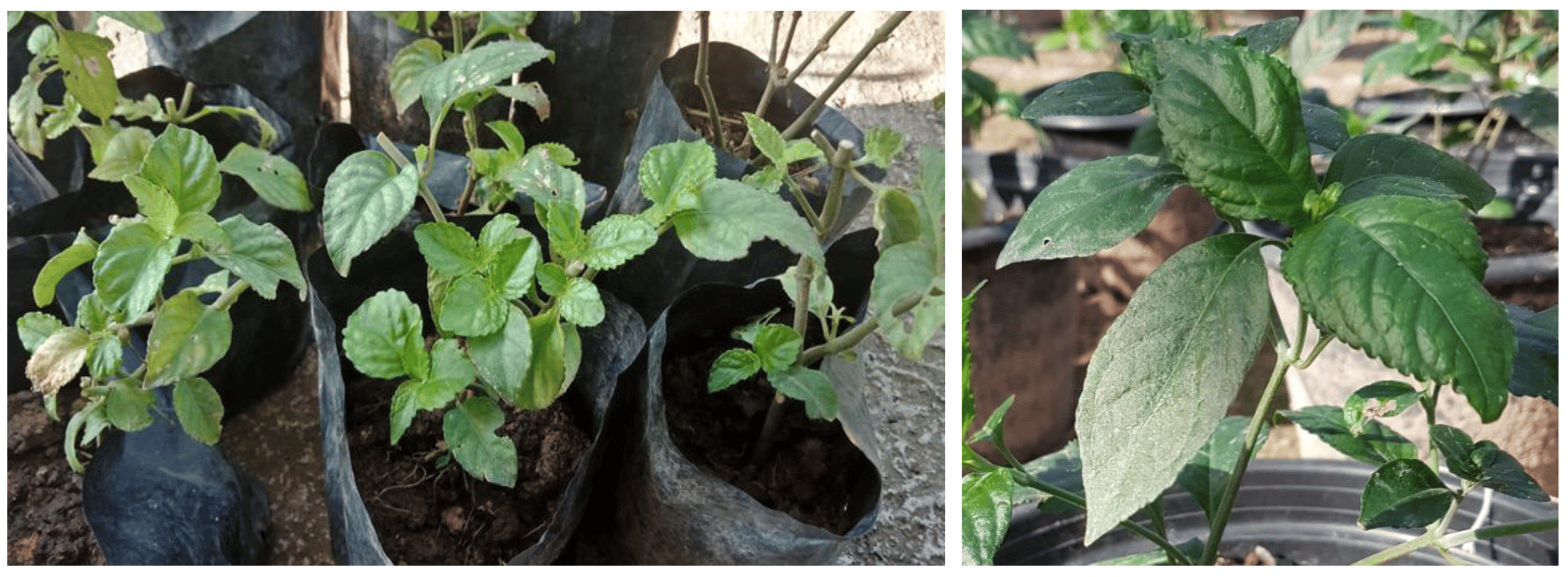
- Seedlings of S. tonkinensis

Scientific classification
- Kingdom: Plantae
- Clade: Tracheophytes
- Clade: Angiosperms
- Clade: Eudicots
- Clade: Asterids
- Order: Lamiales
- Family: Acanthaceae
- Genus: Strobilanthes
- Species: S. tonkinensis

Binomial name
- Strobilanthes tonkinensis Lindau 1897

Varieties
- Strobilanthes tonkinensis var. sarmentosus Benoist, 1935; Strobilanthes tonkinensis var. tonkinensis
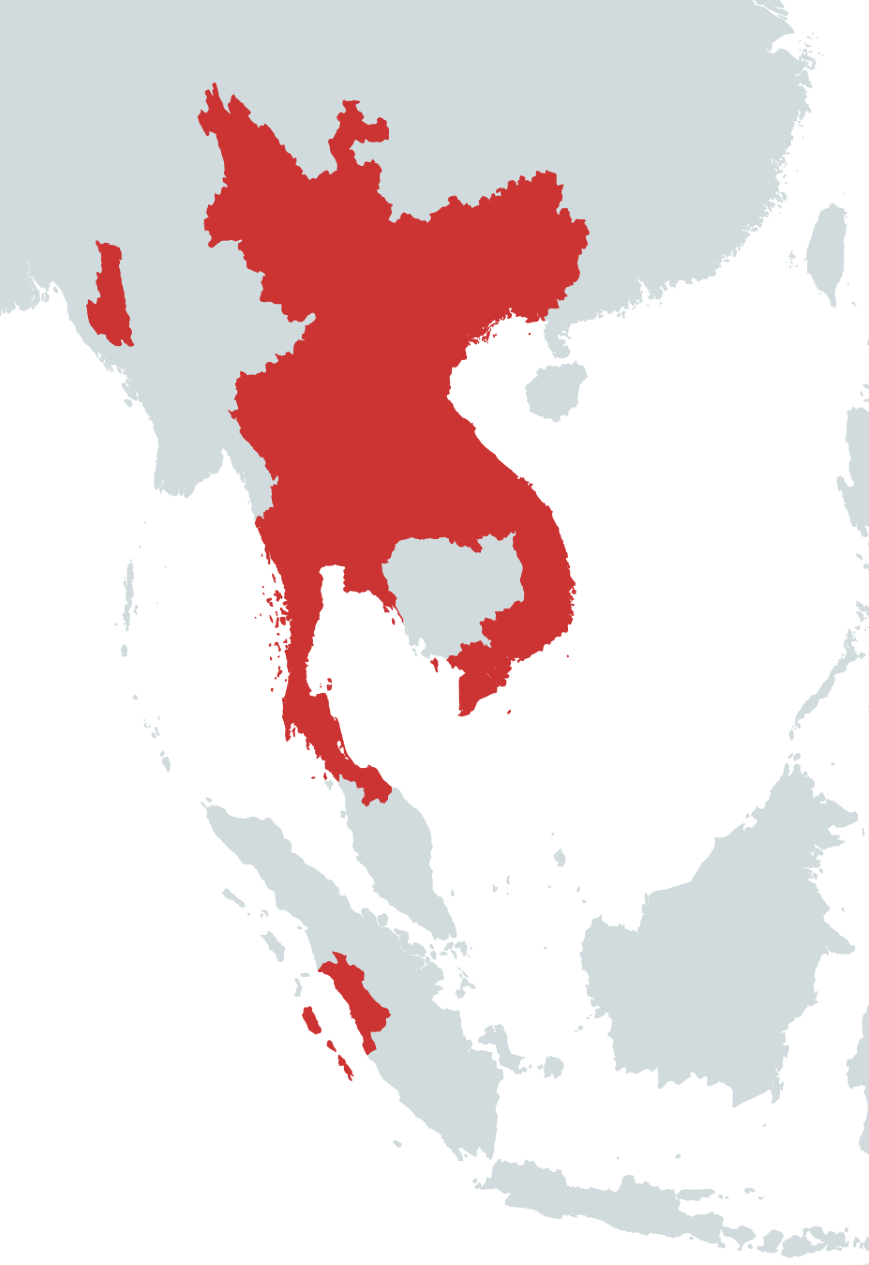
- Countries and territories where S. tonkinensis is found

Synonyms
- Strobilanthes nivea Craib 1914; Sympagis nivea (Craib) Bremek. 1944; Semnostachya menglaensis H.P.Tsui 2002 nom. inval.

= Strobilanthes tonkinensis =

Species of herbaceous plant

Sticky rice herb (dry)
Nutritional value per 100 g
- Carbohydrates
- Dietary fibre: 11.3 g
- Fat: 5.2 g
- Protein: 21.8 g
Amino acids
Threonine	0.67 g
Isoleucine	0.66 g
Leucine	1.26 g
Lysine	0.83 g
Cystine	0.05 g
Phenylalanine	0.89 g
Tyrosine	0.49 g
Valine	0.82 g
Arginine	0.73 g
Histidine	0.34 g
Alanine	1.00 g
Aspartic acid	1.50 g
Glutamic acid	1.37 g
Glycine	1.02 g
Serine	0.66 g
Vitamins and minerals
Minerals	Quantity %DV^{†}
Calcium	178% 2314 mg
Copper	13244% 119.2 mg
Iron	4397% 791.5 mg
Magnesium	202% 849 mg
Manganese	131487% 3024.2 mg
Phosphorus	14% 174 mg
Potassium	70% 2110 mg
Zinc	18283% 2011.1 mg
- Other constituents: Quantity
- Water: 63%
- ^{†}Percentages estimated using US recommendations for adults, except for potassium, which is estimated based on expert recommendation from the National Academies.

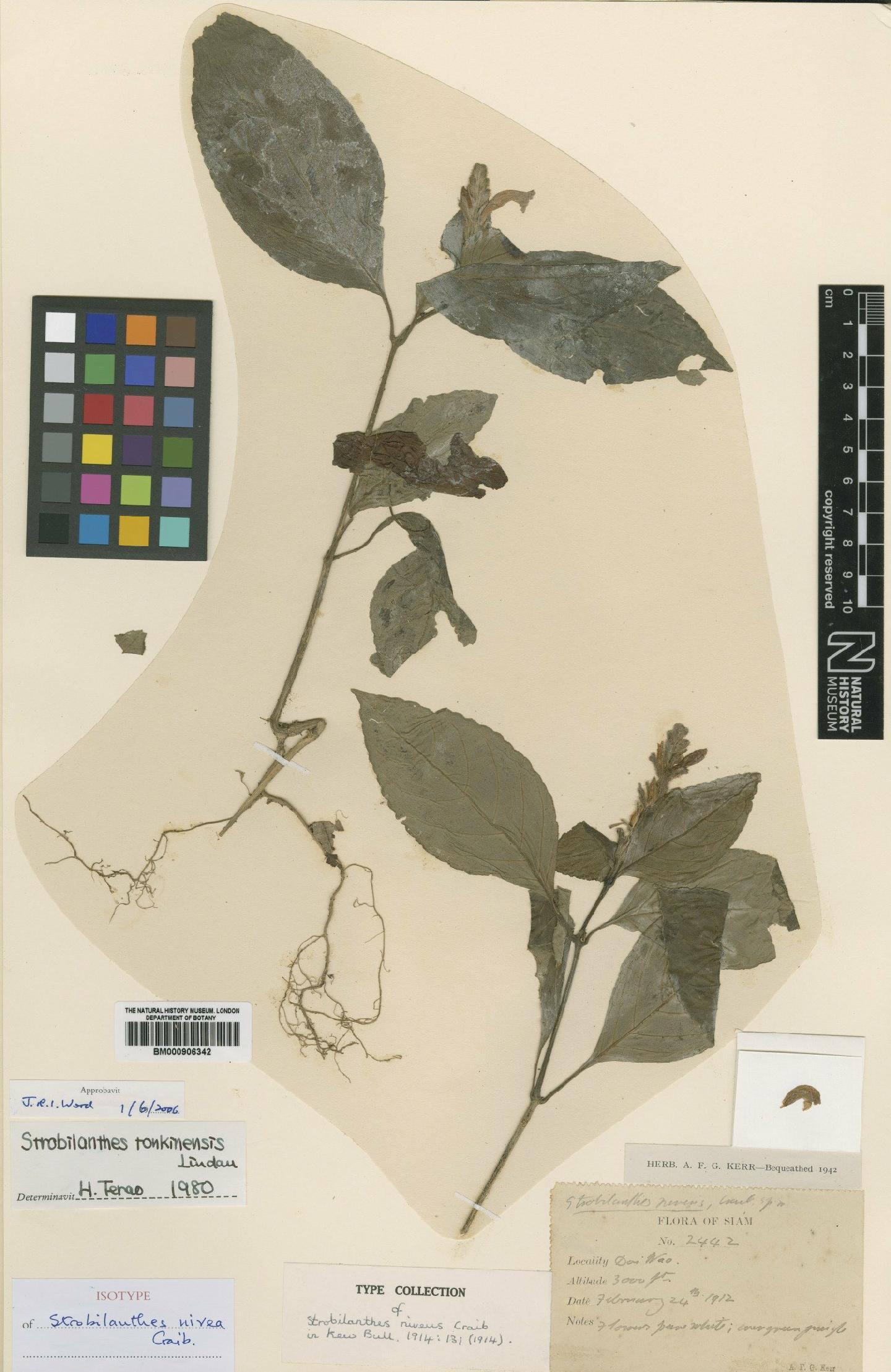
S. tonkinensis type specimen

Strobilanthes tonkinensis is a species of herbaceous plant native to Southeast Asia. It is used as a flavoring for tea and other food.

== Names ==
Many sources still refer to the plant by the synonym Semnostachya menglaensis, but this name is not a validly published name as that herbarium where the type specimen is located was not specified.

The genus name Strobilanthes can be broken down into στροβιλοϛ (strobilus) meaning 'pine cone', and ανϑοϛ (anthos) meaning 'flower'. The specific epithet tonkinensis refers to the type locality of Tonkin (Northern Vietnam). The epithet nivea derives from the latin niveum meaning 'snow white', perhaps referring to the white flowers. The epithet menglaensis refers to Mengla County in China.

In Chinese it is called 糯米香 (nuò mǐ xiāng "glutinous rice fragrance"), because it smells and tastes like sticky rice. In Thai, it is called เนียมหอม (niamhom). The Vietnamese names for the plant include chuỳ hoa bắc bộ and cơm nếp. Chuỳ hoa refers to members of Strobilanthes as a whole, and Bắc Bộ refers to Northern Vietnam. The sarmentosus variety is called chuỳ hoa bắc bộ có lỏng. Khmu language speakers in Laos call it pl̀tàap.

== Uses ==
The aroma evokes sticky rice, but has also been compared to pandan. Dried leaves of S. tonkinensis are used to flavor black tea and pu'er tea to impart its fragrance and sticky rice flavor. The use of the leaves in tea has a long tradition among the Dai people. It can also be used as a flavoring for jiuqu, cookies, ice cream, and dim sum. The herb can also be mixed with slaked lime for betel nut chewing or added to tobacco to make those strong flavors more palatable.

Outside of food or drink, the leaves can be used to give laundry a fresh scent.

== Taxonomy ==
Genomic information
- NCBI ID: 2792840
- Sequenced organelle: chloroplast genome
- Organelle size: 0.144765
- Year of completion: 2021

S. tonkinensis appears related to S. maculatus, but has much larger flowers, leaves, and bracts; as well as having denser trichomes. S. spathulatibracteata also is morphologically similar.

S. tonkinensis was briefly in the Strobilanthes subgenus Sympagis. The subgenus was subsequently elevated to genus status, before being determined to be a synonym of Strobilanthes, which now has no subgenera.

The variety Strobilanthes tonkinensis var. sarmentosus is so named because it has sarmentose (long and slender) branches.

When the chloroplast genome was sequenced, it was compared to other species within Acanthaceae and the below maximum likelihood phylogenetic tree was produced. The numbers on the nodes are the bootstrap values.

- - - - 100
        - - 100
            - - 100
                - - 100
                    - 100
                      - 100
                        - - Strobilanthes batonensis
                          - Strobilanthes cusia
                      - Strobilanthes tonkinensis
                    - Echinacanthus attenuatus
                  - 100
                    - 100
                      - - Echinacanthus lofouensis
                        - Echinacanthus longipes
                    - Echinacanthus longzhouensis
              - 100
                - - 100
                    - - 100
                        - - 100
                            - - 100
                                - - 67
                                    - - 55
                                        - - 46
                                            - - Dicliptera acuminata
                                              - Dicliptera peruviana
                                          - Dictiptera montana
                                      - Dicliptera ruiziana
                                  - Dicliptera mucronata
                              - Justicia flava
                          - Justicia adhatoda
                      - 100
                        - Justicia leptostachya
                        - Rungia pectinata
                  - Clinacanthus nutans
          - 100
            - Andrographis paniculata
            - Barleria prionitis
      - 100
        - - 100
            - - 100
                - - 100
                    - Acanthus ilicifolius
                    - Acanthus ebracteatus
                  - Blepharis ciliaris
              - Aphelandra knappiae
          - Avicennia marina
  - Ginkgo biloba

== Description ==
The plant is herbaceous with a woody base and shrubby, roughly four-sided, pubescent branches. When dry the plant is fragrant.

The leaves are ~23×12 cm or a little smaller and egg-shaped, starting wide and narrowing quickly to the acuminate apex (tip). The margins are nearly entire, with irregular sinuous 'teeth'. The leaf epidermal cells are hexagonal with straight cell walls. The leaf stomata are hypostomatic (on the abaxial side) and solely diacytic. The non-glandular leaf trichomes tend to be simple, composed of two cells, and cone-shaped. The leaf petioles are 3–4 cm long. Adaxially there are prominent striated cystoliths with a point on one end.

S. tonkinensis has white flowers that are opposite, arising from pedunculate, tomentose spikelets in the upper axils. The flowers are in lax, terminal spikes similar to Strobilanthes collina. The bracts are 10×3 mm, slightly spathulate, obtuse, and densely tomentose. Bracteoles are 6×1 mm in size, lanceolate, obtuse, and densely tomentose. The calyx is also obtuse and tomentose, and about 8.5×1.4 mm. The corolla lobes are short and 6 × 6 mm with a subacute and sinuate apex. The stamen filaments are hairy and laterally bifurcated at the base with a pubescent line running down. Anthers are 3.5 mm long. The pollen grains are 85×60 μm. The stylus is 20 mm long and glabrous with a 3 mm stigma.

The capsule is 15 mm long and 4 mm wide, with a compressed base and acute apex. It's minutely glandular-pubescentand contains four glabrous seeds. The glabrous seed is unusual among Strobilanthes of East Asia. The seeds have no trichomes on their areoles, only annular thickenings.

== Distribution ==
The plant can typically be found in tropical and subtropical moist broadleaf forests at 200–1500 m in elevation in Vietnam, Thailand, China (Yunnan and Guangxi), Laos, Indonesia (Sumatra), and Myanmar (Chin State and Tanintharyi Region).

S. tonkinensis cannot grow in direct sunlight, nor in conditions that are too shaded or moist.

The type was found by Benjamin Balansa in Tonkin (Northern Vietnam) in the forests of the Ba Vì mountain range at 400 m in elevation.

== Biochemistry ==
Dried S. tonkinensis leaves contains abundant minerals and trace elements, particularly high levels of calcium, potassium, magnesium, and phosphorus. Additionally, it contains essential trace elements such as iron, copper, manganese, and zinc, which are necessary for human health. The plant is rich in nutrients such as crude protein, crude fiber, and amino acids, with a high content of essential amino acids that meets the Food and Agriculture Organization and World Health Organization's recommended ratio.

The volatile molecules the contribute to the aroma include α-ionone, trans-β-ionone, linalool oxide (pyranoid), isophorone, formic acid dodecyl ester, acetophenone, 6-methyl-pentadecane, 4-chloro-2-methyl-1-phenyl-3-buten-1-ol, 3-octanol, 3-hexenyl ester, 3-carene, 3,6,6-trimethyl-bicyclo(3.1.1)hept-2-ene, 2-hydroxy-benzoic acid ethyl ester, 2-ethyl-1-hexanol, 1-phenyl-1,2-propanediol, 1-octen-3-ol, 1-nonanol, 1-dodecanol, 1,7,7-trimethyl-bicyclo(2.2.1)hept-2-ene, and (Z)-butanoic acid.

== Ecology ==
S. tonkinensis flowers from April–June and in December, and fruits in June and July.
