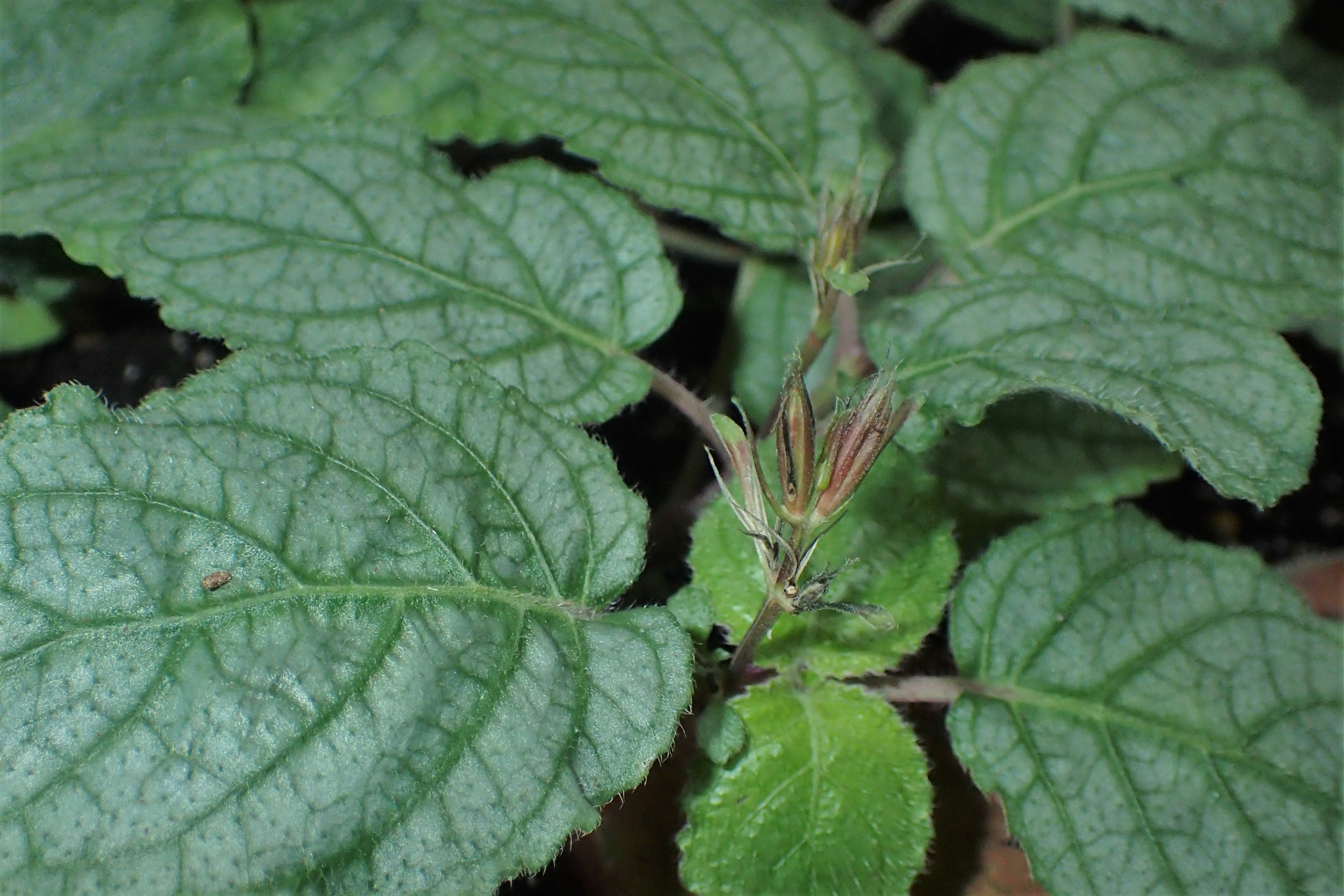

Scientific classification
- Kingdom: Plantae
- Clade: Tracheophytes
- Clade: Angiosperms
- Clade: Eudicots
- Clade: Asterids
- Order: Lamiales
- Family: Acanthaceae
- Genus: Strobilanthes
- Species: S. reptans

Binomial name
- Strobilanthes reptans G.Forst

= Strobilanthes reptans =

Species of plant

Strobilanthes reptans is a species of Strobilanthes native to Tropical and Subtropical Asia and the West Pacific, but also found in Florida and Louisiana after being introduced. It has at 35 synonyms mainly in the genus Hemigraphis with 28, another 5 in Ruellia plus Strobilanthes primulifolia and Strobilanthes tawadana. It has been described as an invasive weed around the Indo-Pacific islands region, with an ornamental appearance.

In 2019 it was recorded from Tipi in the West Kameng district of Arunachal Pradesh. It has not yet had any adverse effect on local flora and is restricted to one small single location. It was found on grassy hill slopes at a height of 150 meters above sea level, with the specimens being up to 20 cm tall. It has tubular flowers blooming from June to September, mainly white or pale violet with darker coloured veins. It was also found to fruit from around July until December.
