= Strobilanthes involucrata =

Scientific classification
- Kingdom: Plantae
- Clade: Tracheophytes
- Clade: Angiosperms
- Clade: Eudicots
- Clade: Asterids
- Order: Lamiales
- Family: Acanthaceae
- Subfamily: Acanthoideae
- Tribe: Ruellieae
- Genus: Strobilanthes
- Species: S. involucrata

Binomial name
- Strobilanthes involucrata (Bl.)

Synonyms
- Strobilanthes involucratus Bl. Pachystrobilus involucratus (Blume) Bremek. Strobilanthes erosa Nees

Species of flowering plant

Strobilanthes involucrata is a species of flowering plants in the family Acanthaceae and the tribe Ruellieae. It is found in south-east Asia: native to Java and introduced to Indo-China. This was previously considered a species of the monotypic genus Pachystrobilus.

The Catalogue of Life accepted this species under its orthographic variant S. involucratus, with a subspecies S. i. tjibodensis, but this is not included in Plants of the World Online.
