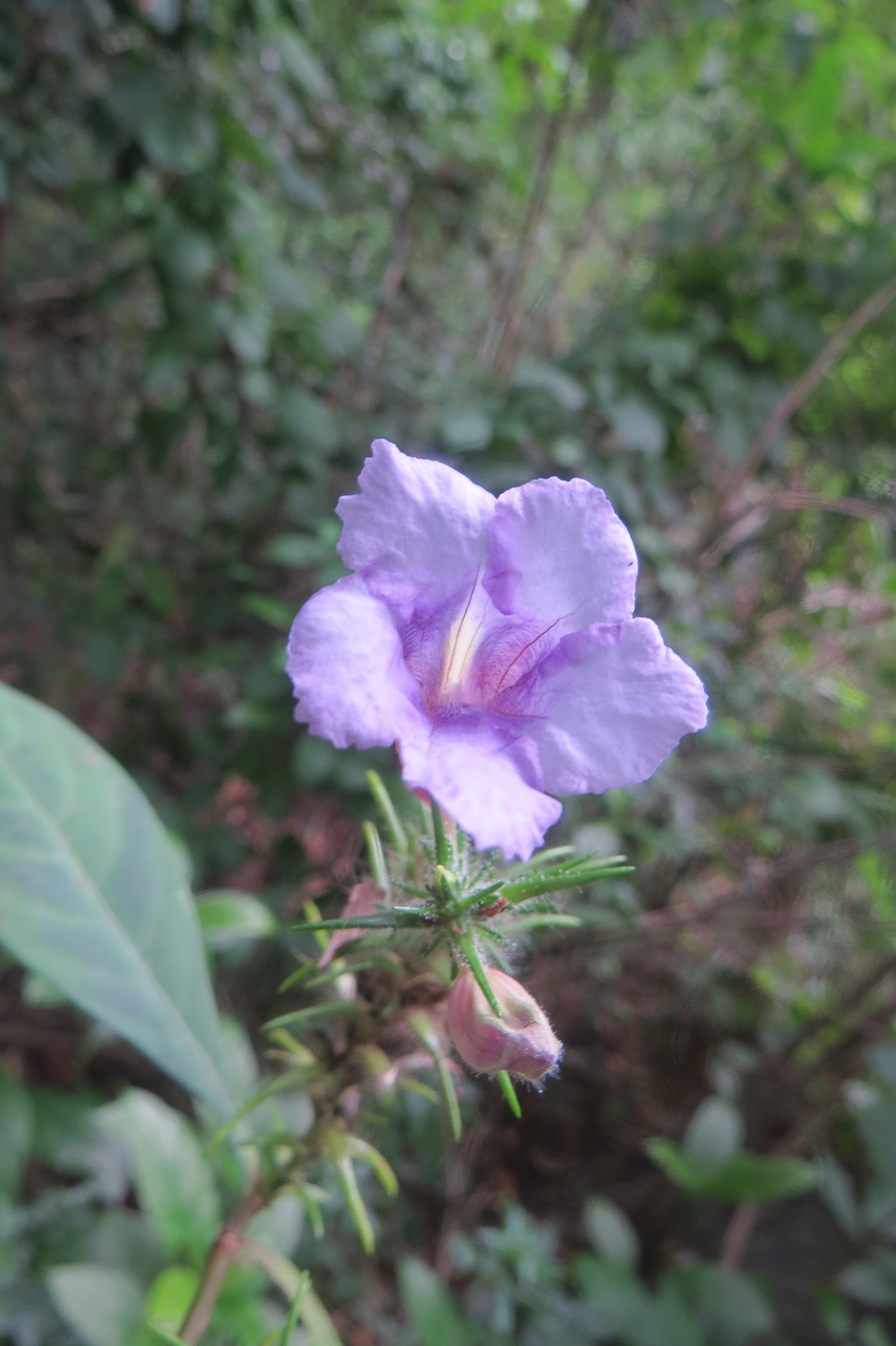

Scientific classification
- Kingdom: Plantae
- Clade: Tracheophytes
- Clade: Angiosperms
- Clade: Eudicots
- Clade: Asterids
- Order: Lamiales
- Family: Acanthaceae
- Genus: Strobilanthes
- Species: S. integrifolius

Binomial name
- Strobilanthes integrifolius (Dalz.) Kuntze

= Strobilanthes integrifolius =

Species of plant

Strobilanthes integrifolius is a species of plant in the family Acanthaceae. Commonly known as Thottukurinji, it is found in the Western Ghats in the South Indian regions of Kerala, Goa, Maharashtra and Karnataka. Especially the flower plant originally illustrated by Dalz., And was given the exact name of Carl Ernst Otto Kuntze the Strobilanthes integrifolius.

== Description ==
Strobilanthes integrifolius is a much branched shrub to 2 m (6 ft 7 in) high. The stems are terete and glabrous and the leaves are opposite. It bears blue to light violet flowers. The inflorescences are simple or compound spikes, interrupted, to 10 cm (3.9 in) long, and strong-smelling.
