= Strobilanthes wightiana =

Scientific classification
- Kingdom: Plantae
- Clade: Tracheophytes
- Clade: Angiosperms
- Clade: Eudicots
- Clade: Asterids
- Order: Lamiales
- Family: Acanthaceae
- Genus: Strobilanthes
- Species: S. wightiana

Binomial name
- Strobilanthes wightiana (Nees) Bremek.

Species of plant of the family Acanthaceae

Strobilanthes wightiana is a species of plant in the family Acanthaceae, commonly called Wight's kurinji. It is endemic to Southern Western Ghats. It prefers evergreen and semi-evergreen forests.

== Description ==
Wight's kurinji is a shrub with hairy branches. It bears a few pale blue flowers.
