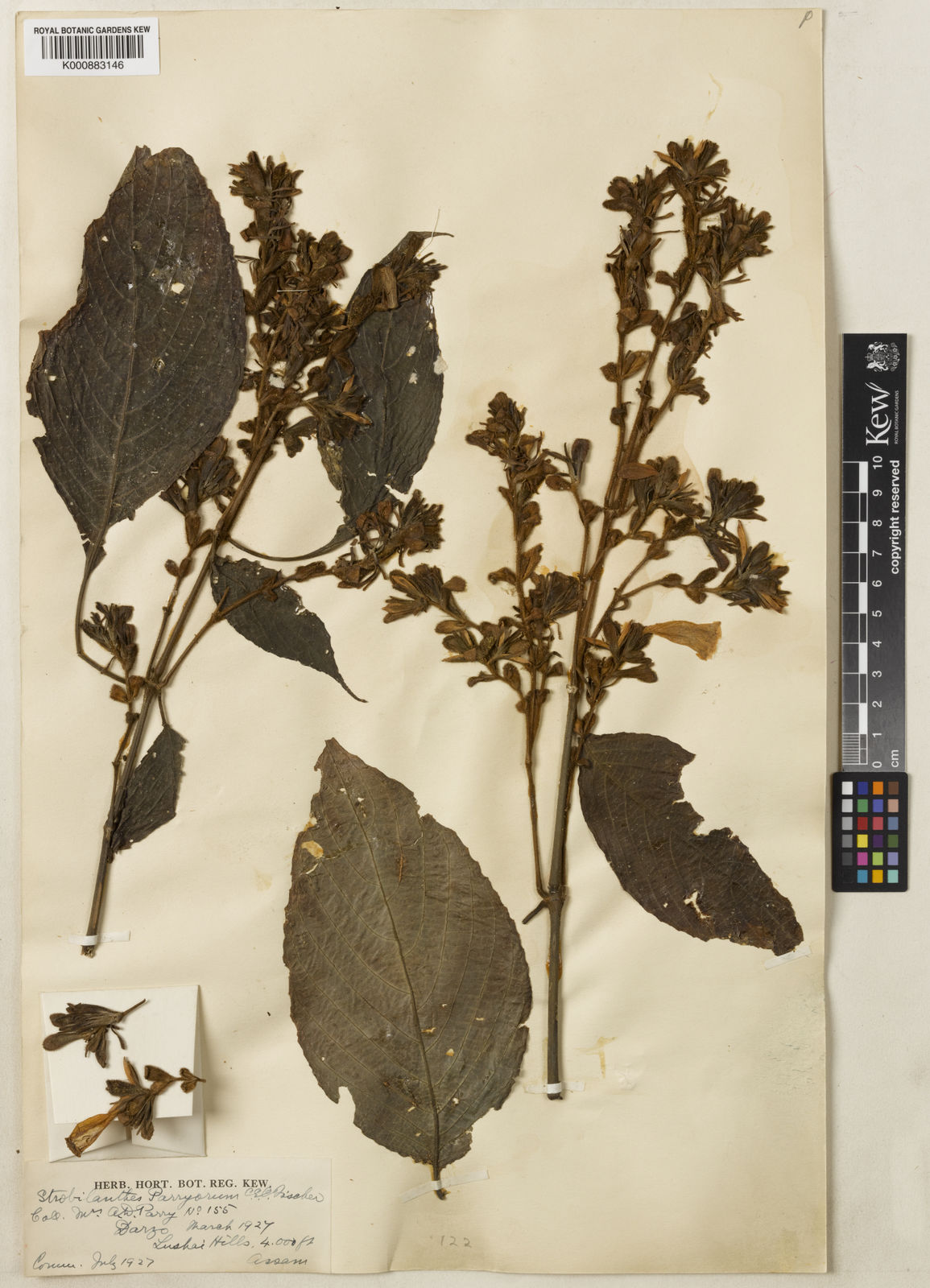
- Specimen collected by botanist Annie Dunnet Parry from Darzo village in the Lushai Hills in 1928

Scientific classification
- Kingdom: Plantae
- Clade: Tracheophytes
- Clade: Angiosperms
- Clade: Eudicots
- Clade: Asterids
- Order: Lamiales
- Family: Acanthaceae
- Genus: Strobilanthes
- Species: S. parryorum

Binomial name
- Strobilanthes parryorum C.E.C.Fisch

= Strobilanthes parryorum =

Species of plant

Strobilanthes parryorum is a flowering plant of Strobilanthes genus native to Northeast India and Chittagong Hill Tracts in the Indo-Burma biodiversity hotspot. It was first described by botanist Cecil Ernest Claude Fischer from specimens provided by botanist Annie Dunnet Parry from the Lushai Hills.

== Taxonomy ==
British botanist Annie Dunnet Parry collected the plant specimen from present-day Mizoram at 1400m above sea level in March 1927. She lived there when her husband Neville Edward Parry who was posted as the superintendent of the Lushai Hills during the British colonial rule. Fischer first described the species in 1928 from Parry's collection and named it in her honour S. parryorum. By 1938, Fisher identified 19 other taxa from the genus Strobilanthes.

The S. parryorum specimen collected is now stored at the Kew Gardens' Herbarium. Until 2025, it was one of the only two known stored specimens in the world. The second specimen was collected by botanist Md. Salar Khan of the University of Dhaka in 1965 from the Chittagong Hill Tracts; now stored at the herbarium of Royal Botanic Garden Edinburgh. Khan was instrumental in starting the Bangladesh National Herbarium. A third set of specimens collected in 2025 is stored in Madras Christian College's Department of Botany's herbarium in Chennai.

== Description ==
Strobilanthes parryorum is a tall shrub with smooth branches, glabrous below and brown-tomentose above. The shrub can grow up to 2.5m. The leaves are ovate-elliptic, denticulate, acuminate, acute at base, 2-21 cm. They are 4-11 cm in length. It flowers and fruits from October to January.

In 2003 botanists John Richard Ironside Wood and Robert W. Scotland proposed that S. parryorum was possibly a subspecies of Strobilanthes denticulata. However, the differences of S. parryorum from S. denticulata were found to be notable and discernible. These included the larger bracts and number of calyx lobes. In addition, they are found in different parts of Indo-Burma hotspot.

== Distribution and habitat ==
The native and known distribution of the S. parryorum remains the Northeastern region of India. More specifically, it is found in Mizoram and the contiguous Chittagong Hill Tracts, i.e., the Arakan Mountains.

Parry collected her specimen from Darzo village in the Lushai Hills. She had also noted the plant in other villages around, namely Chhingchhip and Serkawn, in addition to the peak Phawngpui. In 2025 the species was once again recorded after 96 years by a group of botanists led by Lucy Lalawmpuii and Kholhring Lalchhandama from Pachhunga University College in Aizawl. This specimen was found near Ailawng village which is around 200km north of Darzo.

== Threats ==
Habitat loss, deforestation, shifting cultivation, and new plantations could threaten the survival of the species.
