= Strobilanthes penstemonoides =

Scientific classification
- Kingdom: Plantae
- Clade: Tracheophytes
- Clade: Angiosperms
- Clade: Eudicots
- Clade: Asterids
- Order: Lamiales
- Family: Acanthaceae
- Genus: Strobilanthes
- Species: S. penstemonoides

Binomial name
- Strobilanthes penstemonoides (Nees) T.Anderson

Synonyms
- Goldfussia chaffanjonii (H.Lév.) E.Hossain; Goldfussia flexuosa Nees; Goldfussia pentastemonoides Nees; Ruellia capitata Buchanan-Hamilton ex D.Don; Ruellia penstemonoides Wall.; Strobilanthes chaffanjonii H.Lév.; Strobilanthes hupehensis W.W.Sm.; Strobilanthes penstemonoides (Nees) T. Anderson; Strobilanthes pentstemonoides T.Anderson

Species of flowering plant

Strobilanthes penstemonoides is a species of flowering plant in the family Acanthaceae. It occurs in China, Bhutan, India, and Nepal. Its specific epithet has been spelled as penstemonoides, pentstemonoides, and pentastemonoides.
