= Strobilanthes capitata =

Scientific classification
- Kingdom: Plantae
- Clade: Tracheophytes
- Clade: Angiosperms
- Clade: Eudicots
- Clade: Asterids
- Order: Lamiales
- Family: Acanthaceae
- Genus: Strobilanthes
- Species: S. capitata

Binomial name
- Strobilanthes capitata (Nees) T.Anderson

Species of flowering plant

Strobilanthes capitata is a species of flowering plant in the family Acanthaceae.
