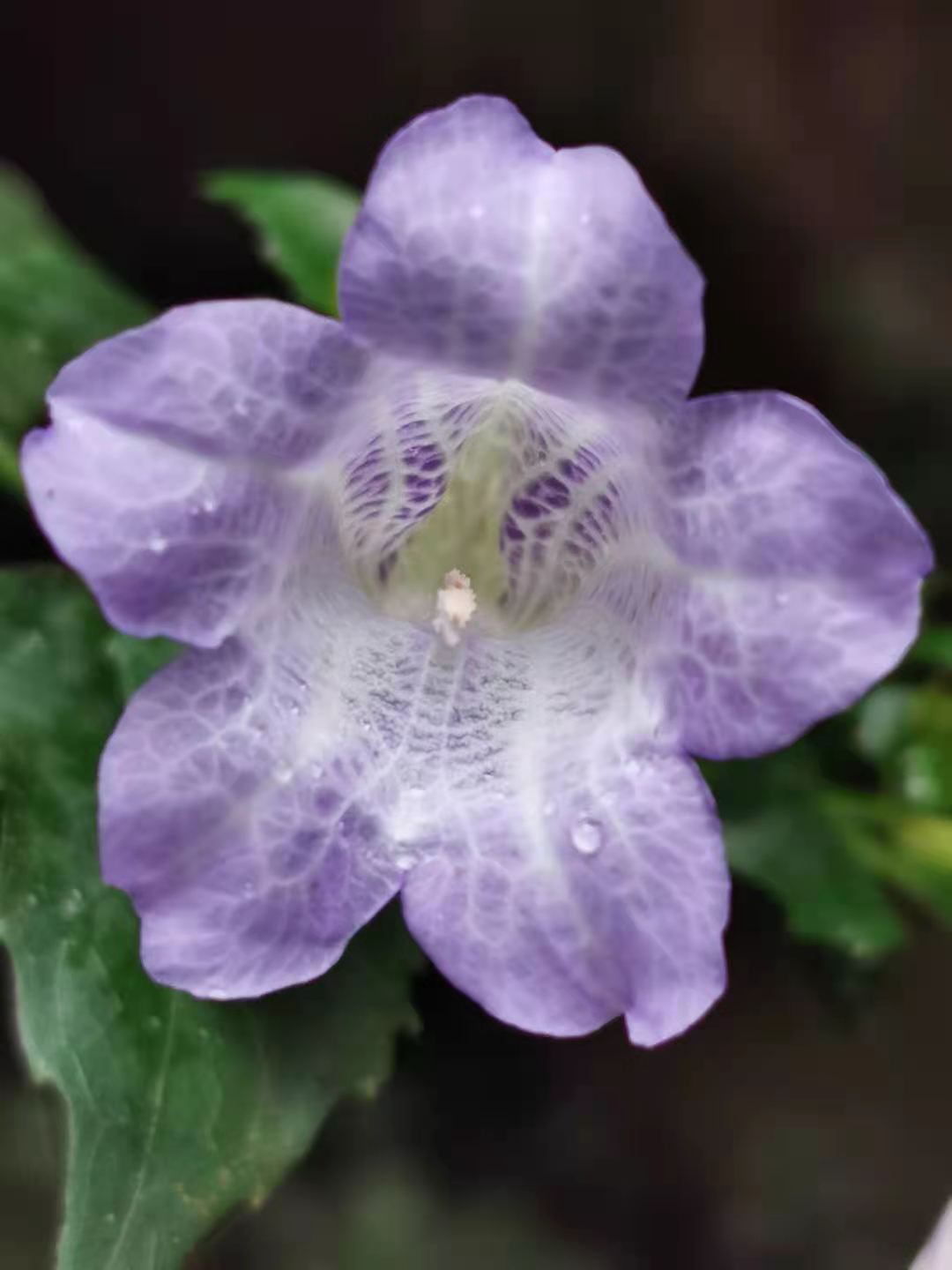
- Close-up of flower
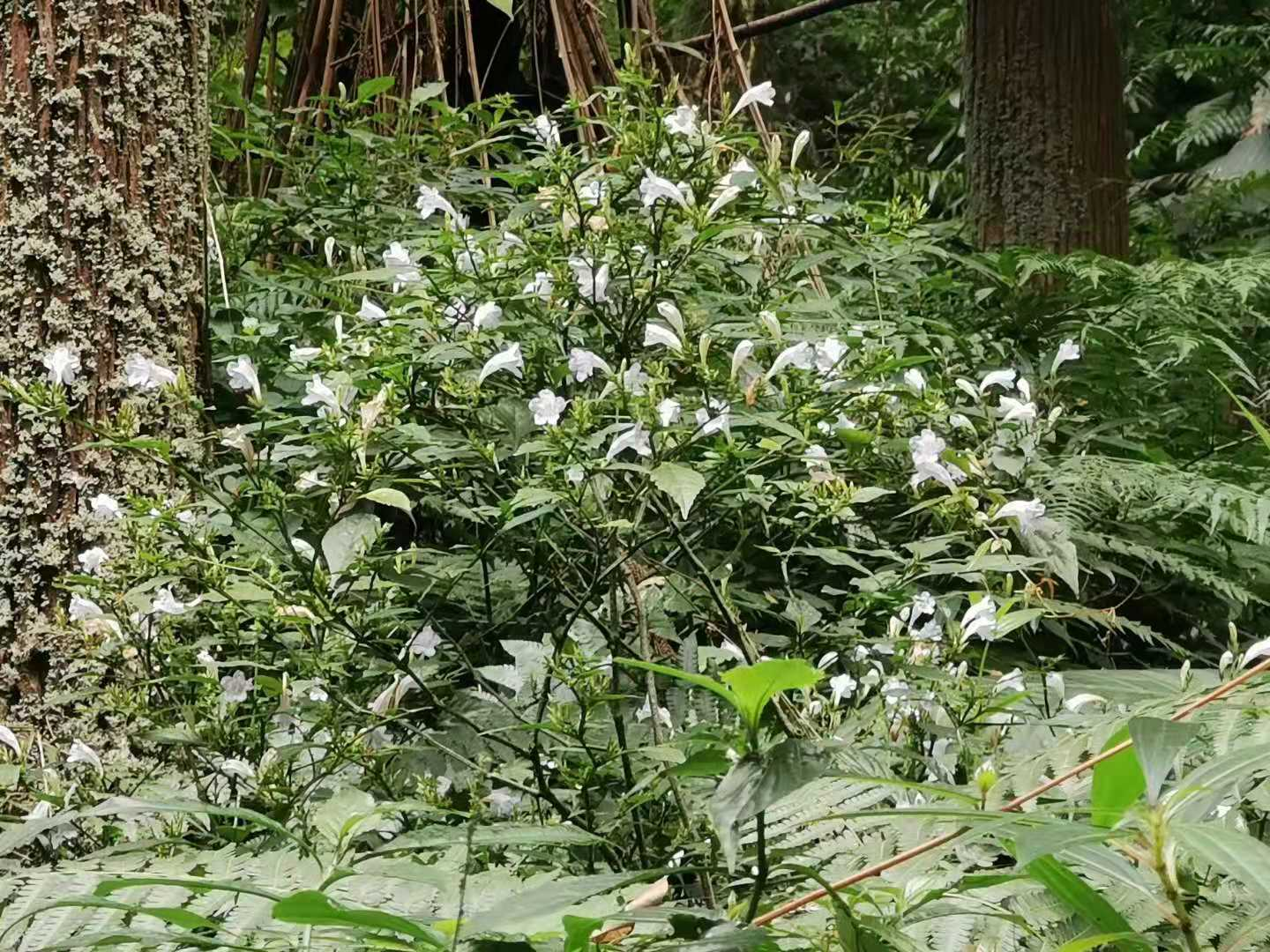
- Habit

Scientific classification
- Kingdom: Plantae
- Clade: Tracheophytes
- Clade: Angiosperms
- Clade: Eudicots
- Clade: Asterids
- Order: Lamiales
- Family: Acanthaceae
- Genus: Strobilanthes
- Species: S. flexicaulis

Binomial name
- Strobilanthes flexicaulis Hayata

Synonyms
- List: Championella fauriei (Benoist) C.Y.Wu & C.C.Hu; Parachampionella flexicaulis (Hayata) C.F.Hsieh & T.C.Huang; Parachampionella glandulifera (Hatus.) S.S.Ying; Parachampionella tashiroi (Hayata) Bremek.; Strobilanthes fauriei Benoist; Strobilanthes glandulifera Hatus.; Strobilanthes prionophylla Hayata; Strobilanthes tashiroi Hayata; Triaenacanthus flexicaulis (Hayata) C.F.Hsieh & T.C.Huang; Triaenacanthus glandulifera (Hatus.) C.F.Hsieh & T.C.Huang

= Strobilanthes flexicaulis =

Species of plant

Strobilanthes flexicaulis is a species of flowering plant in the family Acanthaceae, native to the Ryukyus and Taiwan. A much-branched subshrub reaching 1 m (3 ft), it is found at elevations from 200 to 2,300 m (700 to 7,500 ft), typically beside streams in forests.

== Subtaxa ==
The following varieties are accepted:

- Strobilanthes flexicaulis var. flexicaulis – Ryukyus, Taiwan
- Strobilanthes flexicaulis var. tashiroi (Hayata) T.Yamaz. – entire range

All Strobilanthes flexicaulis var. flexicaulis individuals simultaneously flower at six-year intervals, and then die, but S. f. var. tashiroi does not exhibit periodic mass flowering.

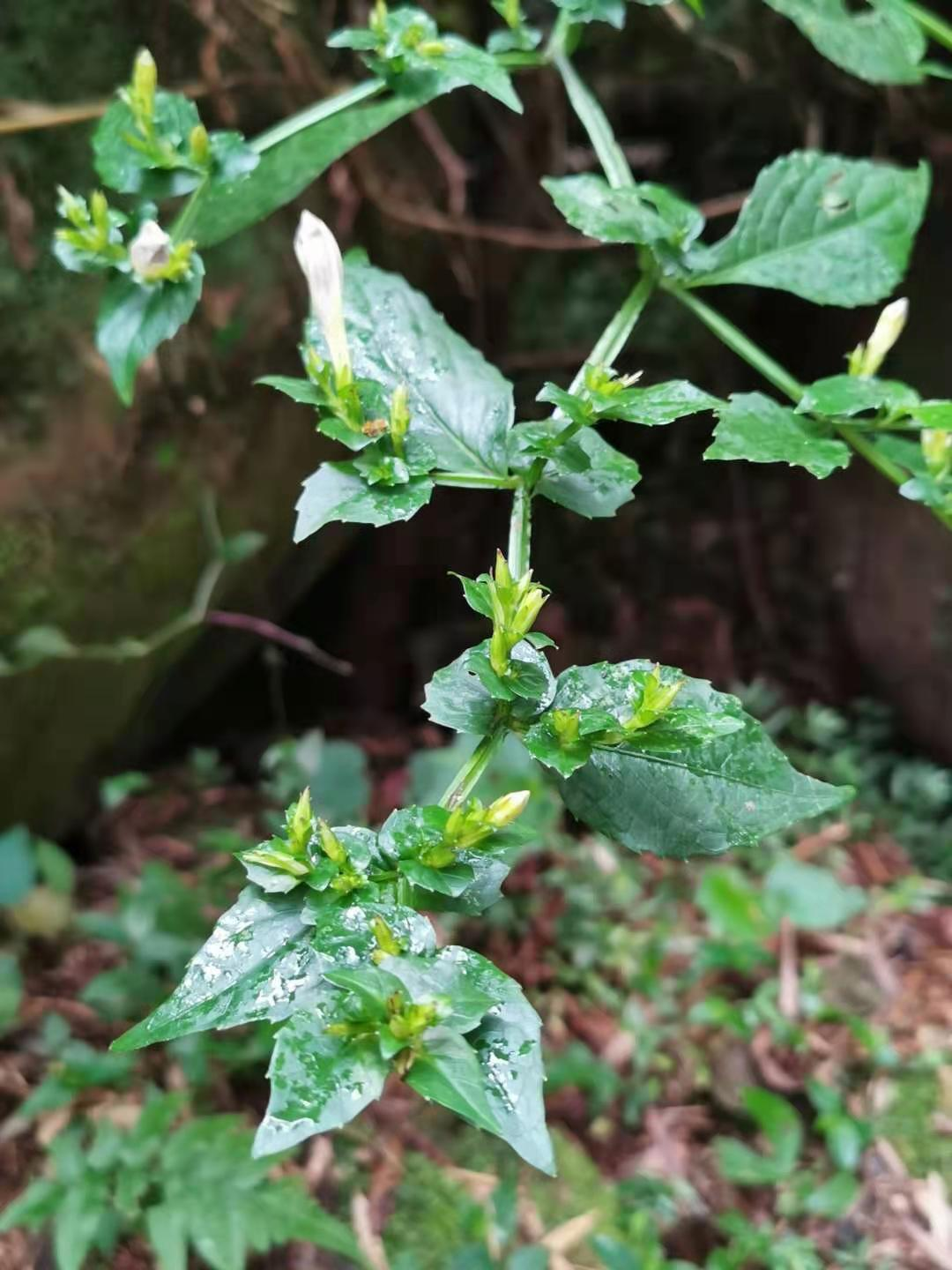
Leaves

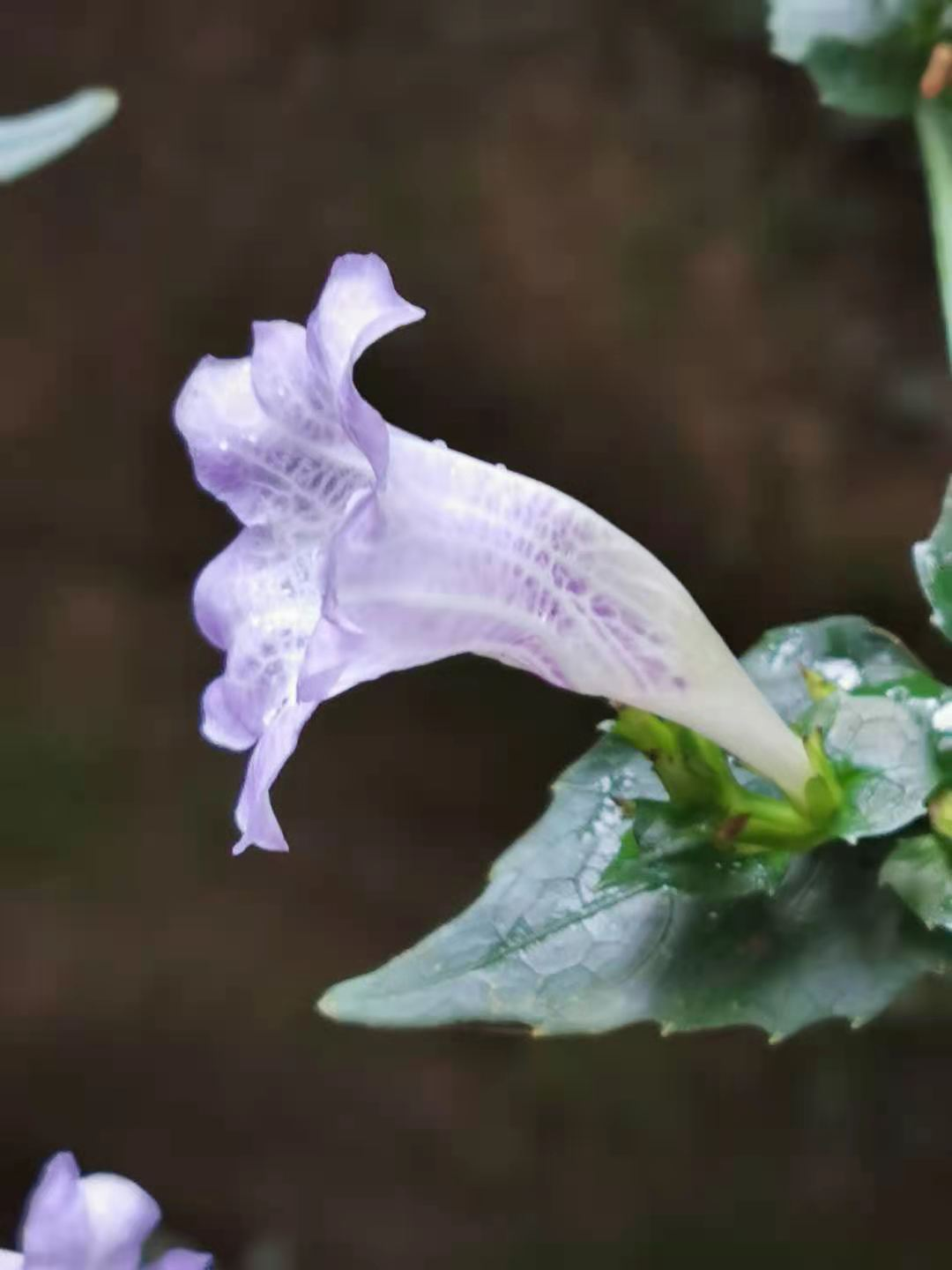
Side view of flower
