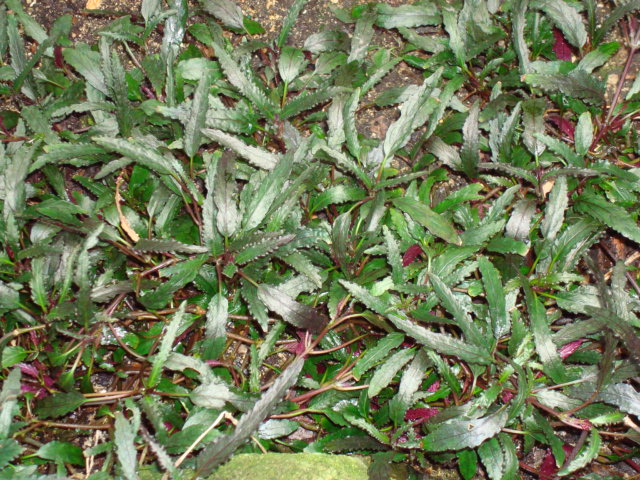

Scientific classification
- Kingdom: Plantae
- Clade: Tracheophytes
- Clade: Angiosperms
- Clade: Eudicots
- Clade: Asterids
- Order: Lamiales
- Family: Acanthaceae
- Genus: Strobilanthes
- Species: S. sinuata

Binomial name
- Strobilanthes sinuata J.R.I.Wood

Synonyms
- Ruellia repanda L.; Hemigraphis repanda (L.) Hallier f.

= Strobilanthes sinuata =

Species of flowering plant

Strobilanthes sinuata (synonym Hemigraphis repanda) is a species of plant of family Acanthaceae. It is also known as Dragon's Tongue plant, with foliage of purple or green leaves.
