= Strobilanthes formosana =

Scientific classification
- Kingdom: Plantae
- Clade: Tracheophytes
- Clade: Angiosperms
- Clade: Eudicots
- Clade: Asterids
- Order: Lamiales
- Family: Acanthaceae
- Genus: Strobilanthes
- Species: S. formosana

Binomial name
- Strobilanthes formosana S.Moore

Synonyms
- Goldfussia formosana (S.Moore) C.F.Hsieh & T.C.Huang

Species of plant

Strobilanthes formosana is a species of flowering plant in the family Acanthaceae, native to Taiwan. A perennial herb reaching 80 cm (31 in), it is found in forest ravines, at elevations from 700 to 2,300 m (2,300 to 7,500 ft). Paiwan people extracted a blue dye from its roots.
