= Strobilanthes wightii =

Scientific classification
- Kingdom: Plantae
- Clade: Tracheophytes
- Clade: Angiosperms
- Clade: Eudicots
- Clade: Asterids
- Order: Lamiales
- Family: Acanthaceae
- Genus: Strobilanthes
- Species: S. wightii

Binomial name
- Strobilanthes wightii (Bremek.) J.R.I.Wood

Species of flowering plant

Strobilanthes wightii is a shrub 2 to 3 meters (6.6 to 9.8 ft) in height, belonging to the acanthus family (Acanthaceae) and native to the Mundanthurai Forest in India. It is also called Stenosiphonium wightii. Its common name is Wight's coneflower. It is best known for its remarkable thirteen-year blooming cycle, having verified blooms in 1958, 1971, 1984 and 1997.
