= Strobilanthes jomyi =

Scientific classification
- Kingdom: Plantae
- Clade: Tracheophytes
- Clade: Angiosperms
- Clade: Eudicots
- Clade: Asterids
- Order: Lamiales
- Family: Acanthaceae
- Genus: Strobilanthes
- Species: S. jomyi

Binomial name
- Strobilanthes jomyi P.Biju, Josekutty, Rekha & J.R.I.Wood

Species of shrub

Strobilanthes jomyi is a species of flowering plant in the family Acanthaceae.

== Description ==
Strobilanthes jomyi is a large shrub growing up to 5m tall. Hairless tetragonal stems have swollen nodes. The drooping flowers are seen in clusters of 5 to 15 spikes. Flower cluster stalks have fine velvet hairs. Flowers are hairless except inside around the staminal sheath, become swollen above, bluish with white basal tube. Petals are pale blue, ovate-round, blunt and hairless. Sepals are white, elliptic, somewhat pointed and fringed with hairs. Bracts and bracteoles are deep purple. Ovate-elliptical leaves are seen in unequal pairs. Leaf Tips are tapering, Margins distantly rounded toothed and hairy.

Strobilanthes jomyi is found in Western Ghats of Kerala and Karnataka.
