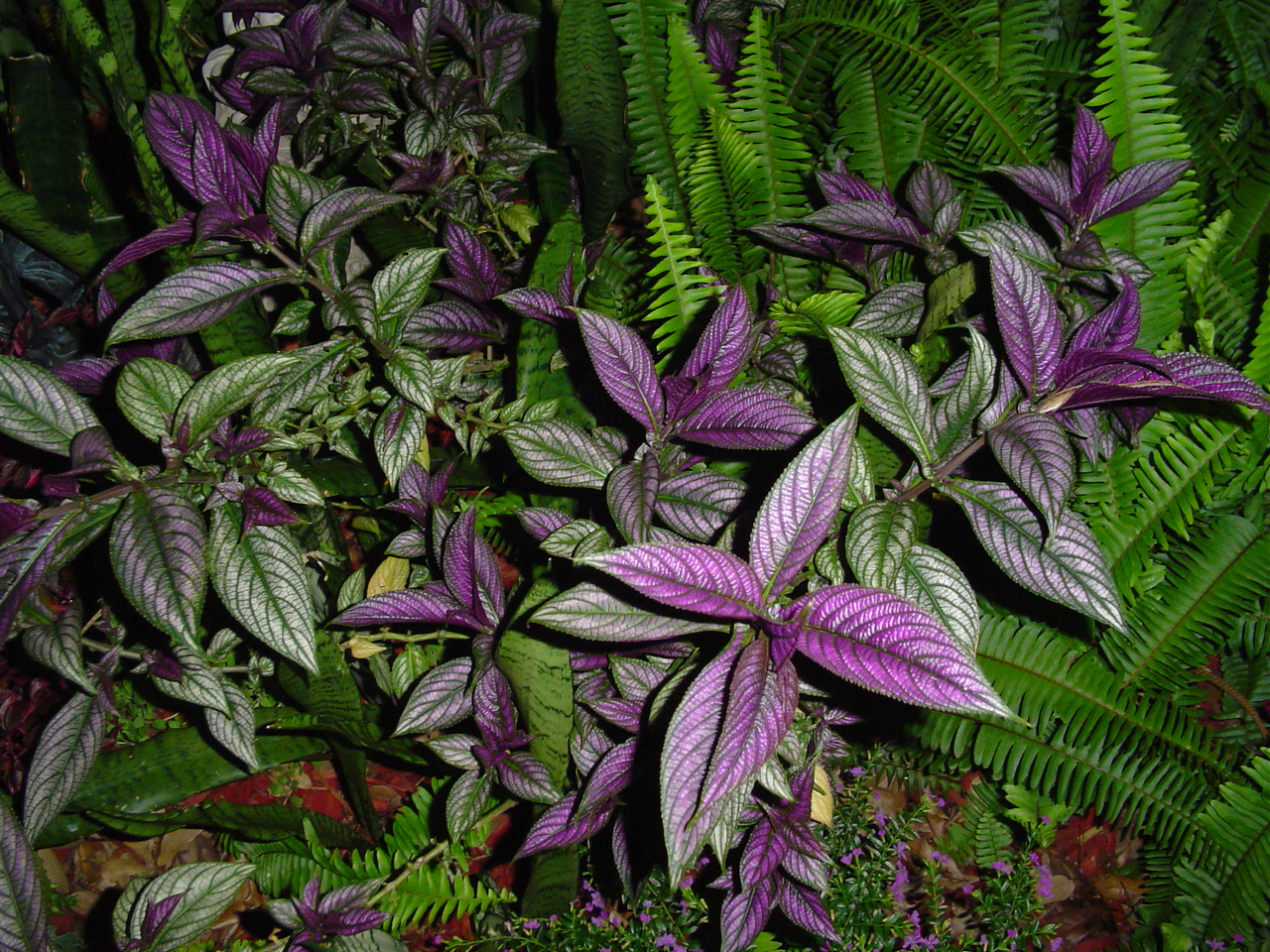

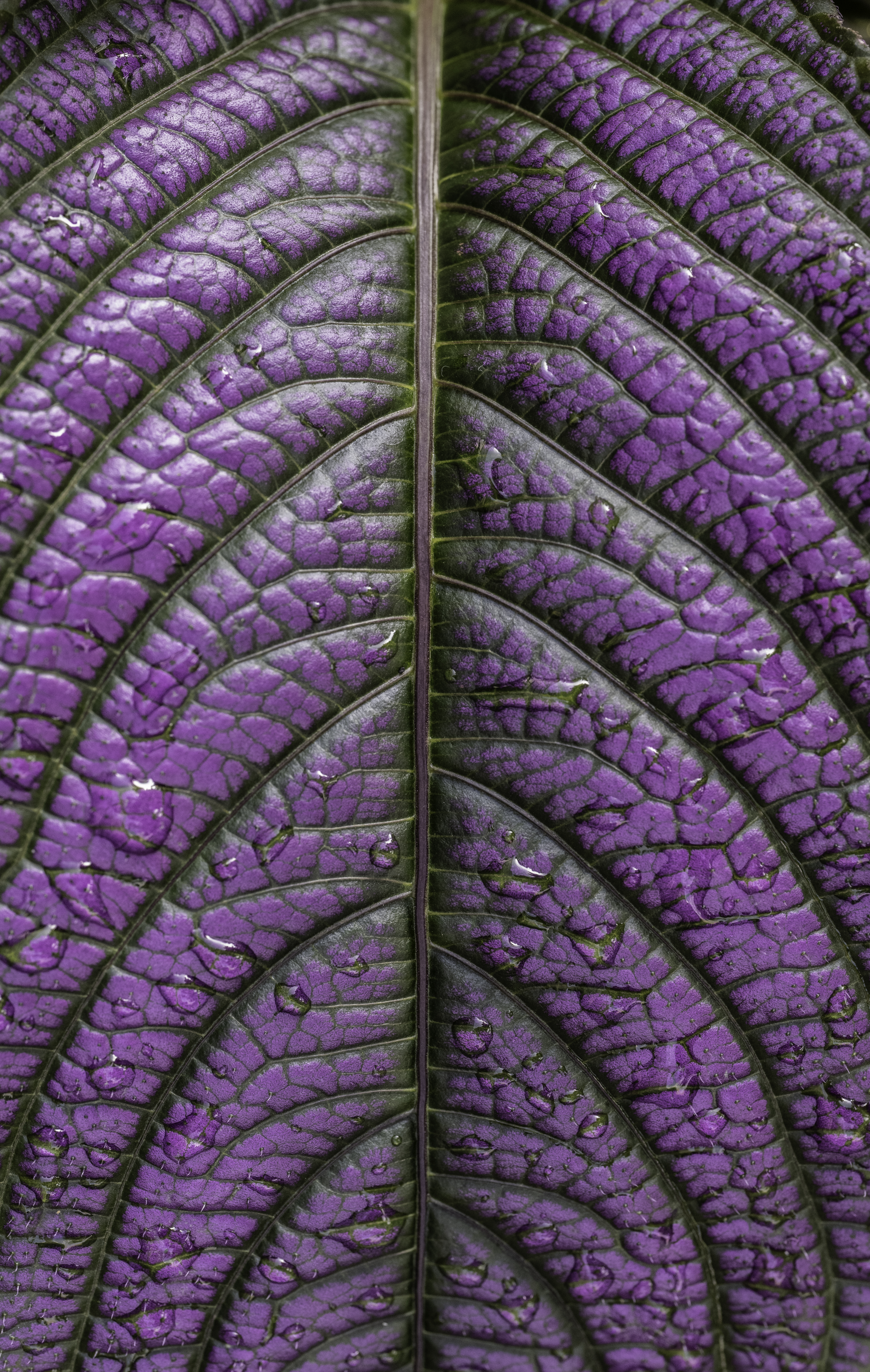

Scientific classification
- Kingdom: Plantae
- Clade: Tracheophytes
- Clade: Angiosperms
- Clade: Eudicots
- Clade: Asterids
- Order: Lamiales
- Family: Acanthaceae
- Genus: Strobilanthes
- Species: S. dyeriana

Binomial name
- Strobilanthes dyeriana Mast.

= Strobilanthes dyeriana =

Species of flowering plant

Strobilanthes dyeriana, the Persian shield or royal purple plant, is a species of flowering plant in the acanthus family Acanthaceae, native to Myanmar (formerly Burma).

== Name ==
The Latin specific epithet dyeriana honours the English botanist Sir William Turner Thiselton-Dyer (1843–1928).

== Description ==
Growing to 1 m (3.3 ft) tall and broad, it is a tropical evergreen shrub, cultivated for its dark green foliage with bright, metallic-purple stripes radiating outward from the central leaf vein. In proper conditions, it will also produce pale purple flowers.

== Cultivation ==
With a minimum temperature of 10 °C (50 °F), S. dyeriana grows best in USDA Zones 10–11. In more temperate climates it is grown as a houseplant. It prefers a warm, humid position in good light. As the intense purple colour may fade with age, it is often treated as an annual. In the UK it has gained the Royal Horticultural Society's Award of Garden Merit. S. dyeriana is sold as a very common landscape plant due to its vibrant colors. In order to produce a high quality version of this plant, it is best to use a 200 mg*L-1*N from a complete fertilizer.
