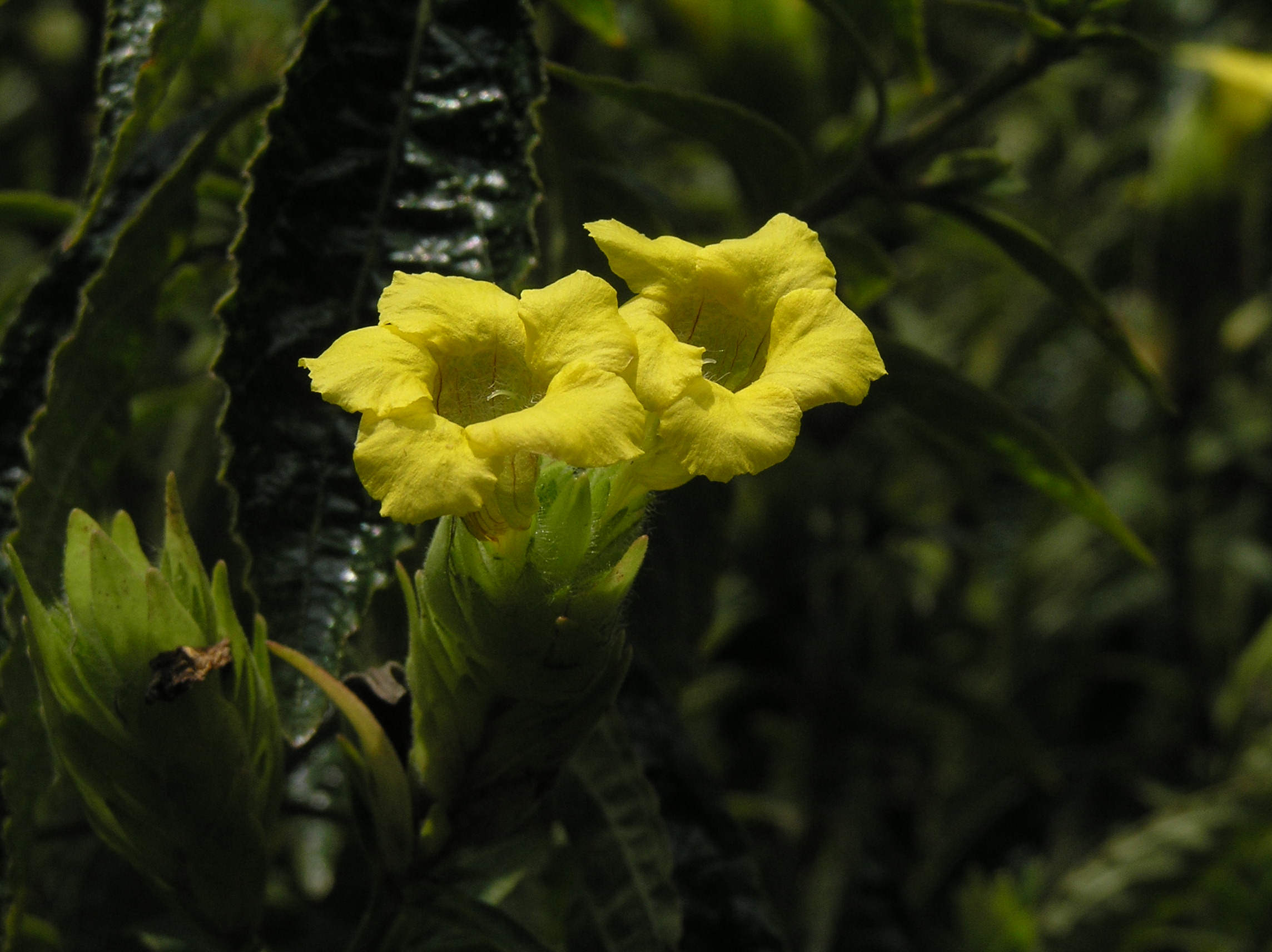

Scientific classification
- Kingdom: Plantae
- Clade: Embryophytes
- Clade: Tracheophytes
- Clade: Spermatophytes
- Clade: Angiosperms
- Clade: Eudicots
- Clade: Asterids
- Order: Lamiales
- Family: Acanthaceae
- Genus: Strobilanthes
- Species: S. crispa

Binomial name
- Strobilanthes crispa Blume

Synonyms
- Hemigraphis crispa (L.) T.Anderson; Ruellia crispa L.; Sericocalyx crispus (L.) Bremek.

= Strobilanthes crispa =

Species of shrub

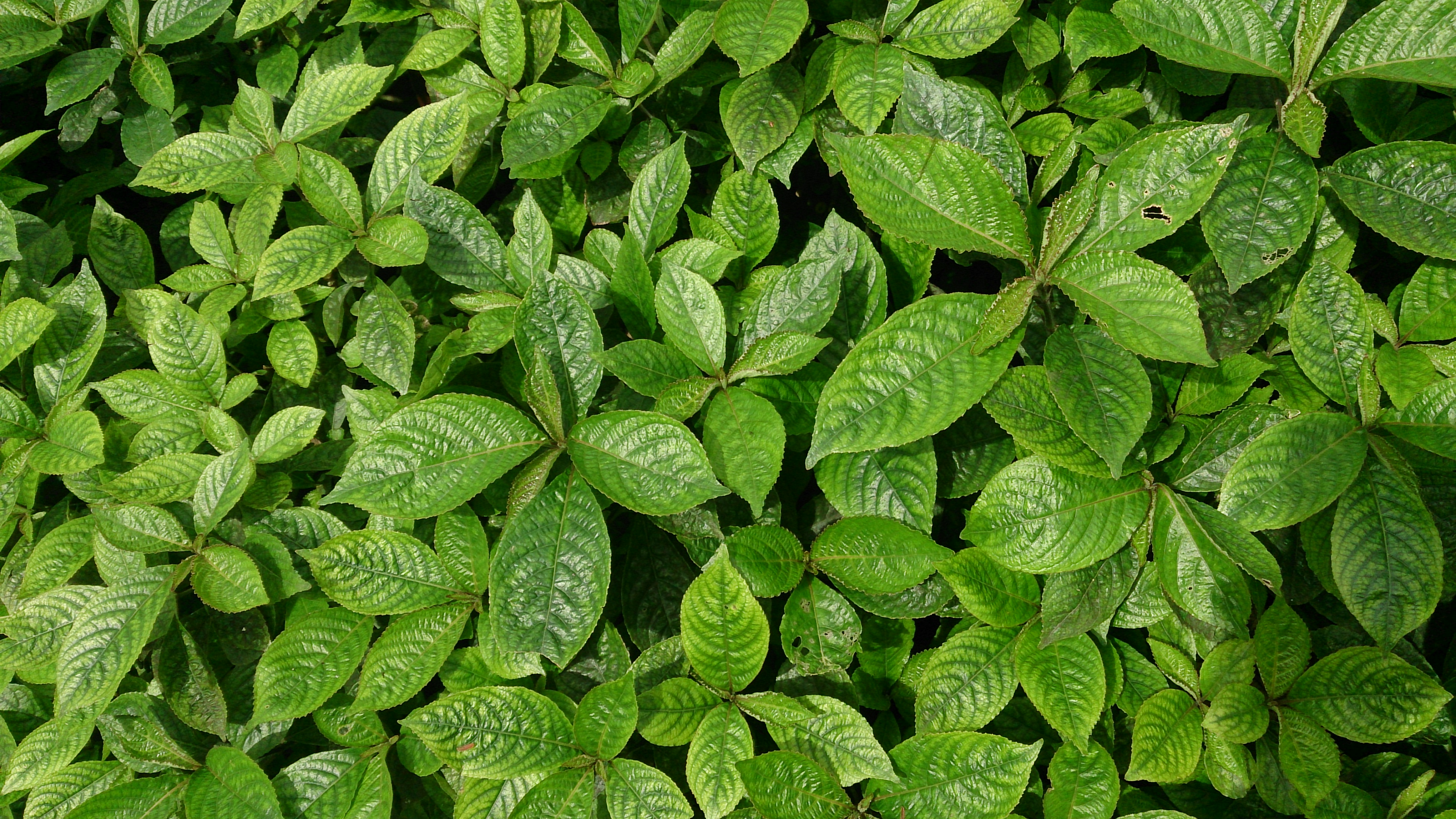
Leaves

Strobilanthes crispa is a shrub which originated from Madagascar, and is now found across south east Asia. It is a member of the family Acanthaceae. It is known as pokok pecah kaca or pokok pecah beling in Malaysia, and pecah beling, enyoh kilo, kecibeling or kejibeling in Indonesia. The leaves are used traditionally for treatment of cancer and diabetes, usually taken as a tea or infusion of the leaves.
