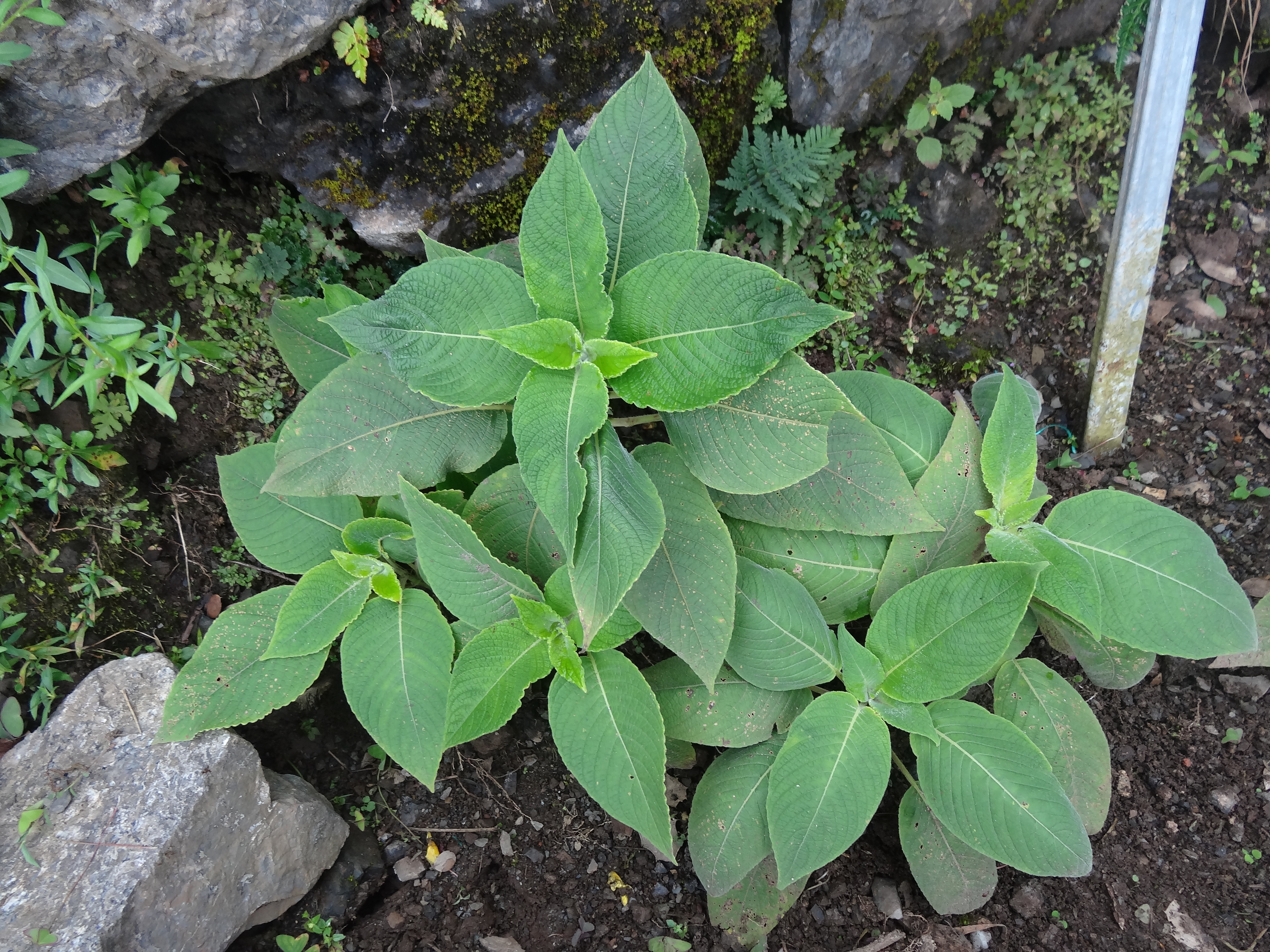

Scientific classification
- Kingdom: Plantae
- Clade: Tracheophytes
- Clade: Angiosperms
- Clade: Eudicots
- Clade: Asterids
- Order: Lamiales
- Family: Acanthaceae
- Genus: Strobilanthes
- Species: S. tomentosa

Binomial name
- Strobilanthes tomentosa (Nees) J.R.I.Wood (2009)

Synonyms
- Synonymy: Aechmanthera claudiae Bernardi (1963); Aechmanthera gossypina (Wall.) Nees (1832); Aechmanthera leiosperma C.B.Clarke (1884); Aechmanthera tomentosa Nees (1832); Aechmanthera tomentosa var. wallichii C.B.Clarke (1884); Aechmanthera wallichii Nees (1847), nom. superfl.; Aechmanthera wallichii subvar. fomentaria Nees (1847); Aechmanthera wallichii var. gossypina (Wall.) Nees (1847); Aechmanthera wallichii f. leuconeura Nees (1847); Aechmanthera wallichii var. tomentosa (Nees) Nees (1847), nom. illeg.; Barleria blinii H.Lév. (1913), pro syn.; Barleria cavaleriei H.Lév. (1913), pro syn.; Ruellia diffusa Royle ex Nees (1847), not validly publ.; Ruellia gossypina Wall. (1830); Ruellia tomentosa Wall. (1830), not validly publ.; Strobilanthes blinii H.Lév. (1913); Strobilanthes bodinieri H.Lév. (1913); Strobilanthes cavaleriei H.Lév. (1913)

= Strobilanthes tomentosa =

Species of flowering plant

Strobilanthes tomentosa is a species of perennial flowering plant native to subtropical areas of Asia, ranging from northern Pakistan along the Himalayas to northern Indochina (Laos and Myanmar) and southern China (Yunnan and Guizhou).
