= Strobilanthes heteromalla =

Scientific classification
- Kingdom: Plantae
- Clade: Tracheophytes
- Clade: Angiosperms
- Clade: Eudicots
- Clade: Asterids
- Order: Lamiales
- Family: Acanthaceae
- Genus: Strobilanthes
- Species: S. heteromalla

Binomial name
- Strobilanthes heteromalla T.Anderson ex C.B.Clarke

Species of shrub

Strobilanthes heteromalla is a large shrub in the family Acanthaceae, native to the Coonoor Ghat region of India. It is one of the species of Strobilanthes with a very long blooming cycle. It was seen flowering in 1850 and not again until 1886 leaving open the possibility of a 36-year cycle, but as Gamble notes three 12-year or two eighteen year cycles might have somehow gone unnoticed.

More recent studies have indicated a flowering interval of 14 years, compared to 12 years in the related Strobilanthes kunthiana.
