= Strobilanthes sexennis =

Scientific classification
- Kingdom: Plantae
- Clade: Tracheophytes
- Clade: Angiosperms
- Clade: Eudicots
- Clade: Asterids
- Order: Lamiales
- Family: Acanthaceae
- Genus: Strobilanthes
- Species: S. sexennis

Binomial name
- Strobilanthes sexennis Nees

Species of plant

Strobilanthes sexennis is a small shrub in the family Gesneriaceae. According to Norman Myers, it has a twelve year blooming cycle although not as well documented as some other species. It is endemic to Sri Lanka, where it grows in wet tropical conditions.
