= Strobilanthes japonica =

Scientific classification
- Kingdom: Plantae
- Clade: Tracheophytes
- Clade: Angiosperms
- Clade: Eudicots
- Clade: Asterids
- Order: Lamiales
- Family: Acanthaceae
- Genus: Strobilanthes
- Species: S. japonica

Binomial name
- Strobilanthes japonica (Thunberg)

Synonyms
- Acanthopale japonica (Thunberg) C. B. Clarke ex S. Moore; Championella japonica (Thunberg) Bremekamp; Ruellia japonica Thunberg; Strobilanthes bonatianus H. Léveillé

Species of flowering plant

Strobilanthes japonica is a flowering herbaceous perennial plant from Asia, one of around 350 plants of the genus Strobilanthes. The 20–50 cm ornamental plant is cultivated in Japan and China, and blooms in autumn with 1.5 cm purple to white funnel-shaped flowers.

== Description ==
Strobilanthes japonica grows 20–50 cm in height, with thin, heavily-branching stems and purplish-red glabrous (smooth) branchlets. Its leaves are simple and opposite, attached by 2–5 cm petioles, are narrow elliptic or lanceolate in shape, 2–5 cm long and 0.5-1.8 cm wide, and are glabrous and densely covered with cystoliths. The plant flowers from August or September to October or November, with 1.5 cm purple to white 5-lobed funnel-shaped corollas, which produce loculicidal capsules with four ovate seeds.

The species appears similar to Strobilanthes tretraspermus (Champ. ex Benth.) Druce in China, but S. japonica has lanceolate leaves and glabrous ovary, and S. tretraspermus has a pubescent calyx.

== Distribution ==
Earlier thought to be indigenous to Japan, S. japonica is now thought to have been introduced from China.

Partial distribution includes regions of Japan (Shikoku and Kyushu) and regions of China (Chongqing, Guizhou, Hubei, Hunan and Sichuan). ("Note: This information is based on publications available through Tropicos and may not represent the entire distribution.") The plant typically grows at 500–1100 meters altitude, and Flora of China notes that it is often found near temples and religious sites. In Japan, it is "cultivated for ornamental purpose, rarely naturalized on S. Kyushu"), and "wild plants are not known in China," according to Flora of Japan.

== Naming ==
Common names include イセハナビ or 伊勢花火 (Ise-hanabi, meaning "Ise fireworks") in Japanese, 日本黄 (RìBenHuáng) in Chinese, and 日本马蓝 (RìBenMaLán) in Mandarin Chinese. An 1852 French journal transliterated two common Japanese names as "Ise fanabi" and "Iwa kikyau." There is no common name in English.

Synonyms include Acanthopale japonica (Thunberg) C. B. Clarke ex S. Moore, Championella japonica (Thunberg) Bremekamp, Ruellia japonica Thunberg (from 1784), and Strobilanthes bontaiana H. Léveillé.

== Conservation status ==
Strobilanthes japonica was listed as Vulnerable in the 1997 IUCN Red List of Threatened Plants.
