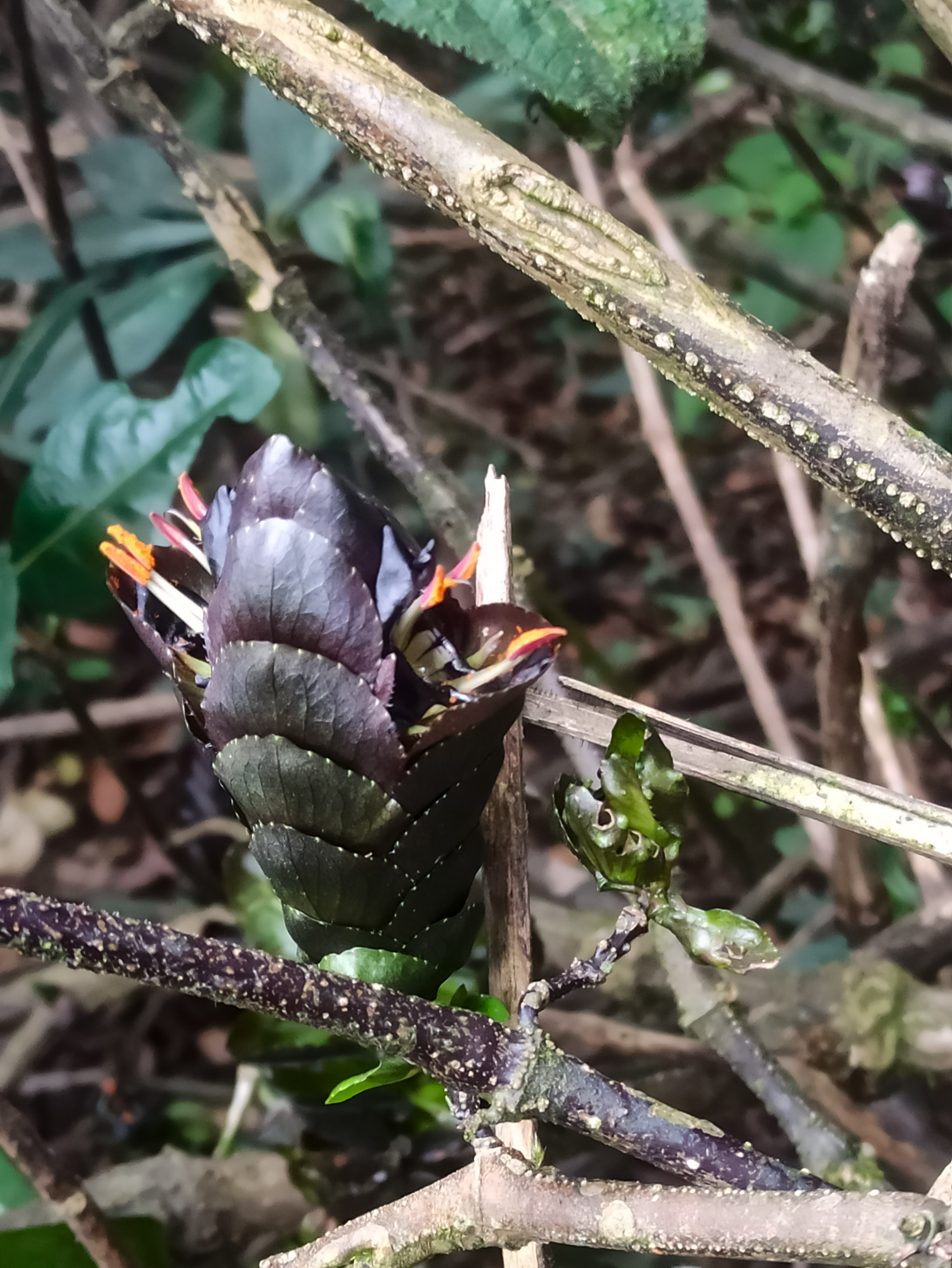

Scientific classification
- Kingdom: Plantae
- Clade: Tracheophytes
- Clade: Angiosperms
- Clade: Eudicots
- Clade: Asterids
- Order: Lamiales
- Family: Acanthaceae
- Genus: Strobilanthes
- Species: S. lurida

Binomial name
- Strobilanthes lurida Wight

= Strobilanthes lurida =

Flower species

Strobilanthes lurida is a species of flowering plant, endemic to Southern Western Ghats.

== Description ==
Strobilanthes lurida is a large, branched shrub, with thick hairless stem, swollen at nodes. Flowers are borne in spikes, from older stems. Purple bracts, white bracteoles, two lipped purple flowers. Flower-tube is about 2 mm long; swollen portion widening above gradually, hairless outside, hairy inside, 5-petalled. Petals are ovate, blunt, about 3 mm long. Four stamens, united at the base in pair to form a staminal sheath. Filaments are about 1.5 cm long. Ovary is on a prominent disc, about 2.5 mm.

Oppositely arranged saw tooth margin, ovate-elliptic leaves are blunt towards base. Tapering at tip, leathery, hairy, densely hairy beneath. 5 cm long leaf stalks are slightly hairy. Capsules are ovoid-ellipsoid, about 2 cm long, tapering, hairless, included in bracts.Flowering season is December–April.

== Range ==
Seen in evergreen shola forests of southern Western Ghats at altitude of 500-1500m
