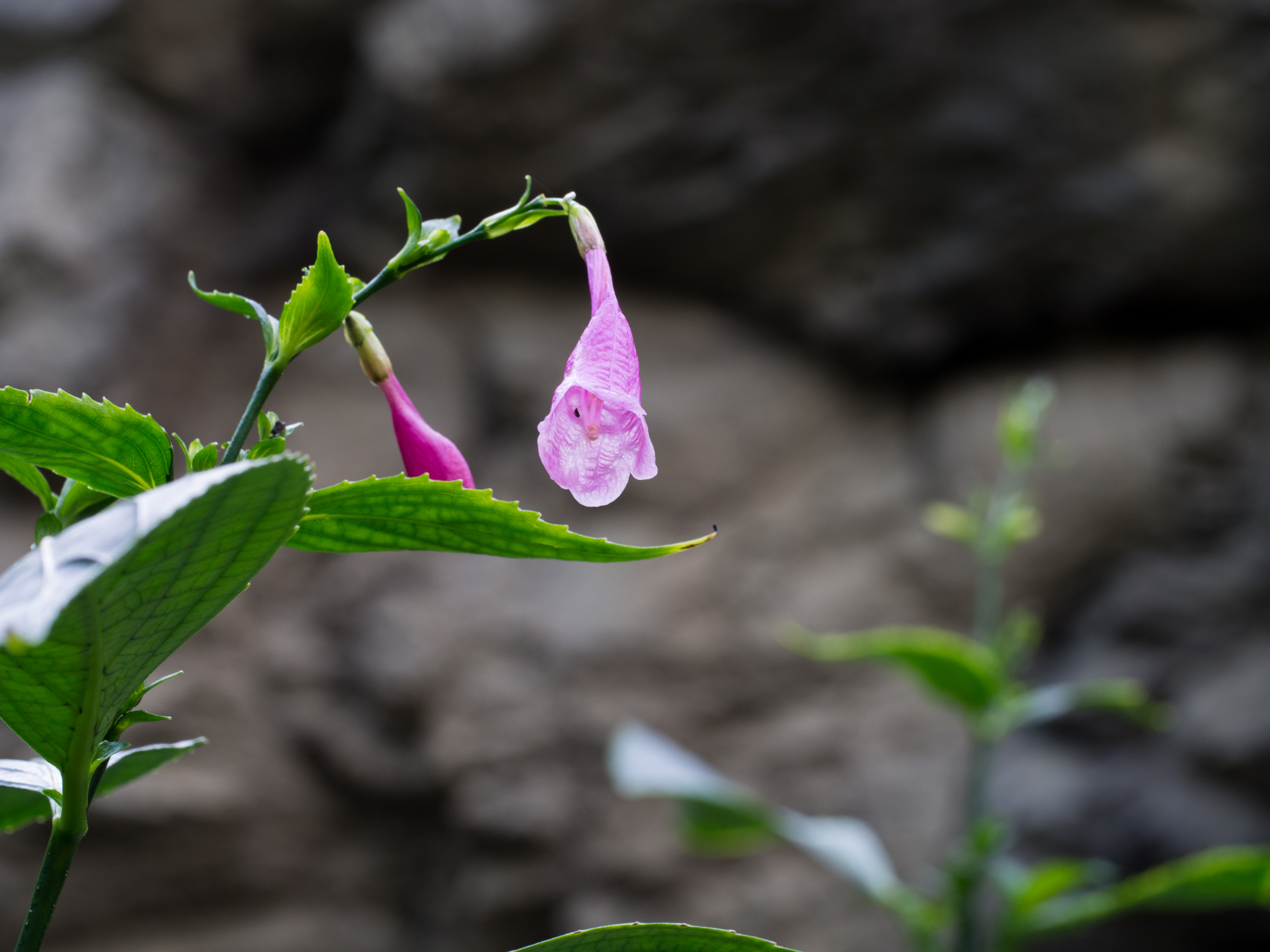

Scientific classification
- Kingdom: Plantae
- Clade: Tracheophytes
- Clade: Angiosperms
- Clade: Eudicots
- Clade: Asterids
- Order: Lamiales
- Family: Acanthaceae
- Genus: Strobilanthes
- Species: S. cusia

Binomial name
- Strobilanthes cusia Nees

= Strobilanthes cusia =

Species of flowering plant

Strobilanthes cusia, also known as Assam indigo or Chinese rain bell, is a perennial flowering plant of the family Acanthaceae. Native to South Asia, China, and Indochina, it was historically cultivated on a large scale in India and China as a source of indigo dye, which is also known as Assam indigo. In addition to being used for dye, it is also used in the traditional Chinese herbal medicine "Qingdai". Other names for this dicot include Pink strobilanthes and Strobilanthes flaccidifolius, where flaccidifolius is Latin for "drooping leaves".
