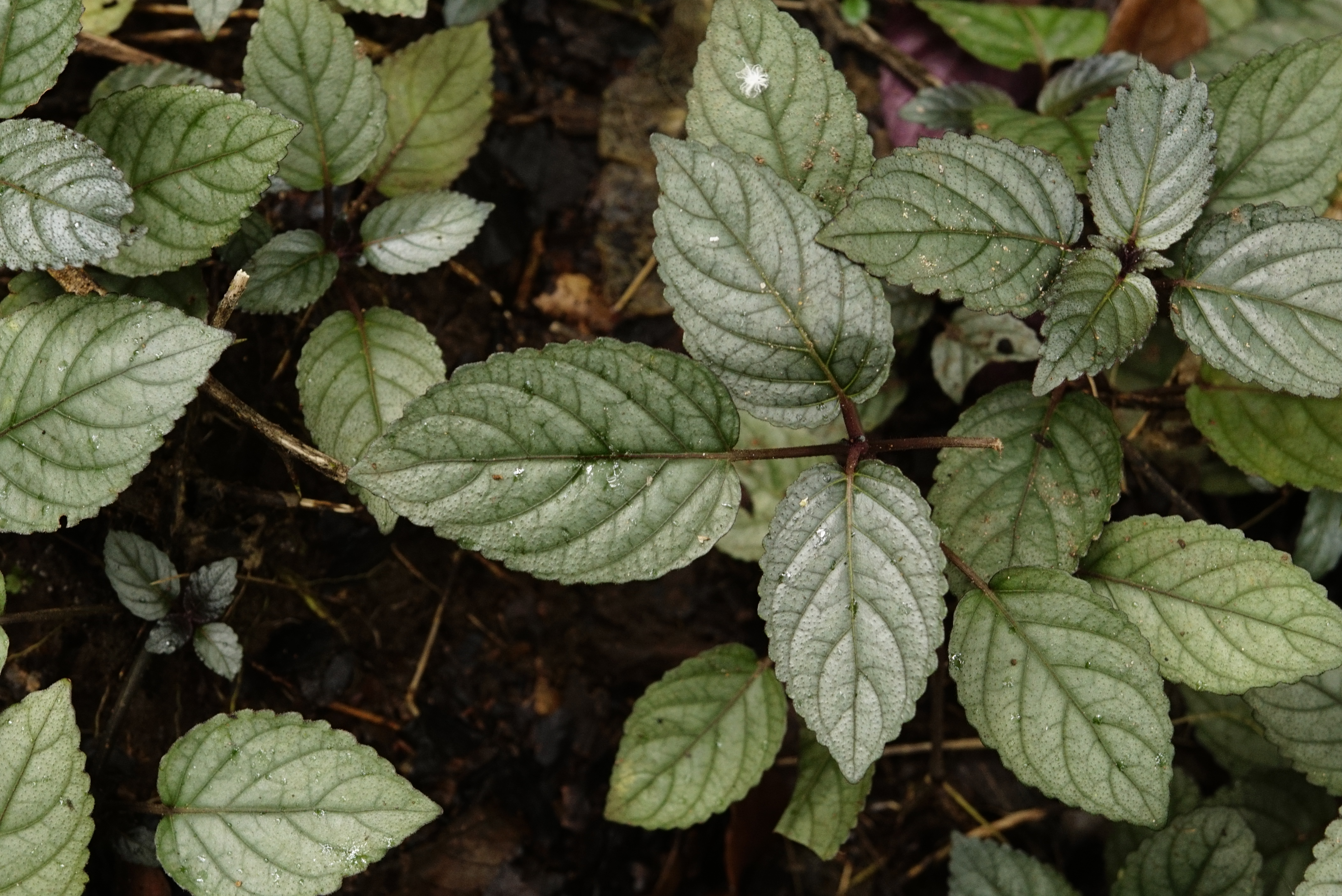

Scientific classification
- Kingdom: Plantae
- Clade: Tracheophytes
- Clade: Angiosperms
- Clade: Eudicots
- Clade: Asterids
- Order: Lamiales
- Family: Acanthaceae
- Genus: Strobilanthes
- Species: S. alternata

Binomial name
- Strobilanthes alternata (Burm.f.) Moylan ex J.R.I.Wood

Synonyms
- Blechum cordatum Leonard; Goldfussia colorata (Blume) Moritzi; Hemigraphis alternata (Burm.f.) T.Anderson; Hemigraphis colorata W.Bull; Hemigraphis colorata L.; Hemigraphis colorata (Blume) Hallier f.; Ruellia alternata Burm.f.; Ruellia colorata Blume

= Strobilanthes alternata =

Species of flowering plant

Strobilanthes alternata (synonym Hemigraphis alternata), may be known as red ivy, red-flame ivy, or waffle plant, is a member of the family Acanthaceae native to Java. It is a prostrate plant with purple colored leaves.

== Description ==
Strobilanthes alternata is a herbaceous plant that reaches approximately 30 cm (12 in) in length. The stems of the plant are prostrate and purplish, especially at the nodes. The leaves, which are covered in fine hairs, are arranged oppositely on the stem with one leaf noticeably larger than its counterpart. The leaf blades are dark green on the top face and are lighter green or purplish on the lower face. Commonly known as the Cemetery plant, Purple waffle plant, or Murikooti, it is referred to in Ayurvedic medicine as Vranaropani, which translates to "wound healer". In Kerala, India, the local name for this herb is Muriyan pacha, a name related to belief in its wound-healing properties. This plant is native to the tropical regions of the globe especially tropical Malaysia and South East Asia. This natural herb grows in plenty across India, China, Indonesia, and Japan

== Uses ==
In Indonesia, Strobilanthes alternata is used to promote urination, check and heal hemorrhages, stop dysentery, and treat venereal diseases.

The plant is popular in the United States and rarely the United Kingdom to use in hanging baskets for gardens.The botanical name of Red flame ivy is Hemigraphis colorata Blume.
