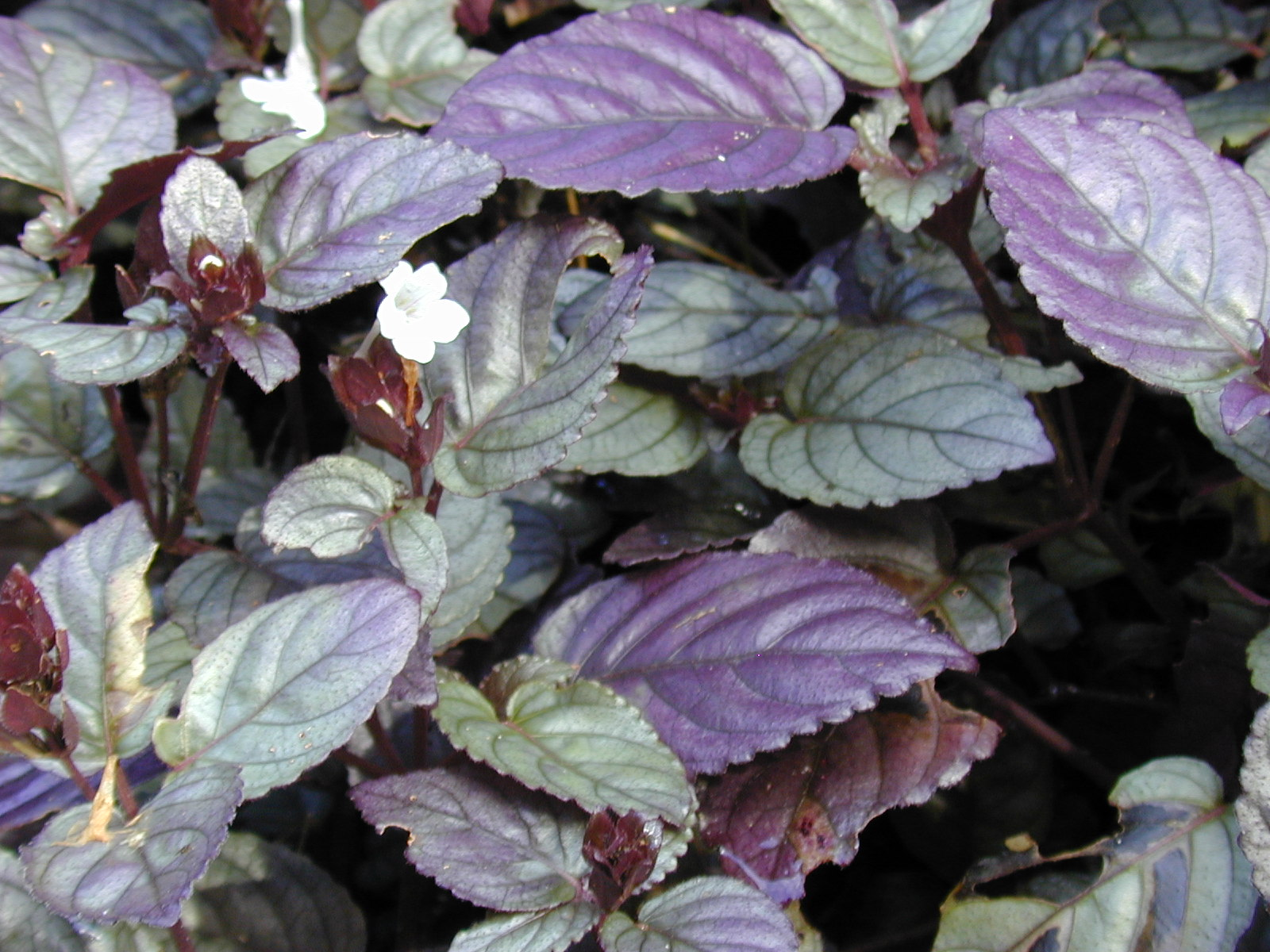
- Strobilanthes species, cultivated in Hawaii

Scientific classification
- Kingdom: Plantae
- Clade: Embryophytes
- Clade: Tracheophytes
- Clade: Angiosperms
- Clade: Eudicots
- Clade: Asterids
- Order: Lamiales
- Family: Acanthaceae
- Subfamily: Acanthoideae
- Tribe: Ruellieae
- Genus: Strobilanthes; Blume

Type species
- Strobilanthes cernua Blume

Species
- See text.

Synonyms
- List: Adenacanthus Nees; Adenostachya Bremek.; Aechmanthera Nees; Apolepsis Hassk.; Baphicacanthus Bremek.; Buteraea Nees; Carvia Bremek.; Championella Bremek.; Clarkeasia J.R.I.Wood; Ctenopaepale Bremek.; Didyplosandra Wight ex Bremek.; Diflugossa Bremek.; Ditrichospermum Bremek.; Dossifluga Bremek.; Echinopaepale Bremek.; Endopogon Nees; Eriostrobilus Bremek.; Goldfussia Nees; Gutzlaffia Hance; Gymapsis Bremek.; Hymenochlaena Bremek.; Kanjarum Ramam.; Kjellbergia Bremek.; Lamiacanthus Kuntze; Larsenia Bremek.; Leptacanthus Nees; Lissospermum Bremek.; Listrobanthes Bremek.; Mackenziea Nees; Microstrobilus Bremek.; Nilgirianthus Bremek.; Pachystrobilus Bremek.; Parachampionella Bremek.; Paragoldfussia Bremek.; Paragutzlaffia H.P.Tsui; Parastrobilanthes Bremek.; Parasympagis Bremek.; Perilepta Bremek.; Phlebophyllum Nees; Pleocaulus Bremek.; Psacadopaepale Bremek.; Pseudaechmanthera Bremek.; Pseudostenosiphonium Lindau; Pseudostonium Kuntze; Pteracanthus (Nees) Bremek.; Pteroptychia Bremek.; Pyrrothrix Bremek.; Semnostachya Bremek.; Semnothyrsus Bremek.; Sericocalyx Bremek.; Sinthroblastes Bremek.; Stenosiphonium Nees; Supushpa Suryan.; Sympagis (Nees) Bremek.; Taeniandra Bremek.; Tarphochlamys Bremek.; Tetraglochidium Bremek.; Tetragoga Bremek.; Tetragompha Bremek.; Thelepaepale Bremek.; Triaenacanthus Nees; Triaenanthus Nees; Xanthostachya Bremek.; Xenacanthus Bremek.

= Strobilanthes =

Genus of flowering plants

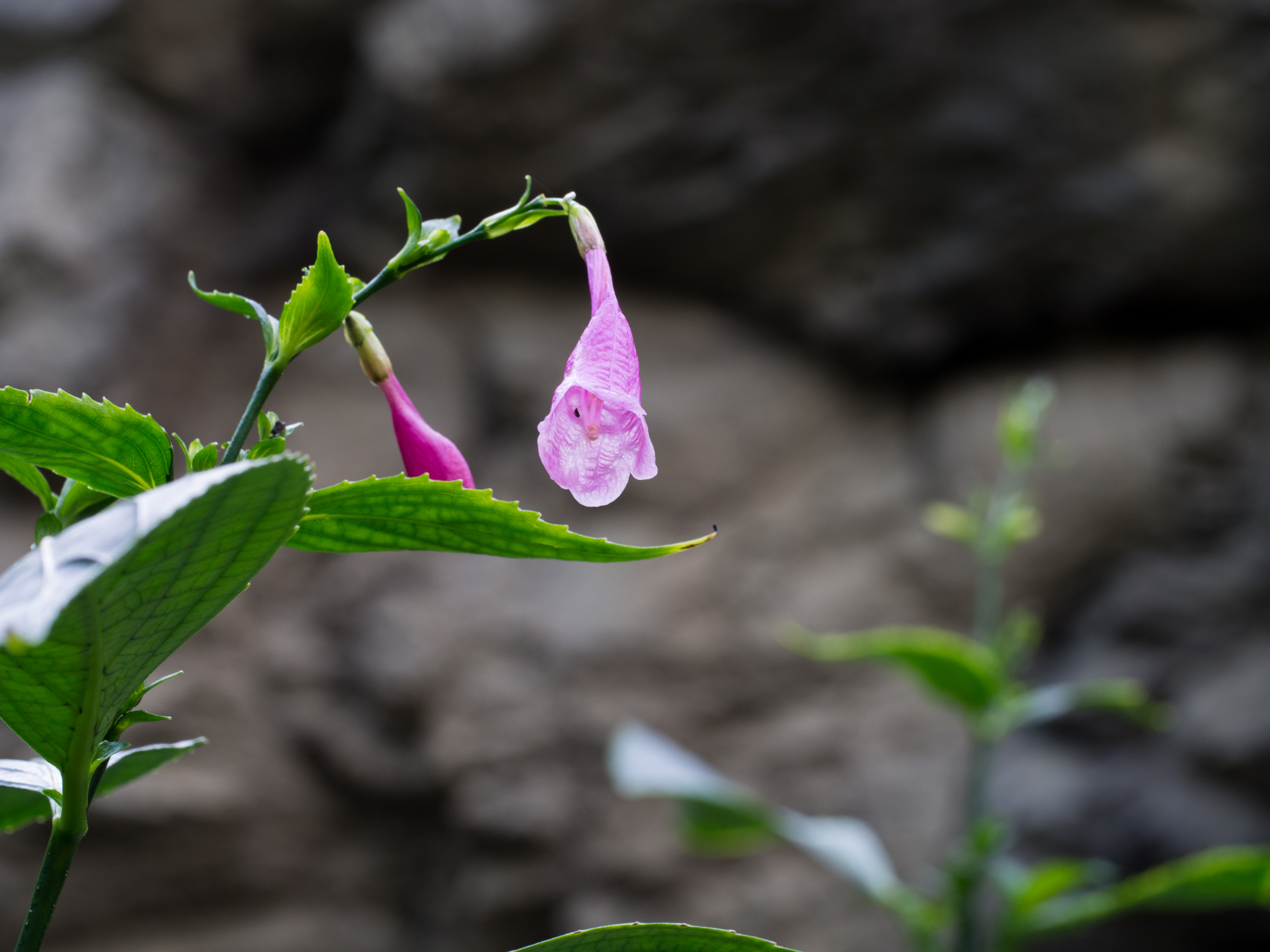
Strobilanthes cusia (Chinese rain bell)

Strobilanthes is a genus of about 350 species of flowering plants in the family Acanthaceae, mostly native to tropical Asia and Madagascar, but with a few species extending north into temperate regions of Asia. Many species are cultivated for their two-lipped, hooded flowers in shades of blue, pink, white and purple. Most are frost-tender and require protection in frost-prone areas. The genus is most famed for its many (but not all) species which bloom on long cycles of several years, such as Strobilanthes wightii which blooms every thirteen years.

== Species ==
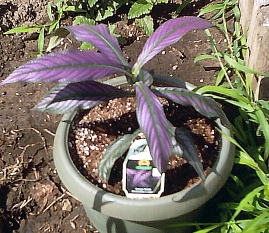
S. auriculata var. dyeriana (cultivated)

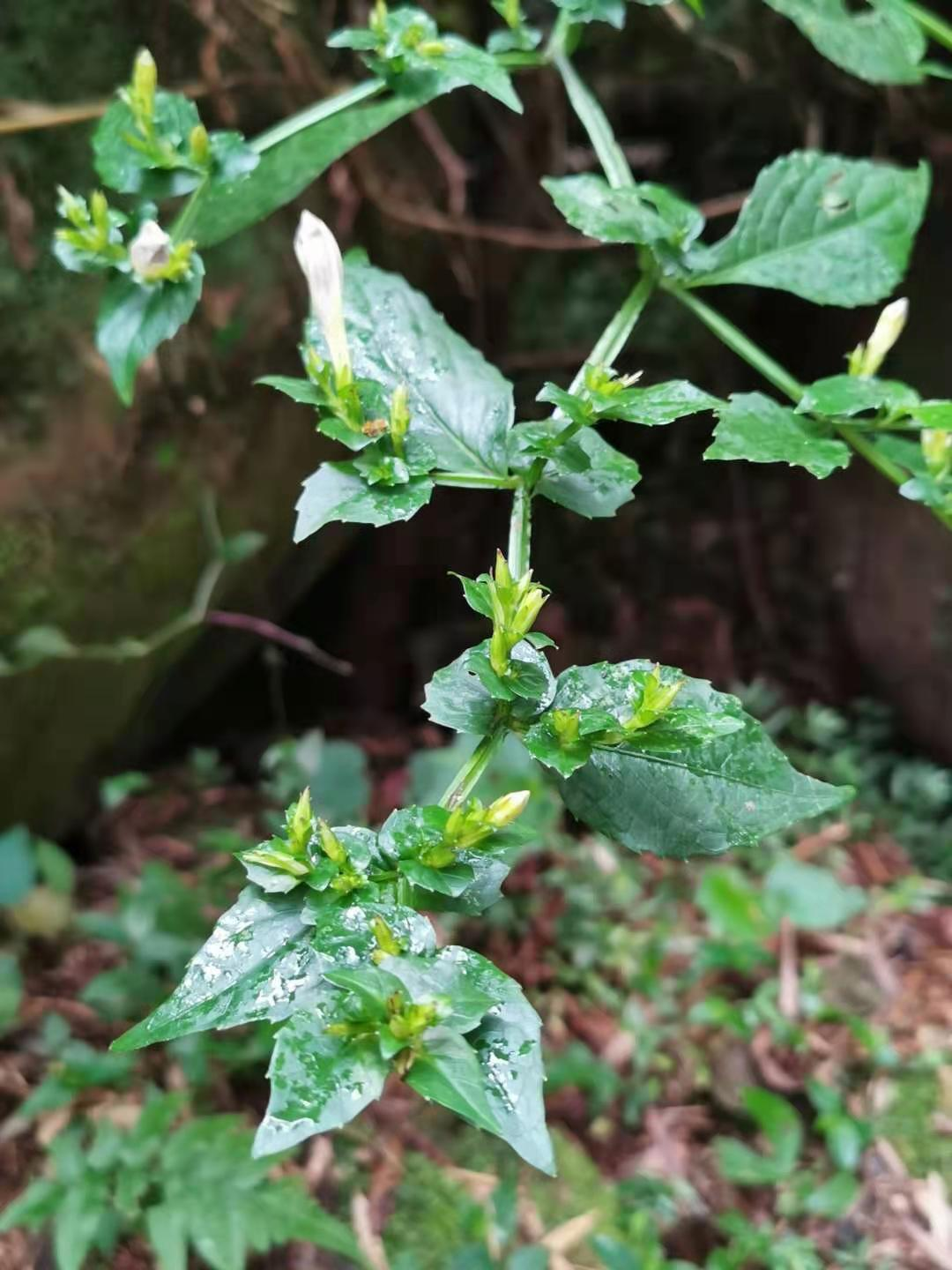
Strobilanthes flexicaulis, endemic to Taiwan

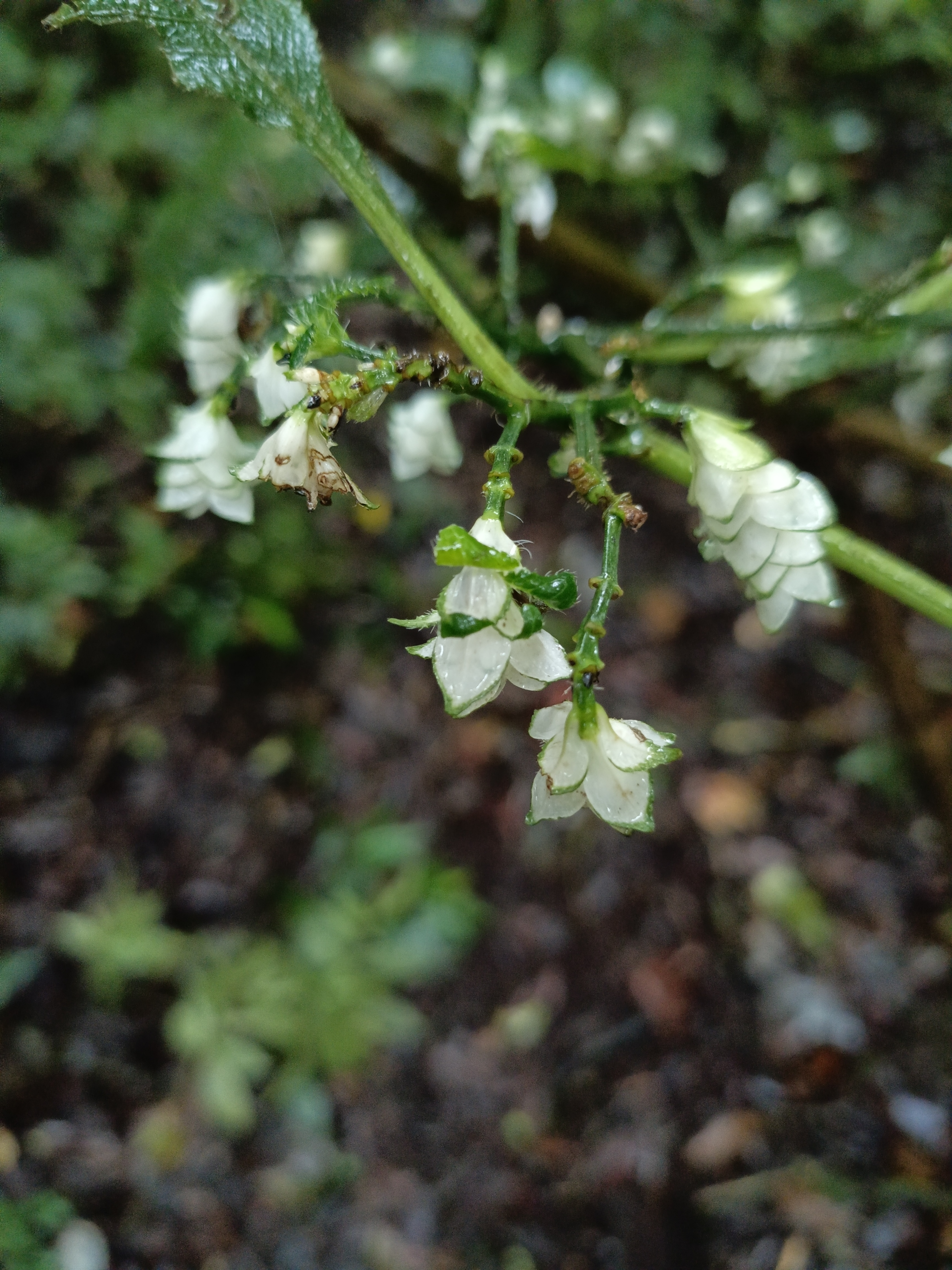
Strobilanthes cernua (bubukuan) in Papandayan Mountain, West Java, Indonesia

Strobilanthes atropurpurea is a temperate species, native to eastern Siberia; it is cultivated for its purple flowers.

Strobilanthes dyeriana (Persian shield) is a tropical plant native to Myanmar. It is grown for its dark green foliage with bright, metallic-purple stripes radiating outward from the central leaf vein. In proper conditions, it will also produce pale purple flowers. Persian Shield grows best outdoors in USDA zones 9 and 10, although it can survive in other zones as a houseplant given sufficient temperature, soil moisture and humidity. It has gained the Royal Horticultural Society's Award of Garden Merit.

Plants of the World Online currently includes:

- Strobilanthes abbreviata Y.F.Deng & J.R.I.Wood
- Strobilanthes accrescens J.R.I.Wood
- Strobilanthes adenophora Nees
- Strobilanthes adnata C.B.Clarke
- Strobilanthes adpressa J.R.I.Wood
- Strobilanthes afriastiniae J.R.Benn.
- Strobilanthes alata Blume
- Strobilanthes albostriata Ridl.
- Strobilanthes alboviridis J.B.Imlay
- Strobilanthes alternata (Burm.f.) Moylan ex J.R.I.Wood
- Strobilanthes amabilis C.B.Clarke
- Strobilanthes anamallaica J.R.I.Wood
- Strobilanthes anamitica Kuntze
- Strobilanthes anceps Nees
- Strobilanthes andamanensis Bor
- Strobilanthes andersonii Bedd.
- Strobilanthes angustifrons C.B.Clarke
- Strobilanthes anisophylla (Wall. ex Hook.) T.Anderson
- Strobilanthes antonii Elmer
- Strobilanthes apoensis (Elmer) Merr.
- Strobilanthes aprica (Hance) T.Anderson ex Benth.
- Strobilanthes arborea Span.
- Strobilanthes arenicola W.W.Sm.
- Strobilanthes argentea J.B.Imlay
- Strobilanthes arnottiana Nees
- Strobilanthes articulata J.B.Imlay
- Strobilanthes assimulata S.Moore
- Strobilanthes asymmetrica J.R.I.Wood & J.R.Benn.
- Strobilanthes atropurpurea Nees
- Strobilanthes atroviridis Y.F.Deng & J.R.I.Wood
- Strobilanthes attenuata (Wall. ex Nees) Jacq. ex Nees
- Strobilanthes auriculata Nees
  - S. auriculata var. dyeriana (Mast.) J.R.I.Wood = Strobilanthes dyeriana
- Strobilanthes aurita J.R.I.Wood
- Strobilanthes austrosinensis Y.F.Deng & J.R.I.Wood
- Strobilanthes autapomorpha J.R.Benn.
- Strobilanthes axilliflora C.B.Clarke ex S.Moore
- Strobilanthes backeri (Bremek.) J.R.Benn.
- Strobilanthes bakeri (Merr.) Y.F.Deng
- Strobilanthes bantonensis Lindau
- Strobilanthes baracatanensis (Elmer) Y.F.Deng
- Strobilanthes barbata Nees
- Strobilanthes barbigera J.R.I.Wood, Nuraliev & Scotland
- Strobilanthes barisanensis (Bremek.) J.R.I.Wood
- Strobilanthes bheriensis (Shakya) J.R.I.Wood
- Strobilanthes bibracteata Blume
- Strobilanthes bilabiata J.R.I.Wood
- Strobilanthes biocullata Y.F.Deng & J.R.I.Wood
- Strobilanthes bipartita Terao ex J.R.I.Wood
- Strobilanthes birmanica (Bremek.) W.J.Kress & DeFilipps
- Strobilanthes bislei Sinj.Thomas, B.Mani, Britto & Pradeep
- Strobilanthes blumeana (Nees) Y.F.Deng
- Strobilanthes bogoriensis Lindau
- Strobilanthes bolumpattiana Bedd.
- Strobilanthes bombycina J.B.Imlay
- Strobilanthes borii J.R.I.Wood
- Strobilanthes bracteata (Nees) J.R.I.Wood
- Strobilanthes brandisii T.Anderson
- Strobilanthes bremekampiana J.R.I.Wood & J.R.Benn.
- Strobilanthes brunelloides (Lam.) J.R.I.Wood
- Strobilanthes brunnescens Benoist
- Strobilanthes brunoniana Nees
- Strobilanthes bulusanensis Elmer
- Strobilanthes bunnemeyeri J.R.I.Wood
- Strobilanthes calcicola J.R.I.Wood & J.R.Benn.
- Strobilanthes callosa Nees
- Strobilanthes calvata J.R.I.Wood
- Strobilanthes calycina Nees
- Strobilanthes campaniformis J.R.I.Wood
- Strobilanthes campanulata Wight
- Strobilanthes canarica Bedd.
- Strobilanthes candida J.R.I.Wood
- Strobilanthes capillipes C.B.Clarke ex Ridl.
- Strobilanthes capitata (Nees) T.Anderson
- Strobilanthes carinei J.R.I.Wood
- Strobilanthes carnatica Carine, J.M.Alexander & Scotland
- Strobilanthes caudata T.Anderson
- Strobilanthes celebica (Bremek.) J.R.I.Wood
- Strobilanthes cernua Blume
- Strobilanthes chiangdaoensis Terao
- Strobilanthes chinensis (Nees) J.R.I.Wood & Y.F.Deng
- Strobilanthes chrysodelta J.R.I.Wood
- Strobilanthes ciliata Nees
- Strobilanthes cincinnalis C.B.Clarke
- Strobilanthes clarkei J.R.I.Wood
- Strobilanthes coertii Terao ex J.R.Benn.
- Strobilanthes cognata Benoist
- Strobilanthes collina Nees
- Strobilanthes compacta D.Fang & H.S.Lo
- Strobilanthes congesta Terao
- Strobilanthes connata Collett & Hemsl.
- Strobilanthes consanguinea (Nees) T.Anderson
- Strobilanthes cordifolia (Vahl) J.R.I.Wood
- Strobilanthes corrugata J.B.Imlay
- Strobilanthes crassifolia Miq.
- Strobilanthes crataegifolia T.Anderson
- Strobilanthes crispa (L.) Blume
- Strobilanthes crossandra (Steud.) J.R.I.Wood
- Strobilanthes cruciata (Bremek.) Terao
- Strobilanthes cumingiana (Nees) Y.F.Deng & J.R.I.Wood
- Strobilanthes cuneata (Shakya) J.R.I.Wood
- Strobilanthes cusia (Nees) Kuntze
- Strobilanthes cuspidata (Benth.) T.Anderson
- Strobilanthes cycla C.B.Clarke ex W.W.Sm.
- Strobilanthes cyphantha Diels
- Strobilanthes cystolithigera Lindau
- Strobilanthes dalzielii (W.W.Sm.) Benoist
- Strobilanthes decipiens J.R.I.Wood
- Strobilanthes decumbens (Bremek.) J.R.I.Wood
- Strobilanthes decurrens Nees
- Strobilanthes deflexa T.Anderson
- Strobilanthes densa Benoist
- Strobilanthes denticulata (Nees) T.Anderson
- Strobilanthes diandra (Nees) Alston
- Strobilanthes dimorphotricha Hance
- Strobilanthes discolor T.Anderson
- Strobilanthes disparifolia J.R.I.Wood
- Strobilanthes divaricata (Nees) T.Anderson
- Strobilanthes dolichophylla Benoist
- Strobilanthes dryadum Benoist
- Strobilanthes dupenii Bedd. ex C.B.Clarke
- Strobilanthes echinata Nees
- Strobilanthes elmeri Y.F.Deng
- Strobilanthes elongata C.B.Clarke
- Strobilanthes erecta C.B.Clarke
- Strobilanthes esquirolii H.Lév.
- Strobilanthes euantha J.R.I.Wood
- Strobilanthes exserta C.B.Clarke
- Strobilanthes extensa (Nees) Nees
- Strobilanthes falconeri T.Anderson
- Strobilanthes farinosa C.B.Clarke
- Strobilanthes fengiana Y.F.Deng & J.R.I.Wood
- Strobilanthes ferruginea D.Fang & H.S.Lo
- Strobilanthes filiformis Blume
- Strobilanthes fimbriata Nees
- Strobilanthes flava Kurz
- Strobilanthes flexa Benoist
- Strobilanthes flexicaulis Hayata
- Strobilanthes fluviatilis (C.B.Clarke ex W.W.Sm.) Moylan & Y.F.Deng
- Strobilanthes foliosa (Wight) T.Anderson
- Strobilanthes formosana S.Moore
- Strobilanthes forrestii Diels
- Strobilanthes fragrans J.R.I.Wood
- Strobilanthes frondosa J.R.I.Wood
- Strobilanthes fruticosa (Chatterjee) W.J.Kress & DeFilipps
- Strobilanthes fruticulosa (C.B.Clarke) Y.F.Deng
- Strobilanthes fusca J.R.I.Wood
- Strobilanthes galeopsis Stapf
- Strobilanthes gamblei Carine, J.M.Alexander & Scotland
- Strobilanthes gardneriana (Nees) T.Anderson
- Strobilanthes gigantodes Lindau
- Strobilanthes glabrata Nees
- Strobilanthes glandibracteata D.Fang & H.S.Lo
- Strobilanthes glandulosa Blume
- Strobilanthes glaucescens Nees
- Strobilanthes glomerata (Nees) T.Anderson
- Strobilanthes glutinosa Nees
- Strobilanthes gossypina T.Anderson
- Strobilanthes gracilis Bedd.
- Strobilanthes graminea J.B.Imlay
- Strobilanthes gregalis Collett & Hemsl.
- Strobilanthes guangxiensis S.Z.Huang
- Strobilanthes habracanthoides J.R.I.Wood
- Strobilanthes halconensis Merr.
- Strobilanthes hallbergii Blatt.
- Strobilanthes hamiltoniana (Steud.) Bosser & Heine
- Strobilanthes helferi T.Anderson
- Strobilanthes helicoides T.Anderson
- Strobilanthes helicta T.Anderson
- Strobilanthes heliophila J.R.I.Wood
- Strobilanthes henryi Hemsl.
- Strobilanthes heterochroa Hand.-Mazz.
- Strobilanthes heteroclita D.Fang & H.S.Lo
- Strobilanthes heteromalla T.Anderson ex C.B.Clarke
- Strobilanthes heyneana Nees
- Strobilanthes himalayana J.R.I.Wood
- Strobilanthes hirsuta Decne.
- Strobilanthes hirta (Vahl) Blume
- Strobilanthes hirticalyx Ridl.
- Strobilanthes hirtisepala C.B.Clarke
- Strobilanthes homotropa Nees
- Strobilanthes hongii Y.F.Deng & F.L.Chen
- Strobilanthes hookeri Nees
- Strobilanthes hossei C.B.Clarke
- Strobilanthes humilis (Nees) Gamble
- Strobilanthes hupehensis W.W.Sm.
- Strobilanthes hypericoides J.R.I.Wood
- Strobilanthes hypomalla Benoist
- Strobilanthes imbricata Nees
- Strobilanthes imlayae J.R.I.Wood
- Strobilanthes incisa J.B.Imlay
- Strobilanthes inflata T.Anderson
- Strobilanthes integrifolia (Dalzell) Kuntze
  - also Strobilanthes integrifolius
- Strobilanthes involucrata Blume
- Strobilanthes ixiocephala Benth.
- Strobilanthes japonica (Thunb.) Miq.
- Strobilanthes jennyae J.R.I.Wood
- Strobilanthes jeyporensis Bedd.
- Strobilanthes jogensis Gilli
- Strobilanthes jomyi P.Biju, Josekutty, Rekha & J.R.I.Wood
- Strobilanthes kachinensis J.R.I.Wood & J.R.Benn.
- Strobilanthes kannanii Josekutty, P.Biju, J.R.I.Wood & Augustine
- Strobilanthes karensium Kurz
- Strobilanthes khasyana T.Anderson
- Strobilanthes khoshooana (S.R.Paul) Karthik. & Moorthy
- Strobilanthes kingdonii J.R.I.Wood
- Strobilanthes kjellbergii J.R.I.Wood
- Strobilanthes klossii (S.Moore) Y.F.Deng
- Strobilanthes koordersii C.B.Clarke ex Koord.
- Strobilanthes korthalsii (Bremek.) J.R.I.Wood
- Strobilanthes kunthiana T.Anderson ex Benth.
- Strobilanthes labordei H.Lév.
- Strobilanthes lachenensis C.B.Clarke
- Strobilanthes lamiifolia (Nees) T.Anderson
- Strobilanthes lamioides T.Anderson
- Strobilanthes lamium C.B.Clarke ex W.W.Sm.
- Strobilanthes lanata Nees
- Strobilanthes lanceifolia T.Anderson
- Strobilanthes lanyuensis Seok, C.F.Hsieh & J.Murata
- Strobilanthes larium Hand.-Mazz.
- Strobilanthes latebrosa Ridl.
- Strobilanthes latibracteata J.B.Imlay
- Strobilanthes lawsonii Gamble
- Strobilanthes laxa T.Anderson
- Strobilanthes leucopogon Ridl.
- Strobilanthes lihengiae Y.F.Deng & J.R.I.Wood
- Strobilanthes linearifolia (Bremek.) Y.F.Deng
- Strobilanthes longespicata Hayata
- Strobilanthes longgangensis D.Fang & H.S.Lo
- Strobilanthes longiflora Benoist
- Strobilanthes longipedunculata Terao ex J.R.I.Wood
- Strobilanthes longipetiolata (Merr.) Y.F.Deng
- Strobilanthes longispica (H.P.Tsui) J.R.I.Wood & Y.F.Deng
- Strobilanthes longistaminea J.R.I.Wood
- Strobilanthes longzhouensis H.S.Lo & D.Fang
- Strobilanthes lupulina Nees
- Strobilanthes lurida Wight
- Strobilanthes maclellandii C.B.Clarke
- Strobilanthes maclurei Merr.
- Strobilanthes maculata (Wall.) Nees
- Strobilanthes maingayi C.B.Clarke
- Strobilanthes malabarica Josekutty, P.Biju & Augustine
- Strobilanthes mastersii T.Anderson
- Strobilanthes matthewiana Scotland
- Strobilanthes maxwellii J.R.I.Wood
- Strobilanthes mearnsii Merr.
- Strobilanthes medogensis (H.W.Li) J.R.I.Wood & Y.F.Deng
- Strobilanthes meeboldii Craib
- Strobilanthes mekongensis W.W.Sm.
- Strobilanthes membranacea Talbot
- Strobilanthes merrillii C.B.Clarke
- Strobilanthes micrantha Wight
- Strobilanthes microcarpa T.Anderson
- Strobilanthes microstachya Benth.
- Strobilanthes mogokensis Lace
- Strobilanthes monadelpha Nees
- Strobilanthes moschifera Blume
- Strobilanthes mucronatoproducta Lindau
- Strobilanthes mullayanagiriensis Sinj.Thomas, B.Mani, Britto & Pradeep
- Strobilanthes multangula Benoist
- Strobilanthes multidens C.B.Clarke
- Strobilanthes multiflora Ridl.
- Strobilanthes muratae J.R.I.Wood
- Strobilanthes murutorum J.R.I.Wood
- Strobilanthes myura Benoist
- Strobilanthes nagaensis (Bremek.) W.J.Kress & DeFilipps
- Strobilanthes namkadingensis Soulad. & Tagane
- Strobilanthes naumannii Engl.
- Strobilanthes neilgherrensis Bedd.
- Strobilanthes nemorosa Benoist
- Strobilanthes neoaspera Venu & P.Daniel
- Strobilanthes newii Bedd. ex C.B.Clarke
- Strobilanthes nigrescens T.Anderson
- Strobilanthes ningmingensis D.Fang & H.S.Lo
- Strobilanthes nobilis C.B.Clarke
- Strobilanthes nockii Trimen
- Strobilanthes novomegapolitana Lindau
- Strobilanthes nutans (Nees) T.Anderson
- Strobilanthes obesa Benoist
- Strobilanthes obtusibracteata Terao
- Strobilanthes oligantha Miq.
- Strobilanthes oligocephala T.Anderson ex C.B.Clarke
- Strobilanthes oresbia W.W.Sm.
- Strobilanthes orientalis J.R.I.Wood
- Strobilanthes orthostachya (Bremek.) J.R.I.Wood & J.R.Benn.
- Strobilanthes ovata Y.F.Deng & J.R.I.Wood
- Strobilanthes ovatibracteata H.S.Lo & D.Fang
- Strobilanthes ovatifolia (Bremek.) J.R.I.Wood
- Strobilanthes oxycalycina J.R.I.Wood
- Strobilanthes pachyphylla C.B.Clarke
- Strobilanthes pachys C.B.Clarke ex Merr.
- Strobilanthes palawanensis Elmer
- Strobilanthes panichanga (Nees) T.Anderson
- Strobilanthes paniculata (Nees) Miq.
- Strobilanthes paniculiformis J.R.I.Wood
- Strobilanthes papillosa T.Anderson
- Strobilanthes parabolica Nees
- Strobilanthes parryorum C.E.C.Fisch.
- Strobilanthes parvifolia J.R.I.Wood
- Strobilanthes pateriformis Lindau
- Strobilanthes patulus Benoist
- Strobilanthes pauciflora (Merr.) Y.F.Deng
- Strobilanthes pavala (Roxb.) J.R.I.Wood
- Strobilanthes pedicellata Ridl.
- Strobilanthes pedunculosa Miq.
- Strobilanthes pendula J.R.I.Wood & J.R.Benn.
- Strobilanthes peninsularis Terao
- Strobilanthes pentandra J.R.I.Wood
- Strobilanthes pentastemonoides (Nees) T.Anderson
  - also Strobilanthes penstemonoides
- Strobilanthes perplexa J.R.I.Wood
- Strobilanthes perrottetiana Nees
- Strobilanthes phoenicea Ridl.
- Strobilanthes phyllocephala J.R.I.Wood & Scotland
- Strobilanthes phyllostachya Kurz
- Strobilanthes pinetorum W.W.Sm.
- Strobilanthes pluriformis C.B.Clarke
- Strobilanthes poilanei Benoist
- Strobilanthes polybotrya Miq.
- Strobilanthes polyneuros C.B.Clarke ex W.W.Sm.
- Strobilanthes polystachya Benoist
- Strobilanthes polythrix T.Anderson
- Strobilanthes pothigaiensis Gopalan & Chithra
- Strobilanthes procumbens Y.F.Deng & J.R.I.Wood
- Strobilanthes pseudocollina K.J.He & D.H.Qin
- Strobilanthes pteroclada Benoist
- Strobilanthes pterygorrhachis C.B.Clarke
- Strobilanthes pubescens (Bremek.) J.R.I.Wood
- Strobilanthes pubiflora J.R.I.Wood
- Strobilanthes pulcherrima T.Anderson
- Strobilanthes pulneyensis C.B.Clarke
- Strobilanthes punctata Nees
- Strobilanthes pusilla J.R.I.Wood
- Strobilanthes quadrifaria (Wall. ex Nees) Y.F.Deng
- Strobilanthes ramulosa J.R.I.Wood
- Strobilanthes rankanensis Hayata
- Strobilanthes ranongensis Terao
- Strobilanthes recurva C.B.Clarke
- Strobilanthes remota T.Anderson
- Strobilanthes renschiae (Bremek.) J.R.I.Wood & J.R.Benn.
- Strobilanthes repanda (Blume) J.R.Benn.
- Strobilanthes reptans (G.Forst.) Moylan ex Y.F.Deng & J.R.I.Wood
- Strobilanthes reticulata Stapf
- Strobilanthes retusa D.Fang
- Strobilanthes rhamnifolia (Nees) T.Anderson
- Strobilanthes rhombifolia C.B.Clarke
- Strobilanthes rhytiphylla (Nees) Y.F.Deng
- Strobilanthes rhytisperma C.B.Clarke
- Strobilanthes ridleyi Merr.
- Strobilanthes rivularis J.R.I.Wood & J.R.Benn.
- Strobilanthes rosea Nees
- Strobilanthes rostrata Y.F.Deng & J.R.I.Wood
- Strobilanthes rubescens T.Anderson
- Strobilanthes rubicunda (Nees) T.Anderson
- Strobilanthes rufescens (Roth) T.Anderson
- Strobilanthes ruficapillis Ridl.
- Strobilanthes ruficaulis Ridl.
- Strobilanthes rufocapitata C.B.Clarke
- Strobilanthes rufopauper C.B.Clarke
- Strobilanthes rufosepalus C.B.Clarke
- Strobilanthes rufostrobilata C.B.Clarke
- Strobilanthes sabiniana (Wall. ex Lindl.) Nees
- Strobilanthes saccata J.R.I.Wood
- Strobilanthes sainthomiana Augustine, Josekutty & P.Biju
- Strobilanthes saltiensis S.Moore
- Strobilanthes sanjappae Karthik. & Moorthy
- Strobilanthes sarcorrhiza (C.Ling) C.Z.Zheng ex Y.F.Deng & N.H.Xia
- Strobilanthes sarmentosa Benoist
- Strobilanthes scabra Nees
- Strobilanthes scabrida Ridl.
- Strobilanthes schomburgkii (Craib) J.R.I.Wood
- Strobilanthes scrobiculata Dalzell ex C.B.Clarke
- Strobilanthes secunda T.Anderson
- Strobilanthes serrata J.B.Imlay
- Strobilanthes sessilis Nees
- Strobilanthes setosa J.R.I.Wood
- Strobilanthes sexennis Nees
- Strobilanthes shanensis (Bremek.) J.R.I.Wood
- Strobilanthes simonsii T.Anderson
- Strobilanthes simplex J.R.I.Wood
- Strobilanthes sinica (H.S.Lo) Y.F.Deng
- Strobilanthes sinuata J.R.I.Wood
- Strobilanthes speciosa Blume
- Strobilanthes spicata T.Anderson
- Strobilanthes spiciformis Y.F.Deng & J.R.I.Wood
- Strobilanthes squalens S.Moore
- Strobilanthes steenisiana J.R.Benn.
- Strobilanthes stenodon C.B.Clarke
- Strobilanthes stenura (Bremek.) J.R.Benn.
- Strobilanthes stolonifera Benoist
- Strobilanthes straminea W.W.Sm.
- Strobilanthes strigosa D.Fang & H.S.Lo
- Strobilanthes suborbicularis J.B.Imlay
- Strobilanthes sulawesiana J.R.I.Wood
- Strobilanthes sulfurea Benoist
- Strobilanthes sumatrana Miq.
- Strobilanthes sylvestris Ridl.
- Strobilanthes szechuanica (Batalin) J.R.I.Wood & Y.F.Deng
- Strobilanthes tamburensis C.B.Clarke
- Strobilanthes tanakae J.R.I.Wood
- Strobilanthes taoana Y.F.Deng & J.R.I.Wood
- Strobilanthes tenax Dunn
- Strobilanthes tenuiflora J.R.I.Wood
- Strobilanthes teraoi J.R.I.Wood & J.R.Benn.
- Strobilanthes tetrasperma (Champ.) Druce
- Strobilanthes thomsonii T.Anderson
- Strobilanthes thwaitesii T.Anderson
- Strobilanthes tibetica J.R.I.Wood
- Strobilanthes timorensis Nees
- Strobilanthes tomentosa (Nees) J.R.I.Wood
- Strobilanthes tonkinensis Lindau
- Strobilanthes torrentium Benoist
- Strobilanthes trichantha J.R.I.Wood
- Strobilanthes tricostata Sinj.Thomas, B.Mani, Britto & Pradeep
- Strobilanthes tristis (Wight) T.Anderson
- Strobilanthes truncata D.Fang & H.S.Lo
- Strobilanthes tubiflos (C.B.Clarke) J.R.I.Wood
- Strobilanthes twangensis J.R.I.Wood & D.Borah
- Strobilanthes unilateralis J.R.I.Wood
- Strobilanthes urceolaris Gamble
- Strobilanthes urens (Roth) J.R.I.Wood
- Strobilanthes urophylla (Nees) Nees
- Strobilanthes vallicola Y.F.Deng & J.R.I.Wood
- Strobilanthes venosa (C.B.Clarke) J.R.I.Wood
- Strobilanthes verruculosa Nees
- Strobilanthes versicolor Diels
- Strobilanthes vestita Nees
- Strobilanthes violacea Bedd.
- Strobilanthes violascens Ridl.
- Strobilanthes violifolia T.Anderson
- Strobilanthes virendrakumariana Venu & P.Daniel
- Strobilanthes viridis (Merr.) Y.F.Deng
- Strobilanthes viscosa (Arn. ex Nees) T.Anderson
- Strobilanthes wakasana Wakas. & Naruh.
- Strobilanthes walkeri Arn. ex Nees
- Strobilanthes wallichii Nees
- Strobilanthes wangiana Y.F.Deng & J.R.I.Wood
- Strobilanthes warburgii Terao ex J.R.Benn.
- Strobilanthes wardiana J.R.I.Wood
- Strobilanthes wightiana Nees
- Strobilanthes wightii (Bremek.) J.R.I.Wood
- Strobilanthes willisii Carine
- Strobilanthes wilsonii J.R.I.Wood & Y.F.Deng
- Strobilanthes winckelii (Bremek.) J.R.Benn.
- Strobilanthes xanthosticta C.B.Clarke
- Strobilanthes yunnanensis Diels
- Strobilanthes zenkeriana (Nees) T.Anderson
- Strobilanthes zeylanica T.Anderson
- Strobilanthes zwickeyae (Moylan) Y.F.Deng

== Herbivory ==
Strobilanthes species are food plants for the larvae of some Lepidoptera species including Endoclita malabaracus, which has been recorded on S. callosa.
