= Dimorphandra wilsonii =

Conservation status
- Critically Endangered (IUCN 3.1)

Scientific classification
- Kingdom: Plantae
- Clade: Tracheophytes
- Clade: Angiosperms
- Clade: Eudicots
- Clade: Rosids
- Order: Fabales
- Family: Fabaceae
- Subfamily: Caesalpinioideae
- Genus: Dimorphandra
- Species: D. wilsonii

Binomial name
- Dimorphandra wilsonii Rizzini

Species of legume

Dimorphandra wilsonii (Common name: Faveiro de Wilson) is a tree species of legume of the family Fabaceae. It is found only in the Minas Gerais state of south-east Brazil, in regions close to the city of Belo Horizonte. Its natural habitat is moist savanna, called Cerrado, in areas of transition of Atlantic Forest. Due to habitat loss, it is critically threatened. Its population is fragmented and seriously reduced, with less than two dozen known individuals.

The Botanic Garden of Belo Horizonte (Jardim Botânico de Belo Horizonte) (FZB-BH) and Federal University of Minas Gerais (UFMG) has coordinated a multi-discipline effort towards the study and conservation of this species, including the search for new individuals and populations.

Genetics, phenology, cultivation and physiology of this tree have been studied, but further research is necessary. Moreover, investment in preservation of existing populations, the reintroduction of the species and the restoration of its habitat is imperative. To promote these efforts, the Botanic Garden, UFMG and the Society of Friends of the Zoo-Botanical Foundation are seeking sponsors.

Notably, a genetic study suggested in 2020 that instead of being a true species, D. wilsonii is the result of recurrent interspecific hybridization between two Dimorphandra species, D. mollis from the cerrado and the threatened D. exaltata from the Atlantic forest, raising new prospects on the strategy suited for its conservation and management.

== Sources ==
- Fernandes, F. M.; Fonseca, A. G.; Kaehele, K; Goulart, M. F., Marinho, W.; Souza, H A.V; Queiroz, A. R.; Giorni, V.; Oliveira, G.; Rodrigues, M. J.; Bacelar, M.; Lovato, M. B. 2007. Tentando evitar mais uma extinção: o caso do "Faveiro de Wilson" (Dimorphandra wilsonii Rizzini). In: Recuperando o verde para as cidades: an experiência dos jardins botânicos brasileiros (T. S. Pereira, M. L. M. N. Costa e P. W. Orgs.). Rio de Janeiro: Rede Brasileira de Jardins Botânicos; Instituto de Pesquisas Jardim Botânico do Rio de Janeiro; BGCI. p. 87-98. This article is available at https://web.archive.org/web/20130508024615/http://amigosdazoobotanica.org.br/
- Dimorphandra wilsonii
- 2006 IUCN Red List of Threatened Species.
- Fonseca, M. B.; França, M. G. C.; Zonta, E.; Giorni, V. 2010. Early growth of Dimorphandra wilsonii (Fabaceae, Caesalpinioideae) under different fertility conditions in cerrado soil. Acta Botanica Brasilica, 24: 322–327.
- Fonseca, M. B.; Peix, A.; Faria, S. M.; Mateos, P. F.; Rivera, L. P.; Simões-Araújo, J.; França, M. G. C.; Isaias, R. M. S.; Cruz, C.; Velazquez, E.; Scotti, M. R.; Sprent, J. I.; James, E. K. 2012. Nodulation in Dimorphandra wilsonii Rizz. (Caesalpinioideae), a threatened species native to the Brazilian Cerrado. PLoS One 7(11): e49520. doi:10.1371/journal.pone.0049520
