= Sympetalandra schmutzii =

Conservation status
- Vulnerable (IUCN 2.3)

Scientific classification
- Kingdom: Plantae
- Clade: Tracheophytes
- Clade: Angiosperms
- Clade: Eudicots
- Clade: Rosids
- Order: Fabales
- Family: Fabaceae
- Subfamily: Caesalpinioideae
- Genus: Sympetalandra
- Species: S. schmutzii

Binomial name
- Sympetalandra schmutzii Steen.

Species of legume

Sympetalandra schmutzii is a species of legume in the family Fabaceae. It is found only on Flores in Indonesia.
