= Bussea eggelingii =

Conservation status
- Endangered (IUCN 2.3)

Scientific classification
- Kingdom: Plantae
- Clade: Tracheophytes
- Clade: Angiosperms
- Clade: Eudicots
- Clade: Rosids
- Order: Fabales
- Family: Fabaceae
- Subfamily: Caesalpinioideae
- Genus: Bussea
- Species: B. eggelingii

Binomial name
- Bussea eggelingii Verdc.

Species of legume

Bussea eggelingii is a species of legume in the family Fabaceae. It is found only in Tanzania. It is threatened by habitat loss.
