= Moldenhawer =

Moldenhawer may refer to:

- Johann Jacob Paul Moldenhawer (1766–1827). German botanist.
- Daniel Gotthilf Moldenhawer (1753–1823). German-Danish philologist, theologian and librarian.
