= Tachigali pilgeriana =

Conservation status
- Endangered (IUCN 2.3)

Scientific classification
- Kingdom: Plantae
- Clade: Tracheophytes
- Clade: Angiosperms
- Clade: Eudicots
- Clade: Rosids
- Order: Fabales
- Family: Fabaceae
- Subfamily: Caesalpinioideae
- Genus: Tachigali
- Species: T. pilgeriana

Binomial name
- Tachigali pilgeriana (Harms) Oliveira-Filho

Synonyms
- Sclerolobium pilgerianum Harms; Sclerolobium striatum Dwyer

Species of legume

Tachigali pilgeriana, synonym Sclerolobium pilgerianum, is a species of legume in the family Fabaceae. It is endemic to Brazil.

== Conservation ==
Tachigali pilgeriana was assessed as "endangered" in 1998 for the IUCN Red List, initially under the synonym Sclerolobium pilgerianum. Separately, Sclerolobium striatum was assessed as "vulnerable", but is now regarded as a synonym of T. pilgeriana.
