= Acapu =

Acapu is a common name of Tupi origin for several timber-producing South American trees and may refer to:

- Andira
- Clathrotropsis nitida
- Vouacapoua americana, found in Brazil, French Guiana, Guyana, and Suriname
