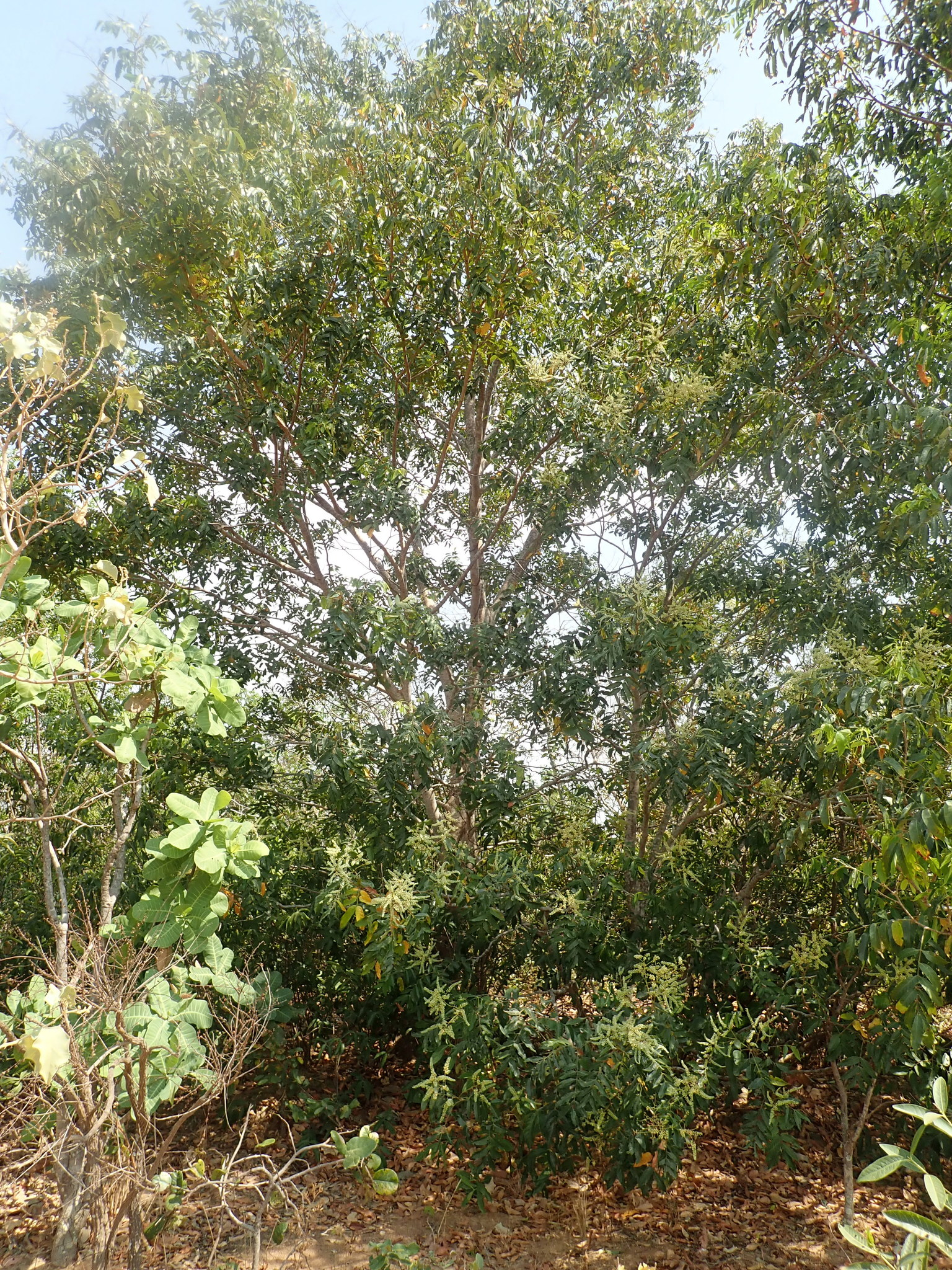

Conservation status
- Least Concern (IUCN 3.1)

Scientific classification
- Kingdom: Plantae
- Clade: Tracheophytes
- Clade: Angiosperms
- Clade: Eudicots
- Clade: Rosids
- Order: Fabales
- Family: Fabaceae
- Subfamily: Caesalpinioideae
- Genus: Tachigali
- Species: T. vulgaris

Binomial name
- Tachigali vulgaris L.F.Gomes da Silva & H.C.Lima

= Tachigali vulgaris =

Species of tree

Tachigali vulgaris is a tree species native to South America, predominantly found in the Amazon region and Brazilian Cerrado. It belongs to the Fabaceae family and exhibits nitrogen fixation through bacteria of the Rhizobium genus. Its wood displays annual growth rings, which is uncommon for species in tropical regions. Currently, the species is being studied for use in forest plantations and the regeneration of degraded areas.

The Tachi or carvoeiro, as it is commonly called, is a pioneering species with rapid growth and few nutritional requirements, adapted to nutrient-poor soils and hot climates.
