= Bussea gossweileri =

Scientific classification
- Kingdom: Plantae
- Clade: Tracheophytes
- Clade: Angiosperms
- Clade: Eudicots
- Clade: Rosids
- Order: Fabales
- Family: Fabaceae
- Subfamily: Caesalpinioideae
- Genus: Bussea
- Species: B. gossweileri

Binomial name
- Bussea gossweileri Baker f.

Species of legume

Bussea gossweileri is a species of legume in the family Fabaceae in the genus Bussea. It is found in Angola and Zaire.
