= Suicide tree =

Suicide tree may refer to at least two different plant species:

- Cerbera odollam (native to India) so called because it is toxic
- Tachigali versicolor (native to Central America) so called because it reproduces once before dying
