= Tachigali tessmannii =

Conservation status
- Data Deficient (IUCN 2.3)

Scientific classification
- Kingdom: Plantae
- Clade: Tracheophytes
- Clade: Angiosperms
- Clade: Eudicots
- Clade: Rosids
- Order: Fabales
- Family: Fabaceae
- Subfamily: Caesalpinioideae
- Genus: Tachigali
- Species: T. tessmannii

Binomial name
- Tachigali tessmannii Harms

Species of plant

Tachigali tessmannii is a species of leguminous species of tree in the family Fabaceae. It is found only in Peru.
