= Tachigali beaurepairei =

Conservation status
- Endangered (IUCN 2.3)

Scientific classification
- Kingdom: Plantae
- Clade: Tracheophytes
- Clade: Angiosperms
- Clade: Eudicots
- Clade: Rosids
- Order: Fabales
- Family: Fabaceae
- Subfamily: Caesalpinioideae
- Genus: Tachigali
- Species: T. beaurepairei

Binomial name
- Tachigali beaurepairei (Harms) L.F.Gomes da Silva & H.C.Lima

Synonyms
- Sclerolobium beaurepairei Harms

Species of legume

Tachigali beaurepairei, synonym Sclerolobium beaurepairei, is a species of legume in the family Fabaceae. It is endemic to Brazil.
