= Bussea xylocarpa =

Conservation status
- Vulnerable (IUCN 3.1)

Scientific classification
- Kingdom: Plantae
- Clade: Tracheophytes
- Clade: Angiosperms
- Clade: Eudicots
- Clade: Rosids
- Order: Fabales
- Family: Fabaceae
- Subfamily: Caesalpinioideae
- Genus: Bussea
- Species: B. xylocarpa

Binomial name
- Bussea xylocarpa (Sprague) Sprague & Craib

Species of legume

Bussea xylocarpa is a species of legume in the family Fabaceae. It is found only in Mozambique. It is threatened by habitat loss.
