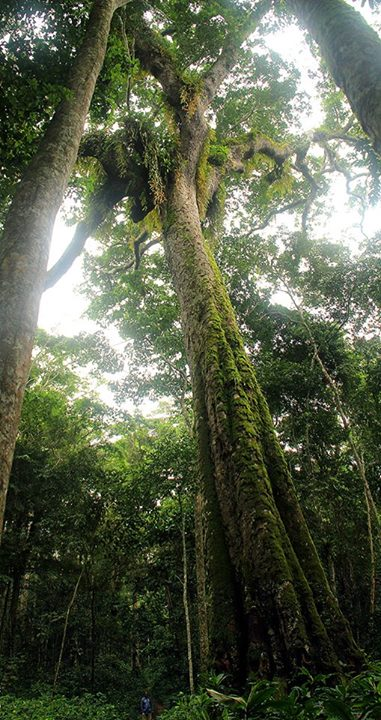
- A specimen of P. tessmannii from Yangambi, Democratic Republic of the Congo that is locally known as l'arbre de l'authenticité where tribal elders held court

Scientific classification
- Kingdom: Plantae
- Clade: Tracheophytes
- Clade: Angiosperms
- Clade: Eudicots
- Clade: Rosids
- Order: Fabales
- Family: Fabaceae
- Subfamily: Caesalpinioideae
- Genus: Pachyelasma; Harms 1913
- Species: P. tessmannii

Binomial name
- Pachyelasma tessmannii (Harms) Harms 1913

Synonyms
- Stachyothyrsus tessmannii Harms 1910

= Pachyelasma =

Genus of legumes

Pachyelasma is a genus of flowering plants in the legume subfamily Caesalpinioideae. It contains only one species, Pachyelasma tessmannii, which is native to central Africa.

== Description ==
Pachyelasma tessmannii is an evergreen tree growing up to 60 m (200 ft) tall with a straight, cylindrical trunk up to 2.5 m (8 ft 2 in) in diameter. The flowers are red and the fruits are four-angled black pods that may be up to 37 cm (15 in) in length.

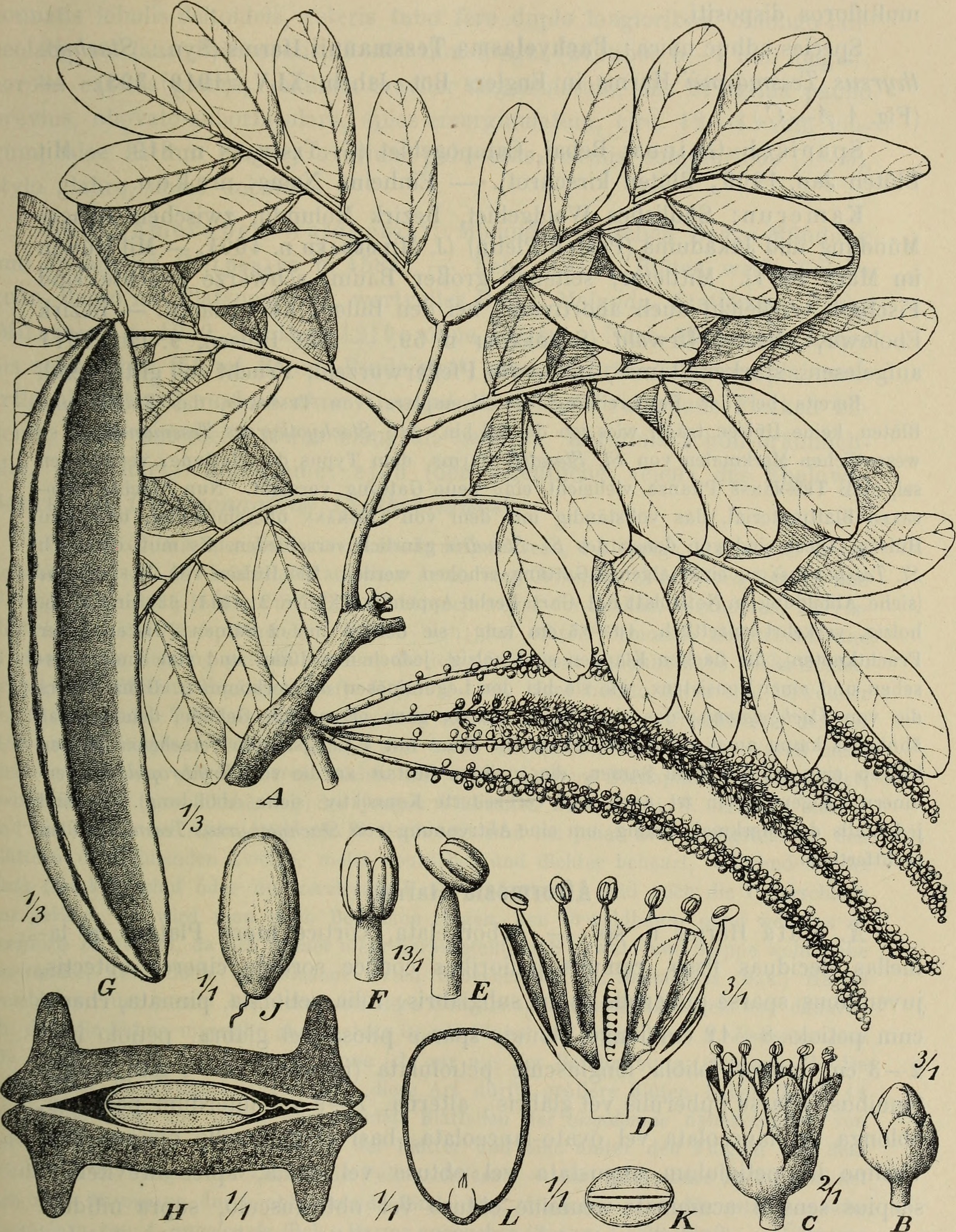
Fig. i. Pachyelasma tessmannii. A flowering branch, B bud, C flower, D flower in longitudinal section, F stamens, G pod, H pod in cross section, J seed, K seed in cross section, L seed in longitudinal section

== Distribution and habitat ==
Pachyelasma tessmannii can be found in the wet tropical regions of Cameroon, the Central African Republic, the Republic of the Congo, the Democratic Republic of the Congo, Gabon, and Nigeria.

== Uses ==
The fruit is sometimes used by fishermen in remote areas of Cameroon and the Democratic Republic of Congo for poison fishing. Some cocoa farmers in Cameroon mix the bark with other plant materials and extracts to create a natural pesticide.
