= Tachigali hypoleuca =

Scientific classification
- Kingdom: Plantae
- Clade: Tracheophytes
- Clade: Angiosperms
- Clade: Eudicots
- Clade: Rosids
- Order: Fabales
- Family: Fabaceae
- Subfamily: Caesalpinioideae
- Genus: Tachigali
- Species: T. hypoleuca

Binomial name
- Tachigali hypoleuca (Benth.) Zarucchi & Herend.

Synonyms
- Sclerolobium hypoleucum Benth.

Species of legume

Tachigali hypoleuca, synonym Sclerolobium hypoleucum, is a species of tree in the family Fabaceae. It is native to Bolivia and north Brazil. As with other members of the genus Tachigali, this species is vulnerable due to indiscriminate logging for construction and craft wood. Its popularity is due to the wood being dense and heavy, making it durable for outdoor use. Propagation is by seed. The tree reaches 20 metres (66 ft) in height and up to 70 centimetres (28 in) in diameter at breast height.
