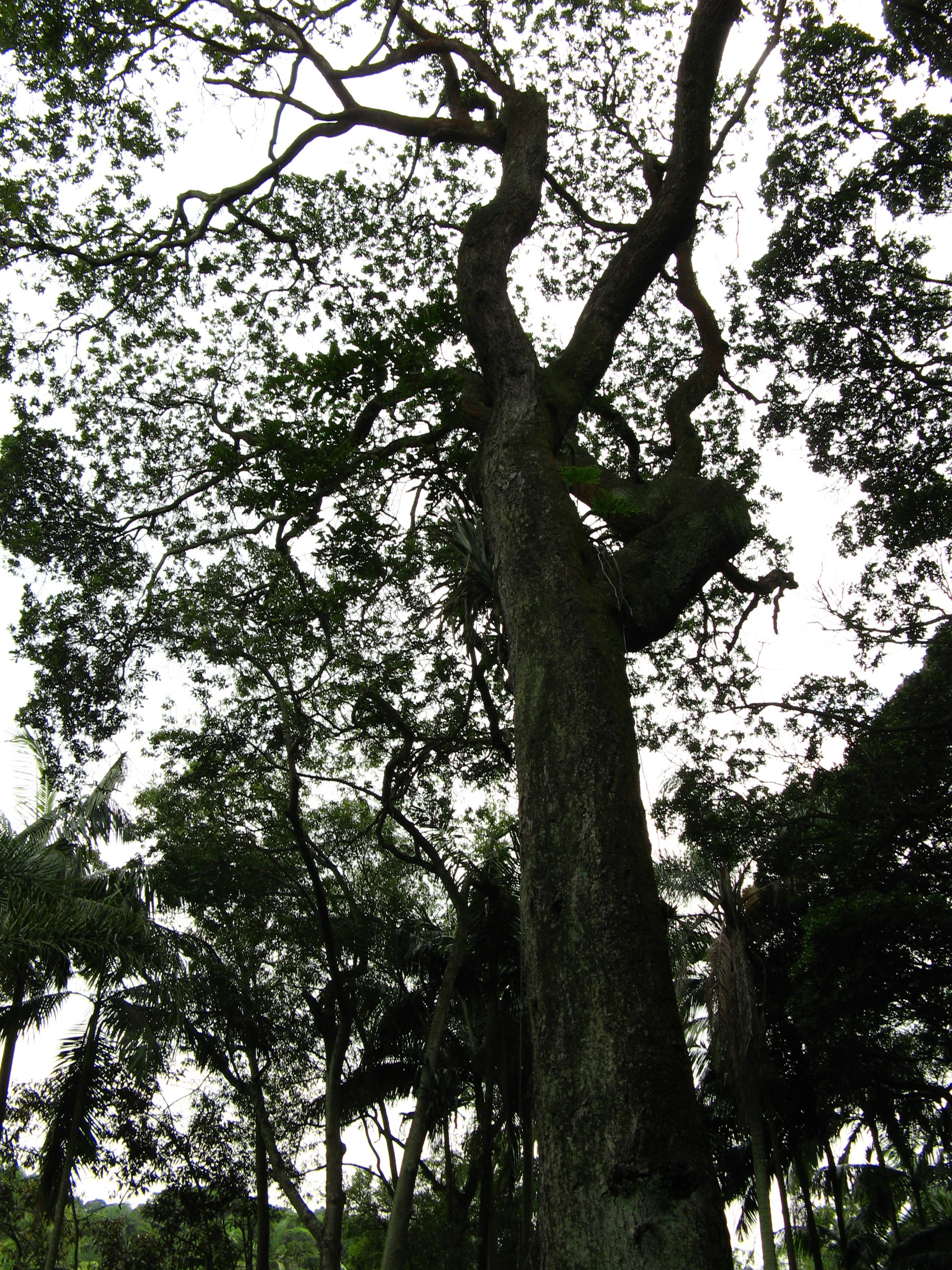

Conservation status
- Near Threatened (IUCN 2.3)

Scientific classification
- Kingdom: Plantae
- Clade: Tracheophytes
- Clade: Angiosperms
- Clade: Eudicots
- Clade: Rosids
- Order: Fabales
- Family: Fabaceae
- Subfamily: Caesalpinioideae
- Genus: Tachigali
- Species: T. denudata

Binomial name
- Tachigali denudata (Vogel) Oliveira-Filho

Synonyms
- Sclerolobium denudatum Vogel; Sclerolobium glaziovii Taub.

= Tachigali denudata =

Species of legume

Tachigali denudata, synonym Sclerolobium denudatum, is a species of legume in the family Fabaceae. It is found only in Brazil.
