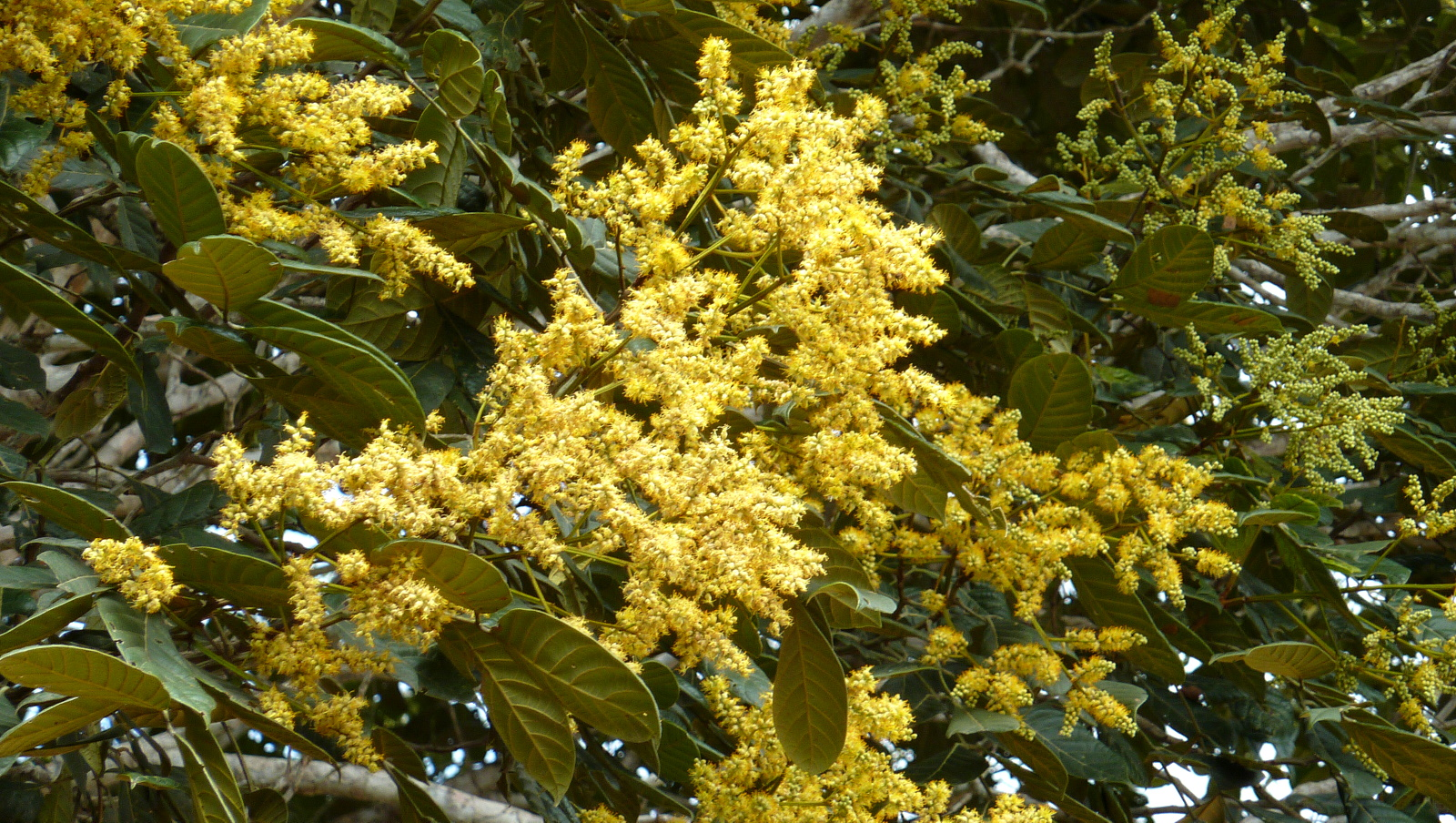
- Flowering Tachigali densiflora

Conservation status
- Near Threatened (IUCN 2.3)

Scientific classification
- Kingdom: Plantae
- Clade: Tracheophytes
- Clade: Angiosperms
- Clade: Eudicots
- Clade: Rosids
- Order: Fabales
- Family: Fabaceae
- Subfamily: Caesalpinioideae
- Genus: Tachigali
- Species: T. densiflora

Binomial name
- Tachigali densiflora (Benth.) L.F.Gomes da Silva & H.C.Lima

Synonyms
- Sclerolobium densiflorum Benth.

= Tachigali densiflora =

Species of legume

Tachigali densiflora, synonym Sclerolobium densiflorum, is a species of flowering plant in the family Fabaceae. It is found only in the Alagoas, Bahia, and Pernambuco states of Brazil. T. densiflora has recently suffered from severe habitat declines and is ranked near threatened by the IUCN.
