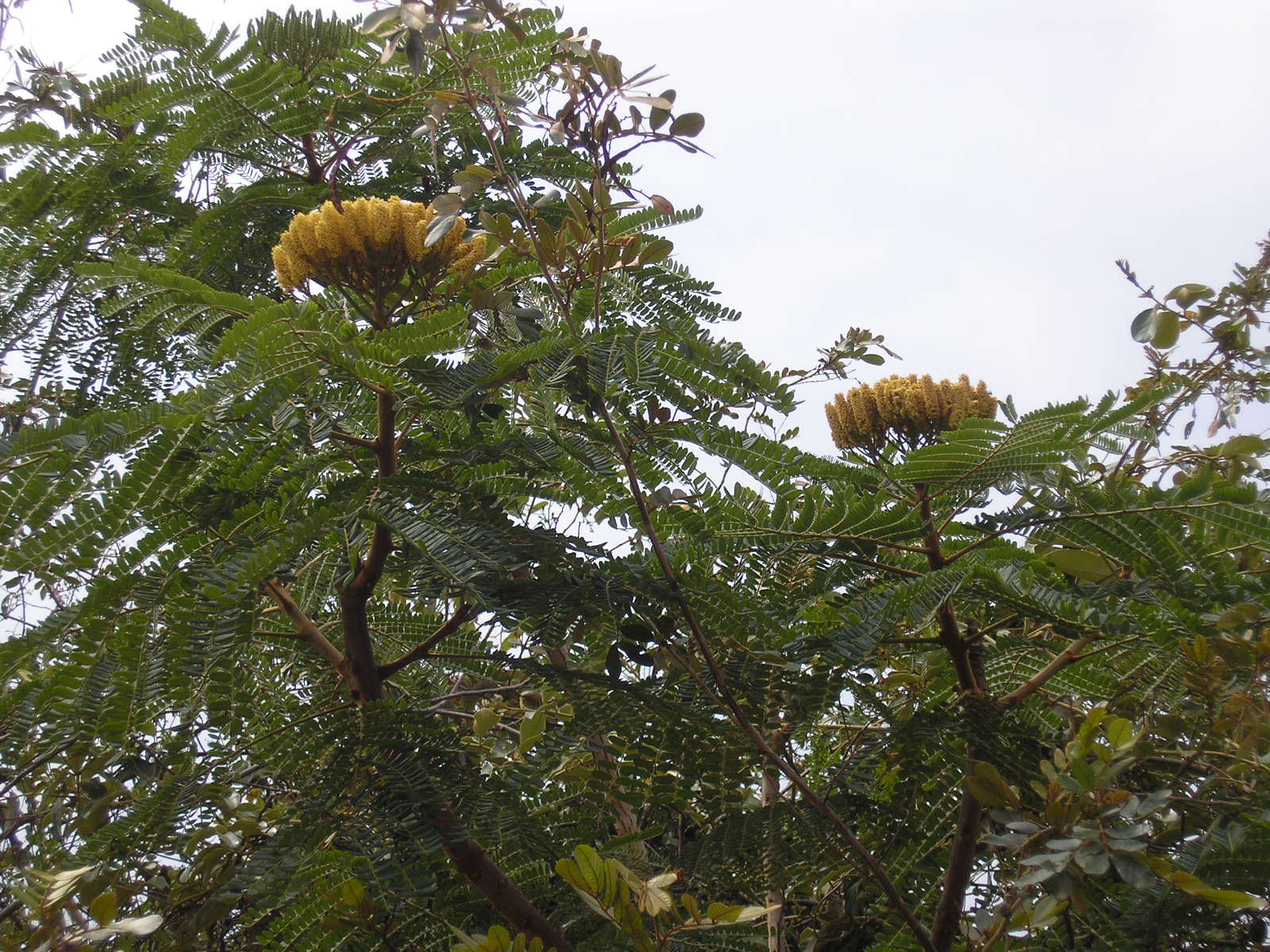
- Dimorphandra mollis

Scientific classification
- Kingdom: Plantae
- Clade: Embryophytes
- Clade: Tracheophytes
- Clade: Spermatophytes
- Clade: Angiosperms
- Clade: Eudicots
- Clade: Rosids
- Order: Fabales
- Family: Fabaceae
- Subfamily: Caesalpinioideae
- Genus: Dimorphandra; Schott (1827)

Type species
- Dimorphandra exaltata Schott

Species
- 26; see text

= Dimorphandra =

Genus of legumes

Dimorphandra is a genus of legume in the family Fabaceae, subfamily Caesalpinioideae. It includes 26 species native to northern South America, ranging from Colombia and Venezuela to Bolivia, Paraguay, and southeastern Brazil.

== Accepted Species ==
Dimorphandra comprises the following subgenera and species:

- Subgenus Dimorphandra Tul. 1844
  - Dimorphandra caudata Ducke 1925
  - Dimorphandra exaltata^{†} Schott 1827
  - Dimorphandra gardneriana Tulasne 1844
  - Dimorphandra jorgei M. Freitas da Silva 1981
  - Dimorphandra loretensis M. Freitas da Silva 1981
  - Dimorphandra mediocris Ducke 1938
  - Dimorphandra mollis Benth. 1840
  - Dimorphandra multiflora Ducke 1922
  - Dimorphandra parviflora Spruce ex Benth 1870
  - Dimorphandra pullei Amshoff 1939
  - Dimorphandra wilsonii Rizzini 1969
- Subgenus Phaneropsia Arch. 1844
  - Dimorphandra conjugata^{†} (Splitg.) Sandwith 1932
  - Dimorphandra davisii Sprague & Sandwith 1932
  - Dimorphandra disimillis Cowan 1961
  - Dimorphandra unijuga Tulasne 1844
  - Dimorphandra williamii M. F. da Silva, 1981
- Subgenus Pocillum Tul. 1844
  - Dimorphandra campinarum Ducke 1925
  - Dimorphandra coccinea Ducke 1953
  - Dimorphandra cuprea Sprague & Sandwith 1932
    - subsp. cuprea Sprague & Sandwith 1932
    - subsp. ferruginea (Ducke) M. F. da Silva 1986
    - subsp. velutina (Ducke) M.F. da Silva 1986
  - Dimorphandra gigantea Ducke 1935
  - Dimorphandra ignea Ducke 1935
  - Dimorphandra macrostachya Benth. 1840
    - subsp. congestiflora (Ducke) M. F. Silva 1986
    - subsp. glabrifolia (Ducke) M. F. Silva 1986
    - subsp. macrostachya Benth. 1840
  - Dimorphandra pennigera Tulasne 1844
  - Dimorphandra polyandra R. Benois 1917
  - Dimorphandra urubuensis Ducke 1944
  - Dimorphandra vernicosa^{†} Spruce ex Benth. 1867

^{†}Indicates the type species of the subgenus.
