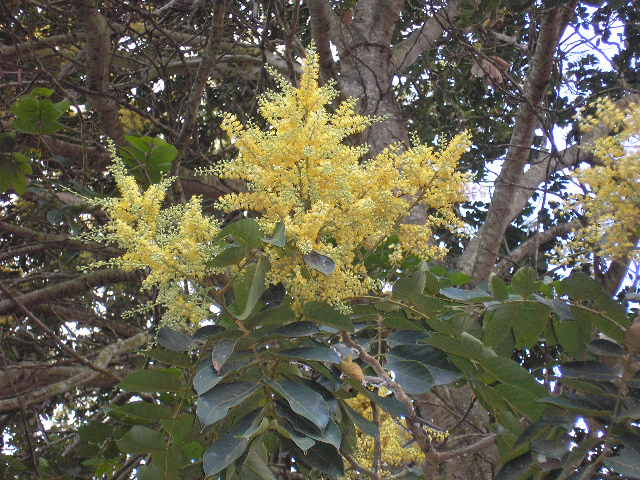
- Flowering T. paniculata in Bonfinópolis de Minas, Brazil

Scientific classification
- Kingdom: Plantae
- Clade: Tracheophytes
- Clade: Angiosperms
- Clade: Eudicots
- Clade: Rosids
- Order: Fabales
- Family: Fabaceae
- Subfamily: Caesalpinioideae
- Clade: Tachigali clade
- Genus: Tachigali; Aubl. (1775)

Species
- Several, see text

Synonyms
- Cuba Scop. (1777); Cubaea Schreb. (1789); Sclerolobium Vogel (1837); Tachia Pers. (1805), nom. illeg.; Valentinia Neck. (1790), opus utique oppr.

= Tachigali =

Genus of legumes

Tachigali is a flowering plant genus in the legume family (Fabaceae). It includes 74 species of trees native to the tropical Americas, ranging from Nicaragua to Bolivia, Paraguay, and southern Brazil. Typical habitats include tropical rain forest, lower montane forest, seasonally-flooded and non-flooded evergreen lowland forest and woodland, gallery and riparian forest, sometimes on white sands, cerrado and other dry woodland, and rocky grassland.

== Species ==
As of April 2023, Plants of the World Online accepted the following species:

- Tachigali acrensis van der Werff
- Tachigali alba Ducke
- Tachigali albiflora (Benoist) Zarucchi & Herend.
- Tachigali amarumayu Huamantupa, H.C.Lima & D.B.O.S.Cardoso
- Tachigali amplifolia (Ducke) Barneby
- Tachigali argyrophylla Ducke
- Tachigali aurea Tul.
- Tachigali barnebyi van der Werff
- Tachigali beaurepairei (Harms) L.F.Gomes da Silva & H.C.Lima
- Tachigali bicornuta van der Werff
- Tachigali bracteosa (Harms) Zarucchi & Pipoly
- Tachigali candelabrum van der Werff
- Tachigali catingae Ducke
- Tachigali cavipes (Spruce ex Benth.) J.F.Macbr.
- Tachigali cenepensis van der Werff
- Tachigali chrysaloides van der Werff
- Tachigali chrysophylla (Poepp.) Zarucchi & Herend.
- Tachigali colombiana Dwyer
- Tachigali costaricensis (N.Zamora & Pùveda) N.Zamora & van der Werff
- Tachigali davidsei Zarucchi & Herend.
- Tachigali densiflora (Benth.) L.F.Gomes da Silva & H.C.Lima
- Tachigali denudata (Vogel) Oliveira-Filho
- Tachigali duckei (Dwyer) Oliveira-Filho
- Tachigali dwyeri (R.S.Cowan) Zarucchi & Herend.
- Tachigali eriopetala (Ducke) L.F.Gomes da Silva & H.C.Lima
- Tachigali ferruginea van der Werff
- Tachigali formicarum Harms, syn. Tachigali tessmannii
- Tachigali friburgensis (Harms) L.F.Gomes da Silva & H.C.Lima
- Tachigali fusca van der Werff
- Tachigali glauca Tul.
- Tachigali goeldiana (Huber) L.F.Gomes da Silva & H.C.Lima
- Tachigali grandistipulata Harms
- Tachigali guianensis (Benth.) Zarucchi & Herend.
- Tachigali hypoleuca (Benth.) Zarucchi & Herend.
- Tachigali inca Huamantupa, H.C.Lima & D.B.O.S.Cardoso
- Tachigali inconspicua van der Werff
- Tachigali leiocalyx (Ducke) L.F.Gomes da Silva & H.C.Lima
- Tachigali longiflora Ducke
- Tachigali loretensis van der Werff
- Tachigali macbridei Zarucchi & Herend.
- Tachigali macropetala (Ducke) L.F.Gomes da Silva & H.C.Lima
- Tachigali macrostachya Huber
- Tachigali melanocarpa (Ducke) van der Werff
- Tachigali melinonii (Harms) Zarucchi & Herend.
- Tachigali micrantha (L.O.Williams) Zarucchi & Herend.
- Tachigali micropetala (Ducke) Zarucchi & Pipoly
- Tachigali odoratissima (Spruce ex Benth.) Zarucchi & Herend.
- Tachigali panamensis van der Werff & N.Zamora
- Tachigali paniculata Aubl.
- Tachigali paraensis (Huber) Barneby
- Tachigali paratyensis (Vell.) H.C.Lima
- Tachigali peruviana (Dwyer) Zarucchi & Herend.
- Tachigali physophora (Huber) Zarucchi & Herend.
- Tachigali pilgeriana (Harms) Oliveira-Filho
- Tachigali pilosa van der Werff
- Tachigali pimichinensis (R.S.Cowan) Zarucchi & Herend.
- Tachigali plumbea Ducke
- Tachigali poeppigiana Tul.
- Tachigali prancei (H.S.Irwin & Arroyo) L.F.Gomes da Silva & H.C.Lima
- Tachigali ptychophysca Spruce ex Benth.
- Tachigali pubiflora Benth.
- Tachigali richardiana Tul.
- Tachigali rigida Ducke
- Tachigali rubiginosa (Mart. ex Tul.) Oliveira-Filho
- Tachigali rugosa (Mart. ex Benth.) Zarucchi & Pipoly
- Tachigali schultesiana Dwyer
- Tachigali setifera (Ducke) Zarucchi & Herend.
- Tachigali spathulipetala L.F.Gomes da Silva, L.J.T.Cardoso, D.B.O.S.Cardoso & H.C.Lim
- Tachigali subvelutina (Benth.) Oliveira-Filho
- Tachigali tinctoria (Benth.) Zarucchi & Herend.
- Tachigali urbaniana (Harms) L.F.Gomes da Silva & H.C.Lima
- Tachigali vaupesiana van der Werff
- Tachigali venusta Dwyer
- Tachigali versicolor Standl. & L.O.Williams
- Tachigali vulgaris L.F.Gomes da Silva & H.C.Lima
