= Sympetalandra =

- Isotypic specimen of Sympetalandra densiflora.

Scientific classification
- Kingdom: Plantae
- Clade: Tracheophytes
- Clade: Angiosperms
- Clade: Eudicots
- Clade: Rosids
- Order: Fabales
- Family: Fabaceae
- Subfamily: Caesalpinioideae
- Tribe: Caesalpinieae
- Genus: Sympetalandra; Stapf (1902)

Genus of legumes

Sympetalandra is a genus of legume in the family Fabaceae. It includes five species of trees native to Malesia (Peninsular Malaysia, Sumatra, Borneo, the Lesser Sunda Islands, and the Philippines, where they grow in lowland tropical forest. It belongs subfamily Caesalpinioideae.

== Species ==
As of September 2023, Plants of the World Online accepted the following species:

- Sympetalandra borneensis Stapf
- Sympetalandra densiflora (Elmer) Steenis
- Sympetalandra hildebrandii Steenis
- Sympetalandra schmutzii Steenis
- Sympetalandra unijuga (Airy Shaw) Steenis
