= Plant anatomy =

Study of the internal structure of plants

Plant anatomy, or phytotomy, is the general term for the study of the internal structure of plants. Originally, it included plant morphology, the description of the physical form and external structure of plants, but since the mid-20th century, plant anatomy has been considered a separate field referring only to internal plant structure. Plant anatomy is now frequently investigated at the cellular level, and often involves the sectioning of tissues and microscopy.

== Structural divisions ==
Diagram of the anatomy of a plant with labels of structural parts of the plants and the roots. 1. Shoot system. 2. Root system. 3. Hypocotyl. 4. Terminal bud. 5. Leaf blade. 6. Internode. 7. Axillary bud. 8. Petiole. 9. Stem. 10. Node. 11. Tap root. 12. Root hairs. 13. Root tip. 14. Root cap

Some studies of plant anatomy use a systems approach, organized on the basis of the plant's activities, such as nutrient transport, flowering, pollination, embryogenesis or seed development. Others are more classically divided into the following structural categories:

- Flower anatomy, including study of the calyx, corolla, androecium, and gynoecium
- Leaf anatomy, including study of the epidermis, stomata and palisade cells
- Stem anatomy, including stem structure and vascular tissues, buds and shoot apex
- Fruit/Seed anatomy, including structure of the ovule, seed, pericarp and accessory fruit
- Wood anatomy, including structure of the bark, cork, xylem, phloem, vascular cambium, heartwood and sapwood and branch collar
- Root anatomy, including structure of the root, root tip, endodermis

== History ==
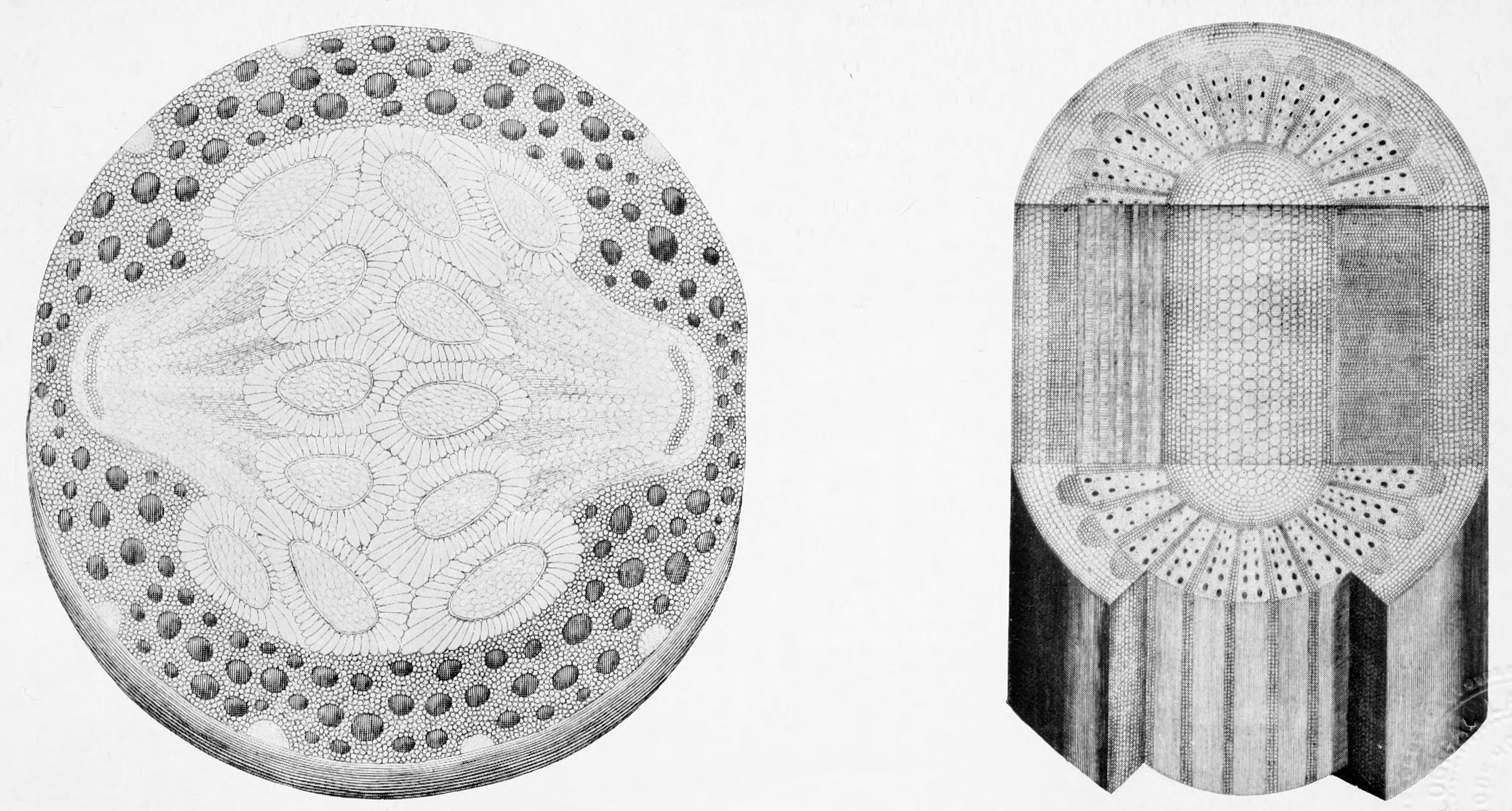
Vascular tissue of a gooseberry (left) and a vine branch (right) from Grew's Anatomy of Plants

About 300 BC, Theophrastus wrote a number of plant treatises, only two of which survive, Enquiry into Plants (Περὶ φυτῶν ἱστορία), and On the Causes of Plants (Περὶ φυτῶν αἰτιῶν). He developed concepts of plant morphology and classification, which did not withstand the scientific scrutiny of the Renaissance.

A Swiss physician and botanist, Gaspard Bauhin, introduced binomial nomenclature into plant taxonomy. He published “Pinax theatri botanici” in 1596, which was the first to use this convention for naming of species. His criteria for classification included natural relationships, or 'affinities', which in many cases were structural.

It was in the late 1600s that plant anatomy became refined into a modern science. Italian doctor and microscopist, Marcello Malpighi, was one of the two founders of plant anatomy. In 1671, he published his Anatomia Plantarum, the first major advance in plant physiogamy since Aristotle. The other founder was the British doctor Nehemiah Grew. He published “An Idea of a Philosophical History of Plants” in 1672. Grew is credited with the recognition of plant cells, although he called them 'vesicles' and 'bladders'. He correctly identified and described the organs of plants (flowers) and their parts.

In the eighteenth century, Carl Linnaeus established taxonomy based on structure, and his early work was with plant anatomy. While the exact structural level which is to be considered to be scientifically valid for comparison and differentiation has changed with the growth of knowledge, the basic principles were established by Linnaeus. He published his master work, Species Plantarum in 1753.

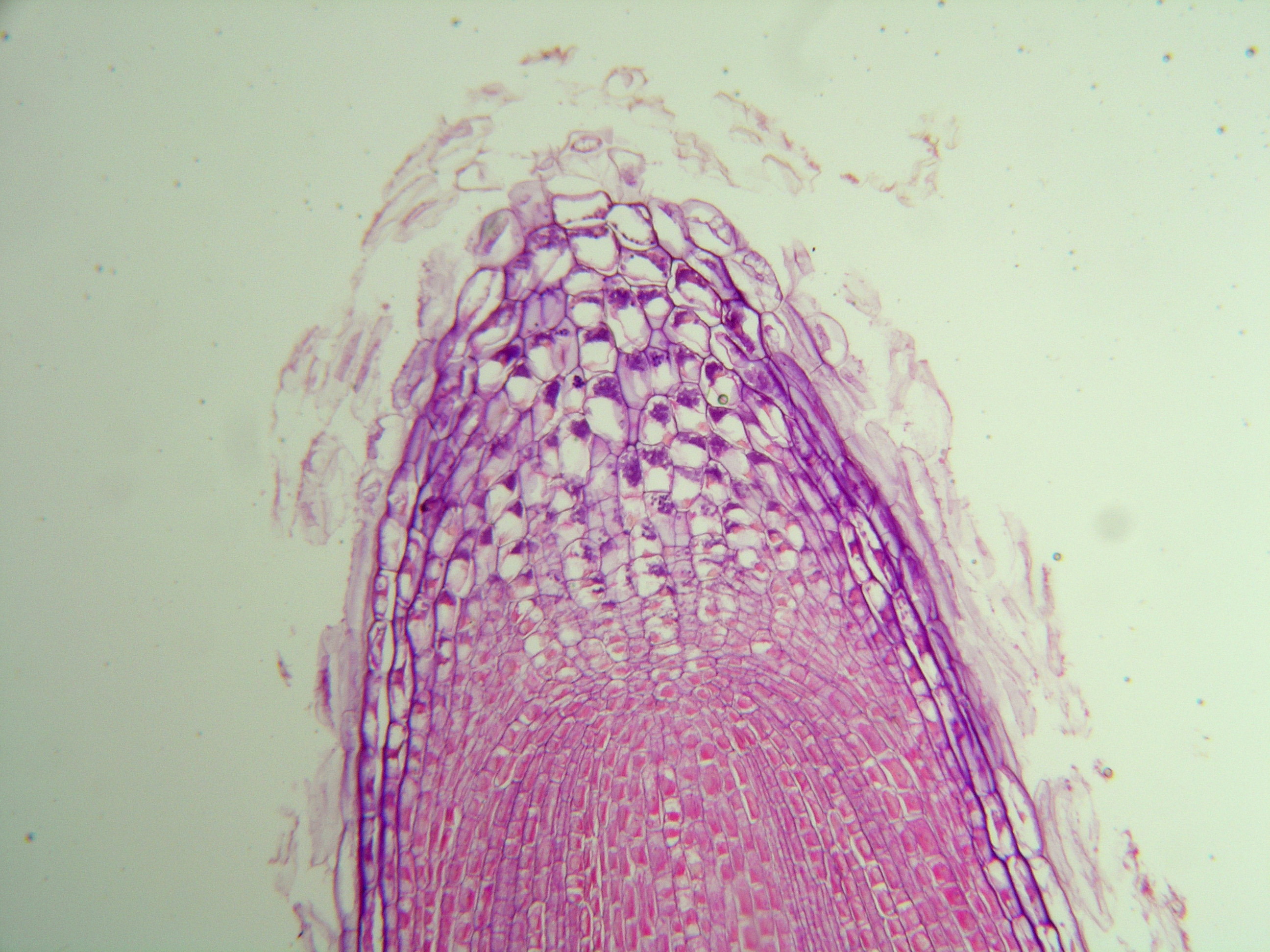
Root tip

In 1802, French botanist Charles-François Brisseau de Mirbel, published Traité d'anatomie et de physiologie végétale (Treatise on Plant Anatomy and Physiology) establishing the beginnings of the science of plant cytology.

In 1812, Johann Jacob Paul Moldenhawer published Beyträge zur Anatomie der Pflanzen, describing microscopic studies of plant tissues.

In 1813, a Swiss botanist, Augustin Pyrame de Candolle, published Théorie élémentaire de la botanique, in which he argued that plant anatomy, not physiology, ought to be the sole basis for plant classification. Using a scientific basis, he established structural criteria for defining and separating plant genera.

In 1830, Franz Meyen published Phytotomie, the first comprehensive review of plant anatomy.

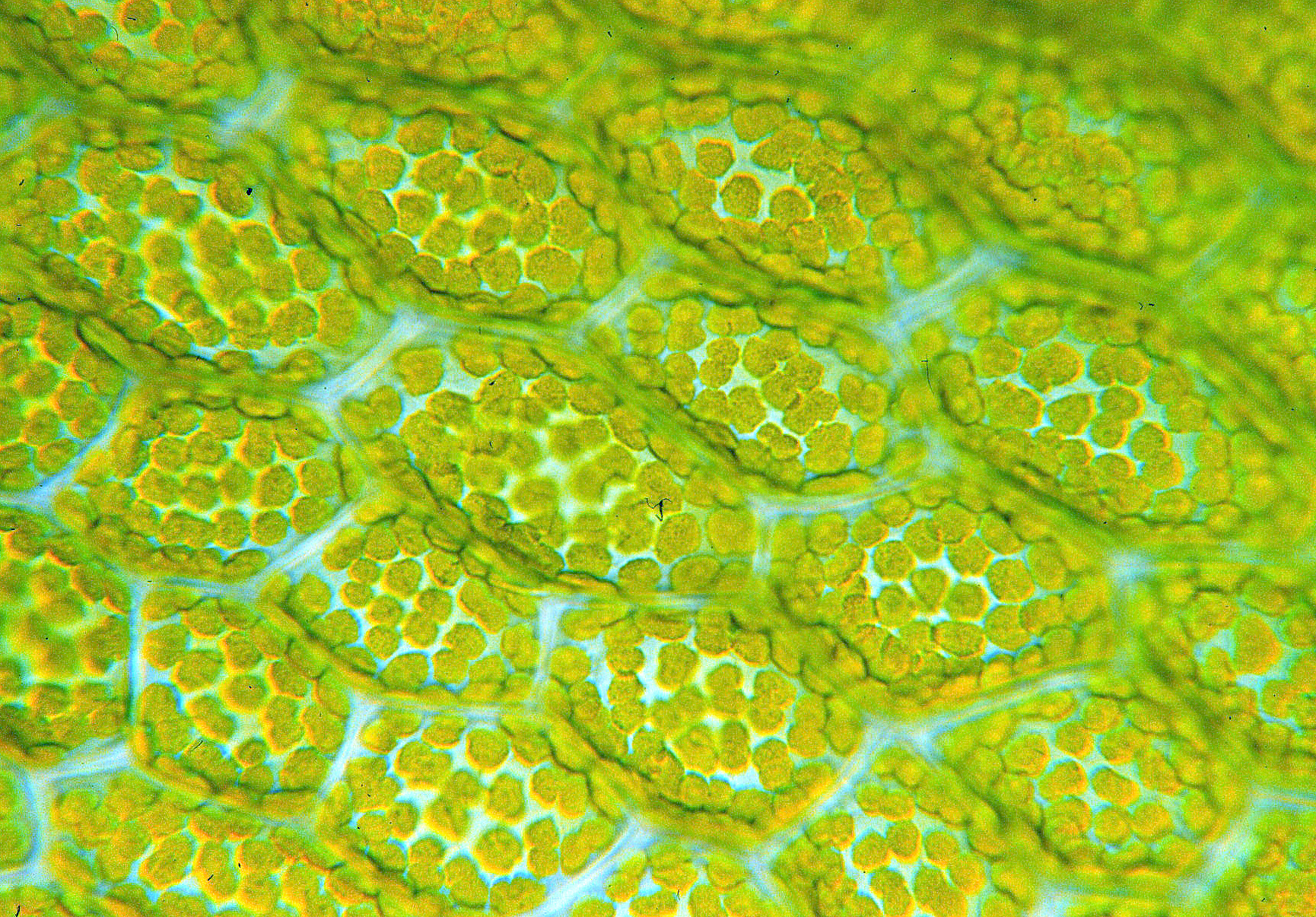
Chloroplasts in leaf cells of the moss Mnium stellare

In 1838, German botanist Matthias Jakob Schleiden, published Contributions to Phytogenesis, stating, "the lower plants all consist of one cell, while the higher plants are composed of (many) individual cells" thus confirming and continuing Mirbel's work.

A German-Polish botanist, Eduard Strasburger, described the mitotic process in plant cells and further demonstrated that new cell nuclei can only arise from the division of other pre-existing nuclei. His Studien über Protoplasma was published in 1876.

Gottlieb Haberlandt, a German botanist, studied plant physiology and classified plant tissue based upon function. On this basis, in 1884, he published Physiologische Pflanzenanatomie (Physiological Plant Anatomy), in which he described twelve types of tissue systems (absorptive, mechanical, photosynthetic, etc.).

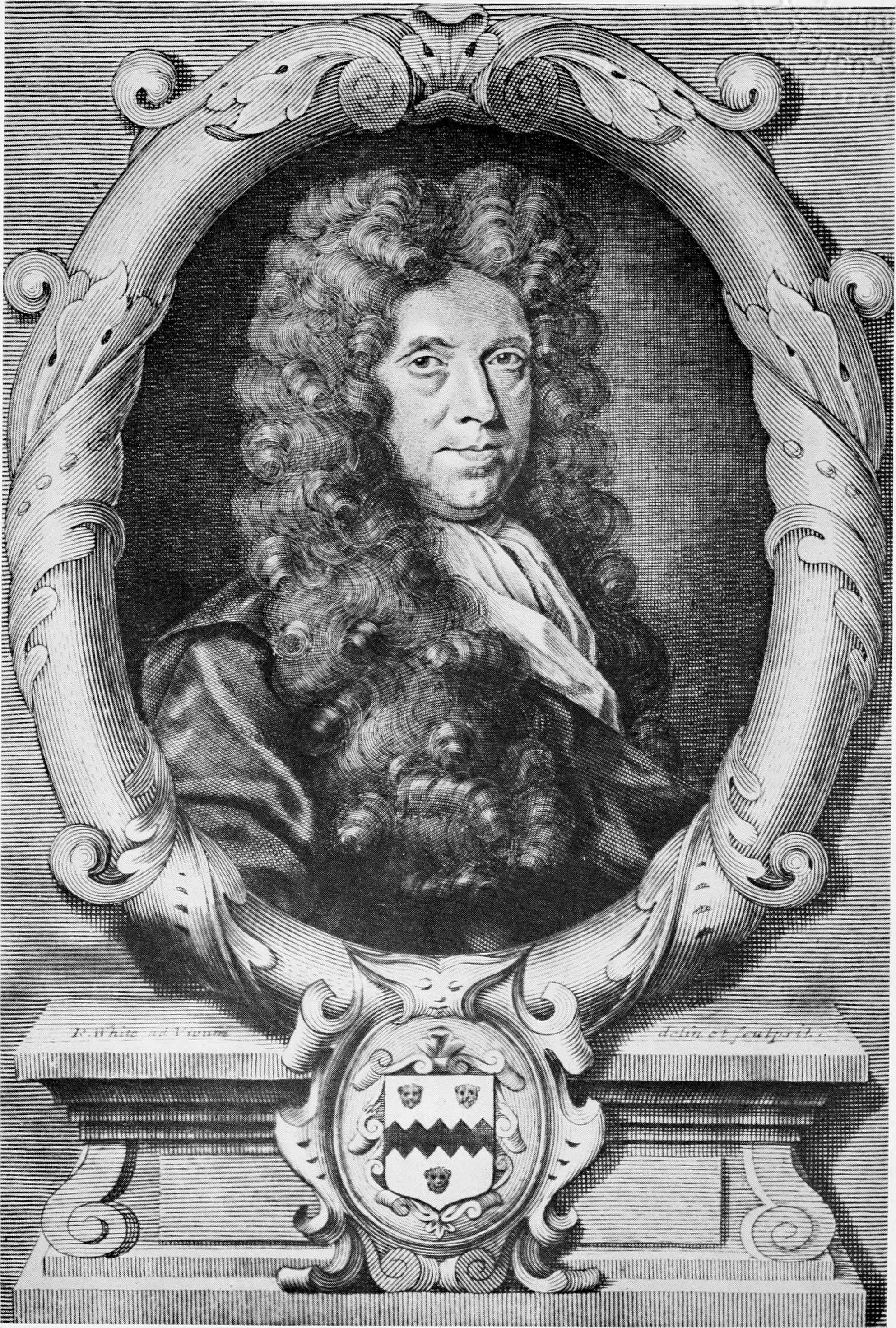
Nehemiah Grew, Father of Plant Anatomy

British paleobotanists Dunkinfield Henry Scott and William Crawford Williamson described the structures of fossilized plants at the end of the nineteenth century. Scott's Studies in Fossil Botany was published in 1900.

Following Charles Darwin's Origin of Species a Canadian botanist, Edward Charles Jeffrey, who was studying the comparative anatomy and phylogeny of different vascular plant groups, applied the theory to plants using the form and structure of plants to establish a number of evolutionary lines. He published his The Anatomy of Woody Plants in 1917.

The growth of comparative plant anatomy was spearheaded by British botanist Agnes Arber. She published Water Plants: A Study of Aquatic Angiosperms in 1920, Monocotyledons: A Morphological Study in 1925, and The Gramineae: A Study of Cereal, Bamboo and Grass in 1934.

Following World War II, Katherine Esau published, Plant Anatomy (1953), which became the definitive textbook on plant structure in North American universities and elsewhere, it was still in print as of 2006. She followed up with her Anatomy of seed plants in 1960.
