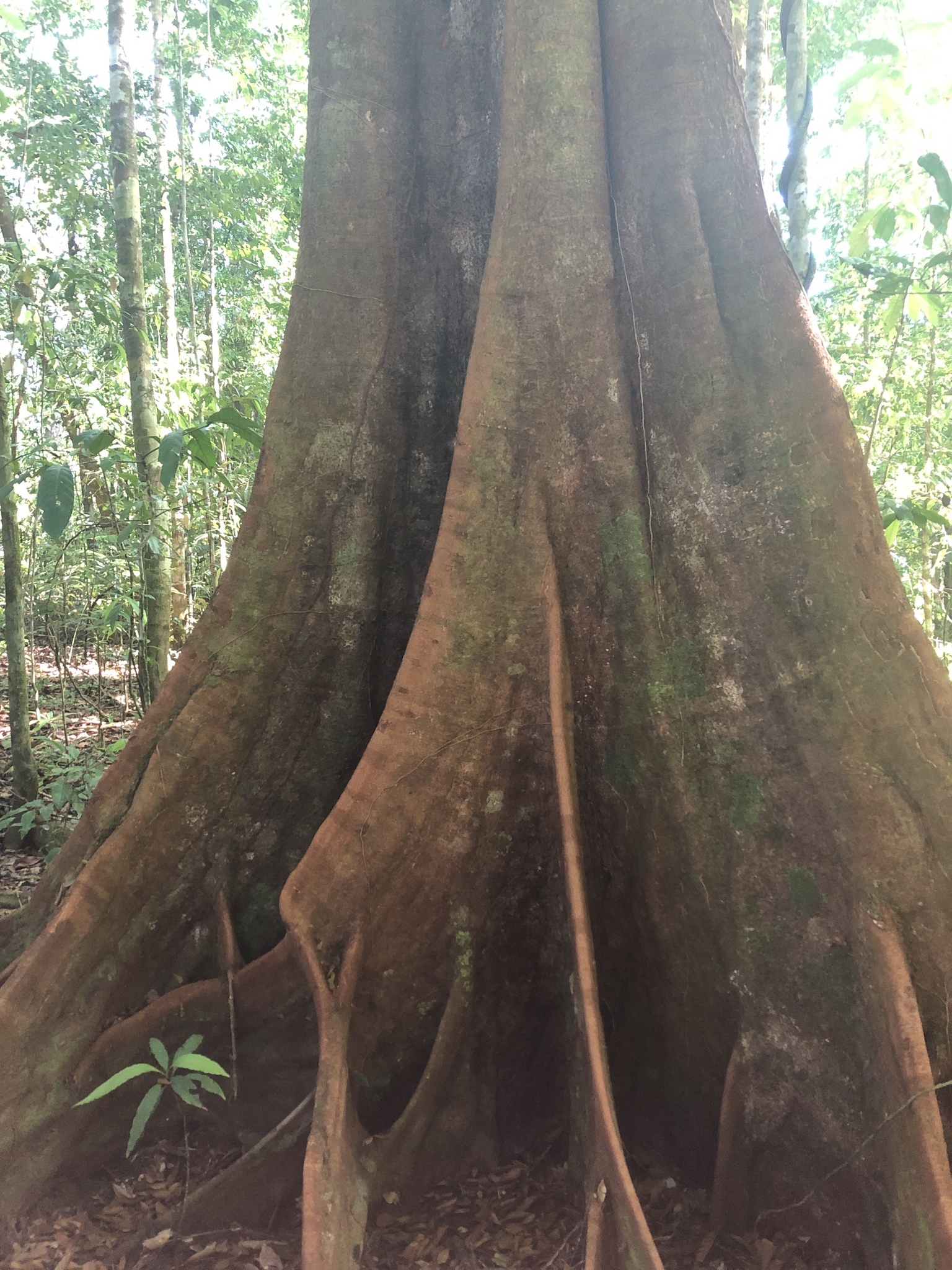

Scientific classification
- Kingdom: Plantae
- Clade: Tracheophytes
- Clade: Angiosperms
- Clade: Eudicots
- Clade: Rosids
- Order: Fabales
- Family: Fabaceae
- Subfamily: Caesalpinioideae
- Genus: Tachigali
- Species: T. versicolor

Binomial name
- Tachigali versicolor Standl. & L.O.Williams

= Tachigali versicolor =

Species of legume

Tachigali versicolor or the suicide tree is a species of tree found from Costa Rica to western Colombia. It is monocarpic, flowering only once before dying, which gives rise to its common name of the "suicide tree".

== Reproduction ==
Tachigali versicolor reproduces only once in its lifetime once the trees are mature. Within a year of flowering the tree rapidly dies and falls over. The trait was first noticed by Robin Foster in 1970, while working in Panama. Carlos Fonseca reported that another species in the genus, Tachigali myrmecophila is also monocarpic. The age at which they reproduce is unknown, however, and growth rates vary widely depending on the amount of light that the trees grow in. Reproduction (and death) has been observed to occur in a four to six-year cycle; if flowering occurs one year then it will not occur for the next three to five years. When studied on Barro Colorado Island in Panama, they were observed to flower in 1970, 1974, 1978, 1983, 1984, 1989 and 1994. Despite the suicidal nature of their reproductive strategy they do not appear to divert any more nutrients into their one set of seeds than other similar trees. While apparently maladaptive, the strategy has been suggested to be effective at maintaining populations, as when the parent tree dies it creates a gap in the canopy which the seedlings require to grow.

Flowering occurs between January and July, with individuals flowering for between 6 and 12 weeks. The fruits are large, wind dispersed samaras and they mostly fall within 100m of the parent tree. The seeds, which weigh around half a gram are predated while still on the tree by parrots and bruchid beetles (Amblycerus tachygaliae) and once on the forest floor by rodents, peccaries and fungi. The seeds lack dormancy and germinate in late April and early May. The seedlings are tolerant of shade and can survive for many years in the understorey while waiting for a gap in the canopy to form. For that reason, seedlings are more likely to survive growing under the canopy of other T. versicolor trees than under trees of a different species. For the first two months after germination, those that grow in the shade are more likely to survive because less grazing occurs in the shade. After two months those in light gaps are more likely to survive. Each tree produces around 50,000 seeds of which 30% germinate and 5% survive for more than two years. If light conditions change, the seedlings are able to quickly adapt to the new conditions by growing new leaves that are specially adapted to capture the light level. Compared to other monocarpic trees that grow in similar environments, T. versicolor has relatively high seed mass, dispersal capability, photosynthetic flexibility and seedling survival in the shaded understory in the first year of growth.

== Ecology ==
Leaf cutter ants do not harvest the leaves of the suicide tree, presumably because the leaves contain anti-fungal chemicals which would kill the fungus they depend on to digest leaves.

=== Symbionts ===
As a member of the family Fabaceae it has a symbiotic relationship with nitrogen fixing bacteria. The bacteria found in the trees nodules are from the genus Bradyrhizobium.

== Uses ==
Indigenous people in the Amazon basin use an extract of the tree to treat fungal skin infections and it is also used as timber.
