= Heteroflorum =

Scientific classification
- Kingdom: Plantae
- Clade: Tracheophytes
- Clade: Angiosperms
- Clade: Eudicots
- Clade: Rosids
- Order: Fabales
- Family: Fabaceae
- Subfamily: Caesalpinioideae
- Genus: Heteroflorum; M.Sousa (2005)
- Species: H. sclerocarpum

Binomial name
- Heteroflorum sclerocarpum M.Sousa (2005)

Genus of legumes

Heteroflorum is a genus of flowering plants in the family Fabaceae. It contains a single species, Heteroflorum sclerocarpum, a tree native to the southwestern Mexican states of Michoacán, Guerrero, and Oaxaca. It belongs to the subfamily Caesalpinioideae.
