= Johann Jacob Paul Moldenhawer =

German botanist (1766–1827)

Johann Jacob Paul Moldenhawer (11 February 1766 – 21 August 1827) was a German botanist who made a number of important discoveries in plant anatomy.

He was born in Hamburg, the son of a minister, and started out studying theology and the classics. At some unknown point he became interested in plants, and in 1791 he published Tentamen in historiam plantarum Theophrasti, on Theophrastus, and the following year he is recorded as "Extraordinary Professor of Botany and Fruit Tree Culture" (außerordentlicher Professor für Botanik und Obstbau) at the University of Kiel. He studied plant anatomy from 1795 until 1812, when he published Beyträge zur Anatomie der Pflanzen on his results. Immediately subsequently he concentrated on fruit tree culture. He died in Kiel.

Moldenhawer's contributions center on the microscopic examination of plant tissues, for which he devised techniques to separate the cells from the middle lamella layer that separates them. He identified vascular and parenchymatous tissues, described vascular bundles, observed the cells in the cambium, and interpreted tree rings. He found that stomata were composed pairs of cells, rather than a single cell with a hole. Although Moldenhawer is not credited with the cell theory, his work provided key documentation for the validity of the theory in plants.

The genus Moldenhawera is named in his honor.
