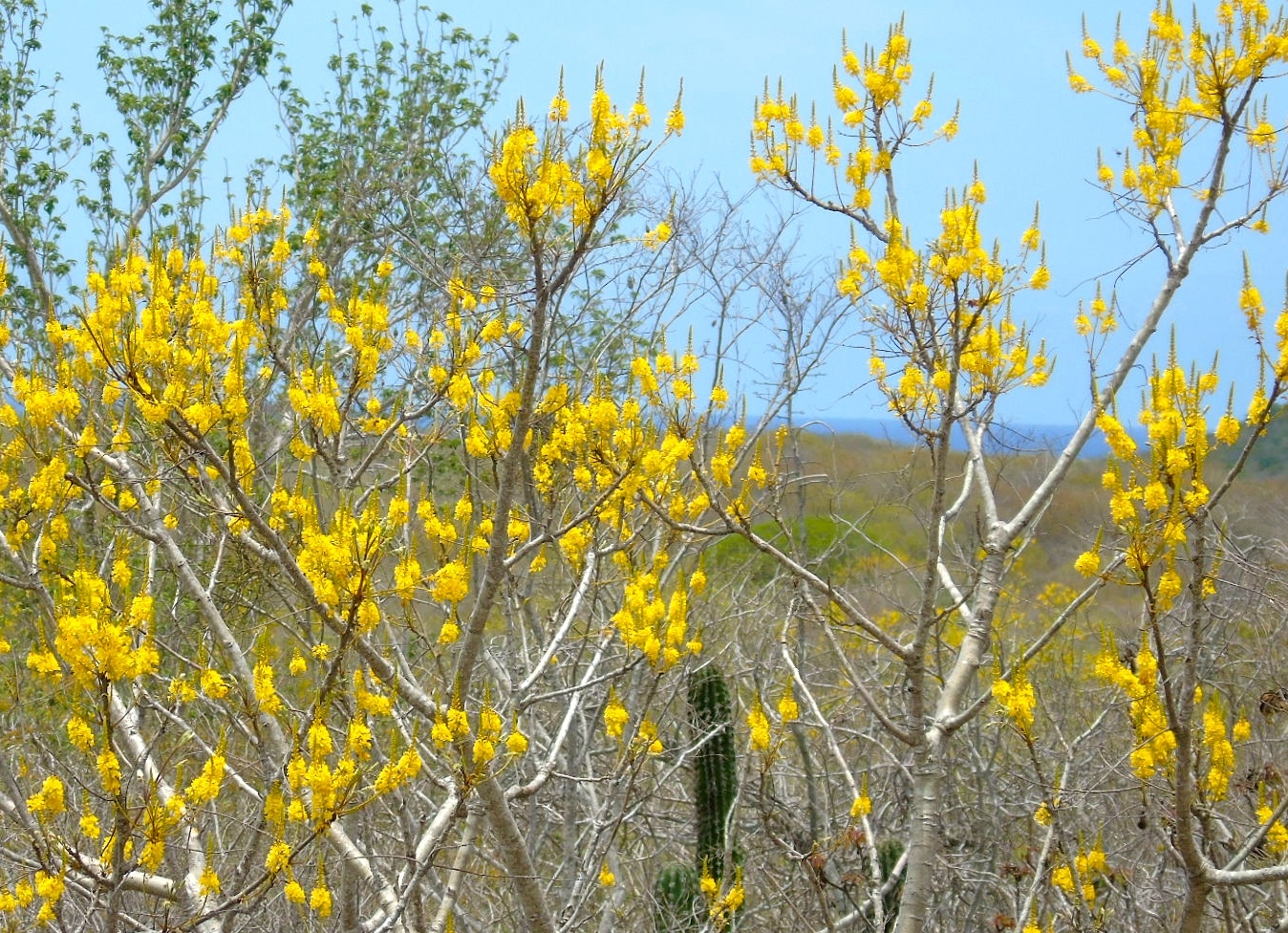
- Conzattia multiflora

Scientific classification
- Kingdom: Plantae
- Clade: Tracheophytes
- Clade: Angiosperms
- Clade: Eudicots
- Clade: Rosids
- Order: Fabales
- Family: Fabaceae
- Subfamily: Caesalpinioideae
- Genus: Conzattia; Rose

Species
- Conzattia chiapensis; Conzattia multiflora; Conzattia sericea

= Conzattia =

Genus of legumes

Conzattia is a genus of flowering plants in the legume family, Fabaceae. It belongs to the subfamily Caesalpinioideae.

The genus is native to Mexico, and includes trees and shrubs native to tropical and subtropical seasonally-dry forests, woodlands, and scrublands.

Conzattia multiflora is used for construction timber, fuel, and medicine across its native range. It is often found growing near ancient temples, which may be an indication of its use by indigenous peoples.

== Species ==
Three species are recognized:

- Conzattia chiapensis Miranda – southeastern Mexico
- Conzattia multiflora (B.L.Rob.) Standl. – northwestern, northeastern, central, southwestern, and Gulf coastal Mexico.
- Conzattia sericea Standl. – northwestern Mexico
