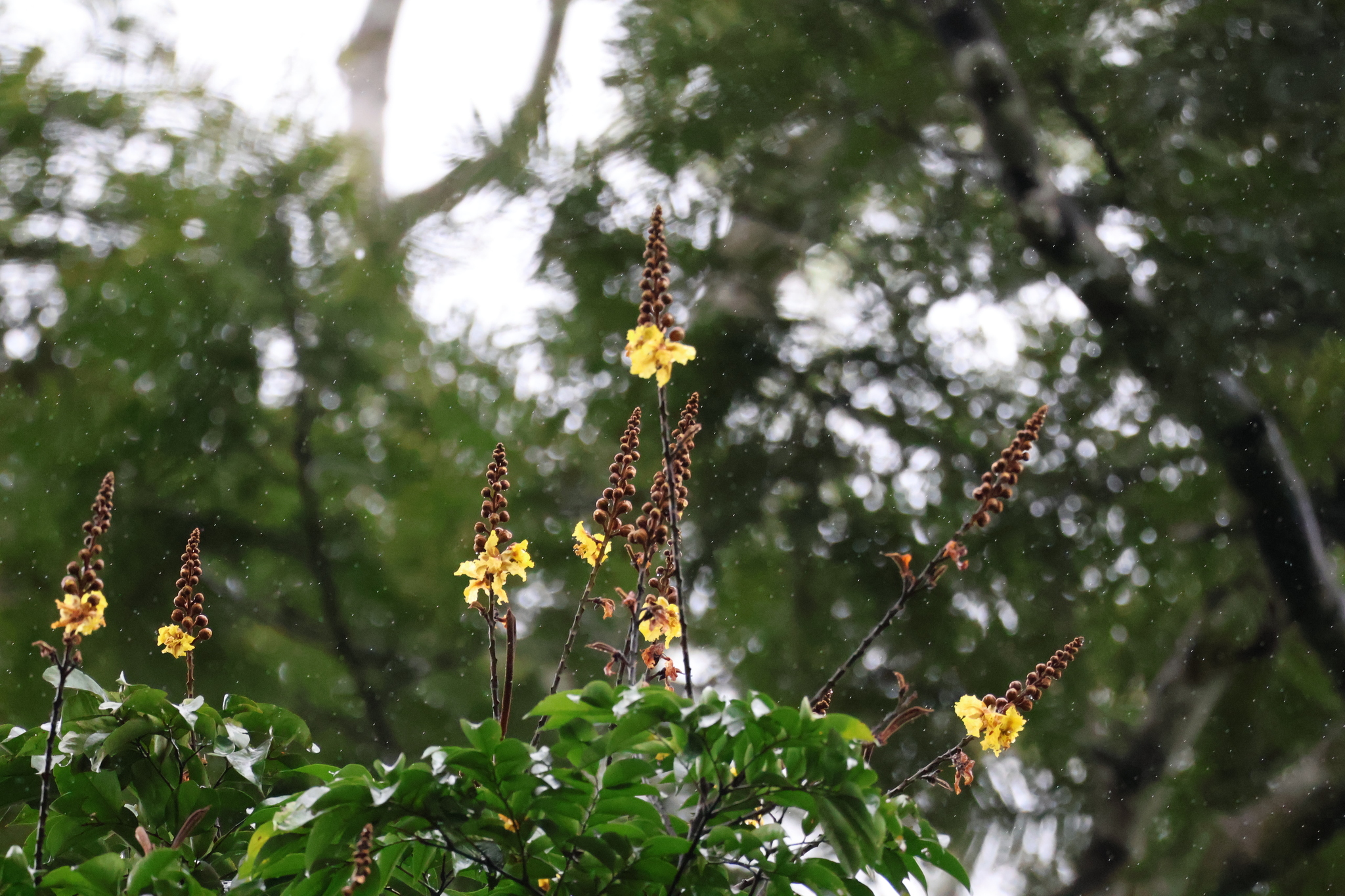
- Bussea occidentalis in Liberia

Scientific classification
- Kingdom: Plantae
- Clade: Embryophytes
- Clade: Tracheophytes
- Clade: Spermatophytes
- Clade: Angiosperms
- Clade: Eudicots
- Clade: Rosids
- Order: Fabales
- Family: Fabaceae
- Subfamily: Caesalpinioideae
- Genus: Bussea; Harms

Species
- 7; see text

= Bussea =

Genus of legumes

Bussea is a genus of flowering plants in the legume family, Fabaceae. It includes seven species of trees and occasionally shrubs native to sub-Saharan Africa, ranging from Guinea to Ghana in West Africa, from Gabon and Angola to Tanzania and Mozambique in central Africa, and to Madagascar. Habitats include seasonally-dry tropical forests and thickets, moist semi-deciduous forests, and evergreen rain forest.

As of August 2023, seven species were accepted:

- Bussea eggelingii Verdc. – Tanzania
- Bussea gossweileri Baker f. – Gabon to northeastern Angola
- Bussea massaiensis (Taub.) Harms – Tanzania and Zambia
- Bussea occidentalis Hutch. – Guinea to Ghana
- Bussea perrieri R.Vig. – western Madagascar
- Bussea sakalava Du Puy & R.Rabev. – northern and Western Madagascar
- Bussea xylocarpa (Sprague) Sprague & Craib – Mozambique
