= Tetrapterocarpon =

Scientific classification
- Kingdom: Plantae
- Clade: Tracheophytes
- Clade: Angiosperms
- Clade: Eudicots
- Clade: Rosids
- Order: Fabales
- Family: Fabaceae
- Subfamily: Caesalpinioideae
- Genus: Tetrapterocarpon; Humbert

Species
- T. geayi Humbert; T. septentrionalis Du Puy & R.Rabev.

Genus of legumes

Tetrapterocarpon is a genus of flowering plants in the legume family, Fabaceae. It belongs to the subfamily Caesalpinioideae. It is endemic to Madagascar.

== Species ==
Two species are accepted:

- Tetrapterocarpon geayi Humbert
- Tetrapterocarpon septentrionalis Du Puy & R.Rabev.
