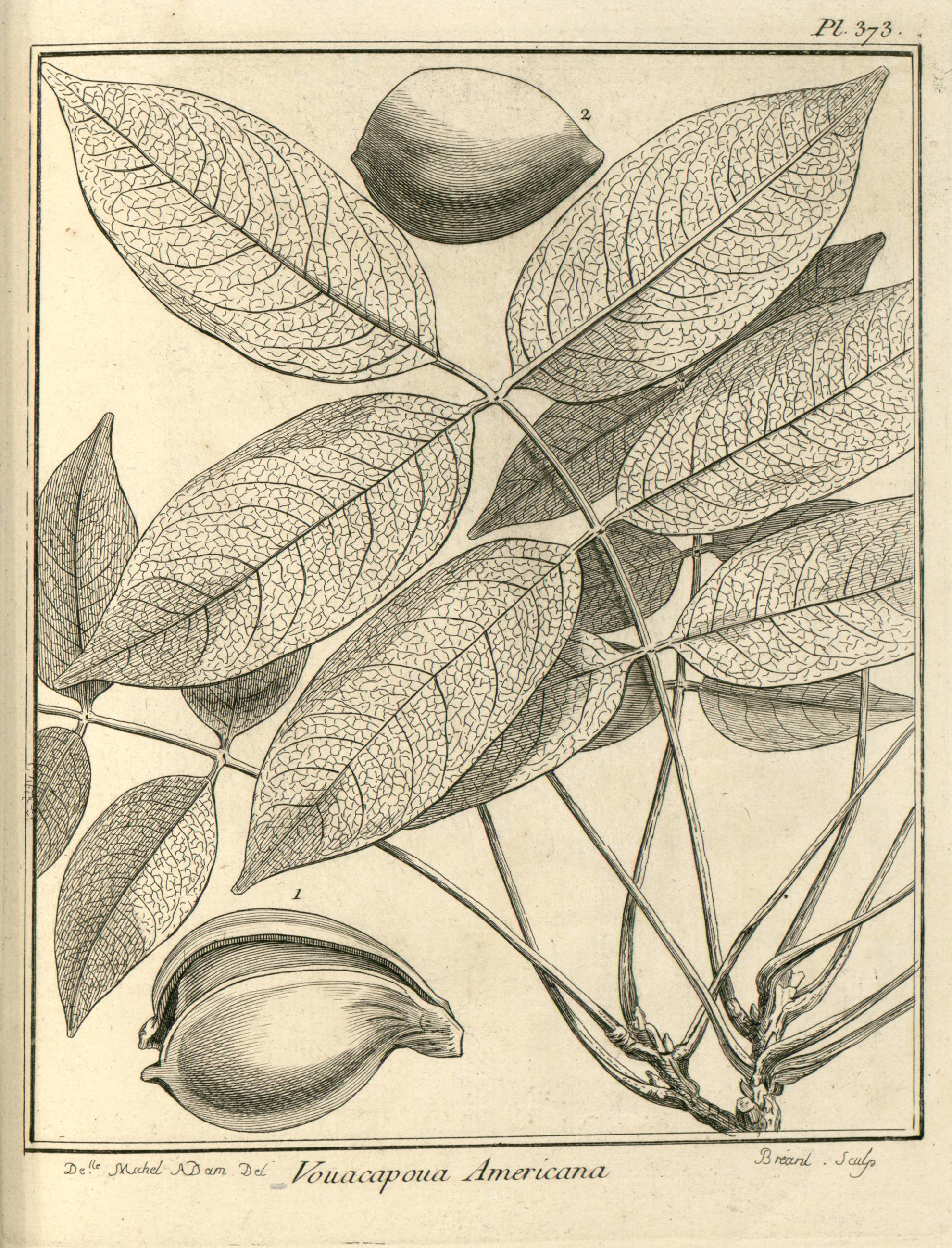

Conservation status
- Critically Endangered (IUCN 2.3)

Scientific classification
- Kingdom: Plantae
- Clade: Tracheophytes
- Clade: Angiosperms
- Clade: Eudicots
- Clade: Rosids
- Order: Fabales
- Family: Fabaceae
- Subfamily: Caesalpinioideae
- Genus: Vouacapoua
- Species: V. americana

Binomial name
- Vouacapoua americana Aubl.

= Vouacapoua americana =

Species of legume

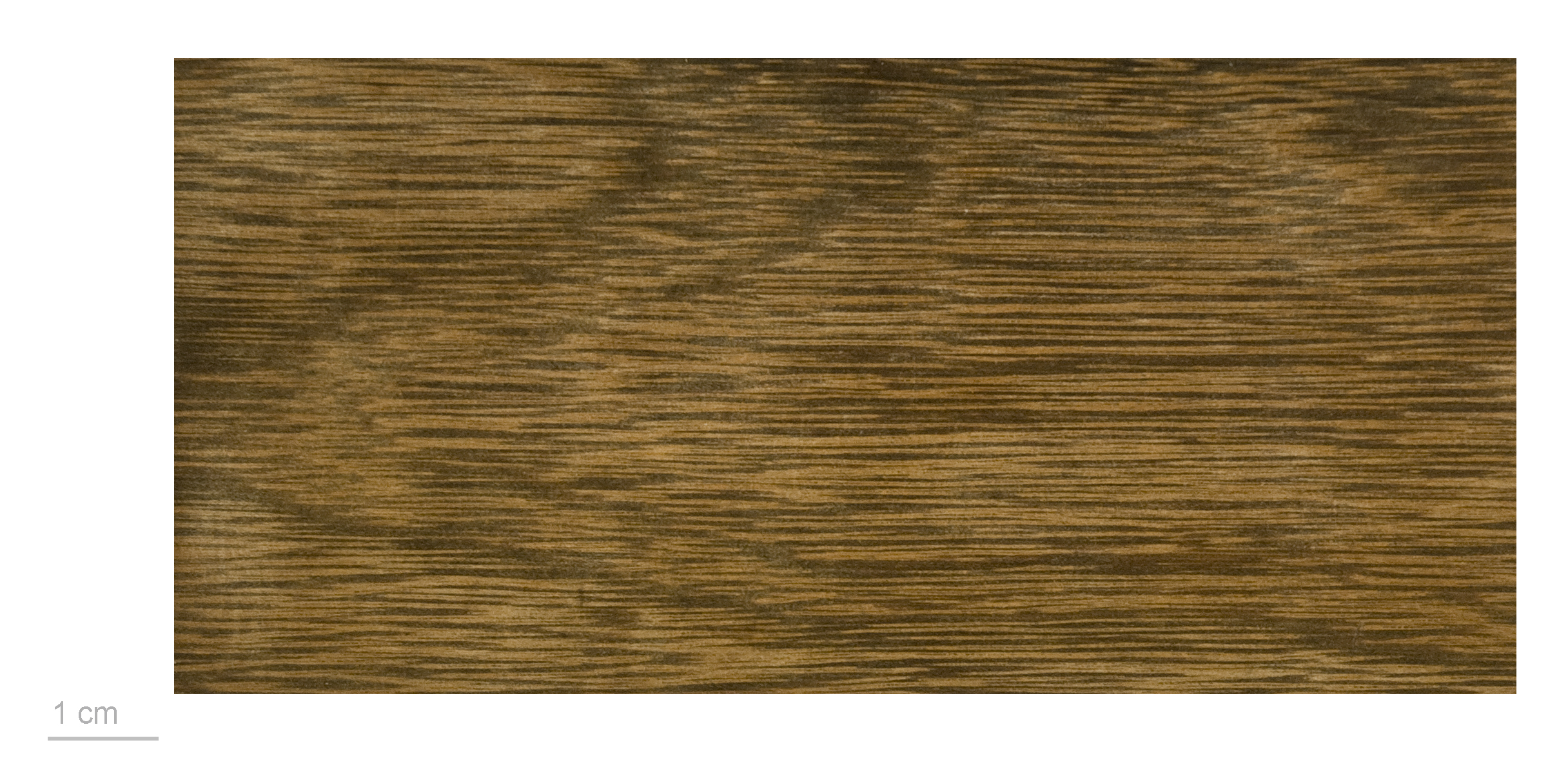
Vouacapoua americana - MHNT

Vouacapoua americana (wacapou or acapu) is a species of tree in the legume family (Fabaceae). The timber is used in heavy construction and carpentry.

== Distribution ==
Vouacapoua americana is found in Brazil, French Guiana, Guyana and Suriname. It is threatened by over exploitation.
