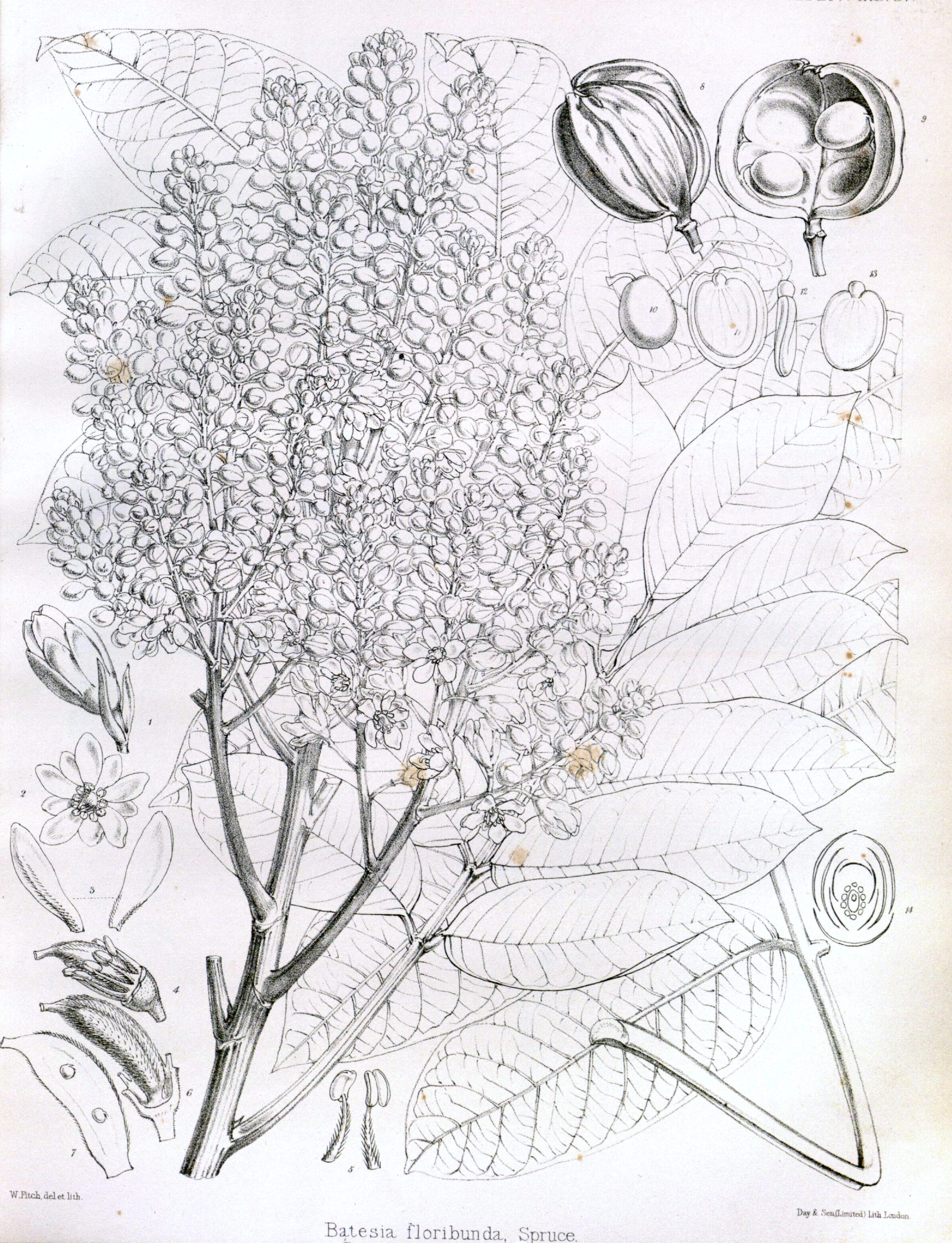

Scientific classification
- Kingdom: Plantae
- Clade: Tracheophytes
- Clade: Angiosperms
- Clade: Eudicots
- Clade: Rosids
- Order: Fabales
- Family: Fabaceae
- Subfamily: Caesalpinioideae
- Tribe: Cassieae
- Genus: Batesia; Spruce ex Benth. & Hook.f. (1865)
- Species: B. floribunda

Binomial name
- Batesia floribunda Spruce ex Benth. (1865)

= Batesia =

Genus of legumes

Batesia is a genus of flowering plants in the legume family, Fabaceae. It contains a single species, Batesia floribunda, a tree native to northern South America. It ranges from Colombia and Peru through northern, west-central, and northeastern Brazil and French Guiana. The genus belongs to subfamily Caesalpinioideae.
