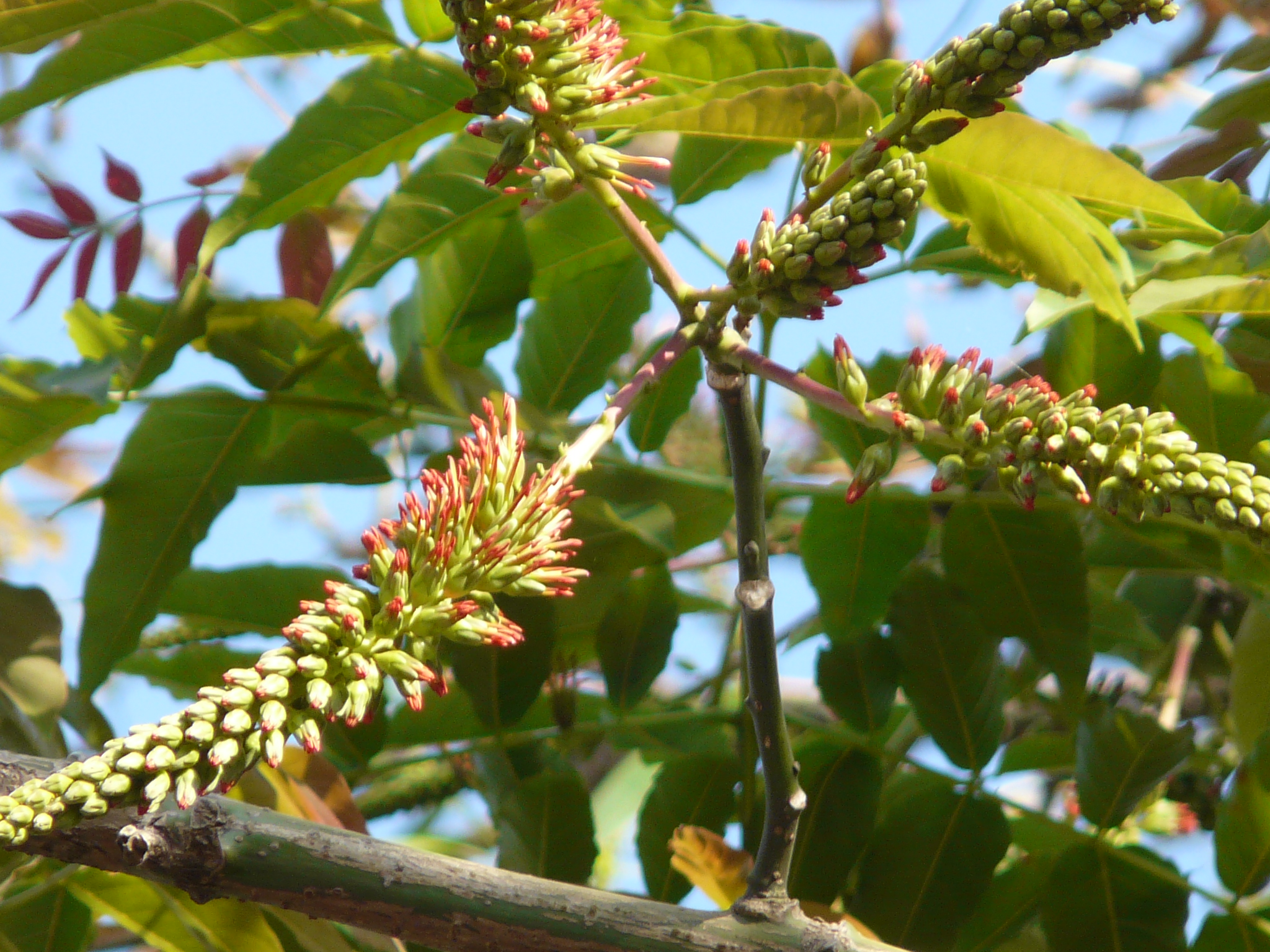
- Inflorescences.

Scientific classification
- Kingdom: Plantae
- Clade: Embryophytes
- Clade: Tracheophytes
- Clade: Spermatophytes
- Clade: Angiosperms
- Clade: Eudicots
- Clade: Rosids
- Order: Fabales
- Family: Fabaceae
- Subfamily: Caesalpinioideae
- Genus: Acrocarpus; Wight ex Arn.
- Species: A. fraxinifolius

Binomial name
- Acrocarpus fraxinifolius Arn.

= Acrocarpus =

Genus of legumes

Acrocarpus is a genus of trees in the legume family, Fabaceae. It comprises one species, Acrocarpus fraxinifolius, the pink cedar, a large deciduous emergent tree native to Bangladesh, Bhutan, China, India, Indonesia, Laos, Myanmar, Nepal and Thailand. Its also known as Balangi or Kurungatti in India.

== Uses ==
The species has been identified as one of the food plants of the endangered lion-tailed macaque during periods of fruit scarcity.

It is used as a shade tree in coffee plantations in India, where it is also considered a species of choice for establishment in plantations in badly degraded areas unprotected from cattle grazing. According to the bureau of Indian standards, the timber is recommended for the making of furniture, cabinets and tea boxes.
