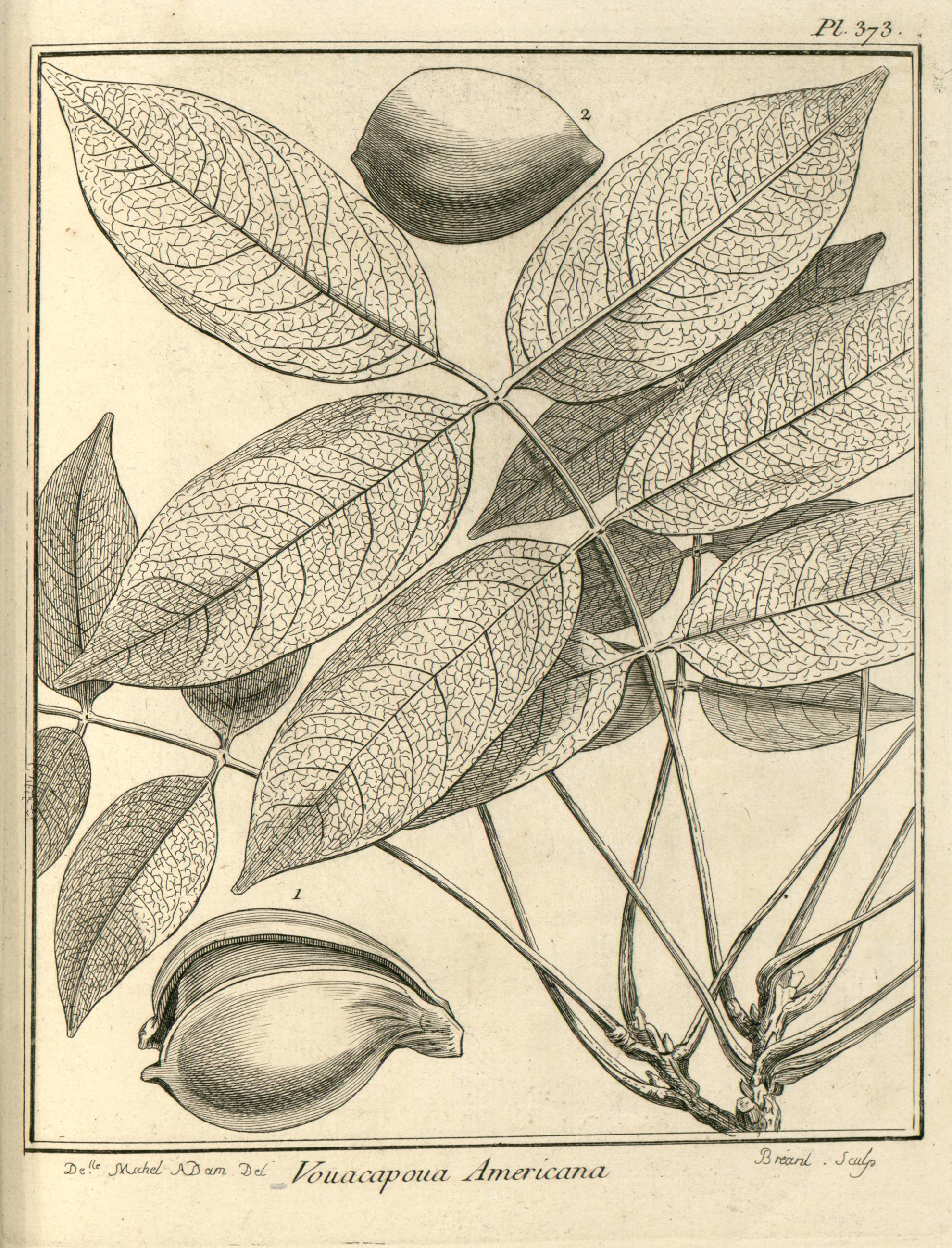
- Vouacapoua americana

Scientific classification
- Kingdom: Plantae
- Clade: Tracheophytes
- Clade: Angiosperms
- Clade: Eudicots
- Clade: Rosids
- Order: Fabales
- Family: Fabaceae
- Subfamily: Caesalpinioideae
- Tribe: Caesalpinieae
- Genus: Vouacapoua; Aubl. (1775)

Species
- 3; see text

= Vouacapoua =

Genus of legumes

Vouacapoua is a genus of legume in the family Fabaceae, subfamily Caesalpinioideae. It includes three species of trees native to northern South America, ranging from the Guianas to northern and northeastern Brazil. They grow in terre firme Amazonian rain forest.

== Species ==
As of September 2023, Plants of the World Online accepted the following species:

- Vouacapoua americana Aubl.
- Vouacapoua macropetala Sandwith
- Vouacapoua pallidior Ducke
