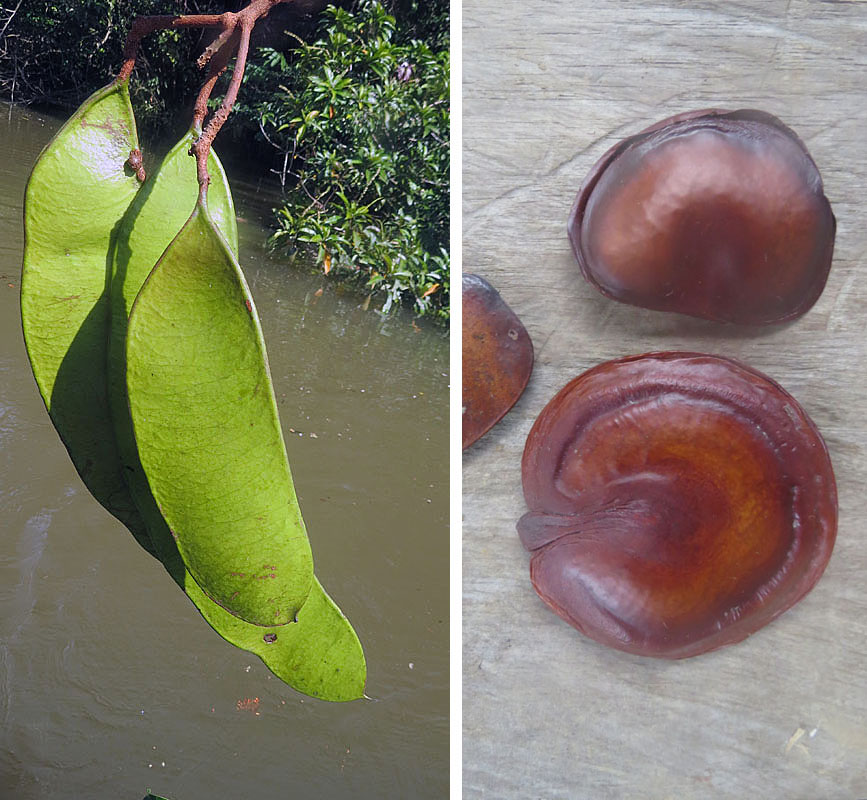
- pods and legumes of Campsiandra comosa

Scientific classification
- Kingdom: Plantae
- Clade: Embryophytes
- Clade: Tracheophytes
- Clade: Spermatophytes
- Clade: Angiosperms
- Clade: Eudicots
- Clade: Rosids
- Order: Fabales
- Family: Fabaceae
- Subfamily: Caesalpinioideae
- Clade: Tachigali clade
- Genus: Campsiandra; Benth. (1840)

Species
- 22; see text

= Campsiandra =

Genus of legumes

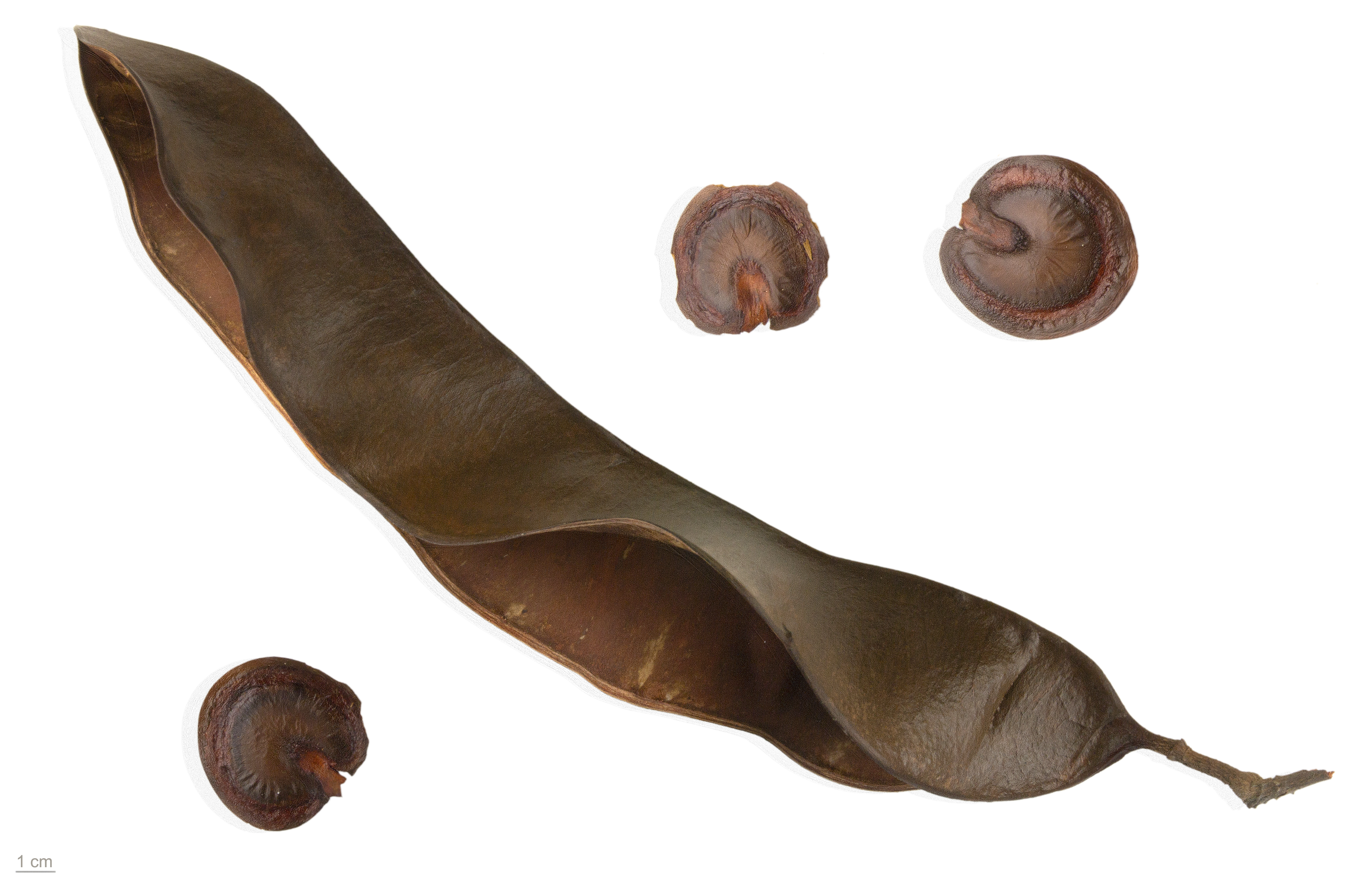
Campsiandra angustifolia MHNT

Campsiandra is a genus of flowering plants in the family Fabaceae. It includes 22 species native to northern South America. The genus belongs to the subfamily Caesalpinioideae.

== Species ==
- Campsiandra angustifolia Spruce ex Benth.
- Campsiandra aymardii Stergios
- Campsiandra casiquiarensis Stergios
- Campsiandra chigo-montero Stergios
- Campsiandra comosa Benth.
- Campsiandra cowaniana Stergios
- Campsiandra curaara Stergios
- Campsiandra emonensis Stergios
- Campsiandra felipeana Stergios
- Campsiandra ferruginea Stergios
- Campsiandra gomez-alvareziana Stergios
- Campsiandra guayanensis Stergios
- Campsiandra implexicaulis Stergios
- Campsiandra laurifolia Benth.
- Campsiandra macrocarpa R.S.Cowan
- Campsiandra nutans Stergios
- Campsiandra pasibensis Stergios
- Campsiandra robclarkiana Stergios
- Campsiandra steyermarkiana Stergios
- Campsiandra taphornii Stergios
- Campsiandra velutina Stergios
- Campsiandra wurdackiana Stergios
