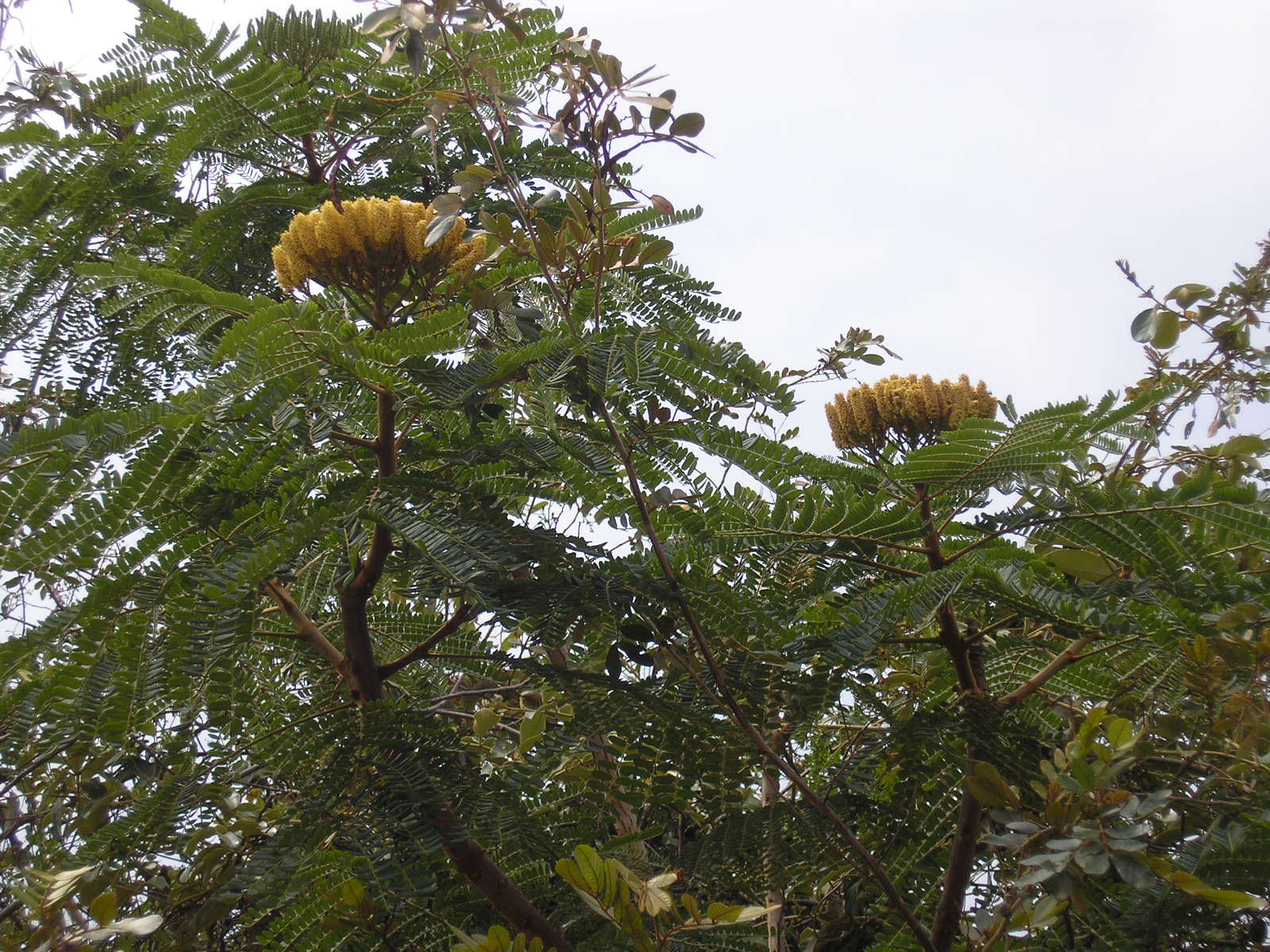
- Dimorphandra mollis

Scientific classification
- Kingdom: Plantae
- Clade: Tracheophytes
- Clade: Angiosperms
- Clade: Eudicots
- Clade: Rosids
- Order: Fabales
- Family: Fabaceae
- Subfamily: Caesalpinioideae
- Genus: Dimorphandra
- Species: D. mollis

Binomial name
- Dimorphandra mollis Benth.

= Dimorphandra mollis =

Species of legume

Dimorphandra mollis, the Fava d'anta, is a tree species in the genus of Dimorphandra. It is a plant of the Cerrado vegetation of Brazil. The seeds are known to be toxic to cattle.

Fava d'anta contains astilbin, rutin and quercetin.

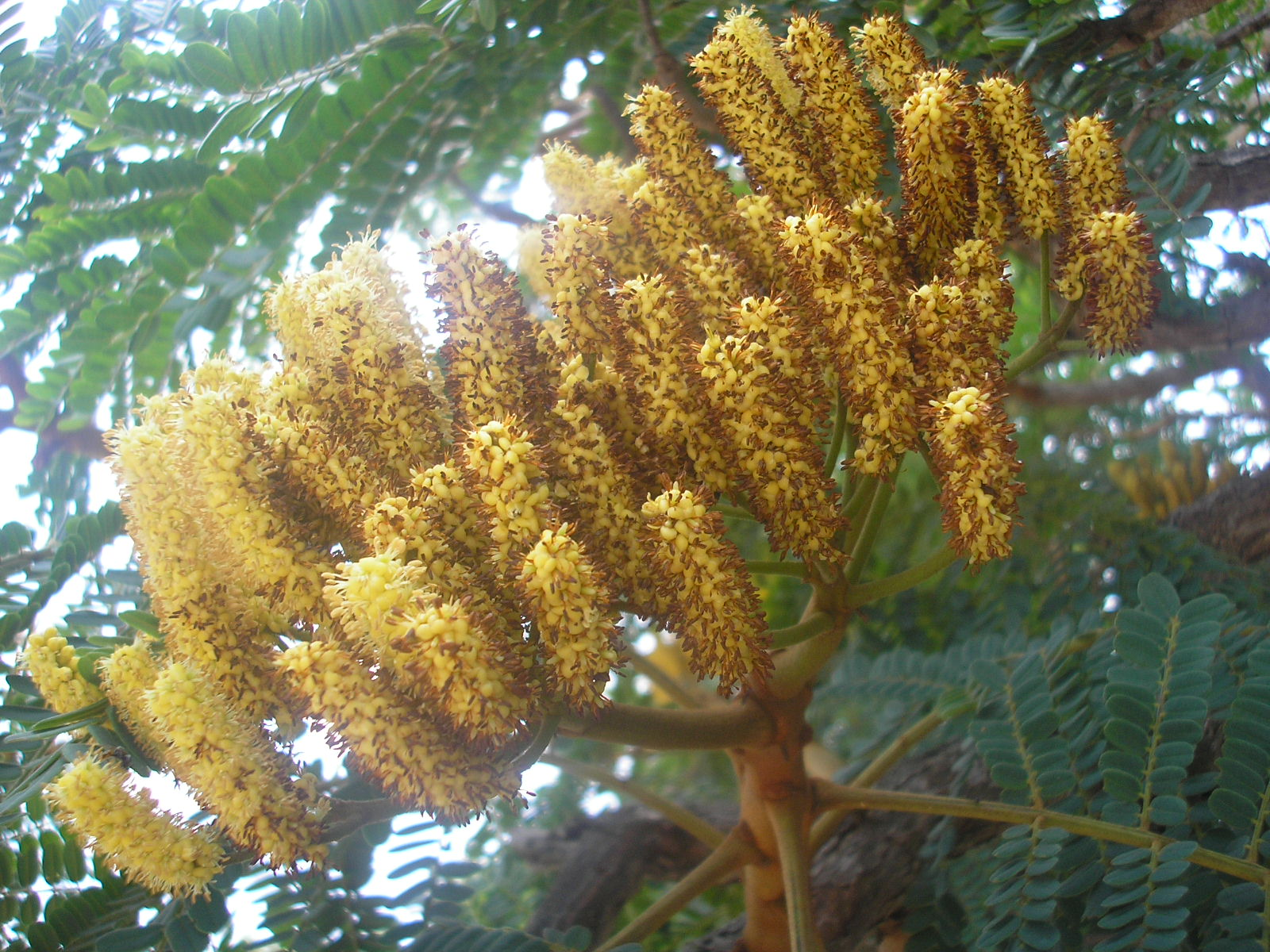
Flowers
