= Stachyothyrsus =

Scientific classification
- Kingdom: Plantae
- Clade: Tracheophytes
- Clade: Angiosperms
- Clade: Eudicots
- Clade: Rosids
- Order: Fabales
- Family: Fabaceae
- Subfamily: Caesalpinioideae
- (unranked): Dimorphandra Group A
- Genus: Stachyothyrsus; Harms (1897)

Synonyms
- Kaoue Pellegr. (1933)

Genus of legumes

Stachyothyrsus is a genus of flowering plants in the legume family, Fabaceae. It belongs to the subfamily Caesalpinioideae. It includes two species native to tropical Africa.

Two species are accepted:

- Stachyothyrsus stapfiana (A.Chev.) J.Léonard & Voorh. – Sierra Leone, Liberia, and Côte d'Ivoire
- Stachyothyrsus staudtii Harms – Cameroon, Gabon, and Democratic Republic of the Congo
