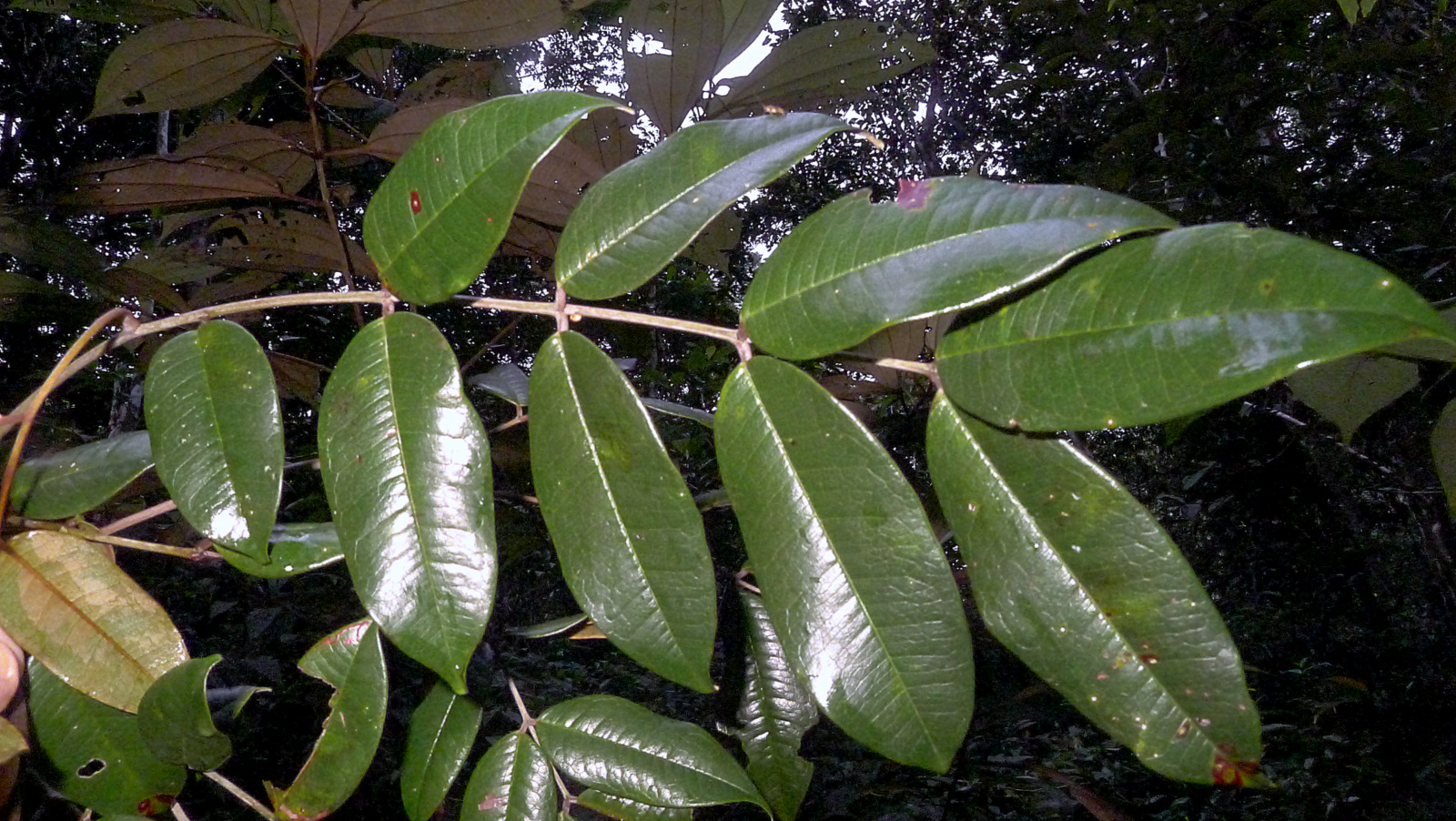

Scientific classification
- Kingdom: Plantae
- Clade: Tracheophytes
- Clade: Angiosperms
- Clade: Eudicots
- Clade: Rosids
- Order: Fabales
- Family: Fabaceae
- Subfamily: Caesalpinioideae
- Genus: Moldenhawera; Schrad. (1821)

Species
- 12; see text

Synonyms
- Dolichonema Nees (1821)

= Moldenhawera =

Genus of legumes

Moldenhawera is a genus of flowering plants in the legume family, Fabaceae. It includes 12 species of trees and shrubs endemic to eastern Brazil. They grow in diverse habitats, including restinga (tropical moist coastal forest, woodland, and scrub on podzolized sandy soils just above the beach line), coastal dunes, wooded grassland (cerrado), low mountain scrub on sandstone-derived soils, and rocky montane grassland (campo rupestre). It belongs to the subfamily Caesalpinioideae.

== Species ==
- Moldenhawera acuminata Afr.Fern. & P.Bezerra
- Moldenhawera blanchetiana Tul.
- Moldenhawera brasiliensis Yakovlev
- Moldenhawera congestiflora C.V.Vivas & L.P.Queiroz
- Moldenhawera emarginata (Spreng.) L.P.Queiroz & Allkin
- Moldenhawera floribunda Schrad.
- Moldenhawera intermedia G.P.Lewis & L.P.Queiroz
- Moldenhawera longipedicellata C.V.Vivas & L.P.Queiroz
- Moldenhawera lushnathiana Yakovlev
- Moldenhawera nutans L.P.Queiroz, G.P.Lewis & Allkin
- Moldenhawera papillanthera L.P.Queiroz, G.P.Lewis & Allkin
- Moldenhawera polysperma (Vell.) Stellfeld
