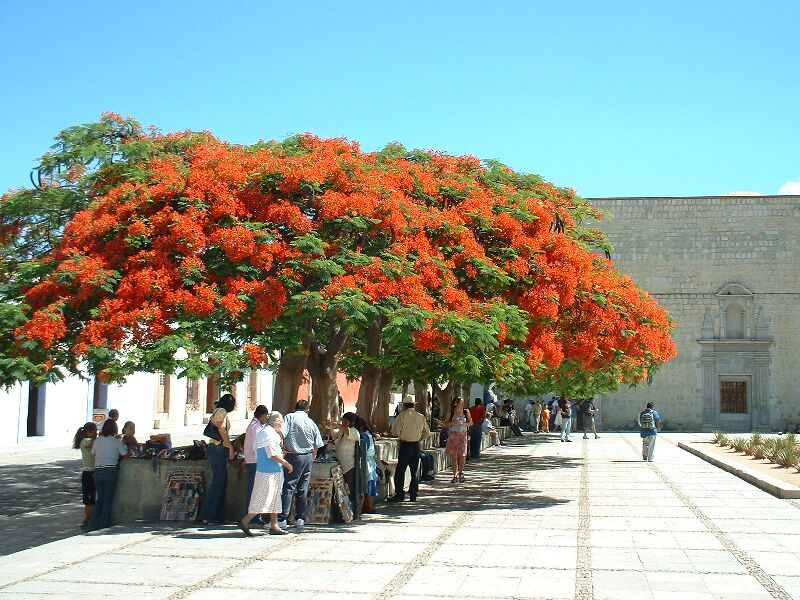
- Royal poinciana, Delonix regia

Scientific classification
- Kingdom: Plantae
- Clade: Tracheophytes
- Clade: Angiosperms
- Clade: Eudicots
- Clade: Rosids
- Order: Fabales
- Family: Fabaceae
- Subfamily: Caesalpinioideae; DC. 1825

Type genus
- Caesalpinia L.

Clades
- See text

Synonyms
- Cercidoideae Burmeist. 1837; GCM Clade Marazzi et al. 2012; MCC Clade Doyle 2011; Mimosoideae DC. 1825

= Caesalpinioideae =

Caesalpinioideae Temporal range: Middle Paleocene - recent

Subfamily of legumes

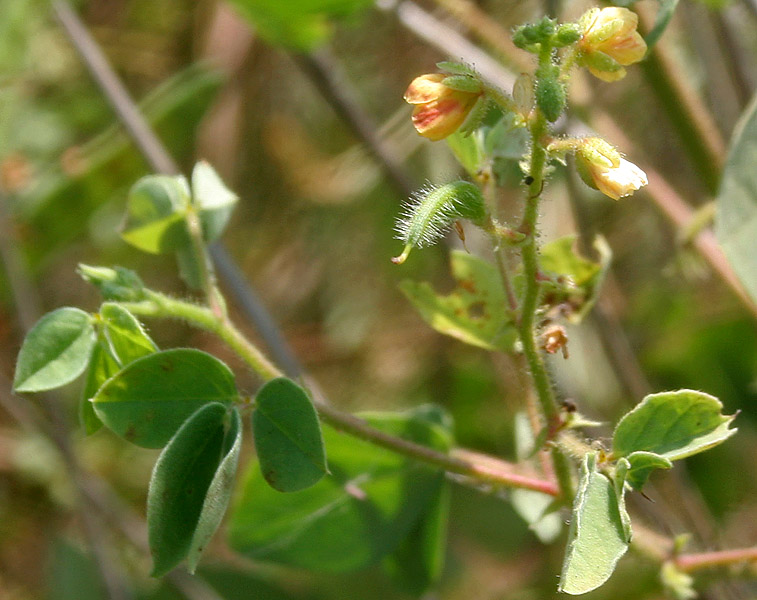
Chamaecrista absus

Caesalpinioideae is a botanical name at the rank of subfamily, placed in the large family Fabaceae or Leguminosae. Its name is formed from the generic name Caesalpinia. It is known also as the peacock flower subfamily. The Caesalpinioideae are mainly trees distributed in the moist tropics, but include such temperate species as the honeylocust (Gleditsia triacanthos) and Kentucky coffeetree (Gymnocladus dioicus). It has the following clade-based definition:

The most inclusive crown clade containing Arcoa gonavensis Urb. and Mimosa pudica L., but not Bobgunnia fistuloides (Harms) J. H. Kirkbr. & Wiersema, Duparquetia orchidacea Baill., or Poeppigia procera C.Presl

In some classifications, for example the Cronquist system, the group is recognized at the rank of family, Caesalpiniaceae.

== Characteristics ==
- Specialised extrafloral nectaries often present on the petiole and / or on the primary and secondary rachis, usually between pinnae or leaflet pairs
- Leaves commonly bipinnate, unipinnate, paripinnate, phyllode is found in parkinsonia
- Inflorescences : Panicle ( raceme of racemes ) or compound raceme, globose, spicate.
- Aestivation : ascending imbricate
- Anthers often with a stipitate or sessile apical gland
- Pollen commonly in tetrads, bitetrads or polyrads
- Seeds usually with an open or closed pleurogram on both faces
- Root nodules variably present and indeterminate
- 10 Stamens, aside from various core mimosoid genera bearing a few factors more

== Taxonomy ==
- Caesalpinieae Clade
- Cassieae Clade
  - Batesia Spruce
  - Cassia L.
  - Chamaecrista Moench
  - Melanoxylum Schott
  - Recordoxylon Ducke
  - Senna Mill.
  - Vouacapoua Aubl.
- Dimorphandra Group A
  - Burkea Benth.
  - Campsiandra Benth.
  - Dimorphandra Schott pro parte
  - Dinizia Ducke
  - Mora Benth.
  - Stachyothyrsus Harms
- Dimorphandra Group B
  - Dimorphandra Schott pro parte
  - Diptychandra Tul.
  - Erythrophleum Afzel. ex R.Br.
  - Moldenhawera Schrad.
  - Pachyelasma Harms
  - Sympetalandra Stapf
- Mimosoid Clade

- Peltophorum Clade
  - Bussea Harms
  - Colvillea Bojer ex Hook.
  - Conzattia Rose
  - Delonix Raf.
  - Heteroflorum M. Sousa
  - Lemuropisum H.Perrier
  - Parkinsonia L.
  - Peltophorum (Vogel) Benth.
  - Schizolobium Vogel
- Tachigali Clade
  - Arapatiella Rizzini & A.Mattos
  - Jacqueshuberia Ducke
  - Tachigali Aubl. (including Sclerolobium)
- Umtiza Clade
  - Acrocarpus Wight & Arn.
  - Arcoa Urb.
  - Ceratonia L.
  - Gleditsia L.
  - Gymnocladus Lam.
  - Tetrapterocarpon Humbert
  - Umtiza Sim
- Unassigned
  - Pterogyne Tul.

== Phylogenetics ==
Caesalpinioideae, as it was traditionally circumscribed, was paraphyletic. Several molecular phylogenies in the early 2000s showed that the other two subfamilies of Fabaceae (Faboideae and Mimosoideae) were both nested within Caesalpinioideae. Consequently, the subfamilies of Fabaceae were reorganized to make them monophyletic. Caesalpinioideae, as currently defined, contains the following subclades:

- Fabales
  - Faboideae (outgroup)
  - Caesalpinioideae
    - Umtiza clade
    - - - Cassieae clade
        - - Pterogyne
          - Caesalpinieae clade
      - - - Dimorphandra group A
          - - Tachigali clade
            - Peltophorum clade
        - Group B includes the mimosoid clade
