= Dicliptera maclearii =

Scientific classification
- Kingdom: Plantae
- Clade: Tracheophytes
- Clade: Angiosperms
- Clade: Eudicots
- Clade: Asterids
- Order: Lamiales
- Family: Acanthaceae
- Genus: Dicliptera
- Species: D. maclearii

Binomial name
- Dicliptera maclearii Hemsl.

Species of flowering plant

Dicliptera maclearii is a species of plant in the family Acanthaceae which is endemic to Christmas Island, an Australian territory in the north-eastern Indian Ocean. Its specific epithet honours John Maclear, captain of the survey vessel HMS Flying Fish, which visited Christmas Island in 1886.

== Description ==
Dicliptera maclearii is an erect herb with small pink flowers growing to 1 m in height. Its leaves are lanceolate to ovate, acuminate or spine-tipped, 20–70 mm long and 5–30 mm wide. It closest relative is D. ciliata.

== Distribution and habitat ==
Found only on Christmas Island, it is common in places on the lower terraces of the island, including at Flying Fish Cove and North West Point.
