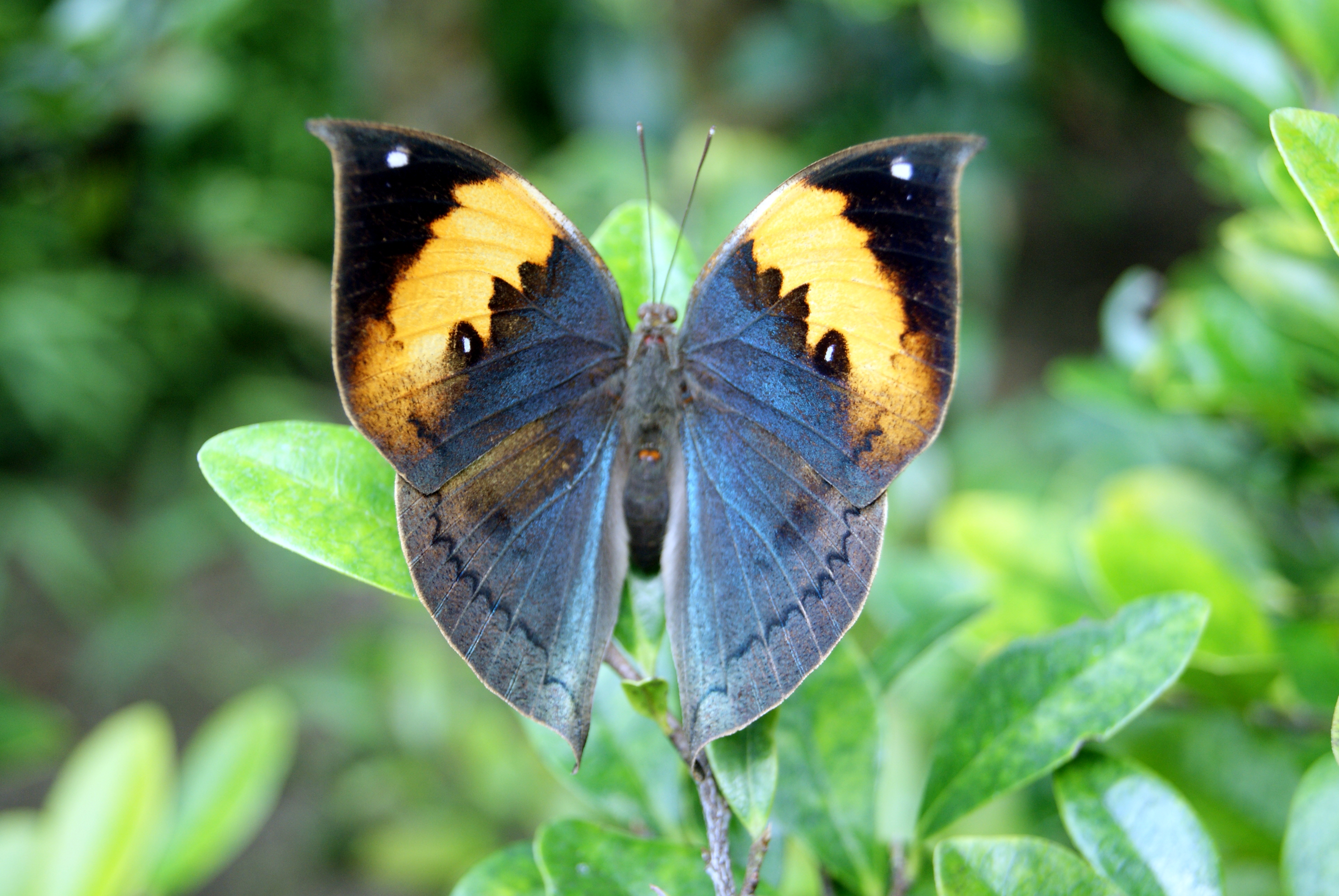
- Upperside
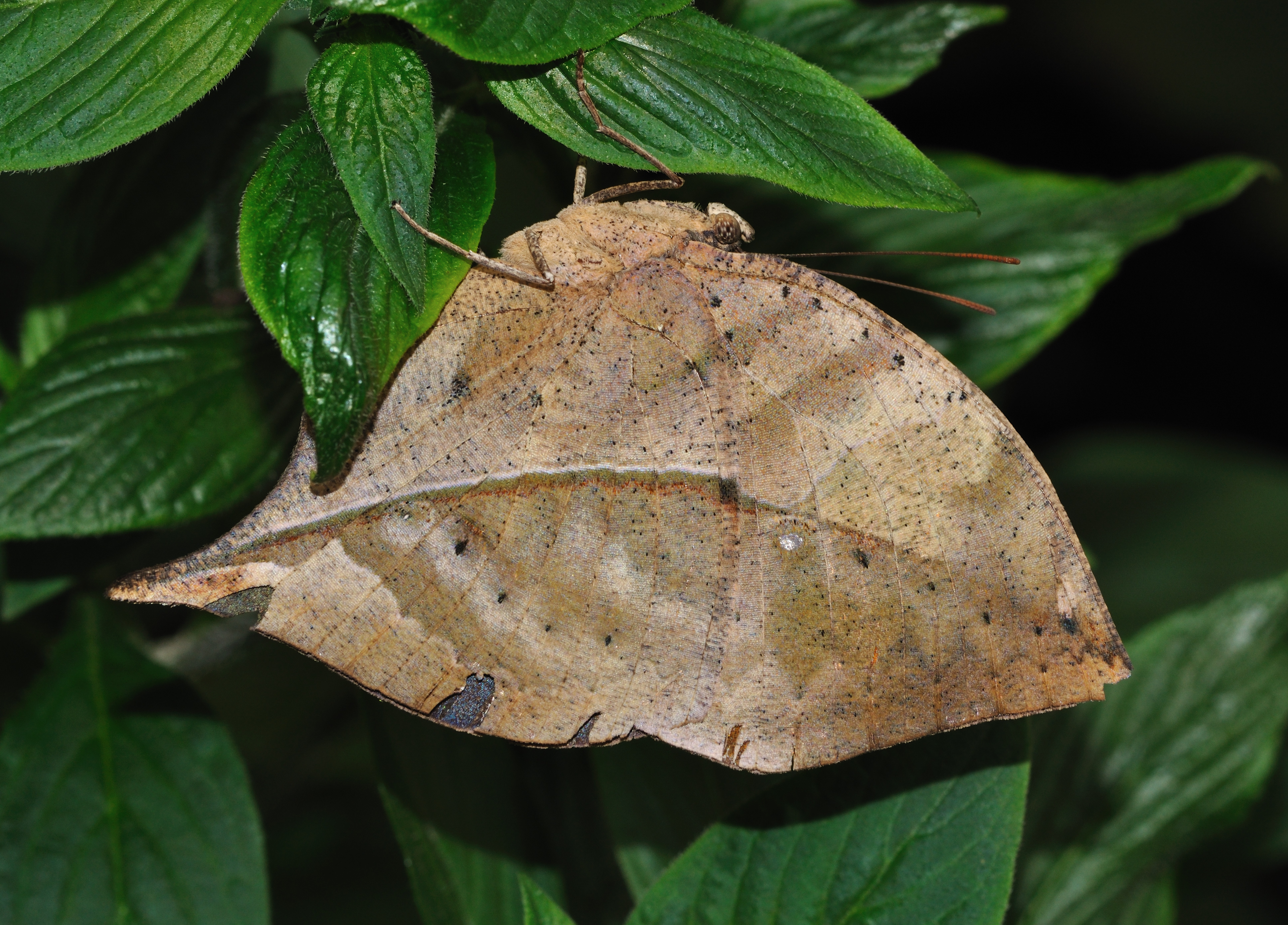
- Underside

Scientific classification
- Kingdom: Animalia
- Phylum: Arthropoda
- Clade: Pancrustacea
- Class: Insecta
- Order: Lepidoptera
- Family: Nymphalidae
- Genus: Kallima
- Species: K. inachus

Binomial name
- Kallima inachus (Doyère, 1840)

= Kallima inachus =

Orange oakleaf

Species of butterfly known for resembling a dry leaf when its wings are closed

Kallima inachus, the orange oakleaf, Indian oakleaf or dead leaf, is a nymphalid butterfly found in Tropical Asia from Pakistan to Japan. With wings closed, it closely resembles a dry leaf with dark veins and is a commonly cited example of camouflage.

== Description ==
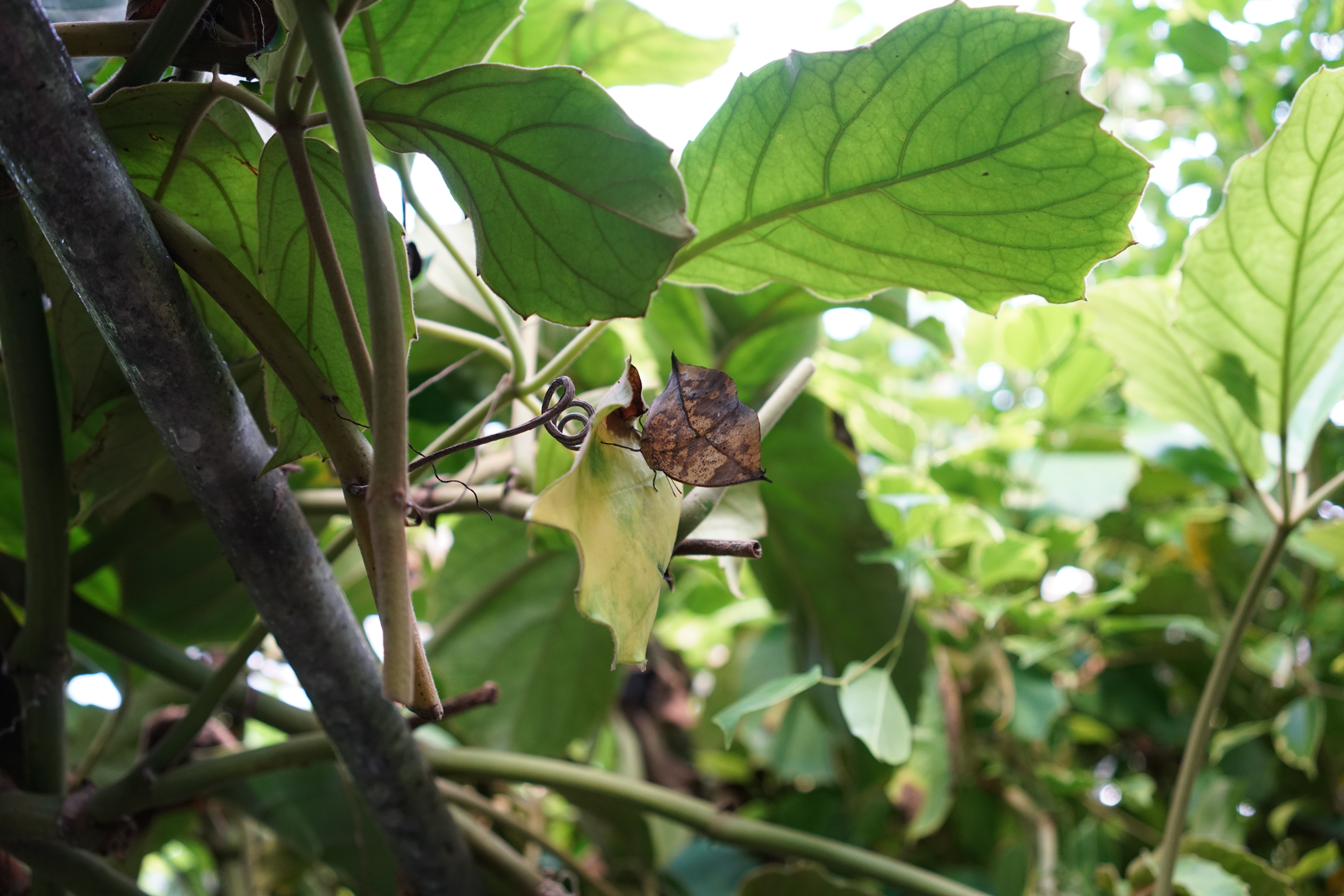
With wings closed

The butterfly wings are shaped like a leaf when in the closed position. When the wings are closed, only the cryptic underside markings are visible, which consists of irregular patterns and striations in many shades of biscuit, buff, browns, yellow, and black. The veins are darkened and resemble the veins of a leaf. The resemblance to a dried leaf, a masquerade, is extremely realistic and gives the genus its common names, the oakleaf or dead leaf.

When the wings are open, the forewing exhibits a black apex, an orange discal band and a deep blue base. There are two white oculi, one along the margin of the apical black band, and the other bordering the orange and deep blue areas. The hindwing is more uniformly blue but diffused with brown patches along the termen.

Male and female butterflies are similar except that the female is generally larger and has the apex of the forewing protrude to form a longer point. Females also tend to be more reddish on the underside and the yellow mottled markings tend to be paler. The butterfly exhibits polyphenism, i.e. there are specific dry-season and wet-season forms which differ in colouration and size; the wet-season form tends to be smaller.

The wingspan of the butterfly ranges from 85 to 110 millimetres (3.3 to 4.3 in).

Detailed description as given in Bingham (1905).

=== Dry-season form ===
The forewing discoidal cell, interspace 1a, 1 to near apex, basal half of 2, and extreme bases of 3 and 4 rich violet blue, the borders of the discocellulars and the interspaces of veins 2, 3 and 4 are black, spread diffusely outwards in interspaces 1a and 1. A very broad oblique discal orange band from costa to apices of interspaces 1 and 2, this orange band is sprinkled with bluish black scales; apical third of wing velvety purpurescent (purple) black; a hyaline (glass-like) transverse spot near middle of interspace 2, and a subtriangular similar small preapical spot. Hindwing more uniform violescent blue; the costal margin and apex very broadly brown, somewhat densely irrorated (sprinkled) with dusky violescent black scales; dorsal margin brown; a ridge of long brownish hairs along vein 1 spreading on to the dorsal margin. Forewings and hindwings crossed by a subterminal dusky zigzag line commencing about the middle of interspace 3 in the forewing, and most conspicuous on the hindwing.

Underside very closely resembles a dry leaf; ground colour very variable, but usually some shade of brown (rusty, greyish, and yellowish browns being the most common), always with scattered dark dots or little dark patches having the appearance of fungus-like or lichenous growths so common on dead leaves in the tropics. When the insect closes its wings over its back the likeness to a dead leaf is most striking, and is heightened by a straight transverse, narrow, dark band running from the apex of the forewing to the tornus of the hindwing, often with oblique narrower similar bands or lines given off from it, all simulating very closely the midrib and lateral veins of a leaf. The hindwing in all specimens has a more or less obsolescent or faint series of postdiscal ocelli, traces of which are also apparent on the forewing. Antennae dark brown; head, thorax, and abdomen dark violescent brown; beneath, the palpi, thorax and abdomen paler earthy brown.

=== Wet-season form ===
Smaller than the dry-season form, but very similar to it. The colours are richer and darker, and the orange discal band more broadly bordered with black on the inner side. On the underside some of the specimens from areas of heavy rainfall have the ground colour very dark ochraceous brown.

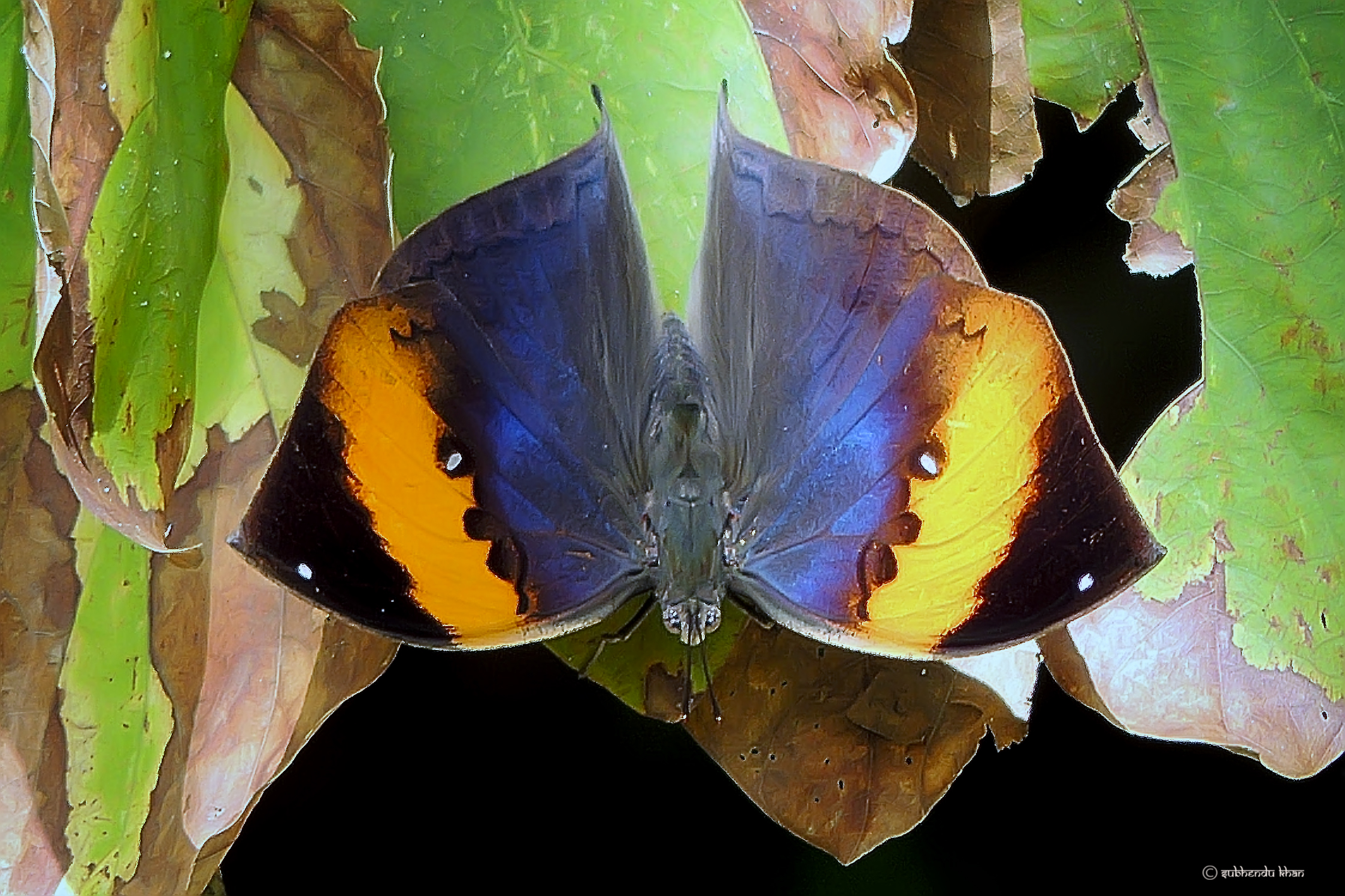

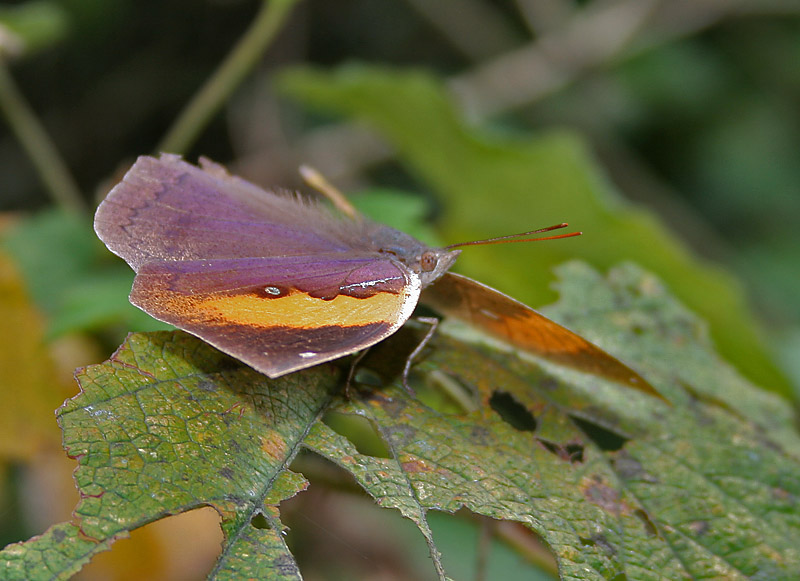
Dry-season, female, upperside

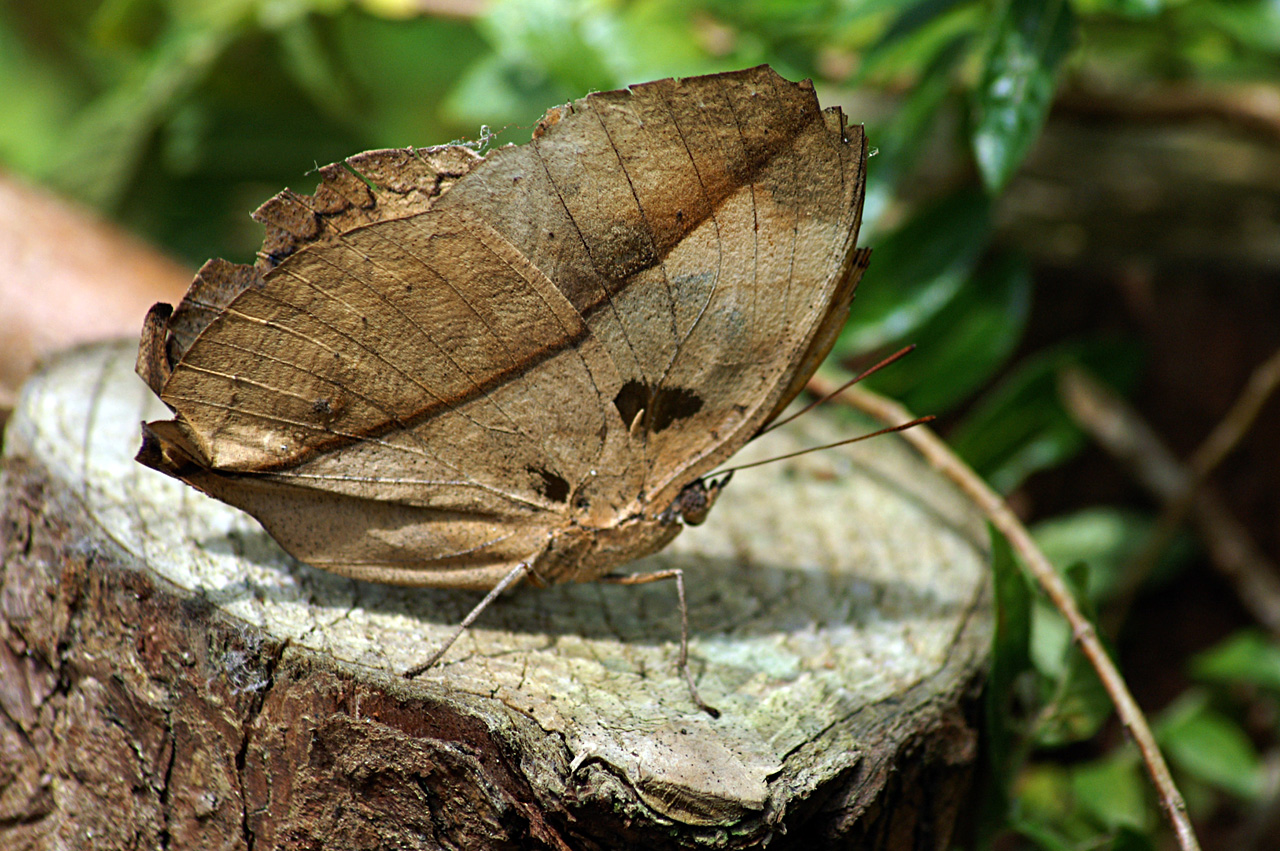
Dry-season, female, underside

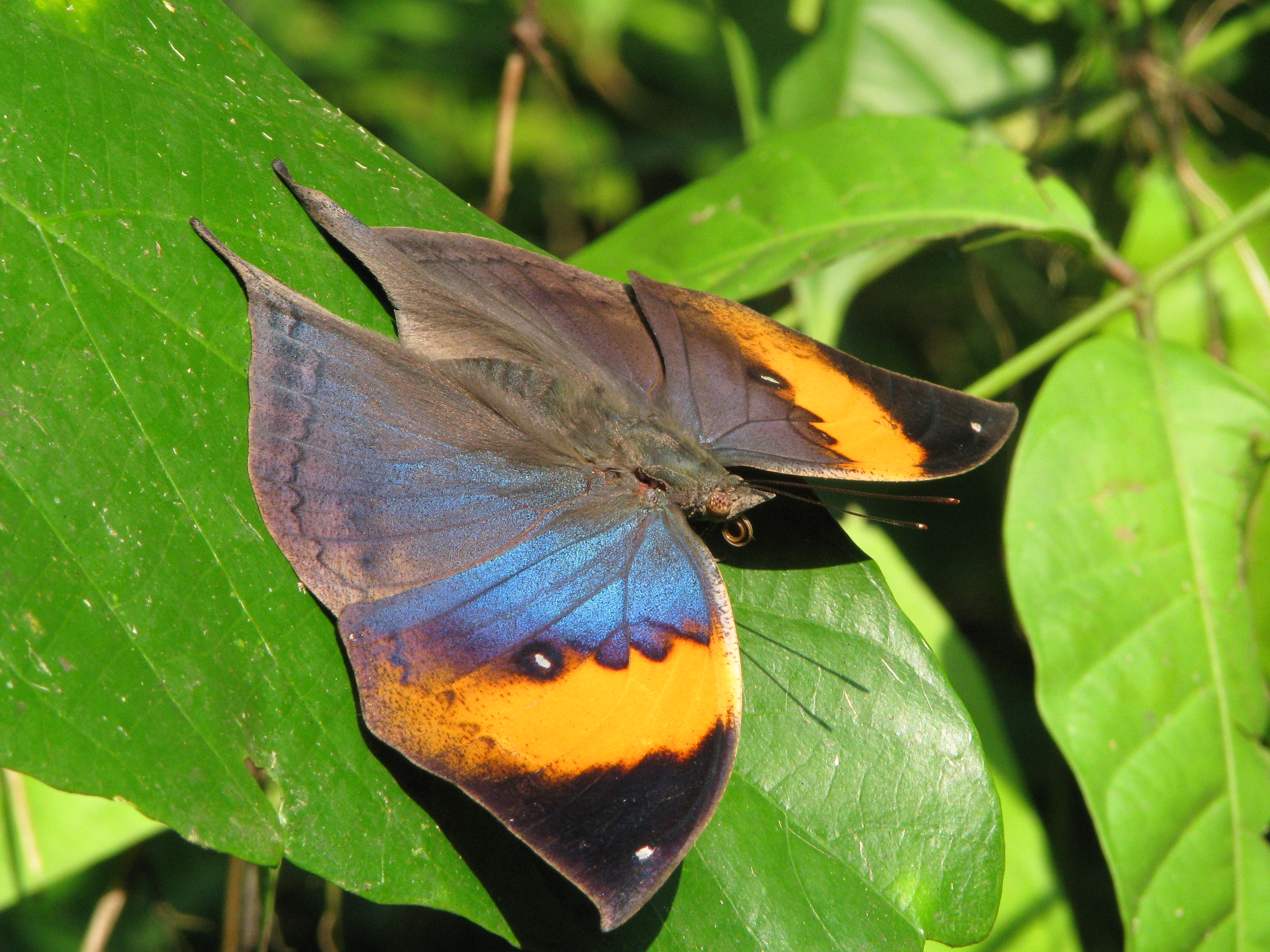
Wet-season, female, upperside

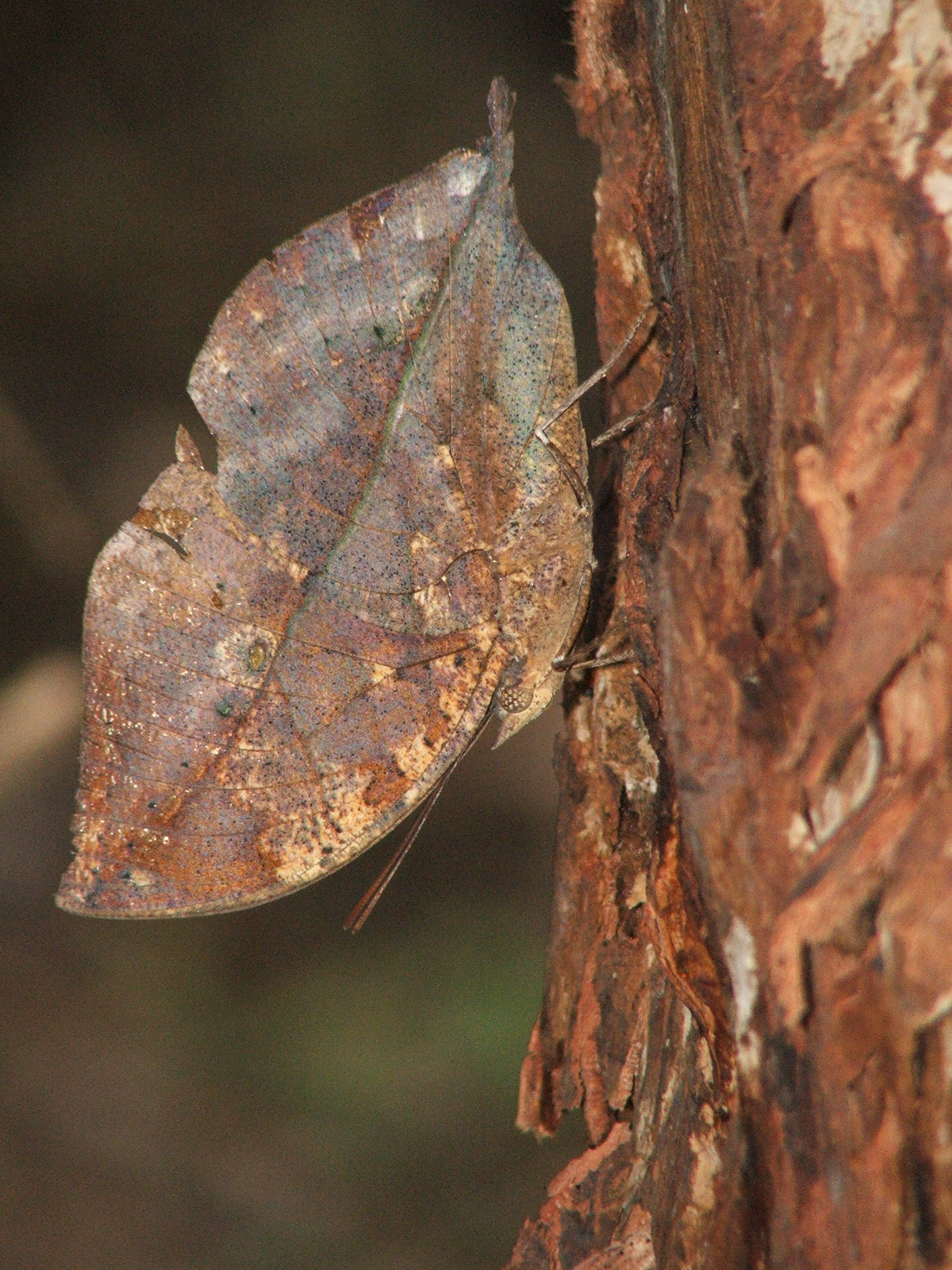
Wet-season, female, underside

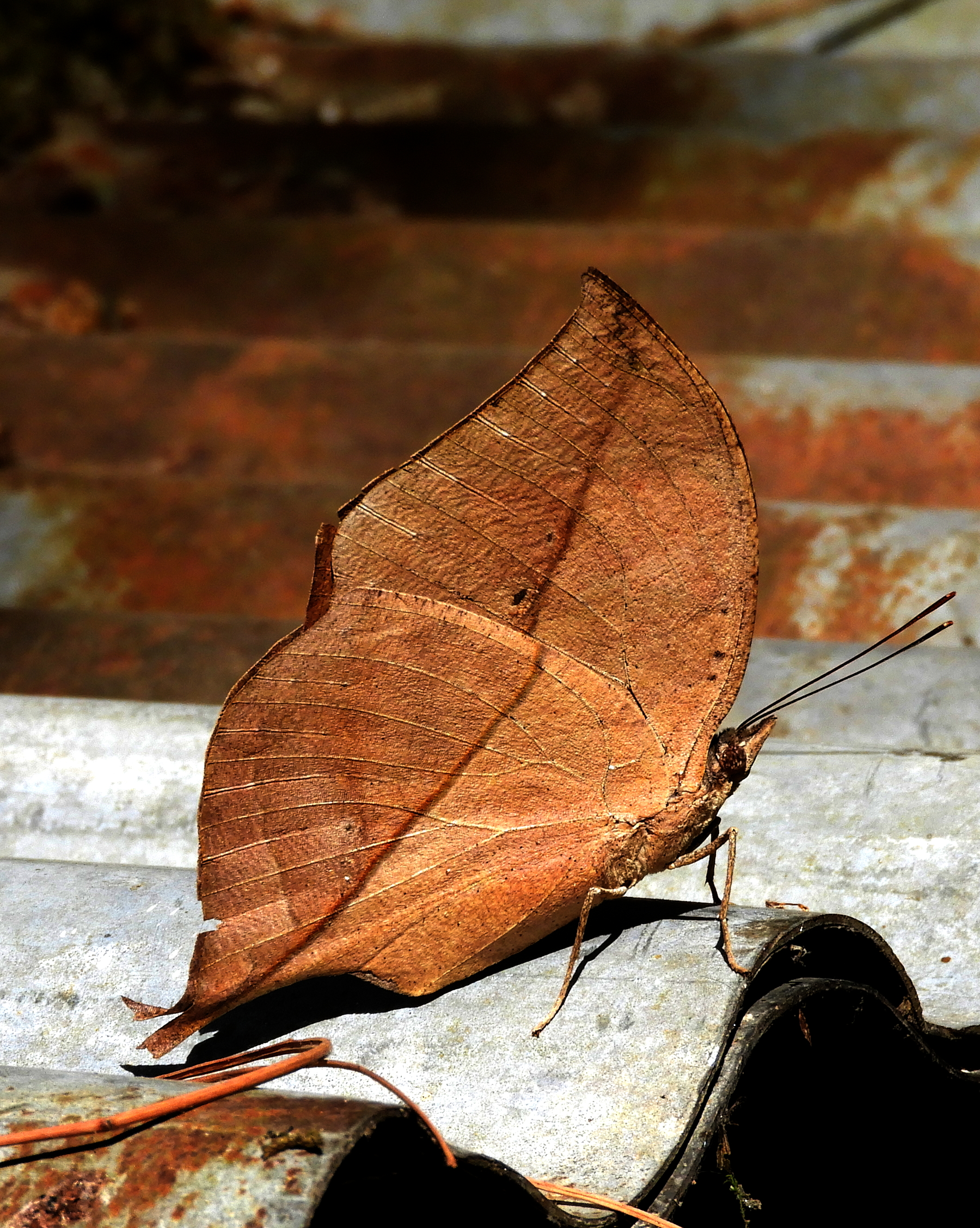
Dry-season at Sattal

== Distribution ==
The orange oakleaf is found in India, Pakistan, Nepal, Bhutan, Bangladesh, and Myanmar, down to Tenasserim Hills. In Southeast Asia it occurs in southern China, Thailand, Laos, Taiwan, and Vietnam.

In Pakistan, they are found in the lower Himalayan regions in Islamabad, Abbottabad and Azad Kashmir.

In India, the butterfly flies in the Himalayas at low elevations, from Jammu and Kashmir, through Garhwal and Kumaon to West Bengal, Sikkim, Arunachal Pradesh, and other states of the northeast. It is also found in central and peninsular India; it flies in Madhya Pradesh, Jharkhand, Chhattisgarh, Orissa and Andhra Pradesh; i.e. along the central Indian highlands to Pachmarhi and Amarkantak, the Western Ghats south to Bhimashankar, and in the Eastern Ghats north of the river Godavari.

The status of the butterfly in India is "not rare", while in China, the butterfly is considered "rare".

The orange oakleaf is encountered up to an altitude of 1,800 metres (5,900 ft) in the hills; though Mark Alexander Wynter-Blyth records it as being encountered up to 8,000 feet (2,400 m) in regions of heavy rainfall in thickly forested mountainous and hilly regions. In the Kumaon Himalayas, K. inachus has been recorded to inhabit tropical deciduous forest between 400 and 1,400 metres (1,300 and 4,600 ft) and subtropical evergreen forest above 1,200 metres (3,900 ft). In a survey of Chongqing municipality, China, carried out from 1998 to 2004, K. inachis was found to inhabit moist broad-leaf forests.

== Habits ==
The orange oakleaf is a powerful flier and usually flies in dense forests with good rainfall, amongst undergrowth and along stream beds. It is attracted to tree sap and over-ripe fruit, and is also known to mud-puddle.

Much pursued by birds, when in danger the orange oakleaf flies erratically, soon dropping down into the foliage and occupying a stationary pose with wings closed, so that the birds are very often quite unable to find them. In such a pose, the butterfly resembles a dried leaf and is perfectly camouflaged.

The natural enemies of the orange oakleaf include birds, ants, spiders, wasps (including Trichogramma species), and some bacteria.

== Life cycle ==
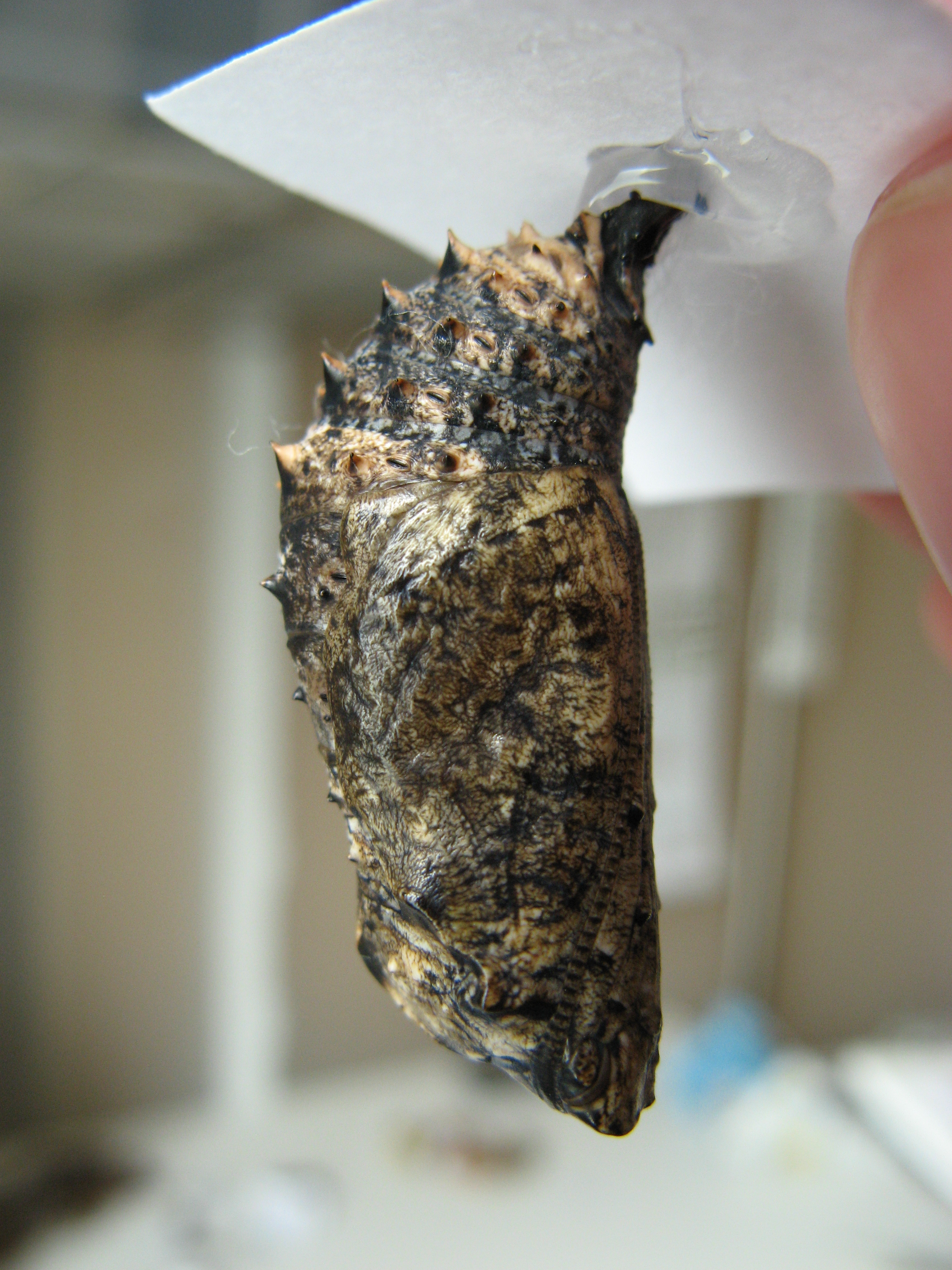
Chrysalis of orange oakleaf

In the Himalayas, the butterfly is multivoltine and flies from April to October. Kehimkar (2009) records the butterfly on the wing in India from April to December.

In Chongqing one generation has been recorded as taking about 50 days from egg to imago. The egg period lasted about 6 days, the larval period 36 days, and involved 5 to 6 instars (usually 5) and with the pupation lasting about 10 days. The caterpillars bred successfully at temperatures of 22 to 31.5 °C (71.6 to 88.7 °F) and relative humidity of 48 to 98%. The larval period could be reduced from 36 days in natural conditions to 16.8 to 23 days in captive breeding.

In another study in China, in the Emei mountains (altitude 450 to 1,200 metres (1,480 to 3,940 ft)), the butterfly has three generations a year in which the first and second generations predominate. Most of the second generation, along with a few of the third and sometimes the first generation, go through the winter as diapaused adults. Most second generation adults diapause in early July.

Butterflies of the first generation, reared in captivity in the Emei mountain study, completed their life cycle in 45 to 54 days, with eggs taking 4 to 6 days, caterpillars 21 to 36 days, and pupation 10 to 15 days. The breeding took place in temperatures between 26.4 and 28.2 °C (79.5 and 82.8 °F) and humidity of 63.2% to 84.7% on average.

Investigations in an artificial climate chamber reveal that photoperiod and temperature play a role in the larval development and survival rate of the larvae of K. inachus. Photoperiods affect the development period of larvae at 20 °C (68 °F) but not at 25 °C (77 °F) and 30 °C (86 °F). As temperature increased from 20 °C to 25 °C and 30 °C, the developmental periods of larvae reduced under the same photoperiod to 31.7 to 36.0 days, 26.37 to 27.4 days and 21.0 to 21.5 days, respectively.

Increasing temperature also made an increase in the survival rate under different photoperiods. The survival rate of larvae at 20 °C, 25 °C, and 30 °C was 80%–92%, 75%–95%, and 55%–85%, respectively. The low survival rate at 30 °C under most photoperiod gradients requires that artificial breeding of K. inachus be done below this temperature.

=== Food plants ===
The larvae are polyphagous, feeding on plants from many families. The list of food plants include:

- Urticaceae – Girardinia diversifolia in India
- Polygonaceae – Polygonum orientale in India
- Rosaceae – Prunus persica in India
- Acanthaceae:
  - Dicliptera chinensis in China
  - Hygrophila salicifolia in Japan
  - Lepidagathis formosensis in Taiwan
  - Ruellia capitataus (syn. Strobilanthes capitatus & S. pentastemonoides) in India and Taiwan
  - Rostellularia pracumbens in China
  - Strobilanthes species, in China and Japan, including:
    - S. flaccidifolius in Japan
    - S. glandulifera in Japan
    - S. tashiroi in Japan

=== Egg ===
In captive breeding in a net garden, females have been recorded to lay 245.7 eggs on average. This has been increased to 279.8 eggs per female by supplementing nutrition.

=== Larva ===
The late stage caterpillar is velvety black, covered with rather long yellowish hair. It has a large number of reddish spines; eleven on each segment, with one dorsal, two subdorsal and three lateral on each side.

=== Pupa ===
The pupa is simple. It has a gently keeled thorax. The abdomen displays a series of small conical points dorsally. The colour is light brownish and the pupa is embellished with slaty irrorations.

== Research ==
The butterfly is considered to be rare in China and consequently much research in its captive breeding has been done. The mitochondrial DNA has been sequenced and found to be 15,183 base pair in size. In addition, the butterfly has been a subject in research on diapause.

== See also ==
- Kallima paralekta
