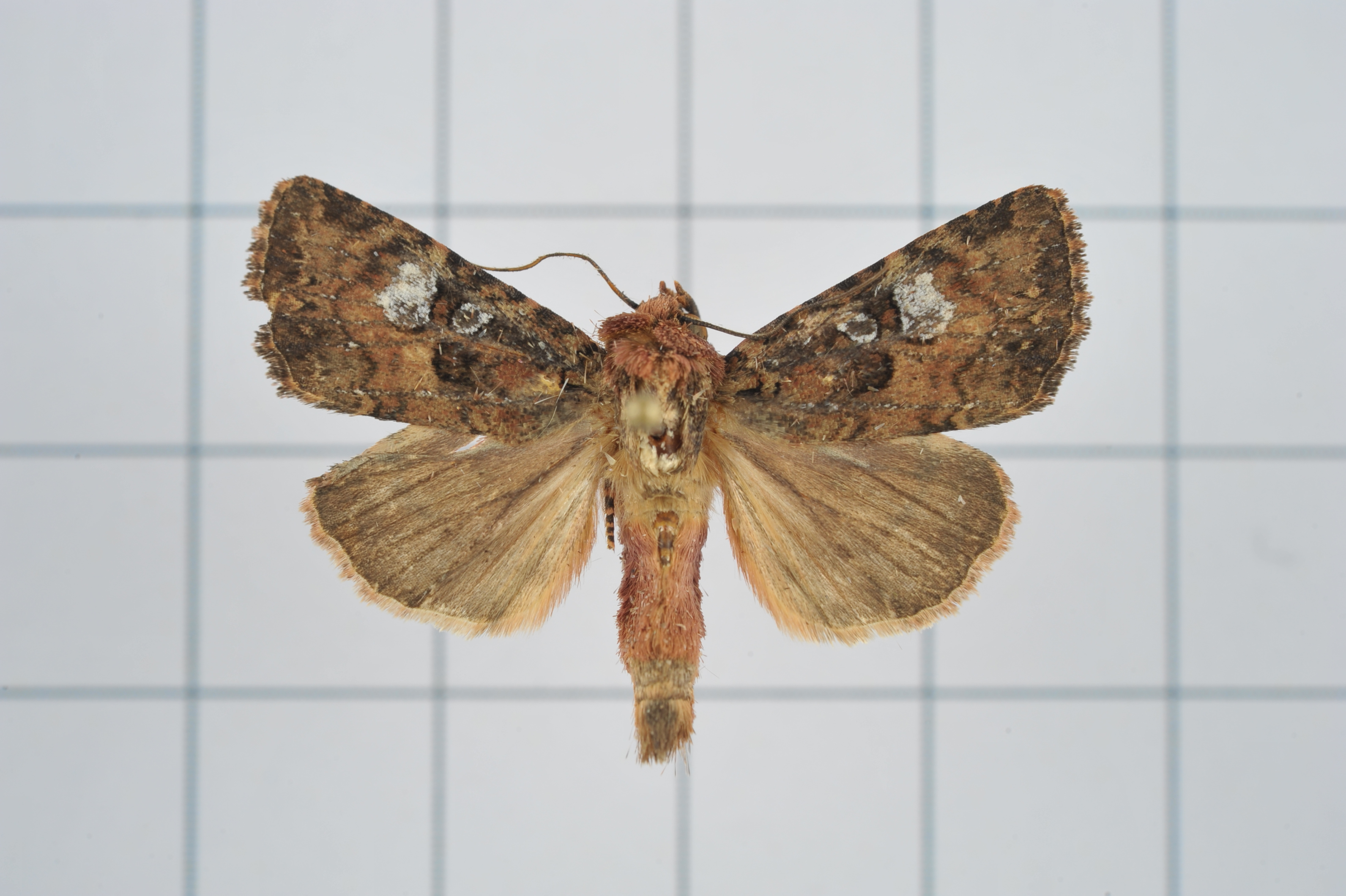

Scientific classification
- Kingdom: Animalia
- Phylum: Arthropoda
- Class: Insecta
- Order: Lepidoptera
- Superfamily: Noctuoidea
- Family: Noctuidae
- Genus: Feliniopsis
- Species: F. indistans

Binomial name
- Feliniopsis indistans (Guenée, 1852)

Synonyms
- Hadena indistans Guenée, 1852; Hadena subdistans Guenée, 1852

= Feliniopsis indistans =

Species of moth

Feliniopsis indistans is a moth of the family Noctuidae first described by Achille Guenée in 1852. It is found in India, Sri Lanka, Hong Kong, Japan and Taiwan.

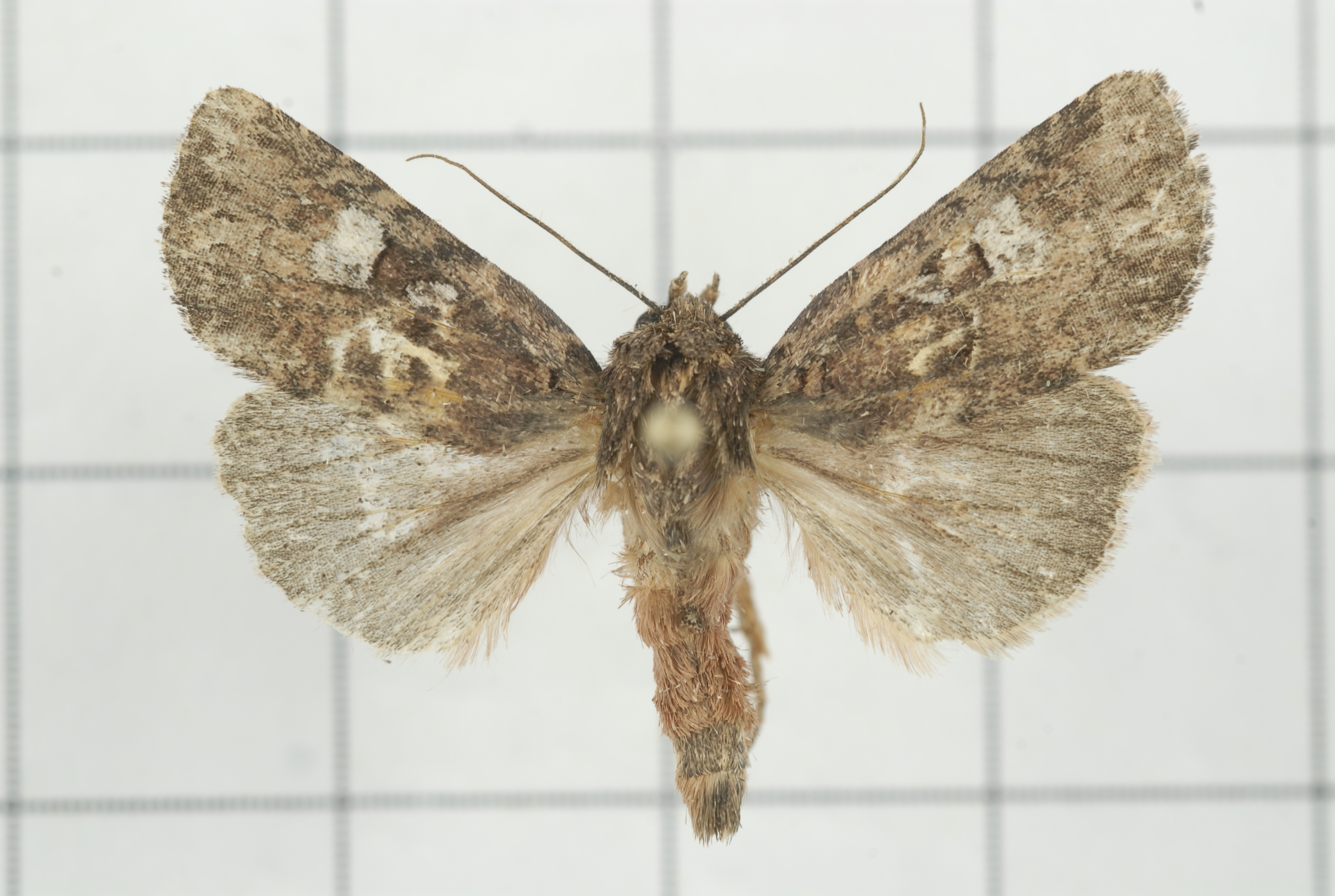

Adult wingspan 34 mm. Palpi upturned. Head, thorax, abdomen, forewings all pale reddish brown. Indistinct, waved, double subbasal, antemedial and postmedial dark lines on forewing. There are 3-4 oval brown spots which gives dark appearance to half wing. Orbicular and reniform indistinct. A submarginal series of lunules. Hindwings pale fuscous.

Larval host plants are Adhatoda and Dicliptera chinensis.
