= Dicliptera srisailamica =

Scientific classification
- Kingdom: Plantae
- Clade: Tracheophytes
- Clade: Angiosperms
- Clade: Eudicots
- Clade: Asterids
- Order: Lamiales
- Family: Acanthaceae
- Genus: Dicliptera
- Species: D. srisailamica

Binomial name
- Dicliptera srisailamica Rasingam, Nethaji & Susmitha

Species of flowering plant

Dicliptera srisailamica is a species of flowering plant in the genus of Dicliptera. This species is closely related to Dicliptera beddomei but shows distinct differences in various traits.
