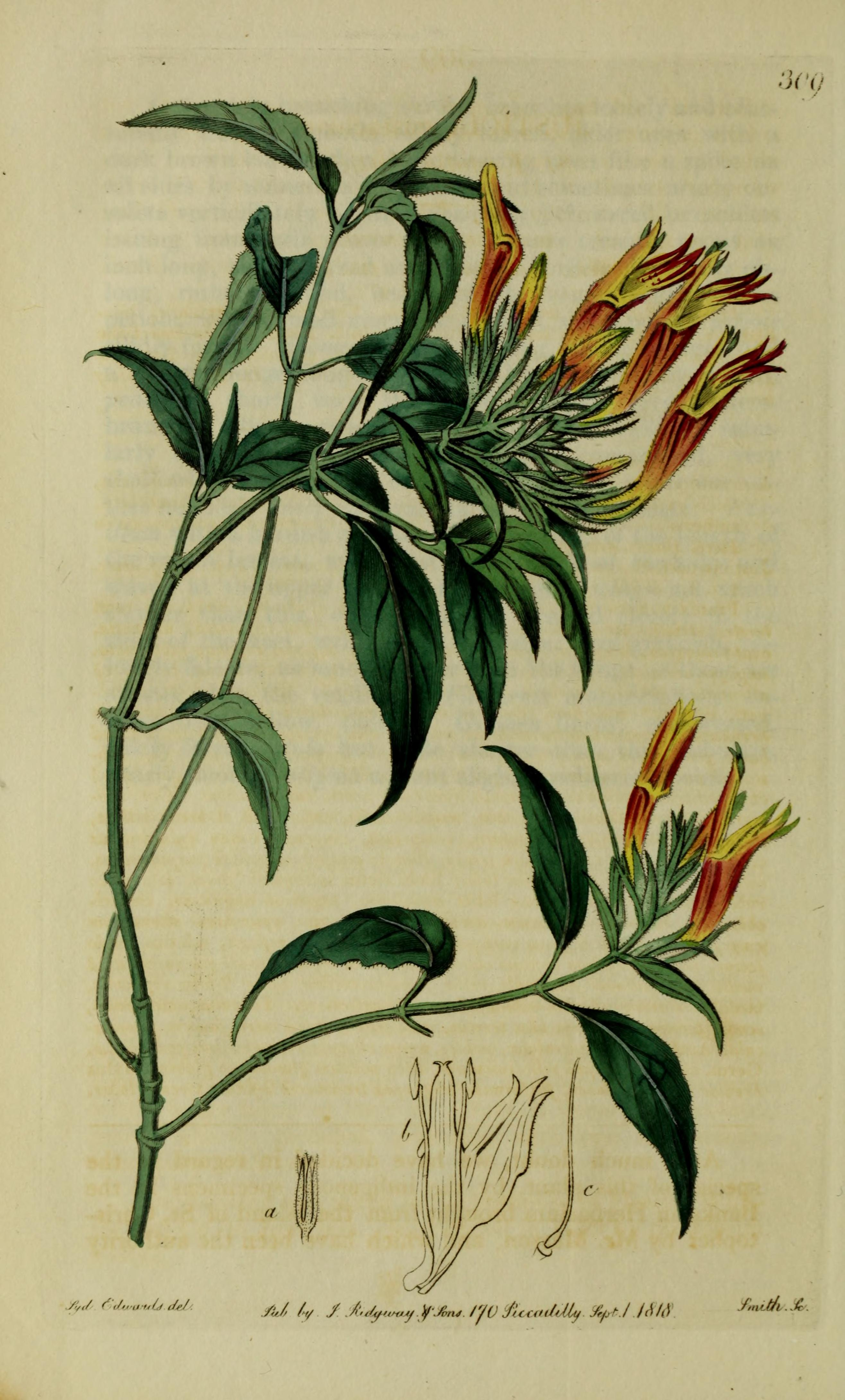

Scientific classification
- Kingdom: Plantae
- Clade: Tracheophytes
- Clade: Angiosperms
- Clade: Eudicots
- Clade: Asterids
- Order: Lamiales
- Family: Acanthaceae
- Genus: Dicliptera
- Species: D. sexangularis

Binomial name
- Dicliptera sexangularis (L.) Juss.

= Dicliptera sexangularis =

Species of plant

Dicliptera sexangularis, the sixangle foldwing, is a flowering plant in the genus Dicliptera and the family Acanthaceae. It has red blooms and is a perennial. In the United States it grows in Florida and Texas. It has also been reported in parts of the Caribbean, Central America, and Venezuela. It is a dicot.
