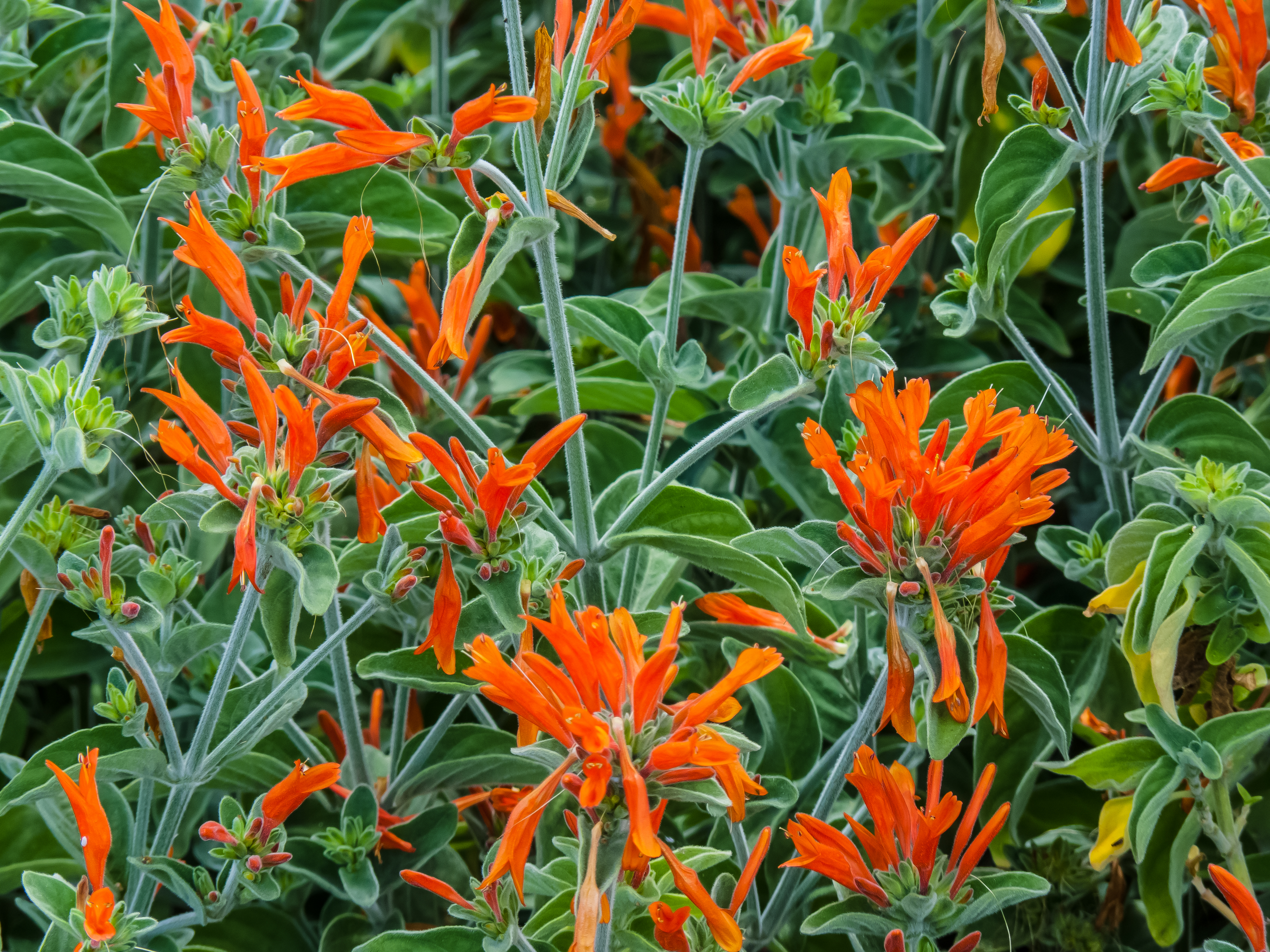

Scientific classification
- Kingdom: Plantae
- Clade: Tracheophytes
- Clade: Angiosperms
- Clade: Eudicots
- Clade: Asterids
- Order: Lamiales
- Family: Acanthaceae
- Genus: Dicliptera
- Species: D. squarrosa

Binomial name
- Dicliptera squarrosa Nees (1847)

Synonyms
- Synonymy: Diapedium pohlianum (Nees) Kuntze (1891); Diapedium sericeum (Nees) Kuntze (1891); Diapedium squarrosum (Nees) Kuntze (1891); Diapedium tweedieanum (Nees) Kuntze (1891); Dicliptera deltica Bridar. (1948); Dicliptera lutea Bridar. (1948); Dicliptera pohliana Nees (1847); Dicliptera sericea Nees (1847); Dicliptera squarrosa var. hirsuta Nees (1847); Dicliptera suberecta (André) Bremek. (1943); Dicliptera tweedieana Nees (1847); Dicliptera tweedieana f. flaviflora Stuck. ex Seckt (1930); Dicliptera tweedieana var. microphylla Nees (1847); Jacobinia suberecta André (1900); Justicia abnormis Pohl ex Nees (1847)

= Dicliptera squarrosa =

Species of flowering plant

Dicliptera squarrosa, also known as firecracker plant and Hummingbird plant, is a species of flowering plant in the acanthus family, Acanthaceae. A scrambling subshrub, it is native to central South America.

== Description ==
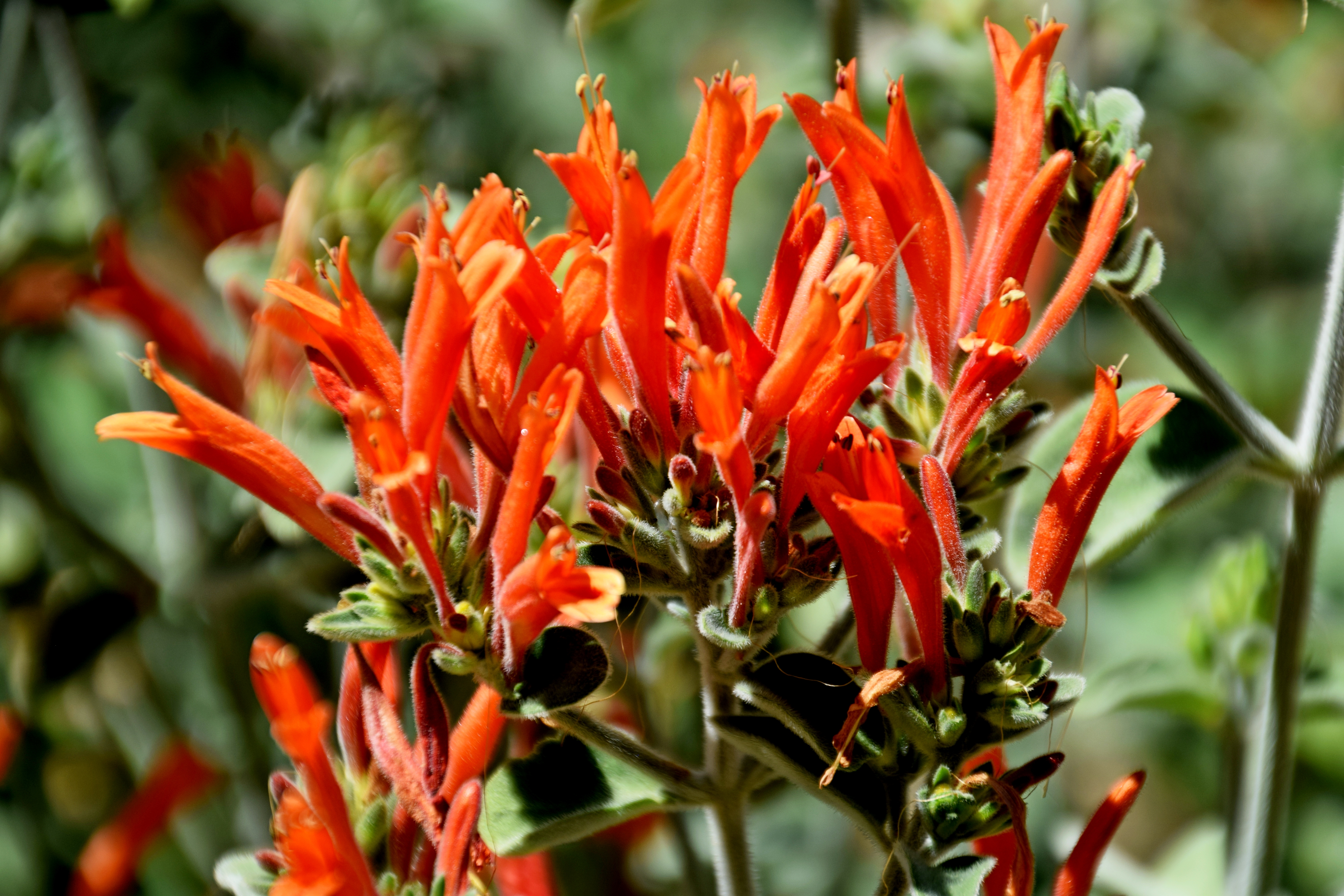
Flowers up close

It is a drought tolerant, subshrub approximately 60 cm in height and a width of 45 cm, with an upright to drooping habit, and thin stems. The opposite, hairy leaves are 4 to 8 cm long, oval, dull or velvety medium green, and covered with grey down.

The vibrant reddish-orange flowers, 2 to 4 cm long, are borne in axillary and terminal clusters, which blossom throughout the summer and into autumn. In addition to butterflies, its flowers attract hummingbirds, hence its common name.

=== Name ===
The genus name is from the Greek diklis which means double-folding, and 'pteron' meaning wing, denotating the two wing-like divisions in the capsule. The species name means with parts spreading or bent at the extremities. This plant is cited in Flora Brasiliensis by Carl Friedrich Philipp von Martius.

== Distribution ==
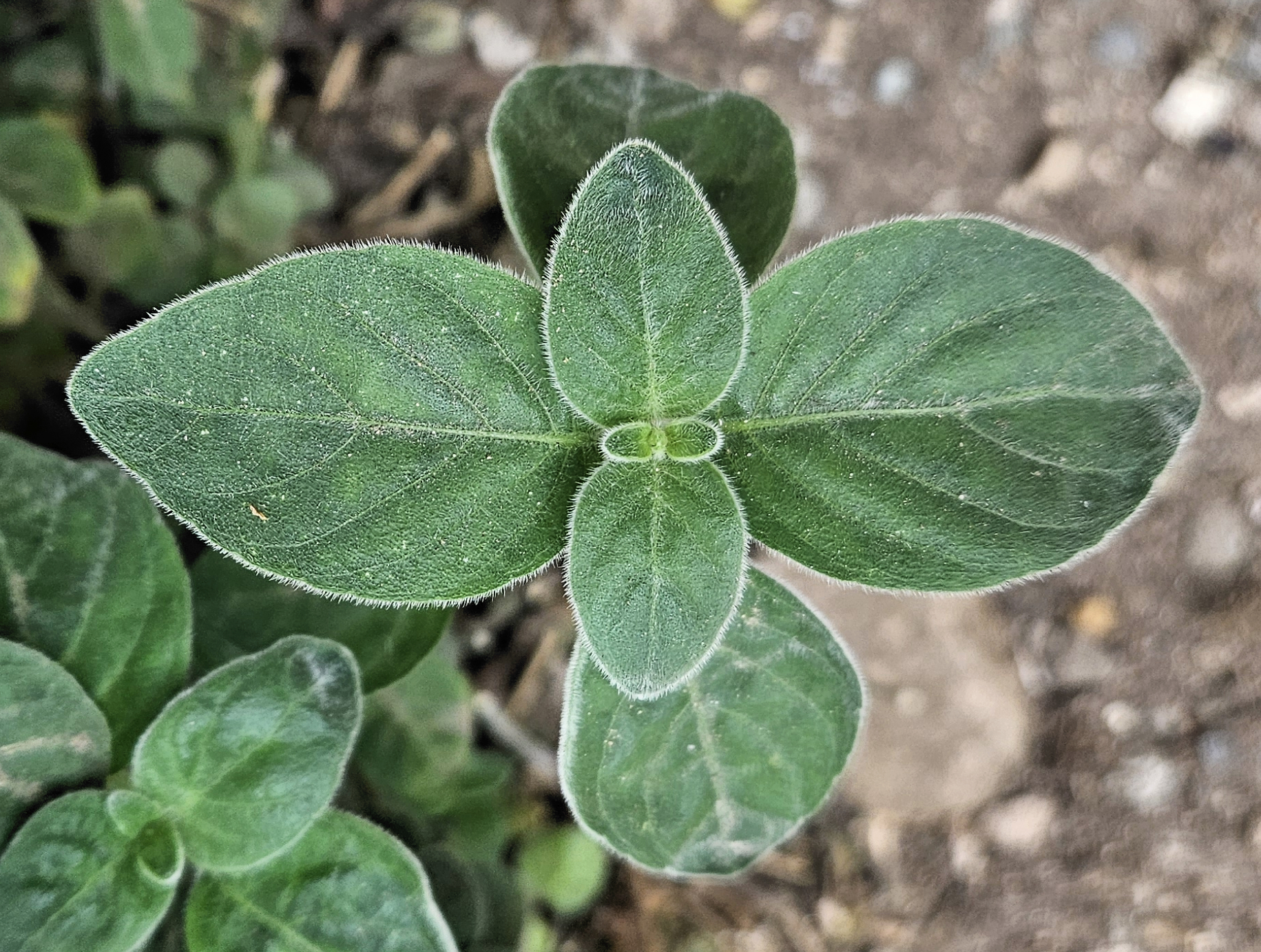
Leaf close up

It is native to Peru, Bolivia, Paraguay, northern Argentina, Uruguay, and southern, southeastern, and west-central Brazil, including the Cerrado ecoregion of Brazil. It grows primarily in the seasonally dry tropical biome. In Costa Rica, it flowers during the dry season (summer) at altitudes of 1630 m above sea level.

== Cultivation ==
The Hummingbird plant is a tender, herbaceous perennial that can easily grow in well-drained soils such as loam and silt under full sun. Tolerating mild shade and drought, it is winter hardy to Zones 8-10 in the US, which can be protected with mulch cover. It can tolerate temperatures down to −17.7 °C (0 °F) and may also be grown as an annual. It may be grown in containers or hanging baskets. Cuttings can be taken and overwintered indoors.
