= Dicliptera mucronifolia =

Scientific classification
- Kingdom: Plantae
- Clade: Tracheophytes
- Clade: Angiosperms
- Clade: Eudicots
- Clade: Asterids
- Order: Lamiales
- Family: Acanthaceae
- Genus: Dicliptera
- Species: D. mucronifolia

Binomial name
- Dicliptera mucronifolia Nees (1847)

Synonyms
- Diapedium mucronifolium (Nees) Kuntze (1891); Justicia brachiata Salzm. ex Nees (1847), not validly publ.

Species of flowering plant

Dicliptera mucronifolia is a species of flowering plant in the acanthus family, Acanthaceae. it is a subshrub native to eastern, southern, and west-central Brazil, where it grows in the Cerrado ecoregion. This plant is cited in Flora Brasiliensis by Carl Friedrich Philipp von Martius.
