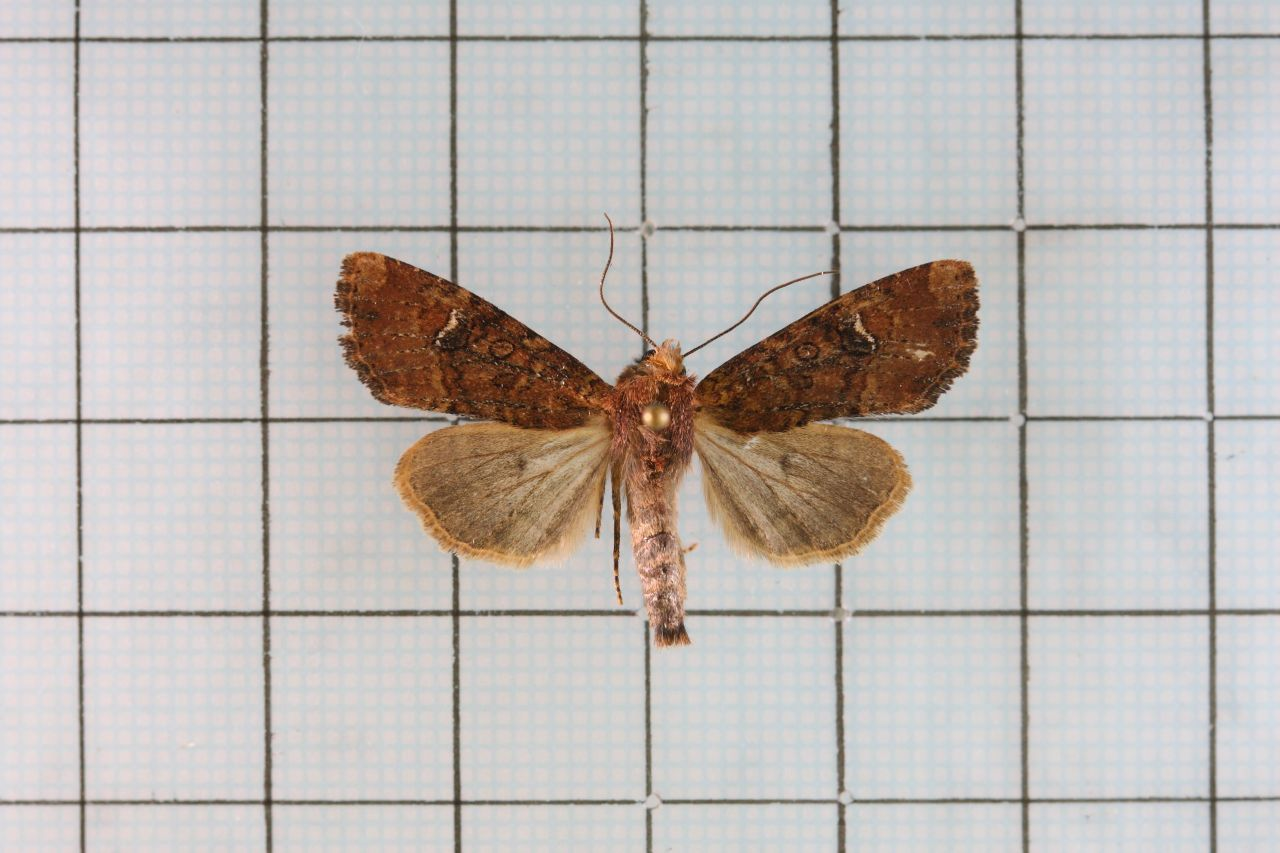

Scientific classification
- Domain: Eukaryota
- Kingdom: Animalia
- Phylum: Arthropoda
- Class: Insecta
- Order: Lepidoptera
- Superfamily: Noctuoidea
- Family: Noctuidae
- Genus: Feliniopsis
- Species: F. tripunctata

Binomial name
- Feliniopsis tripunctata (Chang, 1991)

= Feliniopsis tripunctata =

Species of moth

Feliniopsis tripunctata is a moth in the family Noctuidae. It is found in Taiwan.

The wingspan is 33 mm.
