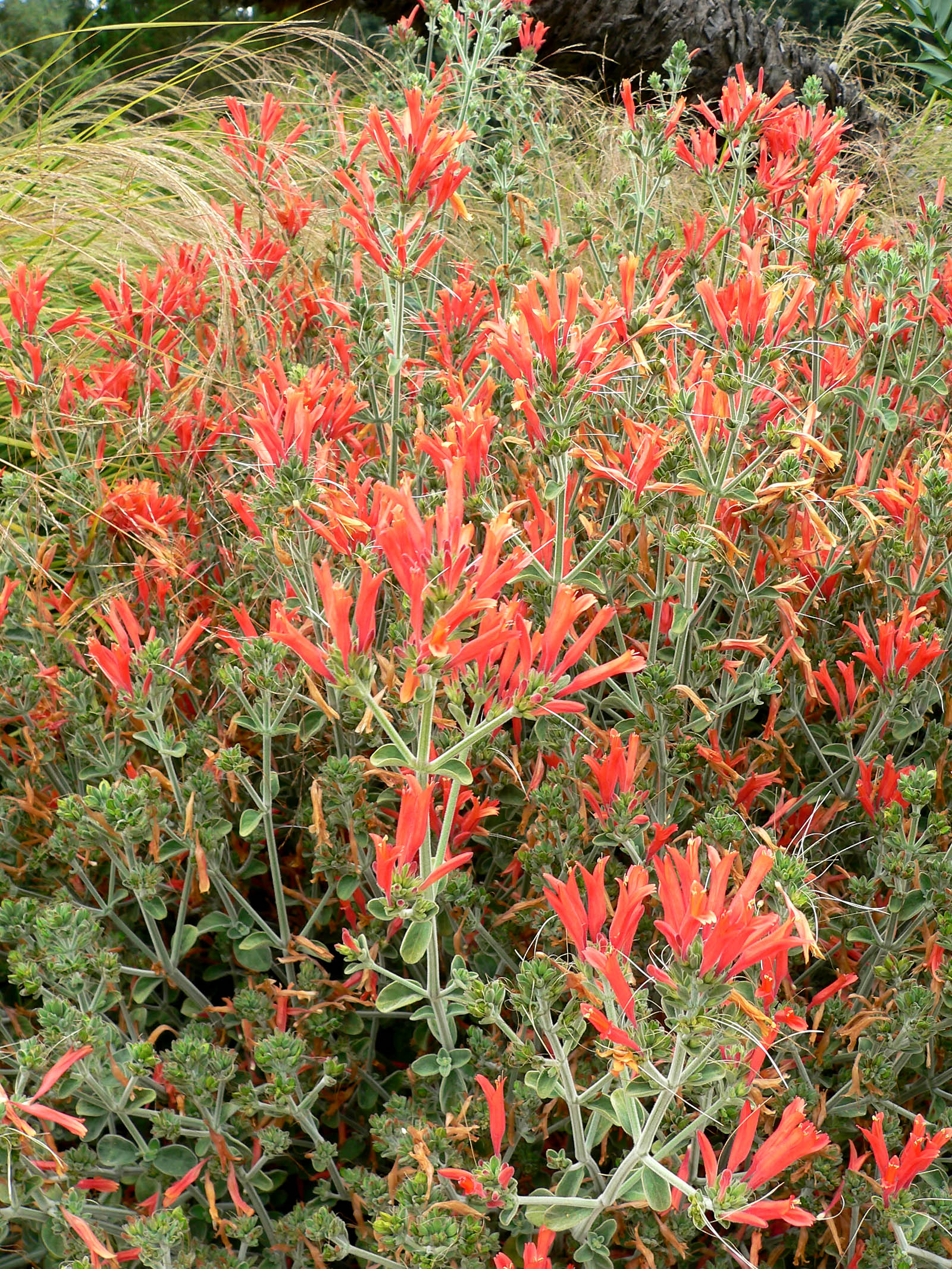
- Uruguayan firecracker plant (Dicliptera squarrosa)

Scientific classification
- Kingdom: Plantae
- Clade: Tracheophytes
- Clade: Angiosperms
- Clade: Eudicots
- Clade: Asterids
- Order: Lamiales
- Family: Acanthaceae
- Subfamily: Acanthoideae
- Tribe: Justicieae
- Genus: Dicliptera; Juss. (1807), nom. cons.

Species
- See text

Synonyms
- Brochosiphon Nees (1847); Dactylostegium Nees (1847); Diapedium J.Koenig (1805), nom. rej.; Kuniria Raf. (1838); Panemata Raf. (1838); Peristrophe Nees (1832); Ramusia Nees (1847); Solenochasma Fenzl (1844); Strepsiphus Raf. (1837)

= Dicliptera =

Genus of flowering plants

Dicliptera is a genus of flowering plants in the bear's breeches family, Acanthaceae. It includes 223 species native to the tropics and subtropics worldwide. Well-known synonyms include Peristrophe and Dactylostegium.

== Host plant ==
Dicliptera functions as a host plant for the butterfly, Anartia fatima.

== Species ==
As of March 2021, Plants of the World Online included the following species.

- Dicliptera abuensis Blatt.
- Dicliptera aculeata C.B.Clarke
- Dicliptera acuminata (Ruiz & Pav.) Juss.
- Dicliptera adusta Lindau
- Dicliptera albicaulis (S.Moore) S.Moore
- Dicliptera albocostata Bremek.
- Dicliptera alternans Lindau
- Dicliptera angolensis S.Moore
- Dicliptera anomala Leonard
- Dicliptera antidysenterica Ant.Molina
- Dicliptera aquatica Leonard
- Dicliptera aripoensis (Britton) Leonard
- Dicliptera armata F.Muell.
- Dicliptera arnhemica R.M.Barker
- Dicliptera australis (Nees) R.M.Barker
- Dicliptera bagshawei S.Moore
- Dicliptera baphica Nees
- Dicliptera batilliformis Leonard
- Dicliptera beddomei C.B.Clarke
- Dicliptera betonicoides S.Moore
- Dicliptera brachiata Spreng.
- Dicliptera bracteata Seem.
- Dicliptera brevispicata I.Darbysh.
- Dicliptera bupleuroides Nees
- Dicliptera burmanni Nees
- Dicliptera cabrerae C.Ezcurra
- Dicliptera callichlamys Mildbr.
- Dicliptera canescens Nees
- Dicliptera capensis Nees
- Dicliptera capitata Milne-Redh.
- Dicliptera caracasana Nees
- Dicliptera carvalhoi Lindau
- Dicliptera caucensis Leonard
- Dicliptera cernua (Nees) J.C.Manning & Goldblatt
- Dicliptera chinensis (L.) Juss.
  – type species
- Dicliptera cicatricosa I.Darbysh.
- Dicliptera ciliaris Juss.
- Dicliptera ciliata Decne.
- Dicliptera clarkei Elmer
- Dicliptera clavata (G.Forst.) Juss.
- Dicliptera cleistogama J.R.I.Wood
- Dicliptera cliffordii (K.Balkwill) J.C.Manning & Goldblatt
- Dicliptera clinopodia Nees
- Dicliptera cochabambensis Lindau
- Dicliptera colorata C.B.Clarke
- Dicliptera compacta Leonard
- Dicliptera confinis Nees ex Benth.
- Dicliptera congesta Kunth
- Dicliptera contorta (Blanco) Merr.
- Dicliptera cordibracteata I.Darbysh.
- Dicliptera crenata Miq.
- Dicliptera cuatrecasasii Leonard
- Dicliptera cubangensis S.Moore
- Dicliptera cundinamarcana Wassh.
- Dicliptera cuneata Nees
- Dicliptera debilis Leonard
- Dicliptera decaryi Benoist
- Dicliptera decorticans (K.Balkwill) I.Darbysh.
- Dicliptera dodsonii Wassh. (possibly extinct)
- Dicliptera dorrii Wassh.
- Dicliptera eenii S.Moore
- Dicliptera effusa Balf.f.
- Dicliptera ehrenbergii Lindau
- Dicliptera elegans W.W.Sm.
- Dicliptera elliotii C.B.Clarke
- Dicliptera eriantha Decne.
- Dicliptera extenta S.Moore
- Dicliptera falcata (Lam.) Bosser & Heine
- Dicliptera falciflora Lindau
- Dicliptera felix J.R.I.Wood
- Dicliptera fera (C.B.Clarke) Karthik. & Moorthy
- Dicliptera fionae K.Balkwill
- Dicliptera floribunda Eastw.
- Dicliptera foetida (Forssk.) Blatt.
- Dicliptera formosa Brandegee
- Dicliptera forsteriana Nees
- Dicliptera fragilis Bremek.
- Dicliptera francodavilae Cornejo, Wassh. & Bonifaz
- Dicliptera frondosa Juss.
- Dicliptera fruticosa K.Balkwill
- Dicliptera garciae Leonard
- Dicliptera gillilandiorum (K.Balkwill) I.Darbysh.
- Dicliptera glabra Decne.
- Dicliptera gracilis Leonard
- Dicliptera grandibracteata (Lindau) J.C.Manning & Goldblatt
- Dicliptera grandiflora Gilli
- Dicliptera granvillei Wassh.
- Dicliptera guttata Standl. & Leonard
- Dicliptera haenkeana Nees
- Dicliptera harlingii Wassh.
- Dicliptera hastilis Benoist
- Dicliptera haughtii Leonard
- Dicliptera hensii Lindau
- Dicliptera hereroensis Schinz
- Dicliptera heterostegia C.Presl
- Dicliptera hookeriana Nees
- Dicliptera hyalina Nees
- Dicliptera imbricata Leonard
- Dicliptera imminuta Rizzini
- Dicliptera inaequalis Greenm.
- Dicliptera inconspicua I.Darbysh.
- Dicliptera induta W.W.Sm.
- Dicliptera insularis Benoist
- Dicliptera interrupta Blume
- Dicliptera inutilis Leonard
- Dicliptera iopus Lindau
- Dicliptera japonica (Thunb.) Makino
- Dicliptera javanica Nees
- Dicliptera jujuyensis Lindau ex R.E.Fr.
- Dicliptera katangensis De Wild.
- Dicliptera knappiae Wassh.
- Dicliptera krugii Urb.
- Dicliptera kurzii C.B.Clarke
- Dicliptera lanceolaria (Roxb.) Karthik. & Moorthy
- Dicliptera lanceolata (Lindau) I.Darbysh. & Kordofani
- Dicliptera latibracteata I.Darbysh.
- Dicliptera laxata C.B.Clarke
- Dicliptera laxispica Lindau
- Dicliptera leandrii Benoist
- Dicliptera leistneri K.Balkwill
- Dicliptera leonotis Dalzell ex C.B.Clarke
- Dicliptera longiflora Hayata
- Dicliptera longifolia (King & Prain) Karthik. & Moorthy
- Dicliptera lugoi Wassh.
- Dicliptera maclearii Hemsl.
- Dicliptera maculata Nees
- Dicliptera madagascariensis Nees
- Dicliptera magaliesbergensis K.Balkwill
- Dicliptera magnibracteata Collett & Hemsl.
- Dicliptera martinicensis (Jacq.) Juss.
- Dicliptera megalochlamys Leonard
- Dicliptera melleri Rolfe
- Dicliptera membranacea Leonard
- Dicliptera minbuensis Bor
- Dicliptera minor C.B.Clarke
- Dicliptera minutifolia Ensermu
- Dicliptera miscella R.M.Barker
- Dicliptera monroi S.Moore
- Dicliptera montana Lindau
- Dicliptera moritziana S.Schauer
- Dicliptera mucronata Urb.
- Dicliptera mucronifolia Nees
- Dicliptera muelleriferdinandi Lindau
- Dicliptera multiflora (Ruiz & Pav.) Juss.
- Dicliptera namibiensis (K.Balkwill) J.C.Manning & Goldblatt
- Dicliptera napierae E.A.Bruce
- Dicliptera nasikensis Lakshmin. & B.D.Sharma
- Dicliptera neesii (Trimen) L.H.Cramer
- Dicliptera nervata Greenm.
- Dicliptera nilotica C.B.Clarke
- Dicliptera novogaliciana T.F.Daniel
- Dicliptera nyangana I.Darbysh.
- Dicliptera obanensis S.Moore
- Dicliptera obtusifolia Urb.
- Dicliptera ochrochlamys Leonard
- Dicliptera pallida Leonard
- Dicliptera palmariensis Wassh. & J.R.I.Wood
- Dicliptera paniculata (Forssk.) I.Darbysh.
- Dicliptera paposana Phil.
- Dicliptera papuana Warb.
- Dicliptera parvibracteata Nees
- Dicliptera peduncularis Nees
- Dicliptera peruviana (Lam.) Juss.
- Dicliptera pilosa Kunth
- Dicliptera podocephala Donn.Sm.
- Dicliptera polymorpha Dharap, Shigwan, Datar
- Dicliptera porphyrea Lindau
- Dicliptera porphyrocoma Leonard
- Dicliptera procumbens Humb. ex Link
- Dicliptera pubescens Juss.
- Dicliptera pumila (Lindau) Dandy ex Brenan
- Dicliptera purpurascens Wassh. & J.R.I.Wood
- Dicliptera pyrrantha Leonard
- Dicliptera quintasii Lindau
- Dicliptera quitensis Mildbr.
- Dicliptera rauhii Wassh.
- Dicliptera raui Karthik. & Moorthy
- Dicliptera reptans Nees
- Dicliptera resupinata (Vahl) Juss. – Arizona foldwing
- Dicliptera rigidissima Miranda
- Dicliptera riparia Nees
- Dicliptera rosea Ridl.
- Dicliptera samoensis Seem.
- Dicliptera sanctae-martae Leonard
- Dicliptera saxicola J.R.I.Wood
- Dicliptera scabra Nees
- Dicliptera scandens Leonard
- Dicliptera sciadephora Donn.Sm.
- Dicliptera scutellata Griseb.
- Dicliptera sebastinei Karthik. & Moorthy
- Dicliptera serpenticola (K.Balkwill & Campb.-Young) I.Darbysh.
- Dicliptera sexangularis (L.) Juss. – Sixangle foldwing
- Dicliptera siamensis Imlay
- Dicliptera sparsiflora Nees
- Dicliptera spicata Decne.
- Dicliptera squarrosa Nees
  - synonym D. suberecta (André) Bremek. – Uruguayan firecracker plant, hummingbird plant
- Dicliptera suffruticosa J.R.I.Wood
- Dicliptera sumichrastii Lindau
- Dicliptera swynnertonii S.Moore
- Dicliptera syringifolia Merxm.
- Dicliptera thlaspioides Nees
- Dicliptera tinctoria (Nees) Kostel.
- Dicliptera tomentosa (Vahl) Nees
- Dicliptera transvaalensis C.B.Clarke
- Dicliptera trianae Leonard
- Dicliptera trifurca Oerst.
- Dicliptera undulata (Vahl) Karthik. & Moorthy
- Dicliptera unguiculata Nees
- Dicliptera velata Seem.
- Dicliptera verticillata (Forssk.) C.Chr.
- Dicliptera vestita Benoist
- Dicliptera villosior Berhaut
- Dicliptera viridis Hassk.
- Dicliptera vollesenii I.Darbysh.
- Dicliptera vulcanica Leonard
- Dicliptera welwitschii S.Moore
- Dicliptera zambeziensis I.Darbysh.

Dicliptera srisailamica Rasingam, Nethaji & Susmitha was described in 2024, but was not in POWO as of November 2024.
