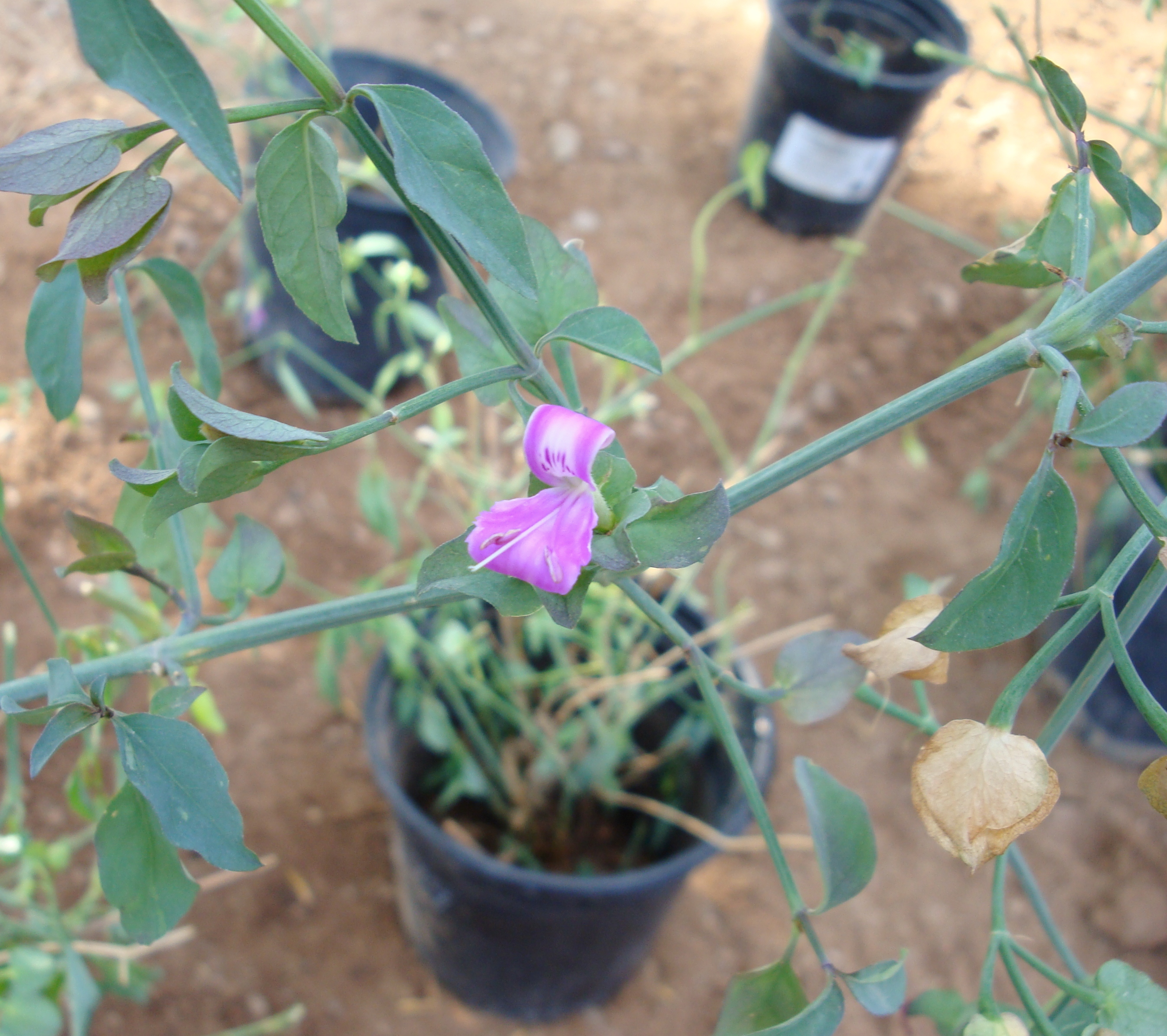

Scientific classification
- Kingdom: Plantae
- Clade: Tracheophytes
- Clade: Angiosperms
- Clade: Eudicots
- Clade: Asterids
- Order: Lamiales
- Family: Acanthaceae
- Genus: Dicliptera
- Species: D. resupinata

Binomial name
- Dicliptera resupinata (Vahl) Juss.

= Dicliptera resupinata =

Species of flowering plant

Dicliptera resupinata, the Arizona foldwing, is a perennial plant in the Acanthaceae family. It is native to higher areas of southeastern Arizona into Mexico. It is a host to the Texan crescentspot (Anthanassa texana).

== Characteristics ==
Growth Habit: Herb/forb. Height: To 2 feet (61 cm) tall. Flowering Season: Spring, Summer, and early Fall.

== Inflorescence and fruit ==
The inflorescence is a pinkish violet flower surrounded by pairs of large, heart-shaped, green bracts, usually occurring in groups of 3.
