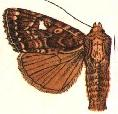

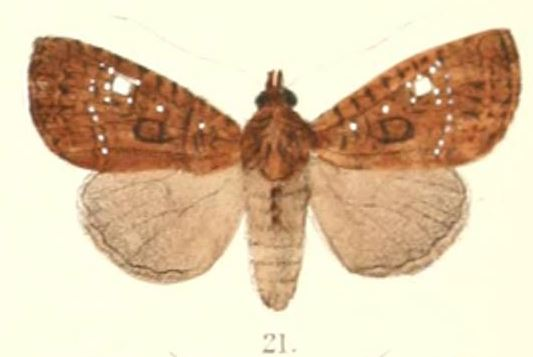

Scientific classification
- Kingdom: Animalia
- Phylum: Arthropoda
- Clade: Pancrustacea
- Class: Insecta
- Order: Lepidoptera
- Superfamily: Noctuoidea
- Family: Noctuidae
- Genus: Feliniopsis
- Species: F. leucostigma

Binomial name
- Feliniopsis leucostigma (Moore, 1867)

Synonyms
- Xylophasia leucostigma Moore, 1867; Hadena constellata Moore, 1882; Euplexia oxydata Hampson, 1902; Eutamsia leucostigma (Moore, 1867); Parastichtis leucostigma (Moore, 1867)

= Feliniopsis leucostigma =

Species of moth

Feliniopsis leucostigma is a moth of the family Noctuidae. It is found in Sikkim and Darjeeling and has recently been recorded from China.
