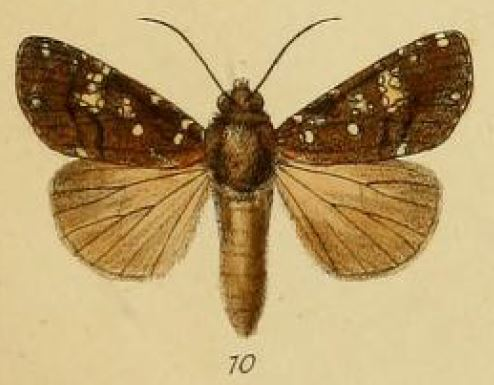

Scientific classification
- Domain: Eukaryota
- Kingdom: Animalia
- Phylum: Arthropoda
- Class: Insecta
- Order: Lepidoptera
- Superfamily: Noctuoidea
- Family: Noctuidae
- Genus: Feliniopsis
- Species: F. africana

Binomial name
- Feliniopsis africana (Schaus & Clements, 1893)

Synonyms
- Perigea africana Schaus & Clements, 1893; Trachea leucura Hampson, 1914; Trachea phoenicolopha Hampson, 1914

= Feliniopsis africana =

Species of moth

Feliniopsis africana is a moth of the family Noctuidae described by William Schaus and W. G. Clements in 1893.

== Distribution ==
It is found in most countries of subtropical Africa, from Guinea and Ethiopia to South Africa.
