= Feliniopsis opposita =

Scientific classification
- Kingdom: Animalia
- Phylum: Arthropoda
- Class: Insecta
- Order: Lepidoptera
- Superfamily: Noctuoidea
- Family: Noctuidae
- Genus: Feliniopsis
- Species: F. opposita

Binomial name
- Feliniopsis opposita (Walker, 1865)

Synonyms
- Mamestra opposita Walker, 1865

Species of moth

Feliniopsis opposita is a moth of the family Noctuidae first described by Francis Walker in 1865. It is found in Kenya, Somalia, Sri Lanka and India.
