= Dicliptera samoensis =

Scientific classification
- Kingdom: Plantae
- Clade: Tracheophytes
- Clade: Angiosperms
- Clade: Eudicots
- Clade: Asterids
- Order: Lamiales
- Family: Acanthaceae
- Genus: Dicliptera
- Species: D. samoensis

Binomial name
- Dicliptera samoensis Seem.

Species of flowering plant

Dicliptera samoensis is a species of flowering plant in the family Acanthaceae. It is endemic to Samoa.

== See also ==
- Samoan tropical moist forests
