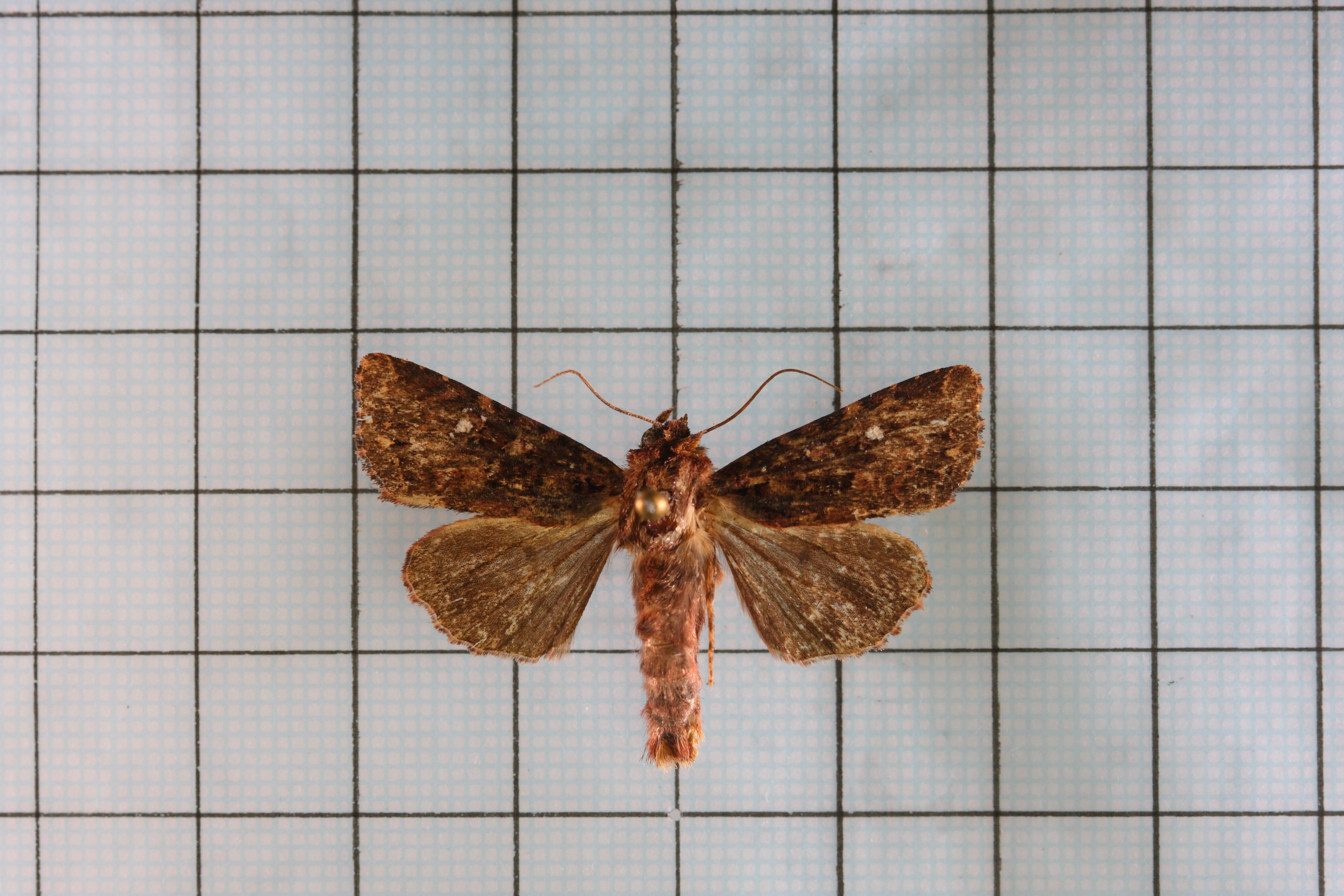
- Feliniopsis tripunctata

Scientific classification
- Domain: Eukaryota
- Kingdom: Animalia
- Phylum: Arthropoda
- Class: Insecta
- Order: Lepidoptera
- Superfamily: Noctuoidea
- Family: Noctuidae
- Subfamily: Noctuinae
- Tribe: Dypterygiini
- Genus: Feliniopsis; Roepke, 1938

= Feliniopsis =

Genus of moths

Feliniopsis is a genus of moths of the family Noctuidae.

== Species ==
- Feliniopsis africana Schaus, 1893
- Feliniopsis albilineata (Warren, 1912)
- Feliniopsis albiorbis (Warren, 1912)
- Feliniopsis annosa Viette, 1963
  - Feliniopsis annosa annosa Viette, 1963
  - Feliniopsis annosa anuosoides Hacker & Fibiger, 2007
- Feliniopsis asahinai (Sugi, 1982)
- Feliniopsis baueri Hacker & Fibiger, 2007
- Feliniopsis berioi Viette, 1963
- Feliniopsis breviuscula (Walker, 1858)
- Feliniopsis confundens (Walker, 1857)
- Feliniopsis confusa Laporte, 1973
- Feliniopsis connivens Felder & Rogenhofer, 1874
  - Feliniopsis connivens connivens Felder & Rogenhofer, 1874
  - Feliniopsis connivens felix Hacker & Fibiger, 2007
- Feliniopsis connotata (Warren, 1912)
- Feliniopsis consummata Walker, 1857
  - Feliniopsis consummata consummata Walker, 1857
  - Feliniopsis consummata tulipifera Saalmüller, 1891
- Feliniopsis dargei (Laporte, 1973)
- Feliniopsis dinavana (Hampson, 1908)
- Feliniopsis discisignata (Wileman & South, 1920)
- Feliniopsis distans (Moore, 1882)
- Feliniopsis duponti Laporte, 1974
  - Feliniopsis duponti dargei Laporte, 1973
  - Feliniopsis duponti duponti Laporte, 1974
- Feliniopsis germaine (Laporte, 1975)
- Feliniopsis grisea Laporte, 1973
- Feliniopsis gueneei Laporte, 1973
- Feliniopsis hoplista Viette, 1963
- Feliniopsis hosplitoides Laporte, 1979
  - Feliniopsis hosplitoides aarviki Hacker & Fibiger, 2007
  - Feliniopsis hosplitoides hosplitoides Laporte, 1979
- Feliniopsis hyperythra Galsworthy, 1997
- Feliniopsis hyposcota (Hampson, 1911)
- Feliniopsis incerta Roepke, 1938
- Feliniopsis indigna Herrich-Schäffer, 1854
- Feliniopsis indistans Guenée, 1852
- Feliniopsis inextricans (Walker, 1858)
- Feliniopsis insolita Hacker & Fibiger, 2007
- Feliniopsis ivoriensis Laporte, 1973
- Feliniopsis karischi Hacker & Fibiger, 2007
- Feliniopsis kipengerensis Hacker & Fibiger, 2007
- Feliniopsis kobesi Hacker & Fibiger, 2007
- Feliniopsis knudlarseni Hacker & Fibiger, 2007
- Feliniopsis kuehnei Hacker & Fibiger, 2007
- Feliniopsis laportei Hacker & Fibiger, 2007
  - Feliniopsis laportei dallastai Hacker & Fibiger, 2007
  - Feliniopsis laportei laportei Hacker & Fibiger, 2007
- Feliniopsis legraini Hacker & Fibiger, 2007
- Feliniopsis leucostigma (Moore, 1867)
- Feliniopsis ligniensis Laporte, 1973
- Feliniopsis lucipara (Wileman & West, 1929)
- Feliniopsis macrostigma (Snellen, 1880)
- Feliniopsis medleri Laporte, 1973
- Feliniopsis milloti Viette, 1961
- Feliniopsis minnecii Berio, 1939
- Feliniopsis nabalua (Holloway, 1976)
- Feliniopsis nigribarbata Hampson, 1908
- Feliniopsis niveipuncta (Hampson, 1911)
- Feliniopsis opposita (Walker, 1865)
- Feliniopsis parvula Hacker & Fibiger, 2007
- Feliniopsis peridela (Wileman & West, 1929)
- Feliniopsis politzari Hacker & Fibiger, 2007
- Feliniopsis quadrispina (Holloway, 1979)
- Feliniopsis rufigiji Hacker & Fibiger, 2007
- Feliniopsis sabaea Hacker & Fibiger, 2001
- Feliniopsis satellitis Berio, 1974
- Feliniopsis securifera (Wileman & West, 1929)
- Feliniopsis segreta Berio, 1966
- Feliniopsis septentrionalis (Rougeot & Laporte, 1983)
- Feliniopsis siderifera (Moore, 1881)
- Feliniopsis somaliensis (Laporte, 1974)
- Feliniopsis subsagula D. S. Fletcher, 1961
- Feliniopsis talhouki Wiltshire, 1983
- Feliniopsis tamsi (Berio, 1974)
- Feliniopsis tenera Viette, 1963
- Feliniopsis theryi (Laporte, 1975)
- Feliniopsis thoracica (Walker, 1858)
- Feliniopsis tripunctata (Chang, 1991)
- Feliniopsis tulipifera (Saalmüller, 1891)
- Feliniopsis viettei Hacker & Fibiger, 2001
- Feliniopsis wojtusiaki Hacker & Fibiger, 2007
