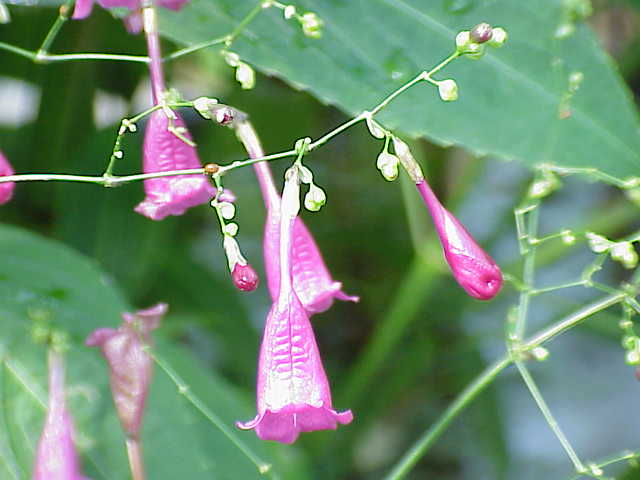

Scientific classification
- Kingdom: Plantae
- Clade: Tracheophytes
- Clade: Angiosperms
- Clade: Eudicots
- Clade: Asterids
- Order: Lamiales
- Family: Acanthaceae
- Subfamily: Acanthoideae
- Tribe: Justicieae
- Genus: Dicliptera
- Species: D. raui

Binomial name
- Dicliptera raui Karthik. & Moorthy (2009)

Synonyms
- Ecbolium speciosum (Roxb.) Kuntze; Justicia riviniifolia Vis.; Justicia speciosa Roxb.; Peristrophe speciosa (Roxb.) Nees; Strepsiphus speciosus (Roxb.) Raf.

= Dicliptera raui =

Species of flowering plant

Dicliptera raui (a.k.a. Peristrophe speciosa) is a flowering plant in the family Acanthaceae.

== Description ==
This species is a broad-leafed shrub with greyish stems and elliptic leaves that are approximately 8 cm. It has purple-pink flowers.

== Distribution ==
It is a native of Northern India to Bangladesh and occurs in the foothills of the central & eastern Himalayas up 1,600 metres elevation.
