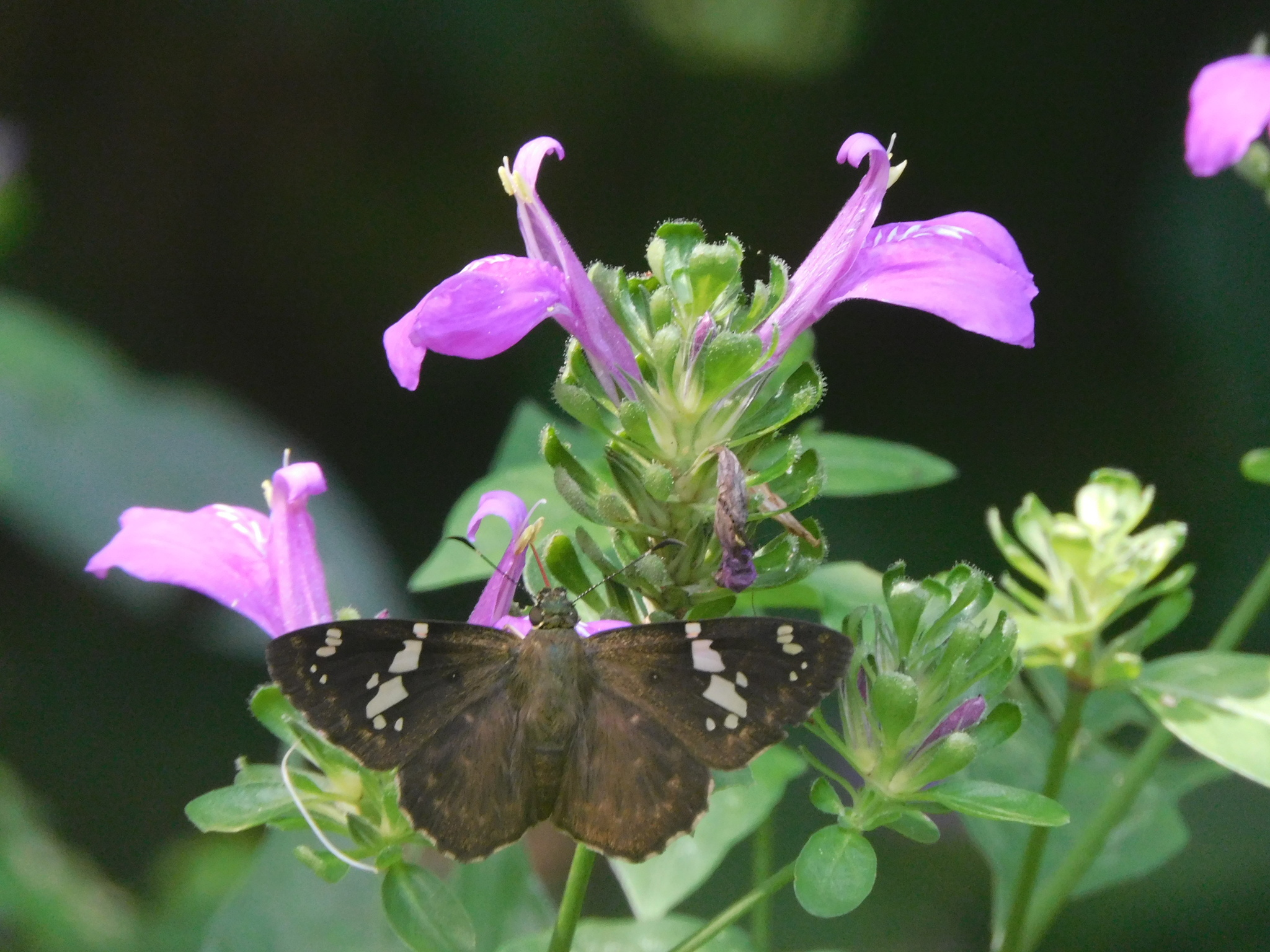
- Magdalena Department, Colombia, 2022

Scientific classification
- Kingdom: Plantae
- Clade: Tracheophytes
- Clade: Angiosperms
- Clade: Eudicots
- Clade: Asterids
- Order: Lamiales
- Family: Acanthaceae
- Genus: Dicliptera
- Species: D. brachiata

Binomial name
- Dicliptera brachiata Spreng.

= Dicliptera brachiata =

Plant species

Dicliptera brachiata (false mint, wild mudwort, branched foldwing) is a species of plant in the family Acanthaceae. It is an herbaceous perennial native to North America, ranging from the eastern United States to Central America.

== Description ==
Dicliptera brachiata grows 0.3–1.0 m tall and has simple ovate leaves. The leaves are smooth, glabrous, and pinnately veined with entire margins.

== Taxonomy ==
Dicliptera brachiata contains the following varieties:

- Dicliptera brachiata var. glandulosa
- Dicliptera brachiata var. attenuata
- Dicliptera brachiata var. ruthii
