= Dicliptera polymorpha =

Scientific classification
- Kingdom: Plantae
- Clade: Tracheophytes
- Clade: Angiosperms
- Clade: Eudicots
- Clade: Asterids
- Order: Lamiales
- Family: Acanthaceae
- Genus: Dicliptera
- Species: D. polymorpha

Binomial name
- Dicliptera polymorpha Dharap, Shigwan & Datar

Species of plant

Dicliptera polymorpha is a species of plant belonging to the genus Dicliptera. It is found in the Western ghats of Maharashtra in India. This flower blooms twice in a year and the plant is fire tolerant or pyrophytic.
