= Dicliptera ciliata =

Conservation status
- Least Concern (NCA)

Scientific classification
- Kingdom: Plantae
- Clade: Tracheophytes
- Clade: Angiosperms
- Clade: Eudicots
- Clade: Asterids
- Order: Lamiales
- Family: Acanthaceae
- Genus: Dicliptera
- Species: D. ciliata

Binomial name
- Dicliptera ciliata Decne.

Species of flowering plant

Dicliptera ciliata is a species of plant in the family Acanthaceae. It is native to Malesia and the Australian states of Western Australia, the Northern Territory and Queensland. It is a herb up to 50 cm (20 in) high, and was first described in 1834.

== Conservation ==
This species is listed as least concern under the Queensland Government's Nature Conservation Act.
