= Dicliptera beddomei =

Scientific classification
- Kingdom: Plantae
- Clade: Tracheophytes
- Clade: Angiosperms
- Clade: Eudicots
- Clade: Asterids
- Order: Lamiales
- Family: Acanthaceae
- Genus: Dicliptera
- Species: D. beddomei

Binomial name
- Dicliptera beddomei C.B.Clarke

Species of flowering plant

Dicliptera beddomei is a species of flowering plant in the genus of Dicliptera. It was listed in IUCN's 1997 Red list of threatened plant species. It has been described as having ciliate bracts and pubescent leaves.
