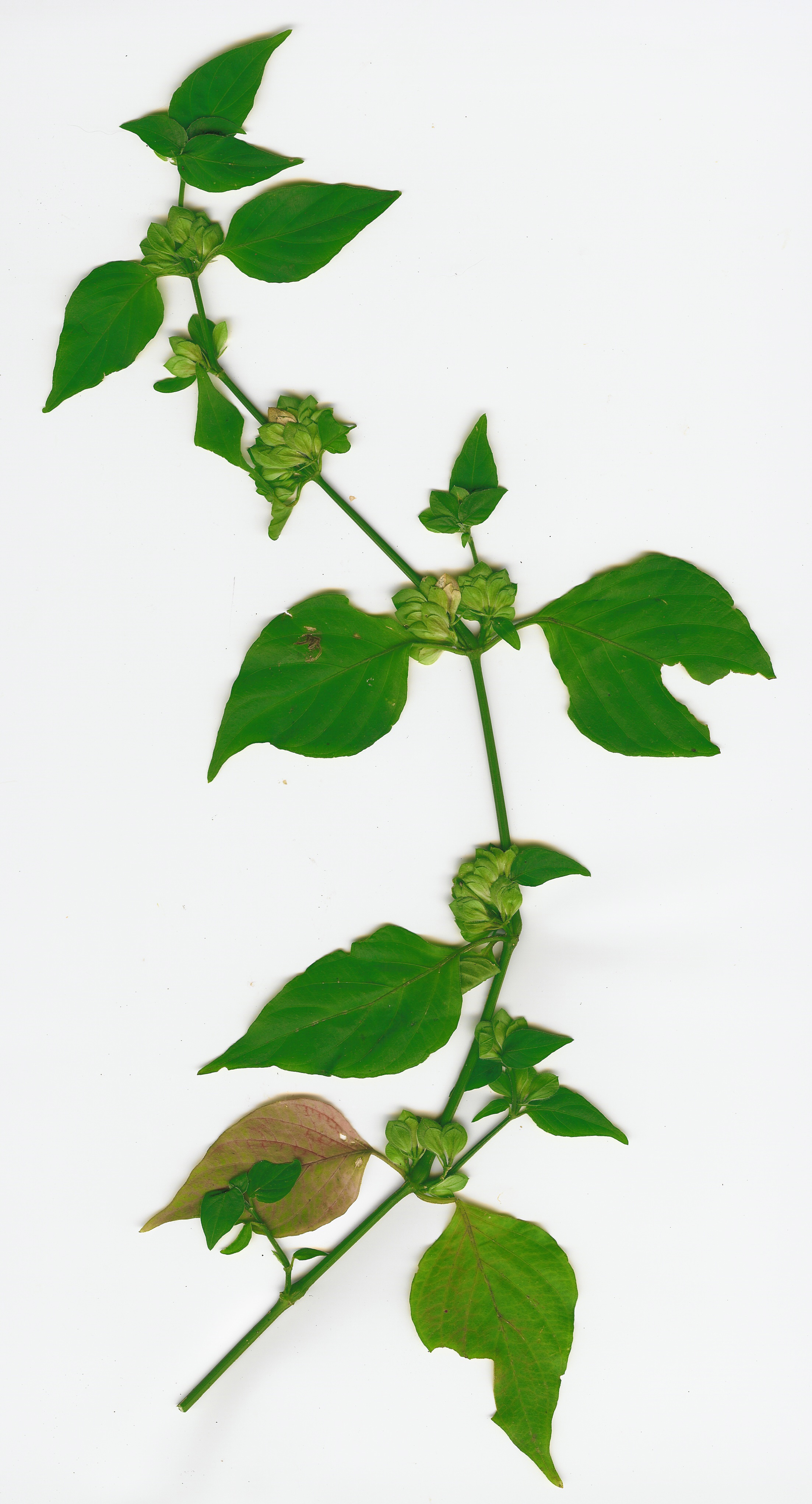

Scientific classification
- Kingdom: Plantae
- Clade: Embryophytes
- Clade: Tracheophytes
- Clade: Angiosperms
- Clade: Eudicots
- Clade: Asterids
- Order: Lamiales
- Family: Acanthaceae
- Genus: Dicliptera
- Species: D. chinensis

Binomial name
- Dicliptera chinensis (L.) Juss.

Synonyms
- Diapedium chinense (L.) K.D.Koenig; Justicia chinensis L.

= Dicliptera chinensis =

Species of flowering plant

Dicliptera chinensis, commonly known as Chinese foldwing, is a species of subshrub of the plant family Acanthaceae. It occurs in mainland China, Hong Kong, Taiwan, Japan, and South and Southeast Asia.

== Description ==
This species is an annual or biennial herb growing 30–80 cm (12–31 in) tall, with quadrangular, mostly smooth stems that are slightly hairy on young parts. The leaves are ovate-elliptic (2–8 cm long) with entire or slightly wavy margins, smooth above and lightly hairy along the veins beneath. The inflorescences are axillary or terminal, forming small cymes or short panicles (1–4 cm). The flowers have a pale purple, bilabiate corolla about 1–1.2 cm long with two protruding stamens. The fruit is a small, broadly ellipsoidal capsule (about 6 mm) containing four round, textured seeds.

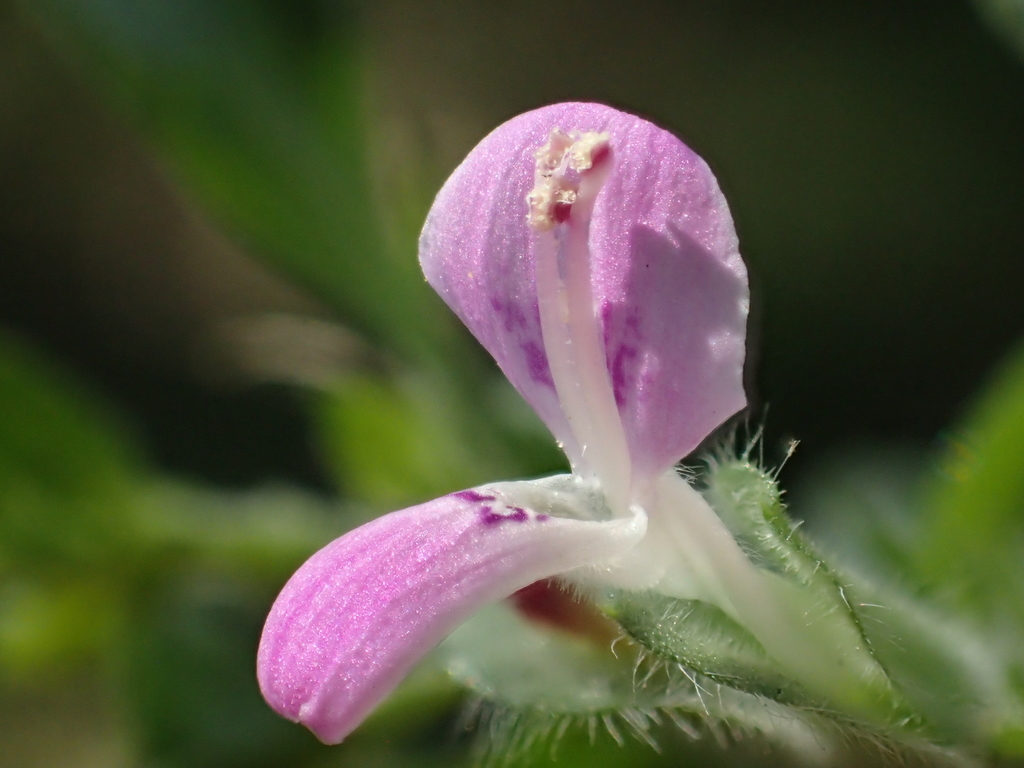

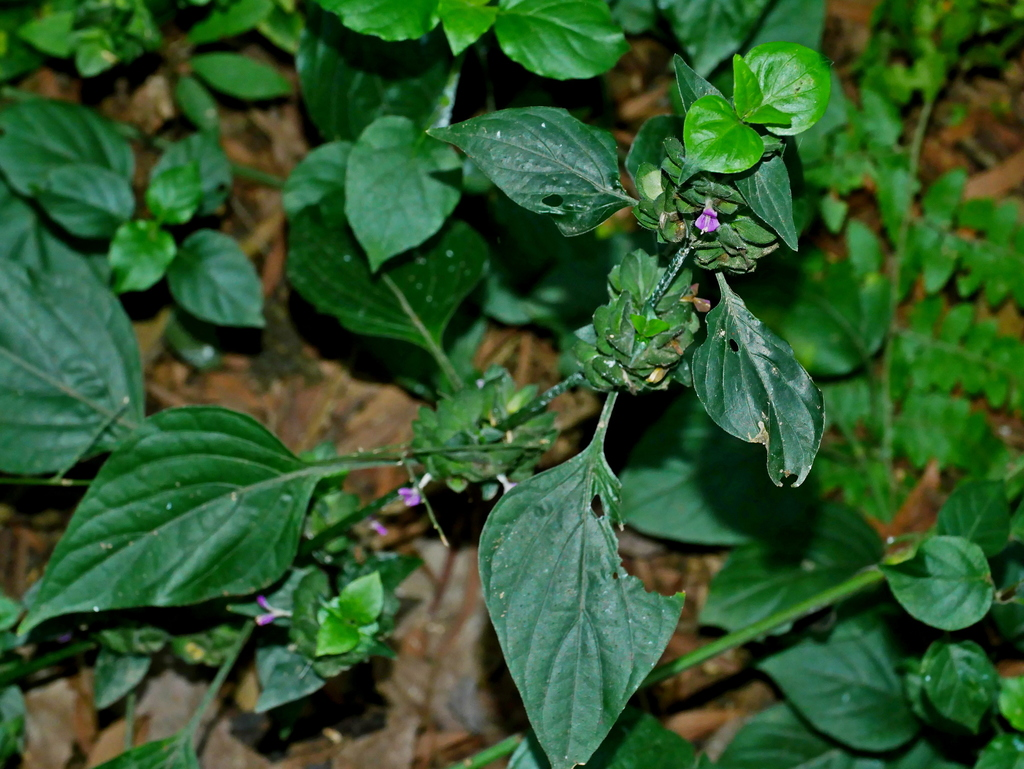

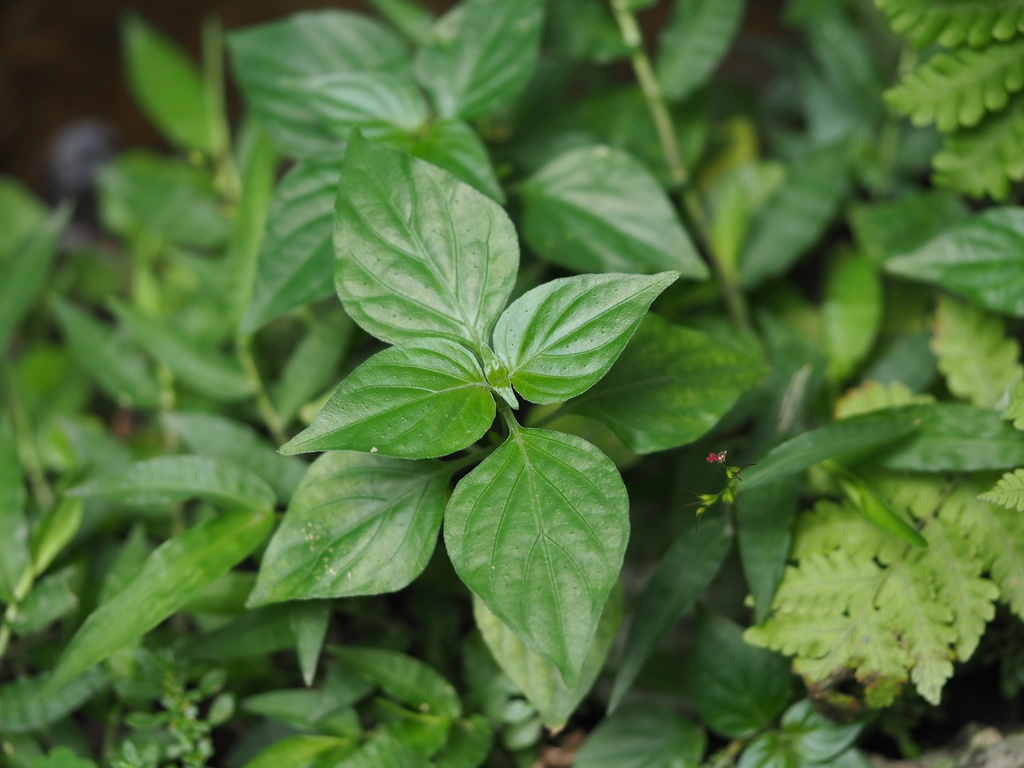

=== Life cycle ===
The species flowers from July to December.

== Distribution and habitats ==
It occurs in mainland China (Hainan, Guangdong, Guangxi, Guizhou, Yunnan, Sichuan, and Fujian), Hong Kong, Taiwan, Japan, and South and Southeast Asia, including Afghanistan, Assam, Bangladesh, Pakistan, India, Nepal, Myanmar, Thailand, Laos, Cambodia, and Vietnam. It grows mainly in subtropical regions, inhabiting thin forests.

== Natural resistance to glyphosate ==
Glyphosate is a widely used broad-spectrum herbicide. The resistance to it is primarily driven by changes in its target enzyme, 5-enolpyruvylshikimate-3-phosphate synthase (EPSPS). Compared to sensitive species such as Ageratum houstonianum, this plant shows inherently higher EPSPS activity. When exposed to glyphosate, it rapidly increases EPSPS mRNA and protein levels to maintain metabolic function. Few species are naturally resistant to glyphosate, such as Commelina communis, Abutilon theophrasti, and Chenopodium album, though other have evolved under selective pressure.
