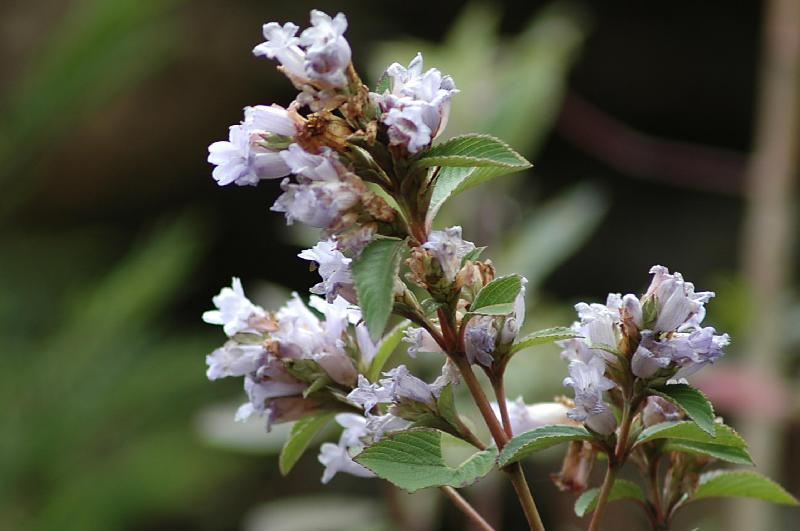

Conservation status
- Vulnerable (IUCN 3.1)

Scientific classification
- Kingdom: Plantae
- Clade: Tracheophytes
- Clade: Angiosperms
- Clade: Eudicots
- Clade: Asterids
- Order: Lamiales
- Family: Acanthaceae
- Genus: Strobilanthes
- Species: S. kunthiana

Binomial name
- Strobilanthes kunthiana (Wall. ex Nees) T. Anders. ex Benth.

= Strobilanthes kunthiana =

Species of shrub

Strobilanthes kunthiana, known as Kurinji or Neelakurinji in Tamil language and Malayalam and Gurige in Kannada, is a shrub of the bear's breeches family (Acanthaceae) that is found in the shola forests of the Western Ghats in Kerala, Karnataka and Tamil Nadu. The purplish blue flower blossoms only once in 12 years, and gave the Nilgiri Mountains range its name as nil (blue) + giri (mountains). Of all long interval bloomers (or plietesials) Strobilanthes kunthiana is the most rigorously demonstrated, with documented bloomings in 1838, 1850, 1862, 1874, 1886, 1898, 1910, 1922, 1934, 1946, 1958, 1970, 1982, 1994, 2006, 2018, and 2030, these have no match to Solar cycles. This plant flowers during September–October. In different parts of the Western Ghats, there are different populations of the same plants which have their own 12 year cycle. Some population bloomed in 1990, 2002 and 2014, putting it on a 2026,2038 cycle.

== Description ==
Kurinji grows at an altitude of 1300 meters to 2400 metres. The plant is usually 30 to 60 cm high. They can, however, grow well beyond 180 cm under congenial conditions.

The kurinji plant belongs to the genus Strobilanthes which was first scientifically described by Christian Gottfried Daniel Nees von Esenbeck in the 19th century. The genus has around 250 species, of which at least 46 are found in India. Most of these species show an unusual flowering behaviour, varying from annual to 16-year blooming cycles.

Plants that bloom at long intervals like Strobilanthes kunthiana are known as plietesials. Other commonly used expressions or terms which apply to part or all of the plietesial life history include gregarious flowering, mast seeding and supra-annual synchronized semelparity (semelparity = monocarpy).

Other kurinji species, such as Strobilanthes cuspidatus, bloom once every seven years, and then die. Their seeds subsequently sprout and continue the cycle of life and death.

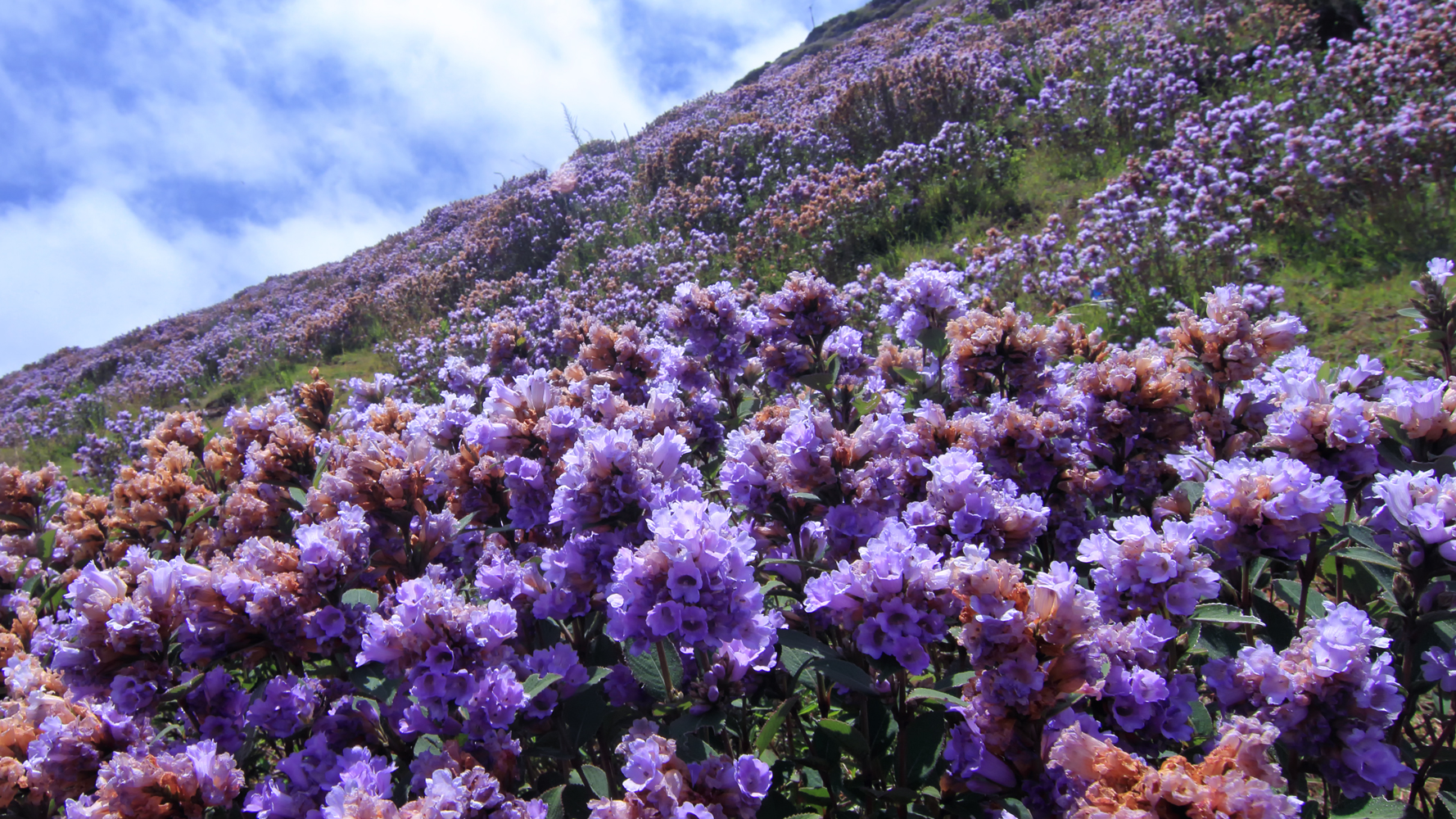
A hillside with mass flowering in 2018

=== Masting ===
Some species of Strobilanthes are examples of a mass seeding phenomenon termed as masting which can be defined as "synchronous production of seed at long intervals by a population of plants". Strict masting only occurs in species that are monocarpic (or semelparous) -- individuals of the species only reproduce once during their lifetime, then die, as is the case with Strobilanthes kunthiana.

== Etymology ==
The common name Neelakurinji originates from the Tamil Language, neela means blue, and kurinji means flower.

== Habitat ==
Kurinji once used to cover the Anamalai Hills, Cardamom Hills, Nilgiri Hills, Palani Hills, Kudremukh and Bababudangiri like a carpet during its flowering season. Now plantations and dwellings occupy much of their habitat. Neelakurinji also bloomed in Chandra Drona Hill Ranges (Bababudan Giri) in Chikkamagaluru district of Karnataka in 2006. The whole of Bababudangiri Hills (Datta Peeta) were covered in a carpet of bluish purple flowers. It last bloomed in 2018. Besides the Western Ghats, Neelakurinji is also seen in the Shevroy in the Eastern Ghats, Sanduru hills of Bellary district in Karnataka.

In 2006, Neelakurunji flowered again in Kerala and Tamil Nadu after a gap of 12 years.

In 2017, Neelakurinji flowers bloomed in the hills behind Kumaraswamy temple in Sanduru, Bellary district.

== Conservation ==
Kurinjimala Sanctuary protects the kurinji in approximately 32 km^{2} core habitat in Kottakamboor and Vattavada villages in Idukki district of Kerala. The Save Kurinji Campaign Council organizes campaigns and, programs for conservation of the Kurinji plant and its habit. Kurinji Andavar temple located in Kodaikanal on Tamil Nadu dedicated to Tamil God Murugan also preserves Strobilanthes plants.

== Cultural significance ==
The Paliyan tribal people living in Tamil Nadu use the plant's flowering cycle as a reference to calculate their age.

== References in literature ==
Kurinji flower is used to describe the associated mountainous landscape where it blooms in Sangam Literature classical Tamil literature. The historical novel, Kurinji Flowers by Clare Flynn features the neelakurinji as a backdrop to a tragic love affair in 1940s India.

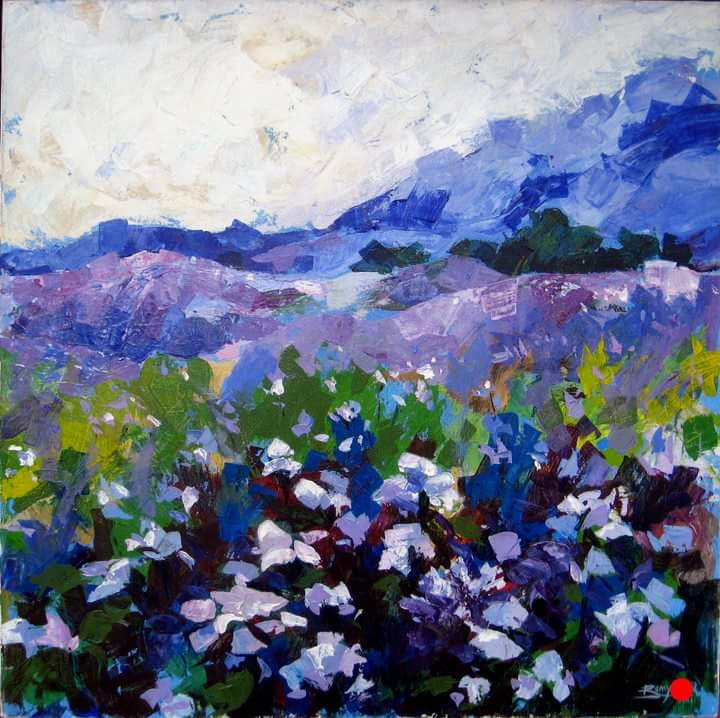
Kurinji

== See also ==
- Strobilanthes callosa
