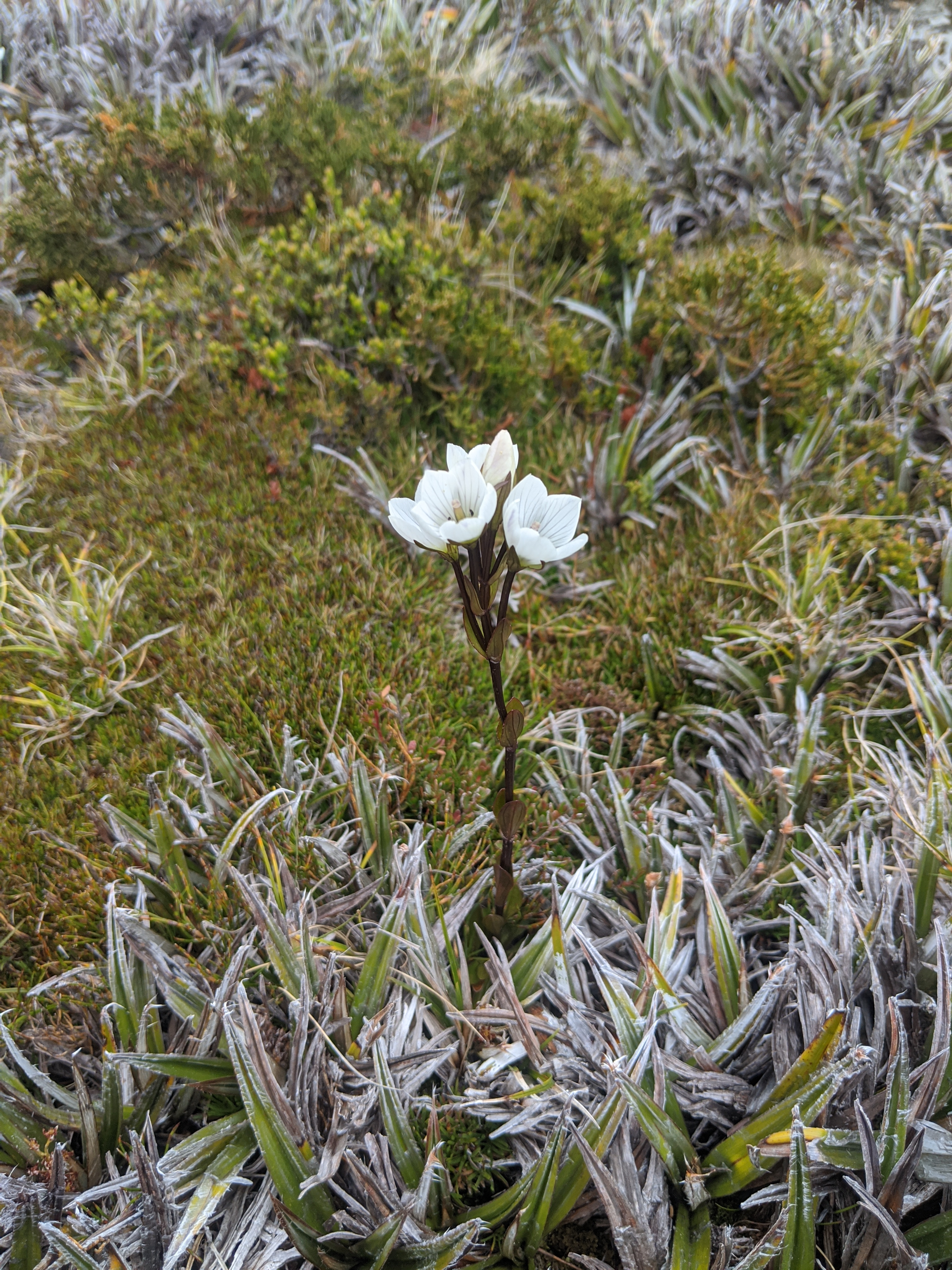
- Tasmanian snow-gentian, Tarn-shelf track, Mount Field National Park, Tasmania, February 2020. Photo courtesy of Rachel Meadowcroft.

Scientific classification
- Kingdom: Plantae
- Clade: Tracheophytes
- Clade: Angiosperms
- Clade: Eudicots
- Clade: Asterids
- Order: Gentianales
- Family: Gentianaceae
- Genus: Chionogentias
- Species: C. diemensis

Binomial name
- Chionogentias diemensis (Griseb.) L.G. Adams

Synonyms
- Gentiania diemensis; Gentiana montana var. diemensis

= Chionogentias diemensis =

Species of flowering plant

Chionogentias diemensis (syn. Gentianella diemensis) is a flowering herbaceous alpine plant in the family Gentianaceae, endemic to the island of Tasmania in Australia. It is commonly known as the Tasmanian mountain gentian. Chionogentias diemensis has been classified into two sub-species: the Tasmanian snow-gentian (Chionogentias diemensis subsp. diemensis) and the Ben Lomond snow-gentian (Chionogentias diemensis subsp. plantaginea).

== Description ==
Chionogentias diemensis is an erect alpine herb up to 30 cm high. Basal leaves are in a rosette, they are lanceolate to spatulate in shape with a prominent central vein. Stem leaves are stalkless and opposite. The colour of the stem and leaves can be bright green, but more commonly a dark purplish grey.

Flowers have 5 petals and are pure white or have grey-violet veins. Flowers can be solitary or in clusters, with sympodial branching. White, bowl-shaped flowers are able to attract many different types of insect pollinators, especially in regions where pollinators are scarce. Flowering occurs in alpine summer between February and April.

=== Subspecies ===
The two subspecies are easily distinguished, by both their location and their morphology.

The Tasmanian snow-gentian is monocarpic, it only flowers once in its lifetime. The basal leaves are the most obvious difference, they have a spatulate shape and are broader and round at the tip. The basal leaves are 20-30mm long and 5-10mm wide.

The Ben Lomond snow-gentian is polycarpic, and there are often remaining flower stems from previous years. The basal leaves are larger, up to 70mm long and 20mm wide. They are more lance shaped with a pointed tip. These features gives the plant its resemblance to Plantago.

== Habitat and distribution ==
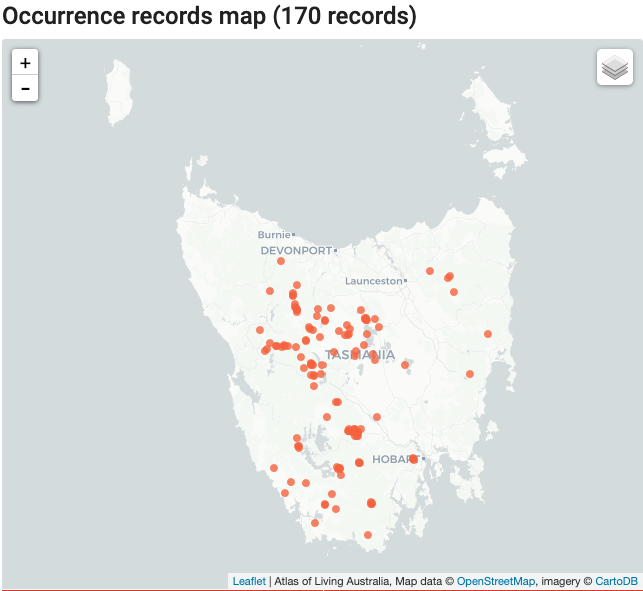
Species occurrences (distribution) of C. diemensis subsp. diemensis, from Atlas of Living Australia.

Chionogentias are endemic to Tasmania and are found widely in alpine and subalpine areas. They like damp grassland and heathlands, and you will sometimes see them growing out of cushion plants. They prefer moist soil, rich in organic matter that has a pH acidic to neutral.

Chionogentias diemensis subsp. diemensis is found at Mount field, Cradle Mountain, Mount Eliza, Hartz Mountain range and Lake St Clair. It is considered quite common in these areas. Harsh exposed conditions seem to be correlated with stunted height and multi-stemmed growth.

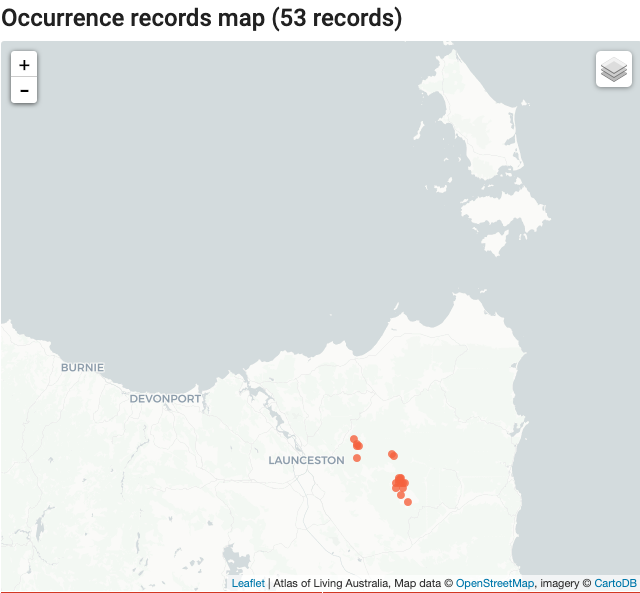
Species occurrences (distribution) of C. diemensis subsp. plantainea, from Atlas of Living Australia.

Chionogentias diemensis subsp. plantaginea is found in the alpine areas of Mount Barrow, Ben Nevis and Ben Lomond area in North East Tasmania, and is thought to be locally common.

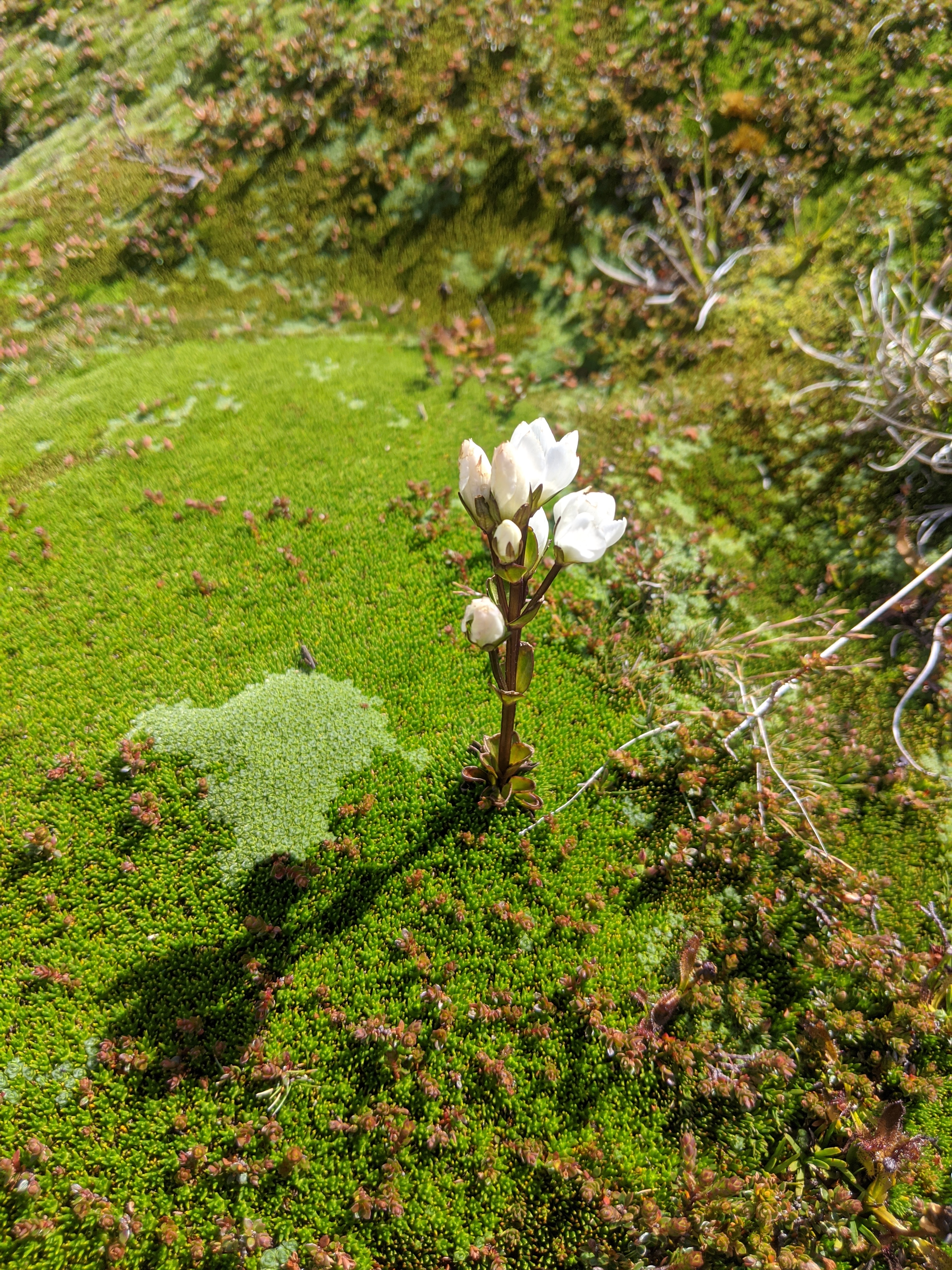
Tasmanian snow-gentian in cushion plant, Mount Field National Park, Tasmania, February 2020. Photo courtesy of Rachel Meadowcroft.

== Taxonomy ==
All Tasmanian gentians were included under Gentianella diemensis until 1995. (Adams 1995, 2020). They are now been transferred to the genus Chionogentias, which includes species outside of Australia and 14 within Australia. It has been noted that further collecting may warrant further taxonomic segregation.

== Etymology ==
“Chiono-“ comes from the Latinised form of Greek kion meaning snow. While “-gentias” refers to its family Gentianaceae, which named in honour of Gentius, King of Illyria who is said to have discovered the medicinal properties of the European yellow gentian, Gentiana lutea. "Diemensis" (dee-MEN-sis) is the latinisation of Van Diemens Land, the original name for Tasmania.

== Cultivation ==
It is not widely grown and has been found difficult to maintain. It has the potential to be grown in a container that receives full sunlight. They prefer well-drained soil, rich in organic matter, with pH that is acidic to neutral. The best way to cultivate it is propagation from seed. Seeds need to be fresh and stratified prior to planting.
