= Strobilanthes cuspidatus =

Scientific classification
- Kingdom: Plantae
- Clade: Tracheophytes
- Clade: Angiosperms
- Clade: Eudicots
- Clade: Asterids
- Order: Lamiales
- Family: Acanthaceae
- Genus: Strobilanthes
- Species: S. cuspidatus

Binomial name
- Strobilanthes cuspidatus T. Anders. ex Benth.

Species of shrub

Strobilanthes cuspidatus is a species of flowering shrub found in the Western Ghats of the west coast of India.

== Description ==
Cuspidatus grows at an elevation of over 1,000 metres above sea level on the eastern slopes of the Western Ghats, where circulating currents of hot air lead to slightly warmer weather than in upper slopes. It is distinguishable from other species of the genus Strobilanthes by the white underside of its leaves and slender spikes with sticky bracts and sepals. Individual shrubs stand two to five feet tall, with long-stalked, ovate leaves that are acuminate at both ends. The flowers bloom once every seven years.

The species was first identified by James Sykes Gamble and was named by Thomas Anderson.

== Conservation ==
The species is at risk from habitat destruction and invasive species. Specimens in the Nilgiri Mountains have been found near agricultural land and roads, putting them at risk of being cut down by people unaware of their rare status. Naturalists including A. K. Pradeep have called upon the Kerala Forest Department to collect seeds and grow them in protected areas to help protect the species.

== See also ==
- Strobilanthes callosa
- Strobilanthes kunthiana
