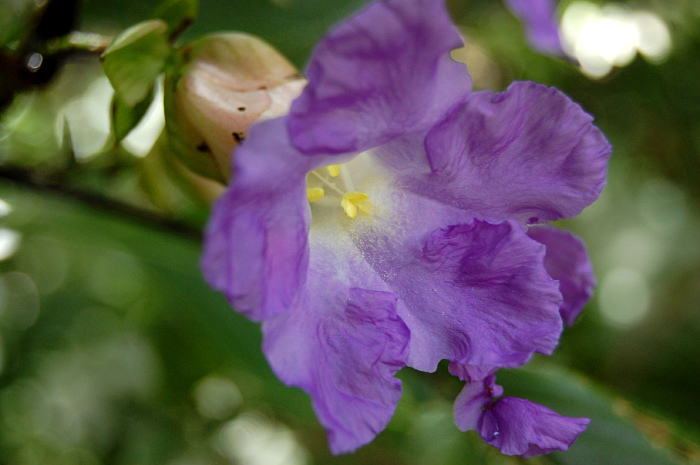

Scientific classification
- Kingdom: Plantae
- Clade: Tracheophytes
- Clade: Angiosperms
- Clade: Eudicots
- Clade: Asterids
- Order: Lamiales
- Family: Acanthaceae
- Genus: Strobilanthes
- Species: S. callosa

Binomial name
- Strobilanthes callosa Nees

Synonyms
- Carvia callosa (Nees) Bremek

= Strobilanthes callosa =

Species of plant known for distant flower cycles

Strobilanthes callosa (Synonym: Carvia callosa (Nees) Bremek) is a shrub found mainly in the low lying hills of the Western Ghats, all along the west coast of India. Its standardized Hindi name is maruadona (मरुआदोना) which it is called in the state of Madhya Pradesh where it is also found. In the state of Maharashtra, in the Marathi language, and other local dialects and in the neighboring state of Karnataka, the shrub is locally known as karvi (कारवी), sometimes spelled in English as karvy.

This shrub belongs to the genus Strobilanthes which was first scientifically described by Nees in the 19th century. The genus has around 350 species, of which at least 46 are found in India. Because most of these species show an unusual flowering behaviour, varying from annual to 16-year blooming cycles, there is often confusion on the national scale about which plant is flowering.

== Description ==
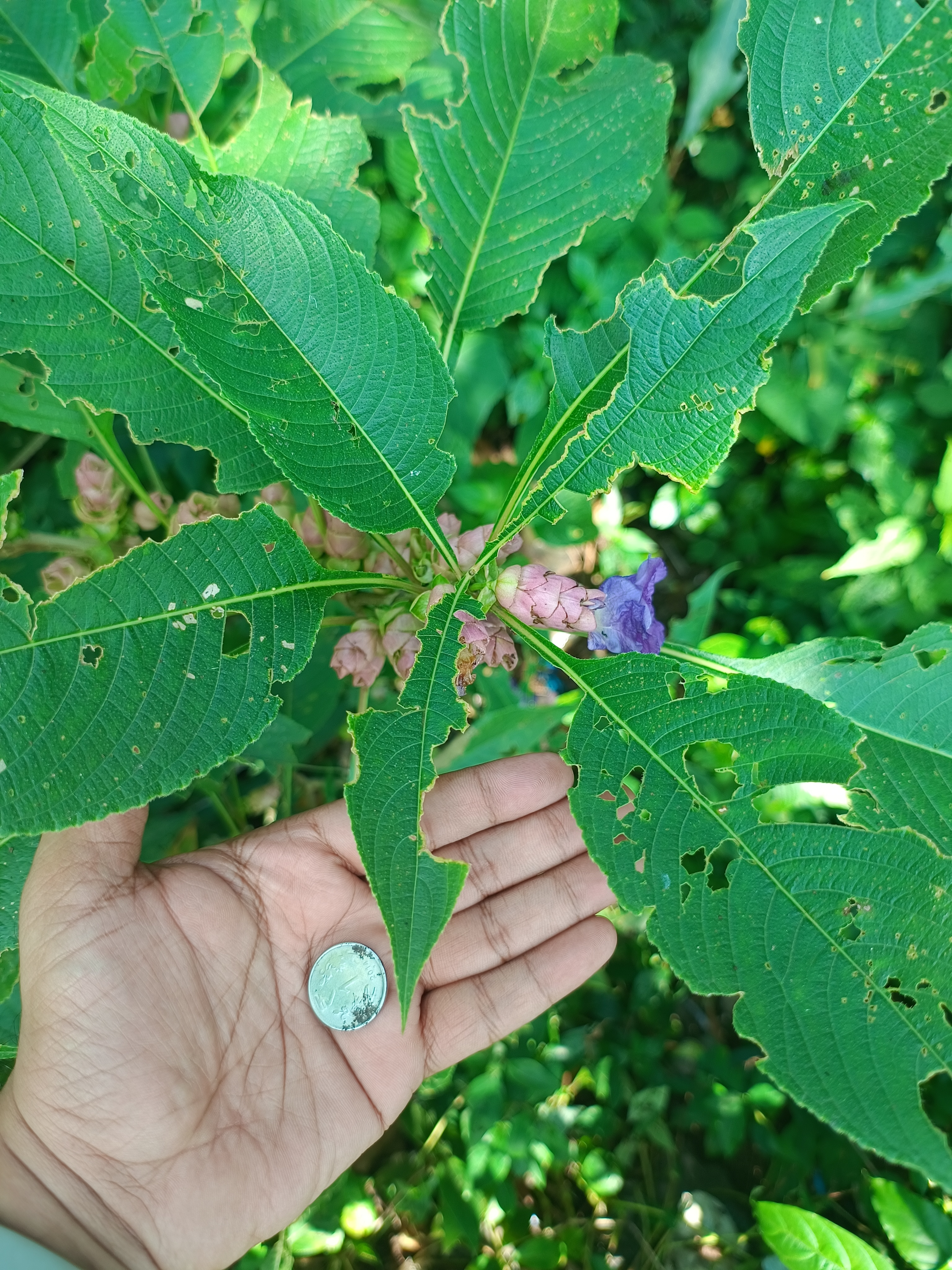
Strobilanthes callosa Plant spotted in SGNP Mumbai

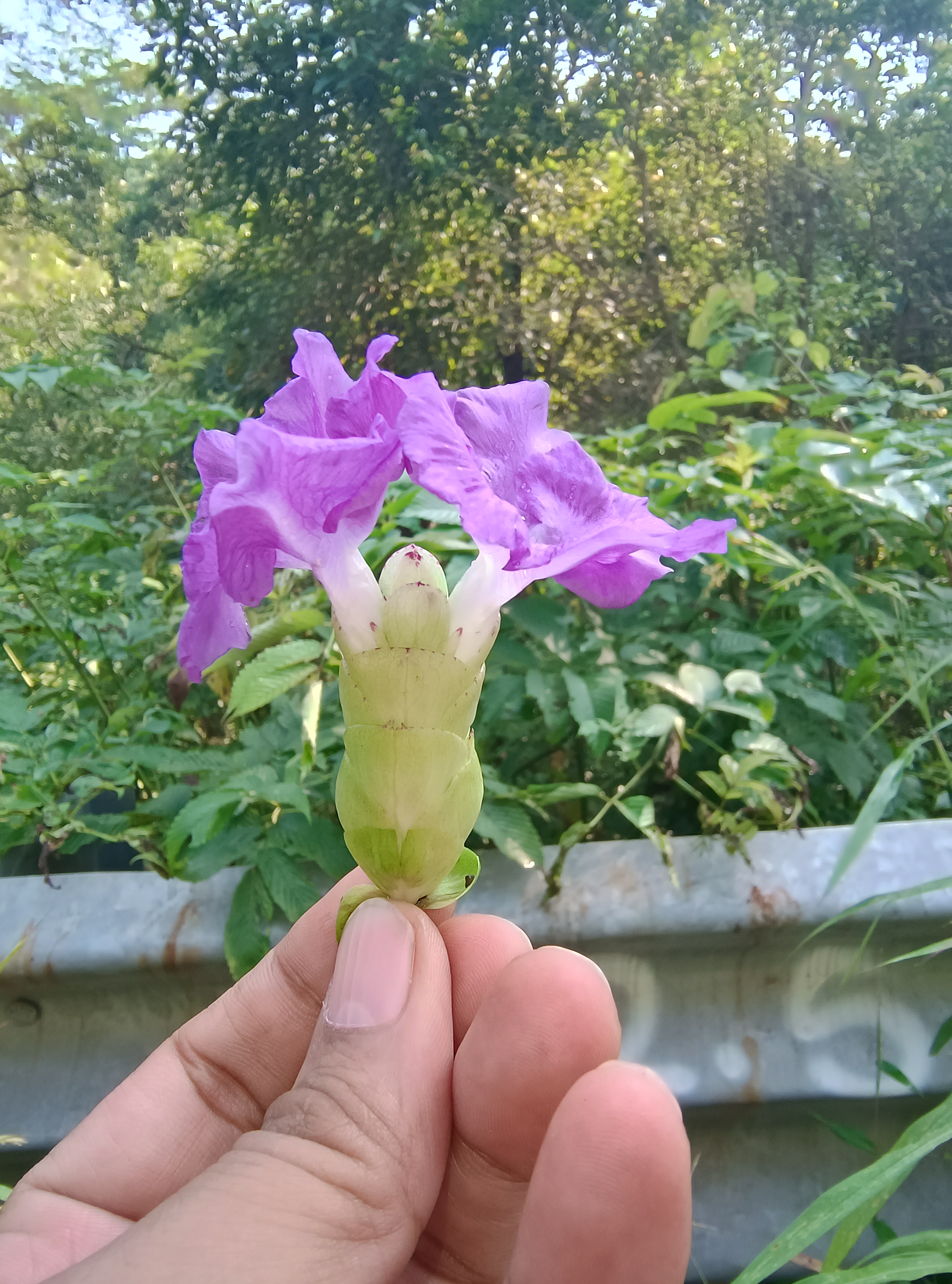
Flower of Strobilanthes callosa spotted in SGNP Mumbai

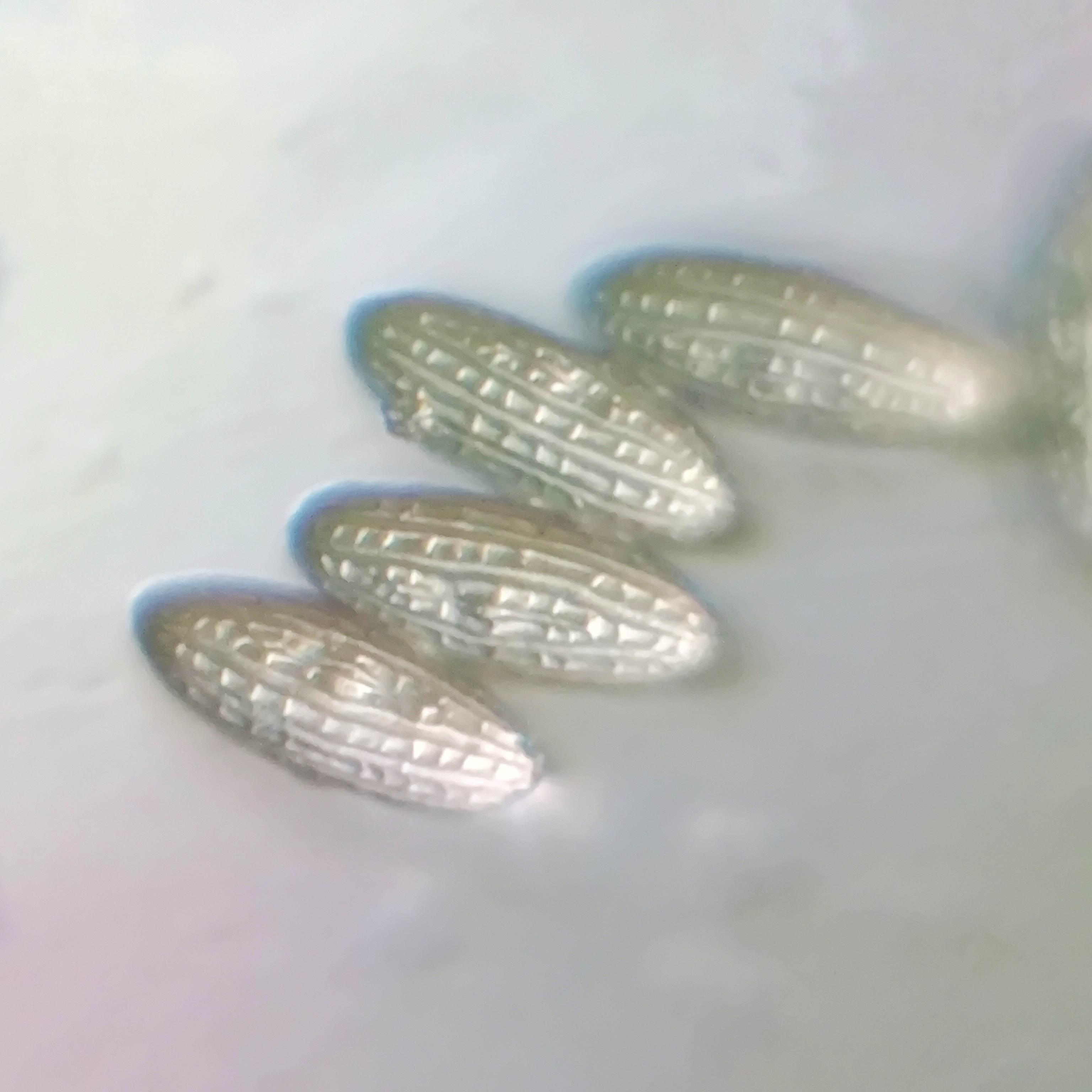
Pollen grains of Strobilanthes callosa taken with the Foldscope

It is a large shrub, sometimes attaining 6–20 ft in height and 2 1/2 inches in diameter and flowers between July and September. This plant is recognized for the fact that it takes nearly a decade for the bloom cycle to occur. Its leaves are home to several insects including caterpillars and snails which feed on it. The shrub has an interesting life cycle; It comes alive and green every year with the advent of monsoon, but once the rainy season is over, all that is left is dry and dead-looking stems. This pattern repeats itself for seven years, but in the eighth year the plant bursts into mass flowering.

Plants that bloom at long intervals like Strobilanthes callosa are known as plietesials, the term plietesial has been used in reference to perennial monocarpic plants “of the kind most often met with in the Strobilanthinae” (a subtribe of Acanthaceae containing Strobilanthes and allied genera) that usually grow gregariously, flower simultaneously following a long interval, set seed, and die. Other commonly used expressions or terms which apply to part or all of the plietesial life history include gregarious flowering, mast seeding, and supra-annual synchronized semelparity (semelparity = monocarpy).

In 1953 Sharfuddin Khan describing the plant in the former Hyderabad State wrote:

Botanical Name - Strobilanthes callosus

Strobilanthes, Blume.; F.B.I. IV-429. S. callosus, Nees.; F.B.I. IV-451. Brandi's Ind. Trees, 500. Gamble's Ind. Timbers, 518. Vern. Karvi, Mar.

A large shrub, sometimes attaining 6-20 ft. in height and 2 1/2 inches in diameter; branches often warted or scabrous-tubercled. Leaves opposite, 7 by 3 in., sometimes much larger, crenate, rough, conspicuously marked with five lines above, nerves 8-16 pair; petiole 2-3 in. Flowers in strobiliform spikes 1-4 in. long, often densely or laxly cymose; bracts 1/2 - 1 in. long, orbicular or elliptic. Calyx 1/2 in., in fruit often exceeding 3/4 in., sub-equally 5-lobed to the base; segments oblong, obtuse, softly hairy. Corolla tubular-ventricose, 1 1/2 in., glabrous without, very hairy within, deep blue; lobes 5, nearly equal, contorted in bud. Stamens 4; filaments hairy downwards; anthers blunt; not spurred at the base. Ovary 4-ovuled; style linear; stigma of one long linear-lanceolate branch the other minute. Capsule 3/4 by 1/3 in., seeds more than 1/3 in. long, thin, obovate, acute, densely shaggy with white inelastic adpressed hair, except on the large oblong areoles.

Tolerably common on the Kannad and Ajanta ghats in Aurangabad. In 'List of Trees, Shrubs, etc., of the Bombay Presidency,' Talbot remarks. "It covers large areas on the Konkan and N. Kanara ghats, and forms the undergrowth in many of the deciduous moist forests. Sometimes a very large shrub (30 ft., high and 2 1/2 in. in diameter). A general flowering takes place every seven or eight years. The white glabrous bracts become covered, after the flowering is over, with viscous strongly smelling hairs. The flowers vary in colour from purple-blue to pink. A general flowering of this species in N. Kanara, took place in Sept-Oct. 1887. The capsules ripen during the cold and hot seasons, and are elastically dehiscent, making a peculiar, almost continuous, noise during the shedding of the seeds in a forest of this species".

— Sharfuddin Khan, M. D. Forest flora of Hyderabad State. AP Forest Division, India; 1953.

In 1956 during the Reorganisation of the Indian States based along linguist lines, the above-mentioned state of Hyderabad was split up between Andhra Pradesh, Bombay state (later divided into states of Maharashtra and Gujarat in 1960 with the original portions of Hyderabad becoming part of the state of Maharashtra) and Karnataka.

=== Eight year bloom cycle and mass flowering ===
The Strobilanthes callosa bush typically takes seven years to grow. It is only in its eighth year that it bursts into bloom. At that time the pink and white buds bear bright purple (purplish blue) flowers in a mass flowering which covers multiple forest areas with a colorful lavender blush of buds with a tinge of pink with its profusion of violet blooms, after this once in a lifetime mass flowering the bush finally dies out. The flowers are rich in pollen and nectar and attract a wide range of species of butterflies, birds and insects including honey bees and carpenter bees that come to feed on their nectar.

Typically the lifespan of a single Strobilanthes callosa bloom lasts between 15 and 20 days and its mass blooming usually extends from mid-August to September-end.

After the mass flowering, the shrub is covered with fruits which are dry by the next year. With the coming of the monsoon and the first rains in the next year, the dried fruits absorb moisture and burst open with a pop, the hillsides where Strobilanthes callosa grows are filled with these loud popping sounds of dried seed pods bursting open somewhat explosively dehiscing their seeds for dispersal and soon new plants germinate taking root in the wet forest floor.

=== Masting ===
Some species of Strobilanthes including this one are examples of a mass seeding phenomenon termed as masting which can be defined as "synchronous production of seed at long intervals by a population of plants", strict masting only occurs in species that are monocarpic (or semelparous) -- individuals of the species only reproduce once during their lifetime, then die.

== Distribution ==
Strobilanthes callosa which is mostly peculiar to the hills of the Western Ghats (Sahyadris) in India can be seen growing wild around Mumbai, Tansa, Khandala, Bhimashankar, Malshej Ghat, Basgadh, Anjaneri, Dhodap, Salher-Mulher (Nashik region), Mulshi, Aurangabad (common on the Kannad and Ajanta ghats), Konkan etc. in the state of Maharashtra, parts of the state of Madhya Pradesh, parts of the state of Gujarat and in large areas of Belagavi and Uttara Kannada Ghats in the state of Karnataka among other places all along the Western Ghat hills on the west coast of India.

== Medicinal uses ==
While the leaves of Strobilanthes callosa are poisonous, and unfit for human consumption, the plant is used as a traditional medicinal herb by the local adivasi tribals and villagers for the treatment of inflammatory disorders. Its leaves are crushed and the juice obtained is believed to be a sure cure for stomach ailments.

The plant has been the subject of scientific research which confirms its use in folk medicine as a valid anti-inflammatory and antimicrobial herbal drug with anti-rheumatic activity.

Related species include Strobilanthes cusia BREMEK (大青葉, Da Ching Yeh, タイセイヨウ), used in Chinese and Japanese herbal medicine, and Strobilanthes forrestii Diels (Wei Niu Xi), used in Chinese herbal medicine.

== Other uses ==
Strobilanthes callosa has sturdy stems which along with its leaves is generally used by the local adivasi tribals and villagers as thatching material to build their huts.

Immediately after its mass flowering the Karvi honey collected by wild bee honey hunters is a popular local delicacy, it is much thicker and darker than other varieties.

== Control methods ==
The following Western Ghats forestry report from the year 1908 of Ankola high forests in coastal Karnataka (then under Bombay Presidency), provides methods to clear and control this shrub, when required, from spreading uncontrollably into unwanted areas:

() That the growth of Karvi (Sirobilanthes callosus) in many places is very heavy and is a direct check on natural regeneration. To get rid of this weed is difficult, though probably not impossible. In the Jaunsar Division areas were successfully treated in 1906 by cutting S. Wallichi when the flowers were fully out and the fruit had begun to form, but was not actually ripe. The Strobilanthes callosus flowers every seventh or eight year in Uttara Kannada and then dies down, so that, at the period of flowering, it might be treated in a similar way with advantage. It should be borne in mind that cutting off the heads of Karvi when it first com- mences to flower is useless, as it then puts out sideshoots which flower later; it can therefore only be treated when the flowers begin to fall. The time of flowering is given as September and October. ...Karvi is the difficulty here, with care it should be burnt directly after flowering. Seed-lings will suffer relatively little by burning as they have only appeared in the patches where Karvi is absent.

— WORKING PLAN REPORT UC-NRLF ANKOLA HIGH FOREST BLOCKS XXIV & XXV BY E. S. PEAESON, I. F. S., F. L. S., Deputy Conservator of Forests, WORKING PLANS, S. C. 1908- BOMBAY PRINTED AT THE GOVERNMENT CENTRAL PRESS 1910

== Common in the hills near Mumbai ==
The Karvi bush as it is locally known grows in abundance in the western ghat hills near the metropolis of Mumbai including throughout the Sanjay Gandhi National Park as in other parts of its natural range. In Sanjay Gandhi National Park its latest bloomings took place in 2000, then in 2008, and it is scheduled to bloom there again in 2016. Termed by nature enthusiasts as 'nature's miracle', its maximum bloom can be seen on some of the inner paths and trails that lie undisturbed in the park. It survives best on vast slopy expanses on the hillsides with Kanheri Caves area of the national park being one of the best places to observe large blooming expanses.

In the state of Maharashtra in the neighborhood of Mumbai the mass flowering of Karvi has been observed to occur in the same year as Mumbai in Khandala and one year earlier in Bhimashankar and Malshej, beyond Kalyan.

Local conservation NGOs like the Bombay Natural History Society (BNHS) and World Wide Fund for Nature - India (WWF-India) bring groups of city-dwelling people from Mumbai and elsewhere, sometimes in collaboration with other organizations, for regular nature walks in the nature trails of Sanjay Gandhi National Park and organize special trips every eight years when the rare Karvi flowers are in full bloom.

Near Mumbai, the Karvi is also found in Karnala, the Yeoor hills, Tungareshwar and some parts of Goregaon including Film City.
