= Plietesials =

Plants that flower as a group after many years without flowering

Plietesials are perennial flowering plants that grow for many years without flowering, then flower gregariously (synchronously), set seed, and die. The length of this cycle usually varies between 8 and 16 years. For example, the neelakurinji plant (Strobilanthes kunthiana), in the family Acanthaceae, flowers predictably every 12 years, blooming as expected in 2006 and 2018 in the Munnar region of Kerala, India.

Other commonly used expressions or terms describing a plietesial life history include gregarious flowering, mast seeding, and supra-annual synchronized semelparity (in botany, semelparity is more specifically referred to as monocarpy).

Certain species in unrelated families of flowering plants, such as in the Arecaceae, Scrophulariaceae, Fabaceae, Apocynaceae, and Acanthaceae, are plietesial. This type of life history is especially well-known among certain species of bamboo (family Poaceae), some of which have a flowering cycle of 40 to 50 years. It remains unclear why gregarious flowering after long intervals of vegetative reproduction is so invariably associated with death shortly after flowering, although both are associated with higher reproductive outputs.

== In Strobilanthes ==
In the genus Strobilanthes, there is considerable variation in life history strategies. Most known plietesial members of Strobilanthes take between 10 and 15 years to flower gregariously (usually 12, although 5- to 9-year cycles have also been reported). Even so, the flowering periodicity is rarely perfectly uniform across all individuals in the population, with the result that the asynchronous flowering of some fraction of individuals in non-mass-flowering years is not uncommon. In some species, mass flowering occurs over a wide area on a species-specific cycle; in other species, geographically isolated populations of the same species follow their own distinct cycles. Some species flower gregariously in certain years but do not die following the mass flowering, and are therefore not plietesial. At least one species of Strobilanthes exhibits different flowering patterns in different portions of its range: the perennial Strobilanthes wallichii flowers annually in the eastern Himalayan portion of its range and plietesially in the western Himalayan portion (Wood 1994). For some taxa, reports of life history in the botanical literature are ambiguous. For example, Robinson (1935) noted a 12-year plietesial cycle for Strobilanthes consanguineus C.B. Clarke; whereas Bowden (1950) indicated that this species flowers every year. These discrepancies likely result either from misidentifications or from life history variations within taxa.

== See also ==
- Mast (botany)
- Monocarpy
- Reproductive synchrony
