= Monocarpy =

Botanical life strategy

Monocarpy refers to a reproductive strategy in plants in which the plant will flower and set seeds only once in its lifetime, and then die. The term is derived from Greek (mono, "single" + karpos, "fruit" or "grain"), and was first used by Alphonse de Candolle. Other terms with the same meaning are hapaxanth and semelparous. The antonym is polycarpic, a plant that flowers and sets seeds many times during its lifetime; the antonym of semelparous is iteroparous. Plants which flower en masse (gregariously) before dying are known as plietesials. The term hapaxanth is most often in conjunction with describing some of the taxa of Arecaceae (palms) and some species of bamboo, but rarely used otherwise; its antonym is pleonanth. This was first used by Alexander Braun.

Monocarpic plants are not necessarily annuals, because some monocarpic plants can live a number of years before they will flower. In some monocarpic plants, flowering signals senescence, while in others the production of fruit and seeds causes changes within the plants which lead to death. These changes are induced by chemicals that act as hormones, redirecting the resources of the plants from the roots and leaves to the production of fruits and or seeds.

Monocot plant families that include monocarpic species include Agavaceae such as the century plant and other Agave and some yuccas, Araceae, Arecaceae, Bromeliaceae some in the genus Puya and Tillandsia utriculata, Musaceae such as the banana trees (Musa), and Poaceae such as bamboos, which can take 8 to 20 years or in the case some Phyllostachys species even take over 100 years to bloom and then die. Dicot plant families that include monocarpic species include Acanthaceae, Apocynaceae, Asteraceae, and Fabaceae. Hawaiian silverswords and their relatives in the genus Wilkesia, which are Asteraceans, may take 10–50 years before flowering. Few dicot shrubs with multiple branching and secondary growth species have been described. Those that have include Strobilanthes species, Cerberiopsis candelabrum, Tachigali versicolor and other Tachigali species.

Some monocarpic plants can be kept alive if the flowers are removed as soon as they have finished blooming before seed formation begins, or if the flower buds are removed before they begin blooming.

== See also ==
- Polycarpic
- Mast (botany)
- Strobilanthes callosa
- Strobilanthes kunthiana
