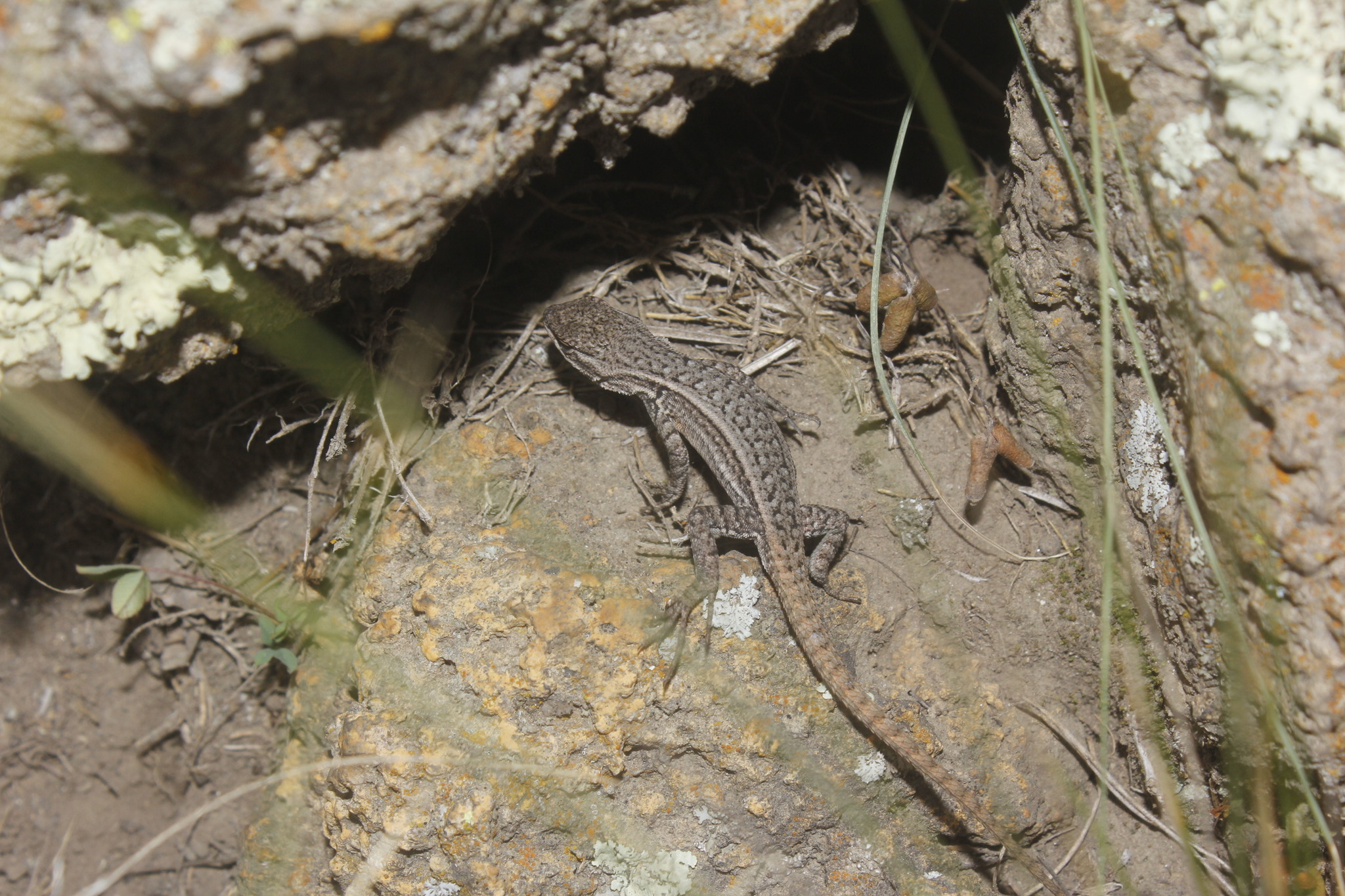

Conservation status
- Least Concern (IUCN 3.1)

Scientific classification
- Domain: Eukaryota
- Kingdom: Animalia
- Phylum: Chordata
- Class: Reptilia
- Order: Squamata
- Suborder: Iguania
- Family: Phrynosomatidae
- Genus: Sceloporus
- Species: S. bicanthalis

Binomial name
- Sceloporus bicanthalis Smith, 1937

Synonyms
- Sceloporus aeneus bicanthalis Smith, 1937

= Sceloporus bicanthalis =

Species of lizard

Sceloporus bicanthalis, the trans volcanic bunchgrass lizard, is a species of lizard in the family Phrynosomatidae, first described by Hobart Muir Smith as a subspecies of Sceloporus aeneus in 1937. It is endemic to Mexico. It was classified by the IUCN as a species with low risk. No subspecies are recognized.

== Description ==
Sceloporus bicanthalis is a small, viviparous lizard measuring on average 45 mm (1.8 in) in snout–vent length.

== Distribution and habitat ==
Sceloporus bicanthalis ranges eastwards from the eastern Valley of Mexico to the eastern end the Trans-Mexican Volcanic Belt, and into the northern Sierra Madre de Oaxaca.

This species is associated with tussock (bunchgrass) grassland habitats within open pine forests at elevations of 2,900–4,400 m (9,500–14,400 ft) asl.
