= Semelparity and iteroparity =

Classes of possible reproductive strategies

Semelparity and iteroparity are two reproductive strategies available to living organisms. A species is semelparous if it is characterized by a single reproductive episode before death, and iteroparous if it is characterized by multiple reproductive cycles. Iteroparity can be further divided into continuous iteroparity (e.g., primates, including humans and chimpanzees) and seasonal iteroparity (e.g. birds, dogs, etc.). Some botanists use the parallel terms monocarpy and polycarpy.

In truly semelparous species, death after reproduction is part of an overall strategy that includes putting all available resources into maximizing reproduction, at the expense of future life (see § Trade-offs). In any iteroparous population there will be some individuals who happen to die after their first and before any second reproductive episode, but unless this is part of a syndrome of programmed death after reproduction, this would not be called "semelparity".

This distinction is also related to the difference between annual and perennial plants: An annual is a plant that completes its life cycle in a single season, and is usually semelparous. Perennials live for more than one season and are usually (but not always) iteroparous.

Semelparity and iteroparity are not, strictly speaking, alternative strategies, but end points along a continuum of possible modes of reproduction, although such intermediates are rare. Many organisms considered to be semelparous can, under certain conditions, survive their first bout of reproduction to reproduce two or more times.

== Overview ==
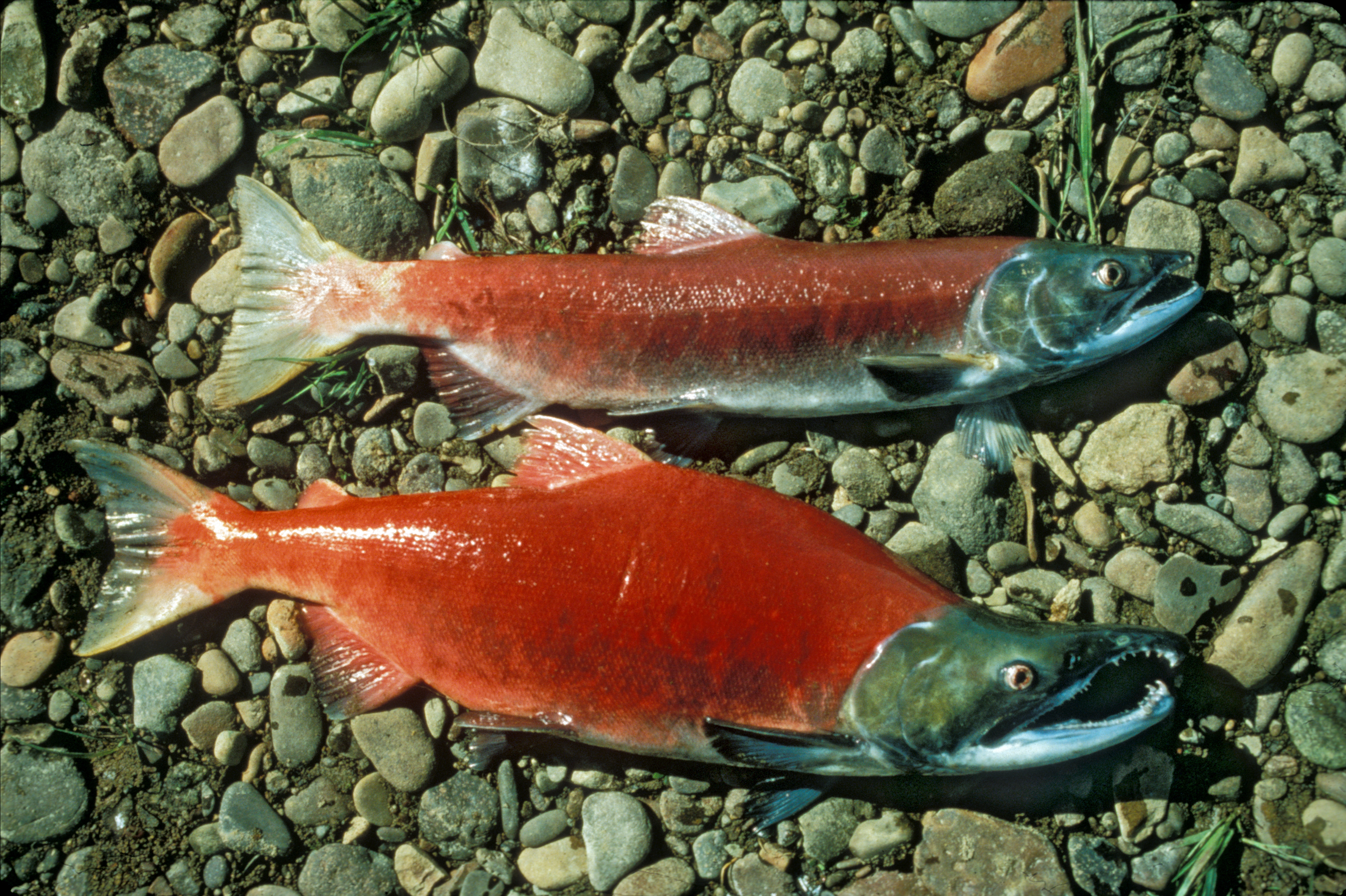
Pacific salmon are examples of semelparous organisms.

=== Semelparity ===
The word "semelparity" was coined by evolutionary biologist Lamont Cole, and comes from the Latin semel ('once, a single time') and pario ('to beget'). This differs from iteroparity in that iteroparous species are able to have multiple reproductive cycles and therefore can mate more than once in their lifetime. Semelparity is also known as "big bang" reproduction, since the single reproductive event of semelparous organisms is usually large as well as fatal. A classic example of a semelparous organism is (most) Pacific salmon (Oncorhynchus spp.), which live for many years in the ocean before swimming to the freshwater stream of its birth, spawning, and dying. Other semelparous animals include many insects, including some species of butterflies, cicadas, and mayflies, many arachnids, and some molluscs such as some species of squid and octopus.

Semelparity also occurs in smelt and capelin, but other than bony fish it is a very rare strategy in vertebrates. In amphibians, it is known only among some Hyla frogs including the gladiator frog; in reptiles only a few lizards such as Labord's chameleon of southwestern Madagascar, Sceloporus bicanthalis of the high mountains of Mexico, and some species of Ichnotropis from dry savanna areas of Africa. Among mammals, it exists only in a few didelphid and dasyurid marsupials. Annual plants, including all grain crops and most domestic vegetables, are semelparous. Long-lived semelparous plants include century plant (agave), Lobelia telekii, and some species of bamboo.

This form of lifestyle is consistent with r-selected strategies as many offspring are produced and there is low parental input, as one or both parents die after mating. In semelparous mammals, all of the male's energy is diverting into mating and the immune system is repressed. High levels of corticosteroids are sustained over long periods of time. This triggers immune and inflammatory system failure and gastrointestinal hemorrhage, which eventually leads to death.

=== Iteroparity ===
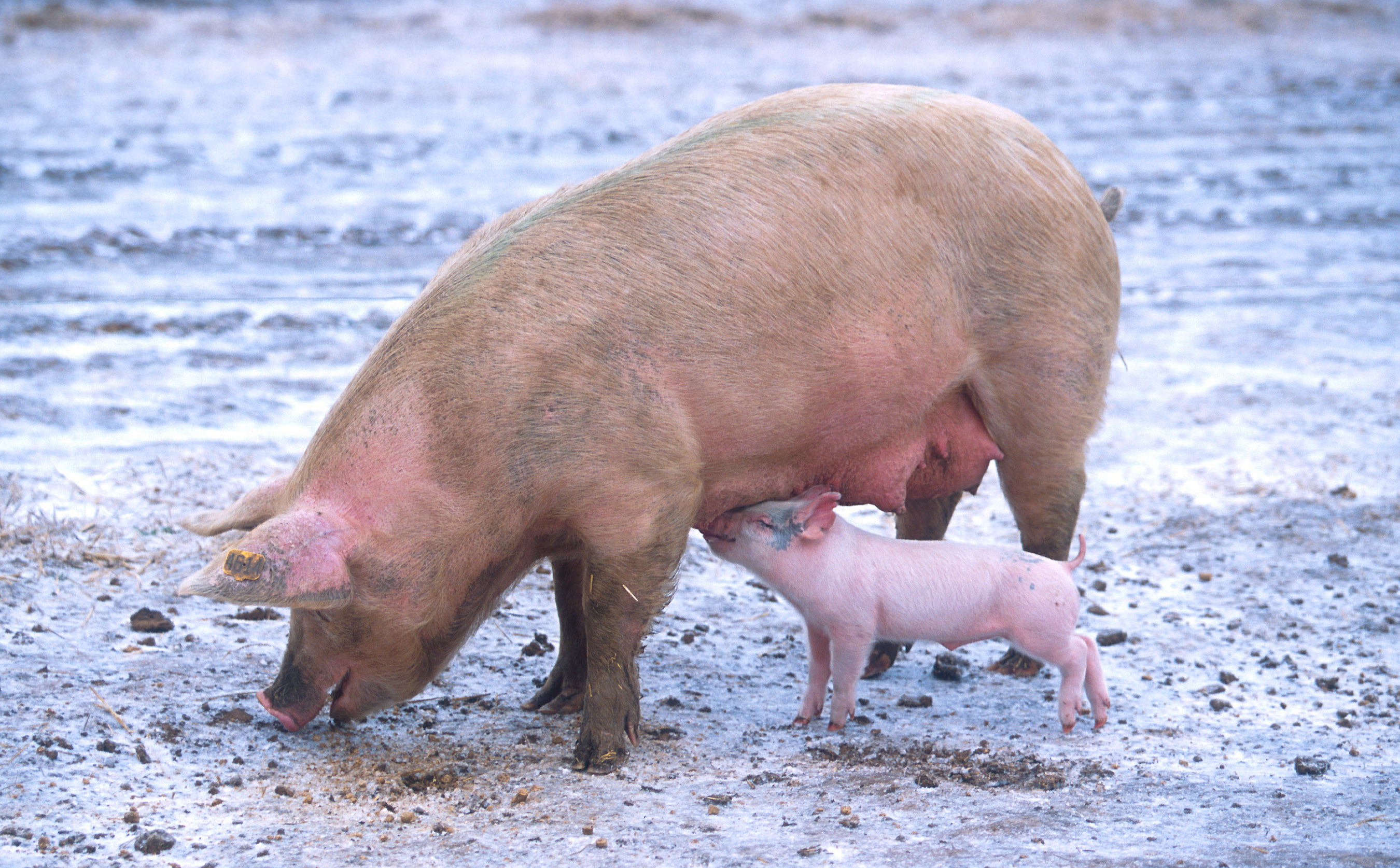
An iteroparous organism is one that can undergo many reproductive events throughout its lifetime. The pig is an example of an iteroparous organism.

The term iteroparity comes from the Latin itero, to repeat, and pario, to beget. An example of an iteroparous organism is a human—humans are biologically capable of having offspring many times over the course of their lives.

Iteroparous vertebrates include all birds, most reptiles, virtually all mammals, and most fish. Among invertebrates, most mollusca and many insects (for example, mosquitoes and cockroaches) are iteroparous. Most perennial plants are iteroparous.

== Models ==
=== Trade-offs ===
It is a biological precept that within its lifetime an organism has a limited amount of energy/resources available to it, and must always partition it among various functions such as collecting food and finding a mate. Of relevance here is the trade-off between fecundity, growth, and survivorship in its life history strategy. These trade-offs come into play in the evolution of iteroparity and semelparity. It has been repeatedly demonstrated that semelparous species produce more offspring in their single fatal reproductive episode than do closely related iteroparous species in any one of theirs. However, the opportunity to reproduce more than once in a lifetime, and possibly with greater care for the development of offspring produced, can offset this strictly numerical benefit.

=== Models based on non-linear trade-offs ===
One class of models that tries to explain the differential evolution of semelparity and iteroparity examines the shape of the trade-off between offspring produced and offspring forgone. In economic terms, offspring produced is equivalent to a benefit function, while offspring forgone is comparable to a cost function. The reproductive effort of an organism—the proportion of energy that it puts into reproducing, as opposed to growth or survivorship—occurs at the point where the distance between offspring produced and offspring forgone is the greatest.

Iteroparous reproductive effort

In some situations, the marginal cost of offspring produced decreases over time (each additional offspring is less "expensive" than the average of all previous offspring) and the marginal cost of offspring forgone increases. In these cases, the organism only devotes a portion of its resources to reproduction and uses the rest for growth and survivorship so that it can reproduce again in the future.

Semelparous reproductive effort

In other situations, the marginal cost of offspring produced increases while the marginal cost of offspring forgone decreases. When this is the case, it is favorable for the organism to reproduce a single time. The individual devotes all of its resources to that one episode of reproduction, then dies as it has not reserved enough resources to meet its own ongoing survival needs.

Empirical, quantitative support for this mathematical model is limited.

=== Bet-hedging models ===
A second set of models examines the possibility that iteroparity is a hedge against unpredictable juvenile survivorship (avoiding putting all one's eggs in one basket). Again, mathematical models have not found empirical support from real-world systems. In fact, many semelparous species live in habitats characterized by high (not low) environmental unpredictability, such as deserts and early successional habitats.

=== Cole's paradox and demographic models ===
The models that have the strongest support from living systems are demographic. In Lamont Cole's classic 1954 paper, he came to the conclusion that:

For an annual species, the absolute gain in intrinsic population growth which could be achieved by changing to the perennial reproductive habit would be exactly equivalent to adding one individual to the average litter size.

For example, imagine two species—an iteroparous species that has annual litters averaging three offspring each, and a semelparous species that has one litter of four, and then dies. These two species have the same rate of population growth, which suggests that even a tiny fecundity advantage of one additional offspring would favor the evolution of semelparity. This is known as Cole's paradox.

In his analysis, Cole assumed that there was no mortality of individuals of the iteroparous species, even seedlings. Twenty years later, Charnov and Schaffer showed that reasonable differences in adult and juvenile mortality yield much more reasonable costs of semelparity, essentially solving Cole's paradox. An even more general demographic model was produced by Young.

These demographic models have been more successful than the other models when tested with real-world systems. It has been shown that semelparous species have higher expected adult mortality, making it more economical to put all reproductive effort into the first (and therefore final) reproductive episode.

== Semelparity ==
=== Semelparity in mammals ===
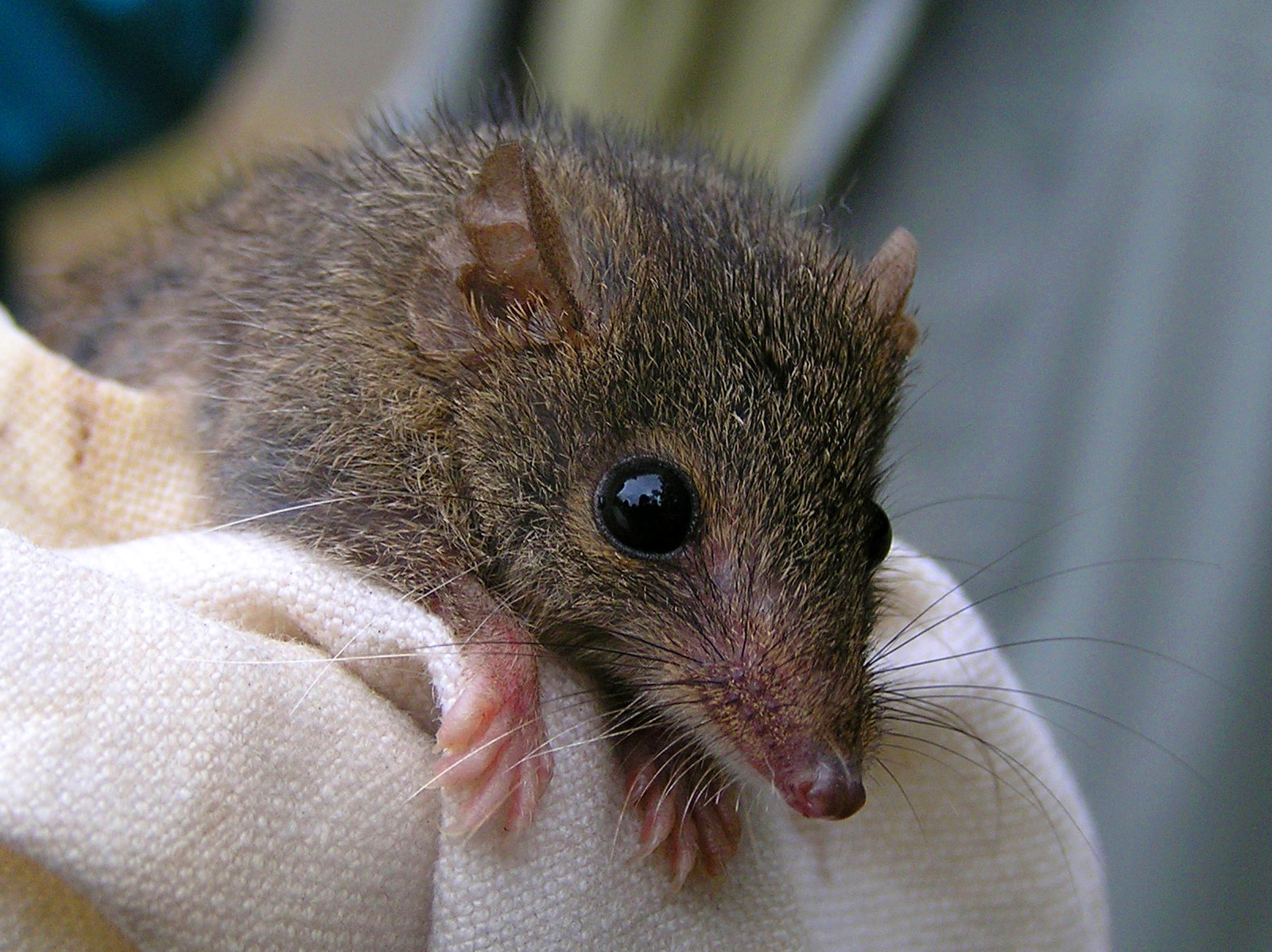
Antechinus agilis

==== In Dasyuridae ====
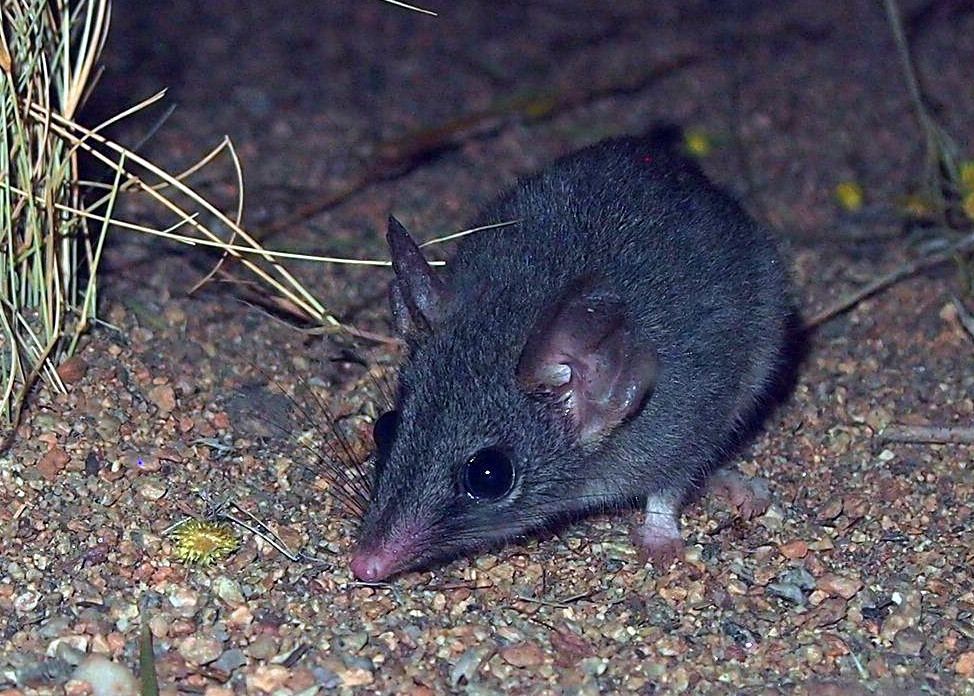
Phascogale calura

Semelparous species of Dasyuridae are typically small and carnivorous, with the exception of the northern quoll (Dasyurus hallucatus), which is large. Species with this reproductive strategy include members of the genus Antechinus, Phascogale tapoatafa and Phascogale culura. The males of all three groups exhibit similar characteristics that classify them as semelparous: First, all of the males of each species disappear immediately after the mating season. Also, males that are captured and isolated from others live for 2 to 3 years. If these captured males are allowed to mate, they die immediately after the mating season, like those in the wild. Their behaviour also changes drastically before and after the mating season. Before mating, males are extremely aggressive and will fight with other males if placed close together. Males that are captured before they are allowed to mate remain aggressive through the winter months. After the mating season, if allowed to mate, males become extremely lethargic and never regain their aggressiveness even if they survive to the next mating season. Other changes that occur post-mating include fur degradation and testicular degeneration. During adolescence, male fur is thick and becomes dull and thin after mating, but regains its original condition if the individual manages to survive past the mating season. The fur on the scrotum completely falls off and does not grow back, even if the male survives months after the first mating season. As the marsupial ages, its testicles grow until they reach a peak size and weight at the beginning of the mating season. After the individual mates, the weight and size of the testes and scrotum decrease. They remain small and do not produce spermatozoa later in life, if maintained in a laboratory. The 1966 Woolley study on Antechinus spp. noticed that males were only able to be maintained past mating in the laboratory, and no senile males were found in the wild, suggesting that all males die shortly after mating.

==== Northern quoll (Dasyurus hallucatus) ====
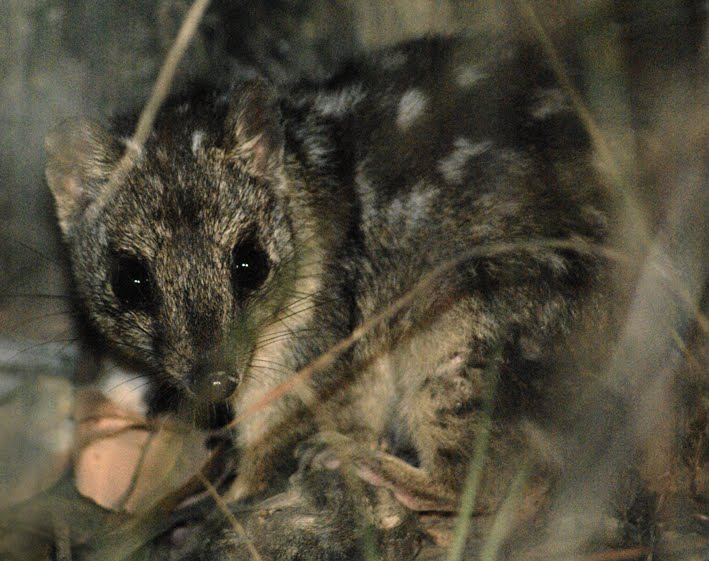
Dasyurus hallucatus

Dasyurus hallucatus, the northern quoll, is a large dasyurid and exhibits increased male mortality after the mating season. Unlike smaller dasyurids, male die-off in D. hallucatus is not due to endocrine system changes, and there was no observed spermatogenic failure after the mating season ended. If male D. hallucatus survive past their first mating season, they may be able to engage in a second mating season. While the individuals in a 2001 study mostly died from vehicles or predation, researchers found evidence of physiological degradation in males, similar to the physiological degradation in small dasyurids. This includes fur loss, parasite infestations, and weight loss. As the mating period went on, males became increasingly anemic, but the anemia was not due to ulceration or gastrointestinal bleeding. Lack of elevated cortisol levels during mating periods in D. hallucatus means that there is no current universal explanation for the mechanism behind increased male mortality in Dasyuridae. Post-reproductive senescence has also been proposed as an explanation.

===== Corticosteroid concentration and increased male mortality =====
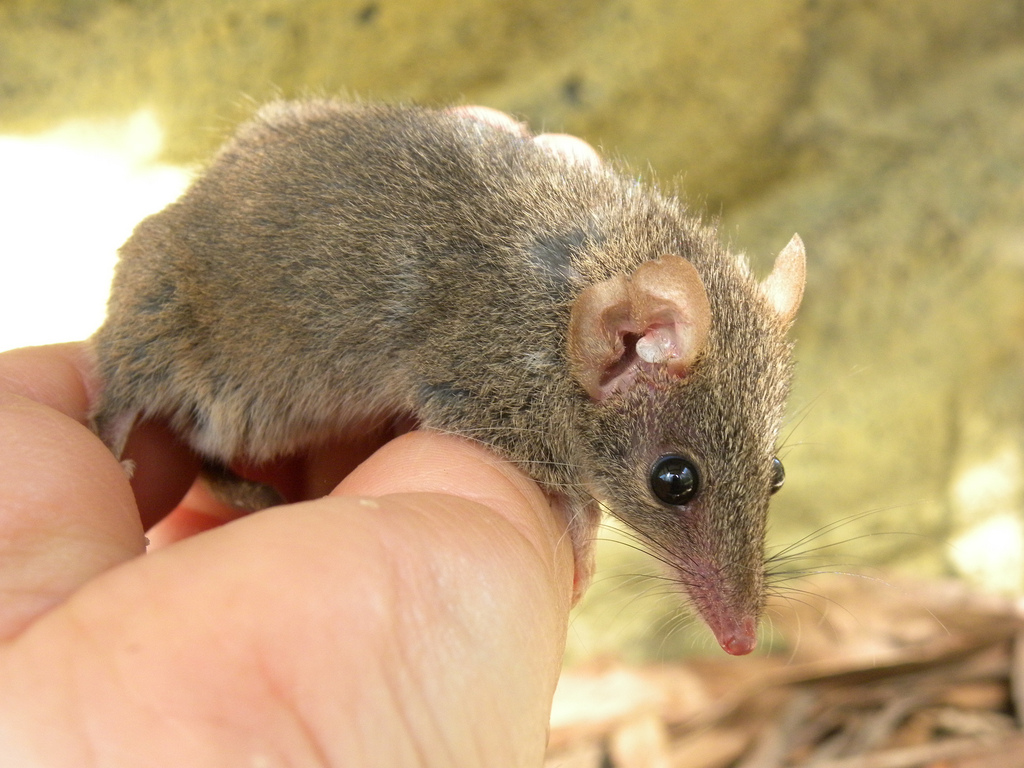
Antechinus stuartii

Studies on Antechinus stuartii reveal that male mortality is highly correlated to stress and andrenocortical activity. The study measured the corticosteroid concentration in males in the wild, males injected with cortisol, males injected with saline, and females in the wild. While both males and females exhibit high levels of corticosteroid concentration in the wild, this proves fatal only to males due to females having a higher maximum high affinity corticosteroid binding capacity (MCBC). Thus, free corticosteroid in the plasma of male A. stuartii rises sharply, while it remains constant in females. High levels of free corticosteroid, resulting from mating in wild males and injected cortisol in laboratory males, resulted in stomach ulcers, gastrointestinal bleeding, and liver abscesses, all of which increased mortality. These side-effects were not found in the males that were injected with saline, strengthening the hypothesis that high, free corticosteroids result in higher mortality in male dasyurids. A similar study on Phascogale calura showed that similar endocrine system changes happen in P. calura as A. stuartii. This supports stress-induced mortality as a characteristic of small dasyurid semelparity.

==== In Didelphidae ====
Yellow-sided opossum (Monodelphis dimidiata)

The Yellow-sided opossum is a small opossum from the grasslands of temperate South America and shows an annual semelparous reproductive strategy. Immatures are found during autumn and winter; they reach sexual maturity in spring, when mating occurs, and lactating females are found in the summer. Most adults die by mid-autumn. The marked sexual dimorphism in this species, with adult males being much larger (100–150 g versus 30–70 g in females) and possessing large, exposed canine teeth, may result from strong sexual selection in the form of male–male competition for access to females.

===== Grey slender mouse opossum (Marmosops incanus) =====
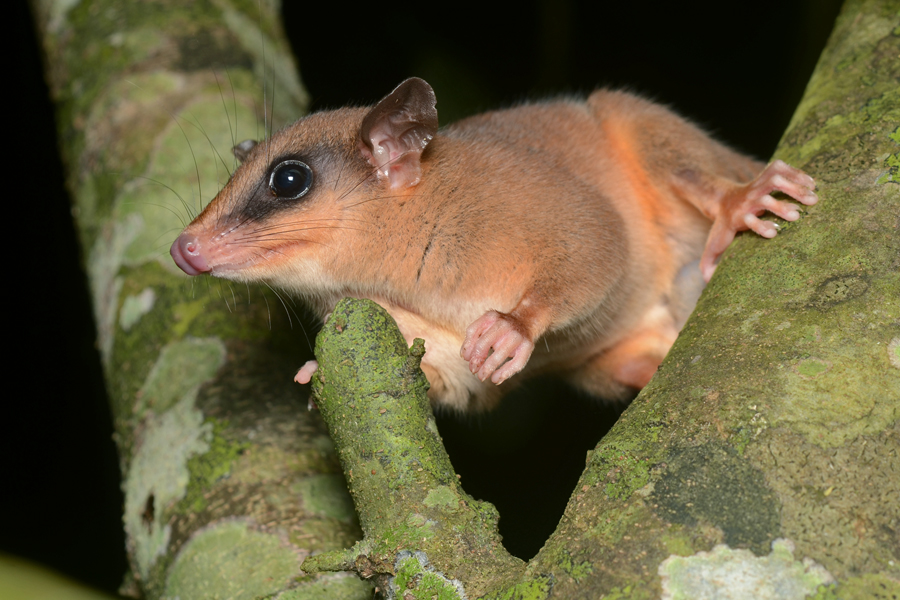
Marmosops incanus

The grey slender mouse opossum exhibits a semelparous reproductive strategy in both males and females. Males disappear from their endemic area after the reproductive season (February–May). Males found months later (June–August) are of lighter body weight and the molar teeth are less worn down, suggesting these males belong to a different generation. There is a drop off in the female population, but during the months of July and August, evidence of a gap between generations like the male gap. There is also lower body weight and less molar wear observed in females found after August. This is further supported by the evidence that females that reproduce are not observed the following year. This species has been compared to a related species, Marmosa robinsoni, in order to answer what would happen if a female that has reproduced were to survive to the next mating season. M. robinsoni has a monoestrus reproductive cycle, like M. incanus, and females are no longer fertile after 17 months so it is unlikely that females that survive past the drop off in female populations would be able to reproduce a second time.

===== Other mouse opossums =====
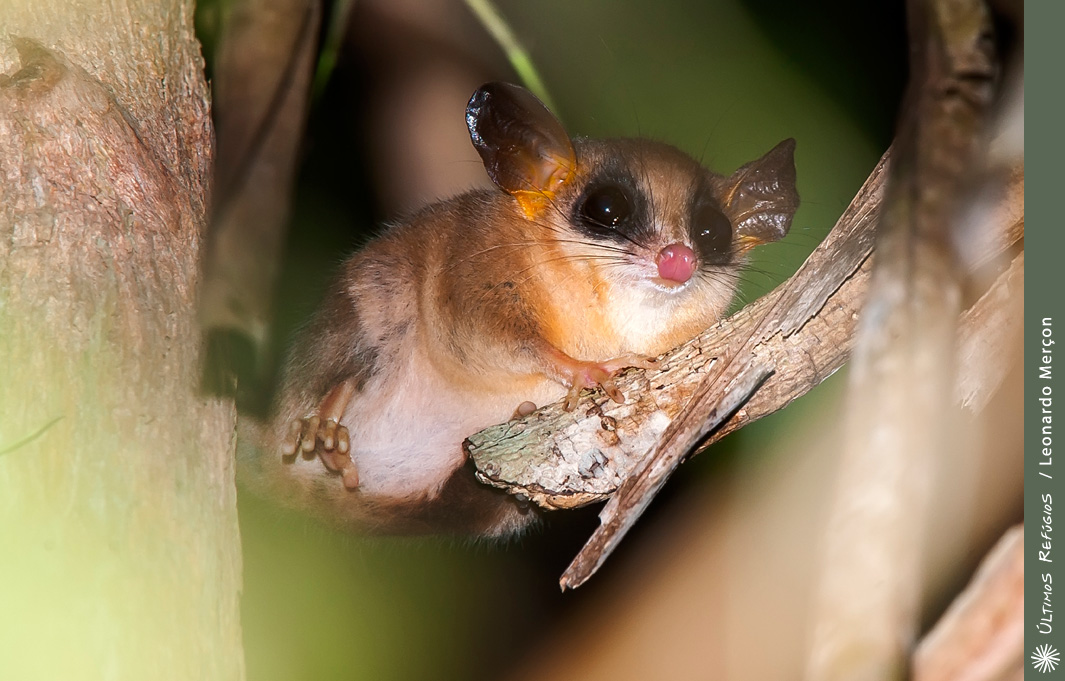
Gracilinanus microtarsus

Gracilinanus microtarsus, or the Brazilian gracile opossum, is considered to be partially semelparous because male mortality increases significantly after the mating season, but some males survive to mate again in the next reproductive cycle. The males also exhibit similar physiological degradation, demonstrated in Antechinus and other semelparous marsupials, such as fur loss and increase of infection from parasites.

=== Semelparity in fish ===
==== Pacific salmon ====
Highly elevated cortisol levels mediate the post-spawning death of semelparous Oncorhynchus Pacific salmon by causing tissue degeneration, suppressing the immune system, and impairing various homeostatic mechanisms. After swimming for such a long distance, salmon expend all of their energy on reproduction. One of the key factors in salmon rapid senescence is that these fish do not feed during reproduction so body weight is extremely reduced. In addition to physiological degradation, Pacific salmon become more lethargic as mating goes on, which makes some individuals more susceptible to predation because they have less energy to avoid predators. This also increases mortality rates of adults post-mating.

=== Semelparity in insects ===
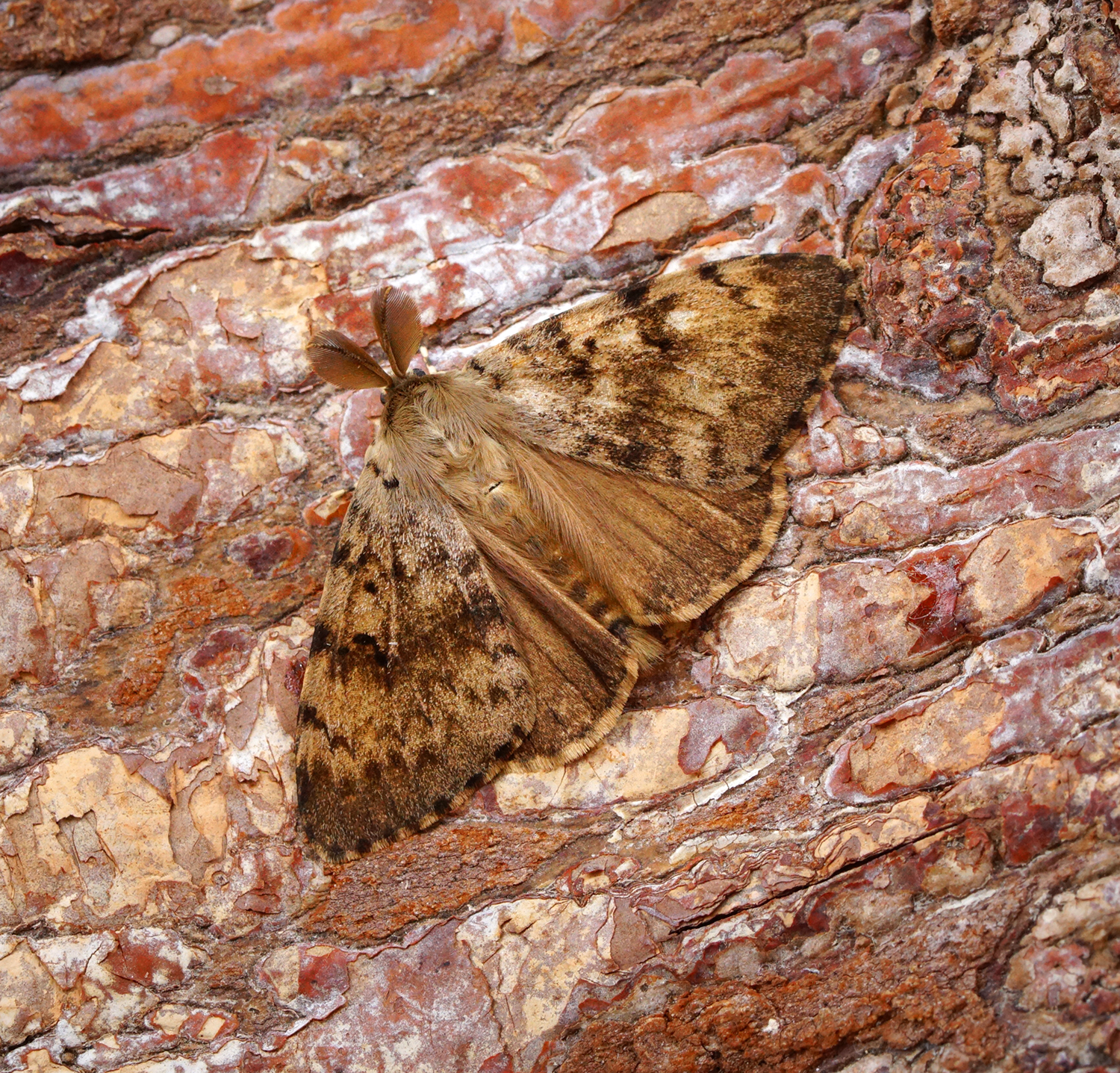
Spongy moth

Traditionally, semelparity was usually defined within the time-frame of a year. Critics of this criterion note that this scale is inappropriate in discussing patterns of insect reproduction because many insects breed more than once within one annual period, but generation times of less than one year. Under the traditional definition, insects are considered semelparous as a consequence of time scale rather than the distribution of reproductive effort over their adult life span. In order to resolve this inconsistency, Fritz, Stamp & Halverson (1982) define semelparous insects as "insects that lay a single clutch of eggs in their lifetime and deposit them at one place are clearly semelparous or 'big bang' reproducers. Their entire reproductive effort is committed at one time and they die shortly after oviposition". Semelparous insects are found in Lepidoptera, Ephemeroptera, Dermaptera, Plecoptera, Strepsiptera, Trichoptera, and Hemiptera.

==== Examples in Lepidoptera ====
Females of certain families of Lepidoptera, like the spongy moth of family Erebidae, have reduced mobility or are wingless (apterous), so they disperse in the larval stage as opposed to in the adult stage. In iteroparous insects, dispersal mainly occurs in the adult stage. All semelparous Lepidopterans share similar characteristics: larvae only feed in restricted periods of the year because of the nutritional state of their host plants (as a result, they are univoltine), initial food supply is predictably abundant, and larval host plants are abundant and adjacent. Death most commonly occurs by starvation. In the case of the spongy moth, adults do not possess an active digestive system and cannot feed, but can drink moisture. Mating occurs fairly rapidly after adults emerge from their pupal form and, without a way to digest food, the adult moths die after about a week.

== Evolutionary advantages to semelparity ==
=== Current evolutionary advantages hypothesis ===
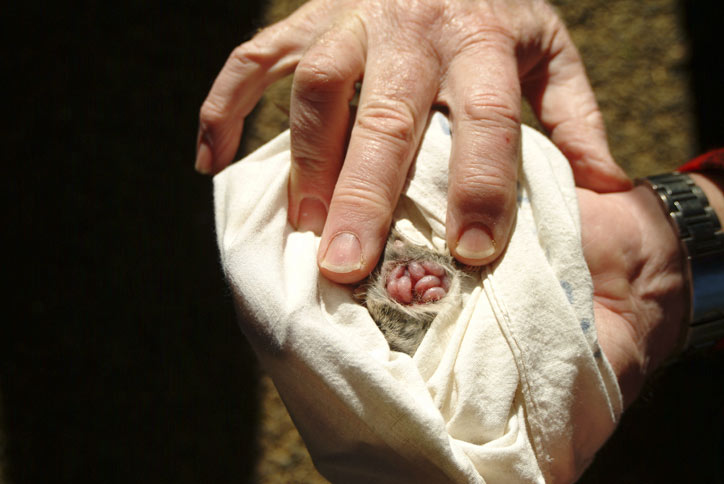
Antechinus agilis showing offspring inside pouch

The evolution for semelparity in both sexes has occurred many times in plants, invertebrates, and fish. It is rare in mammals because mammals have obligate maternal care due to internal fertilization and incubation of offspring and nursing young after birth, which requires high maternal survival rate after fertilization and offspring weaning. Also, female mammals have relatively low reproductive rates compared to invertebrates or fish because they invest a lot of energy in maternal care. However, male reproductive rate is much less constrained in mammals because only females bear young. A male that dies after one mating season can still produce a large number of offspring if he invests all of his energy in mating with many females.

==== Evolution in mammals ====
Scientists have hypothesized that natural selection has allowed semelparity to evolve in Dasyuridae and Didelphidae because of certain ecological constraints. Female mammals ancestral to these groups may have shortened their mating period to coincide with peak prey abundance. Because this window is so small, the females of these species exhibit a reproduction pattern where the estrous of all females occurs simultaneously. Selection would then favor aggressive males due to increased competition between males for access to females. Since the mating period is so short, it is more beneficial for males to expend all their energy on mating, even more so if they are unlikely to survive to the next mating season.

==== Evolution in fish ====
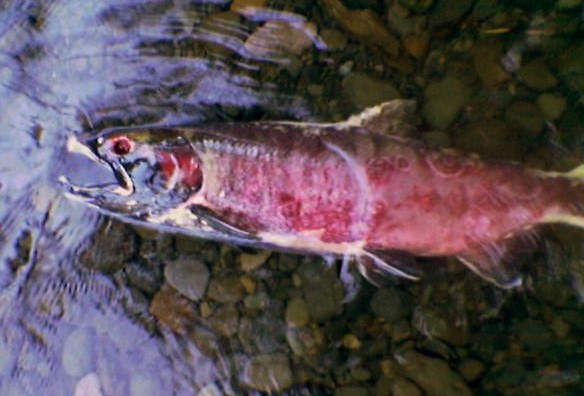
Dead salmon after spawning

Reproduction is costly for anadromous salmonids, because their life history requires transition from saltwater to freshwater streams, and long migrations, which can be physiologically taxing. The transition between cold oceanic water to warm freshwater and steep elevation changes in Northern Pacific rivers could explain the evolution of semelparity because it would be extremely difficult to return to the ocean. A noticeable difference between semelparous fish and iteroparous salmonids is that egg size varies between the two types of reproductive strategies. Studies show that egg size is also affected by migration and body size. Egg number, however, shows little variation between semelparous and iteroparous populations or between resident and anadromous populations for females of the same body size. The current hypothesis behind this reason is that iteroparous species reduce the size of their eggs in order to improve the mother's chances of survival, since she invests less energy in gamete formation. Semelparous species do not expect to live past one mating season, so females invest a lot more energy in gamete formation resulting in large eggs. Anadromous salmonids may also have evolved semelparity to boost the nutrition density of the spawning grounds. The most productive Pacific salmon spawning grounds contain the most carcasses of spawned adults. The dead bodies of the adult salmon decompose and provide nitrogen and phosphorus for algae to grow in the nutrient-poor water. Zooplankton then feed on the algae, and newly hatched salmon feed on the zooplankton.

==== Evolution in insects ====
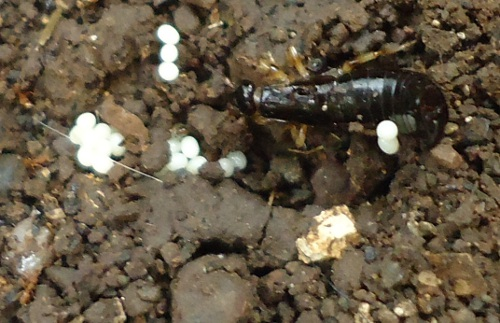
Earwig guarding eggs

An interesting trait has evolved in semelparous insects, especially in those that have evolved from parasitic ancestors, like in all subsocial and eusocial aculeate Hymenoptera. This is because larvae are morphologically specialized for development within a host's innards and thus are entirely helpless outside of that environment. Females would need to invest a lot of energy in protecting their eggs and hatched offspring. They do this through such behaviours as egg guarding. Mothers that actively defend offspring, for example, risk injury or death by doing so. This is not beneficial in an iteroparous species because the female risks dying and not reaching her full reproductive potential by not being able to reproduce in all reproductive periods in her lifetime. Since semelparous insects only live for one reproductive cycle, they can afford to expend energy on maternal care because those offspring are her only offspring. An iteroparous insect does not need to expend energy on the eggs of one mating period because it is likely that she will mate again. There is ongoing research in maternal care in semelparous insects from lineages not descended from parasites to further understand this relationship between semelparity and maternal care.

== See also ==
- Annual plant – Plant which completes its life cycle within one growing season and then dies
- Behavioral ecology – Study of the evolutionary basis for animal behavior due to ecological pressures
- Ecology – Study of organisms and their environment
- Life history theory – Analytical framework to study life history strategies used by organisms
- Perennial plant – Plant that lives for more than two years
- Plietesials – Plants that flower as a group after many years without flowering
- r/K selection theory – Evolutionary hypothesis
