= Polycarpic =

Polycarpic plants----plants that flower and set seeds many times before dying

Polycarpic plants are those that flower and set seeds many times before dying. A term of identical meaning is pleonanthic and iteroparous. Polycarpic plants are able to reproduce multiple times due to at least some portion of its meristems being able to maintain a vegetative state in some fashion so that it may reproduce again. This type of reproduction seems to be best suited for plants who have a fair amount of security in their environment as they do continuously reproduce.

Generally, in reference to life-history theory, plants will sacrifice their ability in one regard to improve themselves in another regard, so for polycarpic plants that may strive towards continued reproduction, they might focus less on their growth. However, these aspects may not necessarily be directly correlated and some plants, notably invasive species, do not follow this general trend and actually show a fairly long lifespan with frequent reproduction. To an extent, there does seem to be an importance of the balance of these two traits as one study noted how plants that had a very short lifespan as well as plants that had a very long lifespan and also had little reproductive success were not found in any of the nearly 400 plants included in the study.

Due to their reduced development, it has been noted how polycarpic plants have less energy to reproduce than monocarpic plants throughout their lifetimes. In addition, as its lifespan increases, the plant is also subject to more inconveniences due to its age, and thus might focus more towards adapting to it, resulting in less energy the plant is able to spend on reproduction. One trend that has been noticed throughout some studies is how quicker lifespans generally impact how quickly the plants increasingly expend their energy towards reproduction. However, the specific structure of polycarpic strategies depends on the specific plant and all polycarpic plants do not seem to have a uniform pattern of how energy is expended on reproduction. These strategies are not concrete and these strategies are also subject to being impacted by the random environmental factors or other functions of the plant itself.

The threat of competition might also be influential in how polycarpic plants choose to reproduce. Some studies show that while the competition itself may not be impactful, the plants can still be subject to danger through concerns such as diseases and more. Even if polycarpic plants are faced with competition, there are many ways they might respond to it such as focusing more on growth than reproduction in the hopes that they would eventually overcome the competition to successfully reproduce, or, on the other hand, the threat of elimination of the species might be too large that the plant focuses more strongly on reproduction, but this would ultimately impact their development, diminishing both their ability to grow and reproduce. This study reports that generally, when pressured, the polycarpic plant seems to focus more on reproduction, which may help them against competition as it allows them to become less overwhelmed.

Generally, herbaceous plants will choose to focus on reproduction while woody plants will generally endure it as woody plants are usually able to endure more as well as live longer than herbaceous plants, which generally have a shorter lifespan, would.

== See also ==
- Monocarpic
- Perennial
