= Mast seeding =

Fruit of forest trees like acorns and other nuts

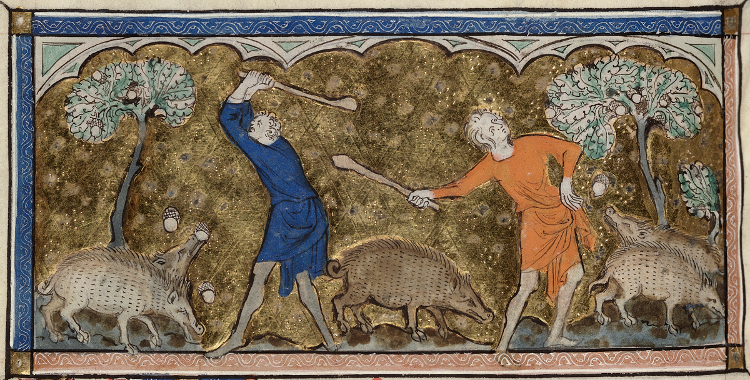
Knocking down acorns to feed pigs. 1300s England.

Mast is the fruit of forest trees and shrubs, such as acorns and other nuts. The term derives from the Old English mæst, meaning the nuts of forest trees that have accumulated on the ground, especially those used historically for fattening domestic pigs, and as food resources for wildlife. In the aseasonal tropics of Southeast Asia, entire forests, including hundreds of species of trees and shrubs, are known to mast at irregular periods of 2–12 years.

More generally, mast refers to the edible vegetative or reproductive parts produced by woody plant species, i.e., trees and shrubs, that wildlife and some domestic animals consume as a food source. Mast is generated in large quantities during long-interval but regularly recurring phenological events known as mast seeding or masting. Such events are population-level phenomena hypothesized to be driven by a wide variety of factors, depending on the plant species involved, including availability of nutrients, economies of scale, weather patterns, and as a form of predator satiation. In turn, these pulses of masting contribute to many ecosystem-level functions and dynamics.

== Types of mast ==
Mast falls into two basic types: hard mast and soft mast. Tree species such as oak, hickory, and beech produce a hard mast—acorns, hickory nuts, and beechnuts. It has been traditional to turn pigs loose into forests to fatten on this form of mast in a practice known as pannage. Other tree and shrub species produce a soft mast, such as raspberries, blueberries, and greenbriar.

== Mast seeding ==
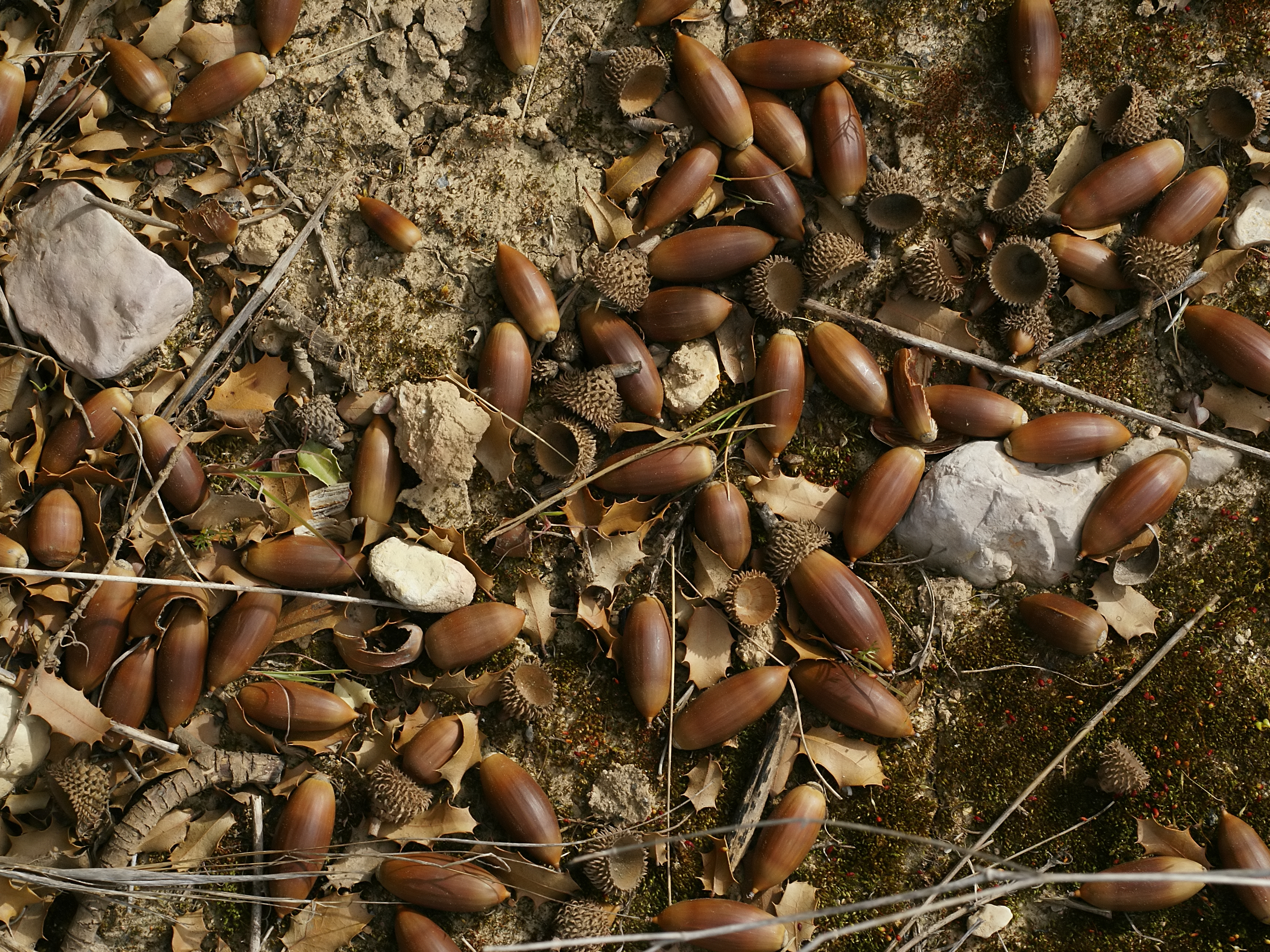
An abundance of acorns on the ground often occurs during mast seeding years

Mast seeding (or mast reproduction) is defined as the highly variable annual production of fruit by a population of trees or shrubs. These intermittent pulses of food production drive ecosystem-level functions and forest dynamics. The difference between a mast seeding year and a non-mast seeding year can be thousands of acorns, hickory nuts, beech nuts, etc. Mast seeding predominantly occurs in wind-pollinated tree species, but has also been observed in grasses and Dipterocarps.

Hypotheses for the evolution of mast seeding can broadly be assigned to three categories: economies of scale, resource matching, and proximate cues (i.e., weather).

One study proposes disease as a new hypothesis for the evolution of seed masting.

=== Economies of scale ===
The predator satiation hypothesis states that predator populations may be effectively controlled from year to year by inconsistent pulses of food made available by their prey. For predators of plant communities whose prey are the fruits and seeds produced by the plants, it has been proposed that periodic mast seeding events may be an example of this strategy. Producing excessive quantities of fruits and seeds in mast-seeding years may over-satiate seed predators to the point that only a small proportion of seeds are eaten, while a lack of seed production keeps predator populations low in the intervening years. In plant communities with a local abundance of frugivores, large seed releases can effectively exceed seed predation and improve the chance of successful establishment of seeds in future seasons.

The pollination efficiency hypothesis suggests that mast seeding may optimize successful pollination and thus fertilization if all individuals within a population are reproductively synchronized. This hypothesis is especially relevant for wind-pollinated species, which many mast-seeding species are. Both hypotheses are based on the assumption that large and variable reproductive effort is more efficient than small, consistent reproductive effort, which ultimately leads to higher fitness for the masting population.

=== Resources and weather ===
The resource matching hypothesis states that reproduction varies with the availability of resources necessary to reproduce, which is often energetically and nutritionally expensive. The main limiting resources include water, carbon in the form of nonstructural carbohydrates, and nutrients such as nitrogen and phosphorus. These resources have been shown to be depleted after mast seeding across multiple species.

Weather is a proximate driver of mast seeding, meaning that, in combination with resources and economies of scale, various weather parameters can affect the probability of mast seeding in any given season. The effects of local weather on mast seeding are highly variable depending on species and geographic location. For some species of oak, mast seeding was shown to be influenced by regional weather-related cues on phenology; such cues included spring temperature, summer drought, and spring frost. These weather variables are associated with critical times for fruit maturation and fertilization.

== Consequences ==
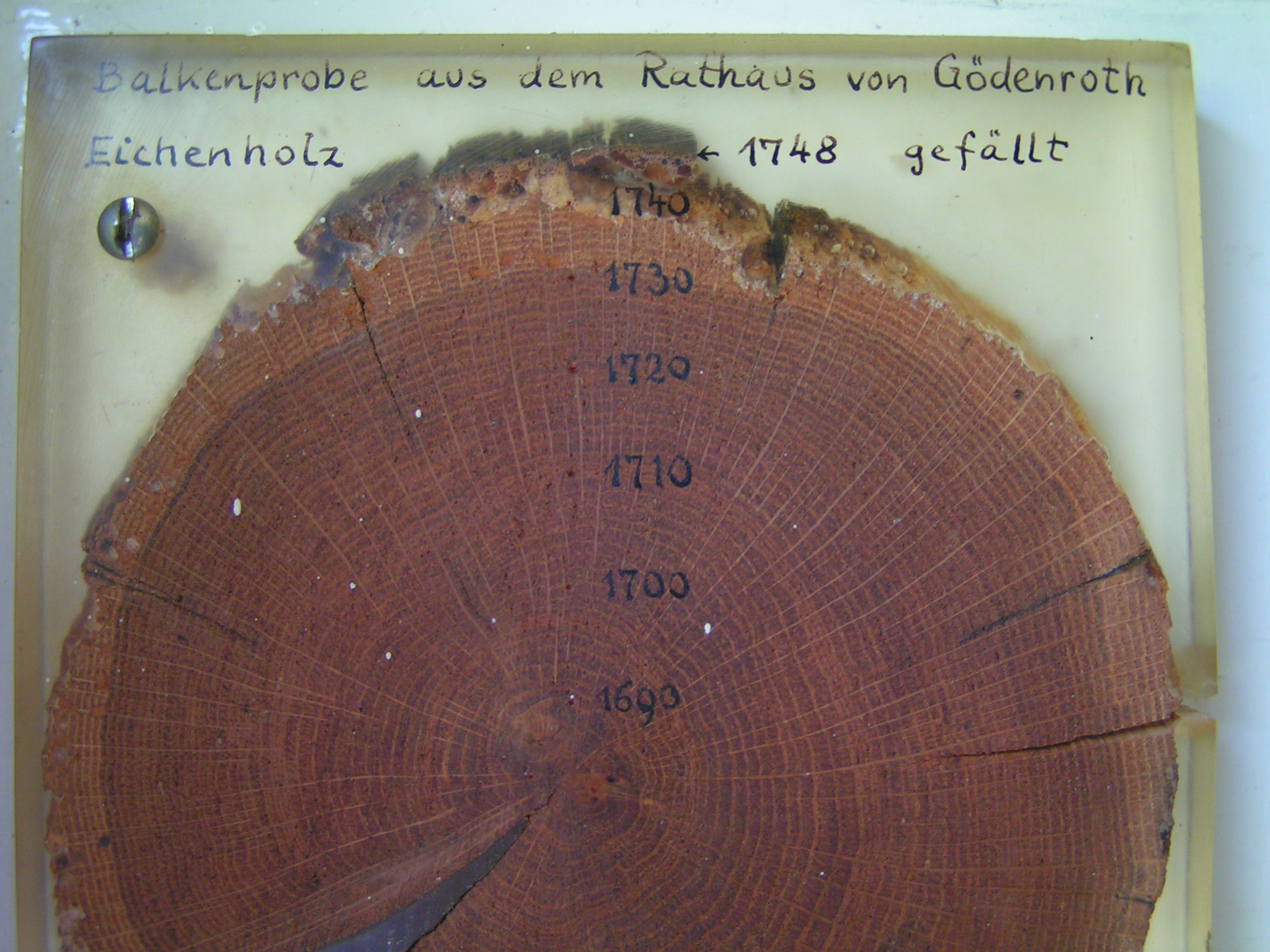
Image of wood cross section, showing tree-ring chronologies, which are affected by the interaction of mast seeding, climate, and tree growth

Mast seeding provides an abundant food source not only for wildlife but also for domestic animals and animals prone to population explosions such as mice, rats, and stoats, whose populations can increase significantly during a mast year, having been reduced by a lack of food in previous non-mast years. In turn, this makes it more likely that birds subsequently will be targeted by the pests, or that rats will invade nearby fields in what is called a "rat flood".

Mast seeding has been shown to have both positive and negative effects on ecosystems. An example of this is the white-footed mouse. When a mast seeding event occurs, the population of white-footed mice also increases, which has been shown in turn to increase instances of Lyme disease, since these mice are hosts for ticks, the disease's primary vector. A positive effect of increased white-footed mouse population is that they prey on gypsy moths, which are a major forest pest in the eastern United States.

The interaction between disturbance by fire and mast seeding is key to white spruce regeneration and subsequent stand dynamics in the boreal mixed-wood forest. Peters et al. (2005) found significantly higher densities of white spruce in stands originating from fires that coincided with mast years than from fires coinciding with years of low cone crops. While noting that previous studies had assessed a three- to five-year window of opportunity for obtaining white spruce regeneration after fire before seedbed deterioration closed it, Peters et al. (2005) adduced three lines of evidence to support their claim that the importance of the fire × mast-year interaction hinges on the rapid deterioration of the seedbed, even within one year after fire. Rapid seedbed deterioration is likely to augment the mast-year effect for white spruce as compared with species that are less dependent on short-lived, disturbance-created regeneration microsites. Seed limitation, as well as seedbed deterioration, influences age structure in white spruce. Mast-year effects on the density of white spruce are long-lasting; 40 years after fire, mast-year fires still had 2.5 times more spruce regeneration than non-mast-year fires.

The interaction of mast seeding, climate, and tree growth creates notable effects in tree ring chronologies, and in many tree species reduced growth has been observed in mast years.

=== Mast seeding under climate change ===
Many mast seeding species are considered foundation species. Predicting how the intensity and frequency of mast seeding may be altered by climate change will help researchers to determine shifts in the availability of food resources to wildlife and forest dynamics. Mast seeding has become more variable globally during the last century, although the drivers of these long-term changes in mast seeding have not been fully identified. For example, in Europe, mast seeding intensity appears to be linked to the mode of the North Atlantic Oscillation, and in tropical south Asia, mast events appear to be linked to the El Niño–Southern Oscillation.

== See also ==
- Phenology
- Seed tree
